= Violator (album) =

1990 studio album by Depeche Mode

Studio album by Depeche Mode
- Released: 19 March 1990
- Recorded: May–September 1989
- Studios: Logic (Milan); Puk (Gjerlev, Denmark); The Church (London)
- Genres: Synth-pop; electropop; alternative rock; dance; gothic rock
- Length: 47:02
- Label: Mute
- Producers: Depeche Mode; Flood

Depeche Mode chronology
101 (1989)	Violator (1990)	Songs of Faith and Devotion (1993)

Singles from Violator
- 1. "Personal Jesus" Released: 29 August 1989; 2. "Enjoy the Silence" Released: 5 February 1990; 3. "Policy of Truth" Released: 7 May 1990; 4. "World in My Eyes" Released: 17 September 1990

Violator is the seventh studio album by the English electronic band Depeche Mode, released on 19 March 1990 by Mute Records internationally and by Sire and Reprise Records in the United States. It was produced by the band and Mark Ellis, professionally known as Flood. Tracks for the album were recorded in Milan, Gjerlev, and London, where the album was mixed by François Kevorkian.

Accompanied by the singles "Personal Jesus", "Enjoy the Silence", "Policy of Truth" and "World in My Eyes", the album propelled the band into international stardom. Violator reached number two on the UK Albums Chart and became the band's first album to chart inside the top 10 of the Billboard 200, peaking at number seven. The album was supported by the World Violation Tour.

As of 2006, the album was estimated to have sold over 7.5 million copies worldwide, making it Depeche Mode's best-selling album. Many previous producers, engineers and staff who have worked with Depeche Mode over the years have named Violator as their favorite Depeche Mode record. It has been included on several lists of the greatest albums of the 1990s, and of all time.

== Background ==
Depeche Mode supported their previous album, Music for the Masses (1987), with the Music for the Masses Tour, which ran from late 1987 through mid-1988, and was documented on the live album 101, released in March 1989. Both Music for the Masses and 101 were successful and regarded as instrumental in propelling Depeche Mode into mainstream success in the United States, which up until that point had eluded them.

Music for the Masses had marked a turning point in both the band's sound and visual identity, with band member Alan Wilder's production influencing the music and Anton Corbijn's involvement in most of the accompanying music videos and promotional materials.

During a break after the Music for the Masses Tour had completed, band members Wilder and Martin Gore pursued their own solo projects, with Wilder releasing his Recoil project's album Hydrology (1988), and Gore releasing his debut solo recording, Counterfeit EP (1989).

== Recording ==
=== Selecting a co-producer ===
In early 1989, Mute label owner and former co-producer with the band Daniel Miller suggested that the band reach out to Mark Ellis, known as "Flood", to help with their new material's production. Flood had some history with Depeche Mode, having remixed the B-side to their single "Shake the Disease" (1986) and producing Vince Clarke's Erasure band's two recent albums, Wonderland (1986) and The Circus (1987). Said Miller, "Flood is technically very good, very musical, and very open. He's not one of these: 'This is the way it has to be'. It’s more like: 'How can we do it differently?' He was in sync with the band's mentality – and my own." Gore and singer Dave Gahan both agreed that they wanted to work with a producer who would push them to produce their best music. Said Gahan, "We had reached a point [after Music for the Masses] where we couldn't go any further in that direction [of making music]. We knew we had to change our way of working. We had to go away and rethink everything." Said Wilder, "This scruffy, bespectacled, rather unlikely looking bloke rolled up, raided the fridge a couple of times, slouched down on the sofa, pontificated for a bit and thus – a new production team was born."

=== Pre-production and demos ===
After agreeing to work with Flood, Wilder met with him in London for some brief pre-production work. Said Wilder, "Usually we begin the making of a record by having extensive pre-production meetings where we decide what the record will actually sound like, then go into a programming studio. This time we decided to keep all pre-production to a minimum." After three weeks in London, the entire band flew to Milan, Italy, for a seven-week session at Logic Studios.

The band had asked Martin Gore, their main songwriter, to bring in simpler, less complete demos to give the band an opportunity to more fully collaborate and work in the studio. Said band member Andy Fletcher, "Over the years Martin's studio at home got progressively better and better so the demos he was producing and giving to us were very good quality. ... We were basically re-recording Martin's demos with better sounds, better production and Dave's [Gahan's] vocals." Gore agreed, saying "Over the last five years I think we'd perfected a formula; my demos, a month in a programming studio, etc. etc. We decided that our first record of the '90s ought to be different."

=== Logic Studios ===
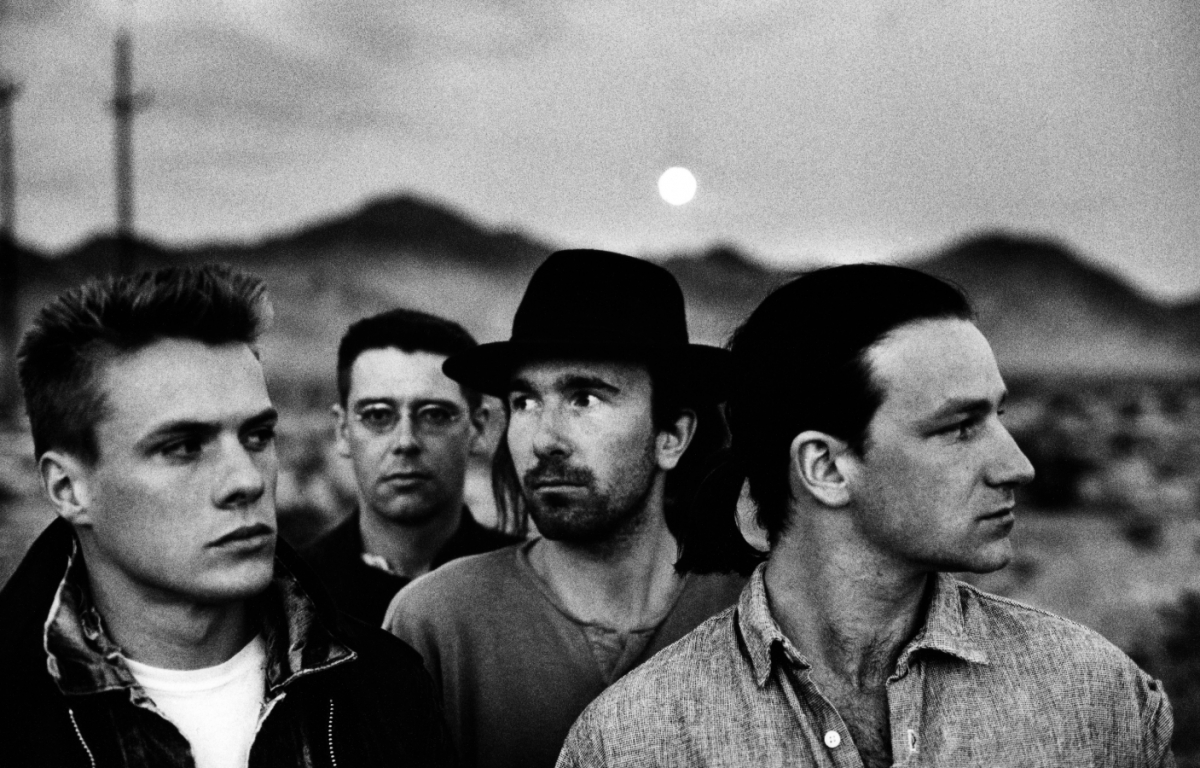
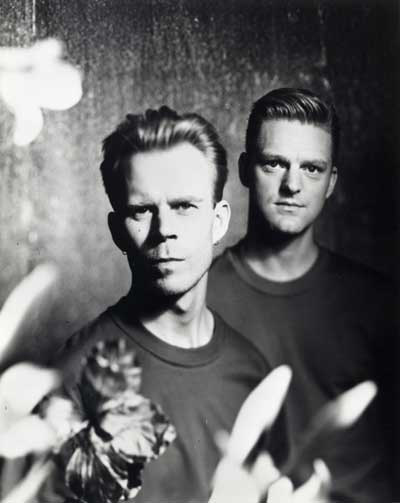
Producer Flood had recently worked with both U2 (left, pictured in 1986) and Erasure (right, pictured in 1989), and felt that Depeche Mode were an appropriate band to try and merge rock and synthpop styles with their new material.

The time at Logic Studios was, according to Flood, when "everybody was feeling each other out, because they wanted to try working in a different way. The idea was to work hard and party hard and we all enjoyed ourselves to the full." Flood and Wilder worked well together, with Wilder appreciating Flood's ability to work with a sampler or a synthesiser to help with small details, and see the big picture when it came to their music." Depeche Mode were looking for a harder sound, and Flood had worked with both U2 and Erasure previously, saying "I'd been working with synth and rock bands. I'd felt that there was a way that the two forms of music could actually work together. In a way, Depeche [Mode] were the perfect band to work with that idea and methodology." With co-producer Flood, Wilder began a complementary working relationship, with Flood able to provide the technical know-how and Wilder working on the arrangements and song textures. "That's how we made the group work at that time", said Wilder, "by accepting that we all had different roles and not actually all trying to do the same thing. So we ended up with this unwritten agreement in the band, where we'd all throw together a few ideas at the beginning of a track. Then [Fletcher and Gore] would go away, and they'd come back after we'd worked on it for a while to give an opinion." Fletcher appreciated that Flood pushed the band to discard the rules that they'd been carrying for a few albums, saying Flood "said all our preconceived ideas were basically a lot of shit, and if you wanna use a guitar, you use a guitar." Gahan said that the band used more guitar on songs from this album than they had on any previous album, saying "musically, we'll take things the hard way round. ... If there's a certain part that lends itself to a guitar, we won't necessarily use a guitar for the sake of it. We'll try to find something else and we'll possibly come back to the guitar anyway. Picking up the guitar and playing it is the easy way out for us a lot of the time."

Although the band didn't get much recording done in Milan, the process did help the band and Flood coalesce around their new sound and working style. One track produced out of these sessions was from one of Gore's demos called "Personal Jesus". True to his word, Gore kept his demo very simple, just a beat and a melody played on his acoustic guitar. In the studio, Wilder and Flood sent the rest of the band away most of the time while they worked on the song. Said Wilder, "In the earlier years, everybody would be there [in the studio] with the result often being lots of chat and mucking around with little actual work being achieved. As time went on, we all realised that less people in the control room equaled more work done." Miller later suggested that this was the beginning of cracks in the band, with Wilder often irritated at other members of the band, who would wander into the control room with unwanted feedback before wandering off again. For the song, the band continued their tradition of building new samples for their music, recording people jumping on road cases for the 'stomping' sound used in the song.

Wilder noticed that Gahan was showing some increasingly unstable behavior during their time in Milan as Gahan's dabbling with drugs became more pronounced. Said Wilder, "I think Dave [Gahan] was increasingly living in his own world. The most unsettling thing was that his drug use adversely affected his personality, either through enhanced aggression or the loss of his greatest asset: his sense of humour. I think I [first] noticed it during the recording of Violator in Milan ... I remember, for no reason, he deliberately picked a fight with about ten locals just walking down the street. I was petrified, expecting to be knifed at any point, but somehow he always got away with that sort of behavior." Gahan would later say "It's no secret I've been drinking and using drugs for a long time – probably since I was about 12; popping a couple of my mum's phenobarbitones every now and then; hash; amphetamines; coke came along. Alcohol was always there, hand in hand with drugs." Gahan's drug use worsened in 1990, and by the end of 1990 he was regularly using heroin.

The band chose to release "Personal Jesus" as a single, with Flood saying it was partially chosen because "it stood out head and shoulders as a perfect track to say 'Here's Depeche Mode, but not as you know them.'" "Personal Jesus" was released on 29 August, 1989. The band loved the song, but was worried that it might struggle for airplay, given its lyrical content. Two of Depeche Mode's previous singles, "Master and Servant" and "Blasphemous Rumours", had caused controversies when some radio stations and refused to play them. Their fears were unfounded, however, and "Personal Jesus" went on to become Mute's best selling 12" single of all time up to that point, surpassing releases by artists such as Prince and Madonna. The single's success garnered the band an invitation to play the song on BBC's Top of the Pops. On the strength of the single's performance, its B-side, "Dangerous", charted at number 13 on the US Modern Rock Tracks Chart itself. After their seven weeks in Milan, Depeche Mode moved to Puk Recording Studios in Denmark, where they had mixed their album Music for the Masses, to record the rest of their new material.

=== Puk Studios ===
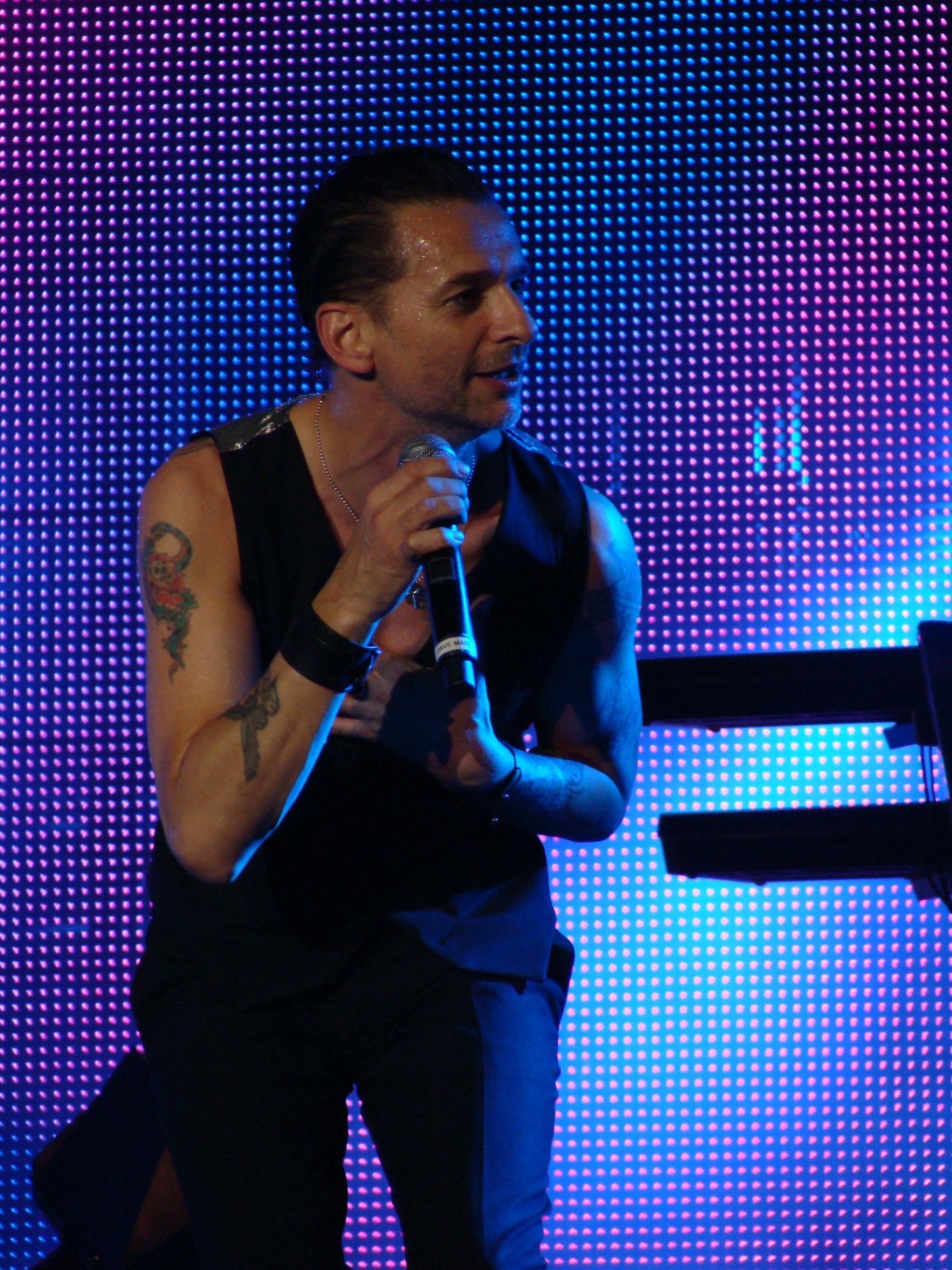
Dave Gahan (pictured in 2009) is the lead singer for Depeche Mode, and sung on most of the tracks from Violator.

Sessions at Puk started in the middle of 1989, and by the end of August of that year, most of the rest of the album's tracks had been recorded there in sessions that Wilder later called "prolific". However, Fletcher was diagnosed with a form of depression stemming from the death of his sister a few years earlier, and as a result was absent for treatment for most of the sessions in Denmark.

The first track the band worked on at Puk was "World in My Eyes", although it was started during the Milan sessions at Logic Studios. Flood remembered that he wasn't happy with the track as it was initially made, and had mentioned that to Wilder and Gahan. The next morning, Gore and Fletcher came in to the studio and said the same thing; at that point they realised they had to start over, so Wilder and Flood spent half a day "just jamming out ideas". The track's bass line and melody came out of those sessions, and by the time the rest of the band returned, the track had completely changed. Flood said that after he and Wilder played the band the new version, the rest of the band looked a bit shocked. Gore later said that Wilder had been a great influence on the band, but "Flood in tandem with Wilder was a great team." Gore called the track "World in My Eyes" a very positive song: "It's saying that love and sex and pleasure are positive things." Worked on at both Logic and Puk, the track was ultimately finished in London during the sessions at The Church Studios.

The second track the band recorded at Puk was "Policy of Truth". They started with Gore's demo and started to riff, with Flood explaining that "we got the guitar riff together and the way the drums were programmed," and that this track, alongside "World in My Eyes", marked a shift in the band's attitude about how they'd approach their songs.

The song "Blue Dress", which Gore called "pervy", is simply about "watching a girl dress and realising that this is 'what makes the world turn.'"

With "Halo", Gore said, "I'm saying 'let's give in to this' but there's also a real feeling of wrongfulness [...] I suppose my songs do seem to advocate immorality but if you listen there's always a sense of guilt." Wilder later called "Halo" his favorite on the album, saying "I like the string arrangement and the fact that we used drum loops on it – something we had hardly done before that time." "Halo" was "on a shortlist" of songs from the album considered to be released as singles, and a video for it was shot and included on the video compilation Strange Too (1990), but it was never officially released as a single itself.

"Waiting for the Night" was, at that point, one of the few Depeche Mode songs that featured both Gore and Gahan on vocals. Gore was originally slated to sing the track, but Gahan asked to sing it as well, saying "I really like the song, can I sing on it?" Flood and Wilder provided what one review later called a "stunning and simple arrangement". Wilder said, “Flood and I had been listening to Tangerine Dream and decided to try and create a similar atmosphere for this track. The main sequence was put together using his ARP 2600 and the sequencer that accompanies the synth. The charm of the ARP sequencer stems from the slight tuning and timing variations that occur each time the part is played. This gives a sense of fluidity and continual change, which seems to suit the song."

Gahan suggested that he might have sung the song "Sweetest Perfection", but vocals for the song were performed by Gore. In a Q&A with the band's fan magazine, Gahan said that when it came to deciding who should sing on any given song, "Martin [Gore], Alan [Wilder] and myself discuss it." According to Classic Pop magazine, the song "builds to an almost psychedelic conclusion", which Wilder explained as "the kind of thing you resort to when you haven’t really got an ending."

"Enjoy the Silence" was initially written as a ballad by Gore, performed on a Harmonium with just Gore's voice. When he first heard the demo, Wilder said when he heard the lyric "All I ever wanted", he heard it in his head in Neil Tennant's (of the Pet Shop Boys) voice. Said Wilder, "it occurred to me that it [Enjoy the Silence] could work brilliantly as a sort of up-temp dance track. ... I think the others were a little dubious, but after a little bit of persuasion they said, 'Well, why don't you and Flood put together something that you think will be appropriate for this track, and we'll go away and come back when you're ready to play it to us.'" Gore was especially resistant to the proposed change, saying "The song was called 'Enjoy the Silence' and you know that seemed to be in total contrast with [it being turned into] a disco track". Flood and Wilder spent time putting together the song, and later invited Gore back into the studio to record the guitar riff, after which point, the band realised that they had a hit on their hands. Fletcher later called the moment they put the song together in its final form "one of the most magical moments I've ever had with Depeche Mode."

The closing track, "Clean", was inspired by Pink Floyd's song "One of These Days", from their 1971 album Meddle. Said Wilder, "they [Pink Floyd] were doing something very different to anyone else at that time – you can hear electronics in there, and the influence of classical music. It's got a very repetitive, synthesised sound, and the bass riffs with the echo have a very hypnotic groove that underpins it. We basically nicked that idea [for 'Clean']", although he clarified that the original wasn't sampled, rather, "it [Clean] was programmed using a combination of analogue synth and [in-house] sampled bass guitar."

To maintain a less machine-like feel to the songs, most of the album's percussion was sampled and played back through loops via samplers. Wilder felt that by sampling live percussion and looping it, it kept the imperfect "human" element, which helped avoid the cold, electronic feel of a drum machine. Gahan provided some guitar on the segue/hidden track "Interlude #2 (Crucified)" between "Enjoy the Silence" and "Policy of Truth", a first for the singer on a Depeche Mode album.

Overall, Gore summarised the songs on the album as about "relationships, power, desire, love, good and bad, incest, sin, religion, and immorality."

=== The Church Studios ===
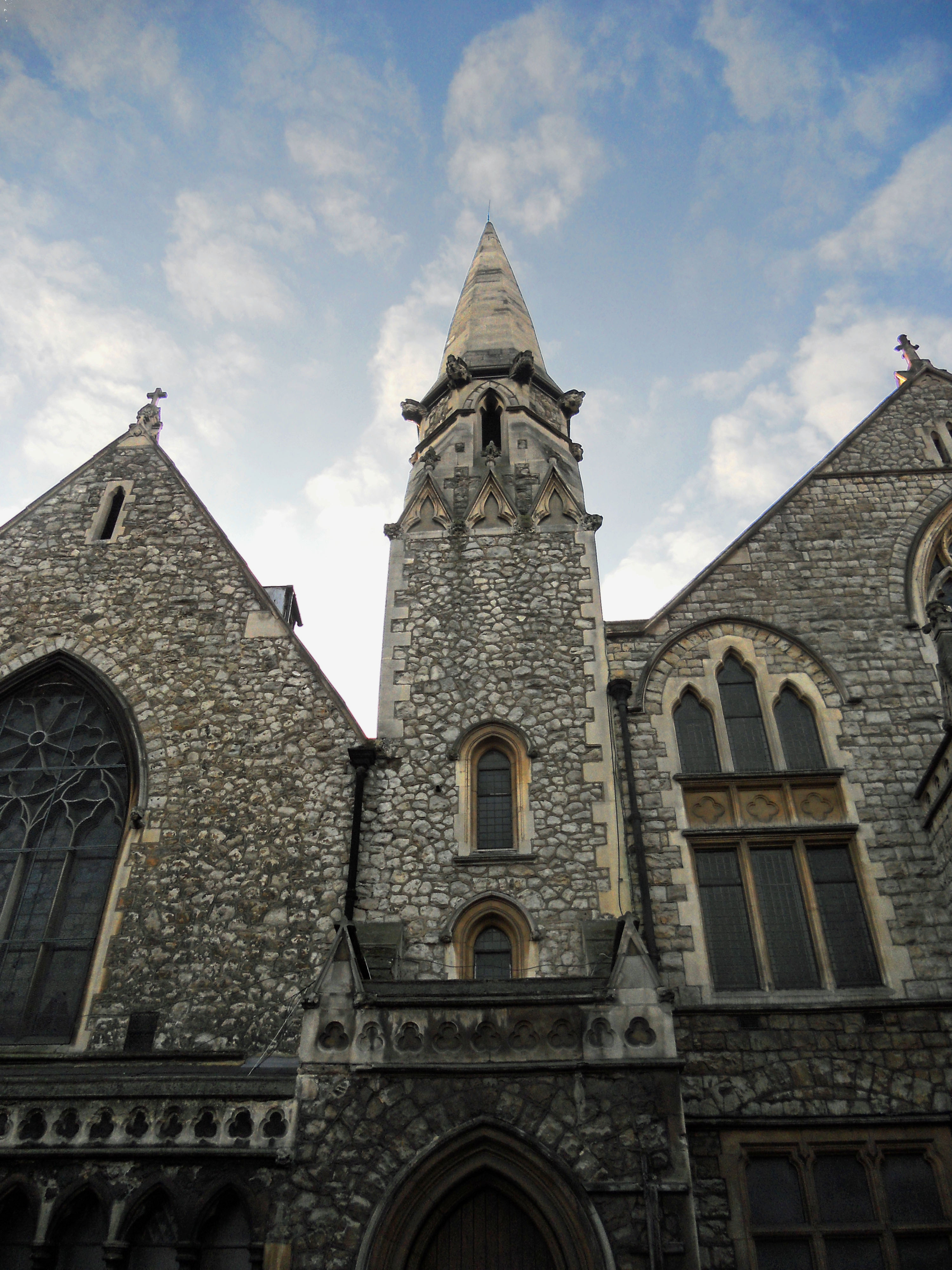
The Church Studios, pictured in 2012, where final mixing of Violator took place.

By September 1989, the band returned to England to finish and mix the album at The Church Studios, at the time owned by Dave Stewart of Eurythmics, with eight of the album's nine tracks already recorded. They reported to their fan magazine their intention to stay at The Church Studios until at least Christmas that year, where they were going to record a few of the album's B-sides and remixes. A total of six B-sides were recorded for Violator: "Dangerous", "Memphisto", "Sibeling", "Kaleid", "Happiest Girl", and "Sea of Sin". According to Wilder, "Happiest Girl" was originally slated for inclusion on the album, but ultimately was only released as a B-side.

By the time all tracks were recorded, Flood was no longer available, so Miller brought in François Kevorkian to do the album's final mix. Miller was a fan of Kevorkian's, appreciating his work on Kraftwerk's album Electric Café (1986) as well as his remixes of Yazoo's "Situation" (1982). Miller later called Kevorkian "obsessive" and "one of the most intense people" that he knew, saying that Kevorkian "would work for 18 hours a day and I think he got through at least three different engineers, because they couldn't take it," although Miller also called him "brilliant". Some of the band, however, were less enthusiastic about Kevorkian's work, with Gore complaining that he didn't share what he was doing until he was done. "Enjoy the Silence" was originally mixed by Kevorkian, but the final mix was done by Miller. Nevertheless, Wilder preferred the original mix, complaining that "our most successful single ever was one of the flattest, dullest-sounding mixes, with a snare drum that sounds like a sticky toffee pudding!".

Overall, the band were upbeat during the recording sessions for Violator. Gore said the album "shines a light on the mood of the band at the time and, in particular, the excitement that was being generated with what was then a new producer in Flood and how they were approaching the entire process." Gahan later said, "We were aware that we were making a record that was exciting. It was certainly exciting to make. I have very fond memories of making Violator on every level. ... the experimentation, the excitement in the studio, the songs. But I don't think we were really aware of what was going on in terms of people waiting for this record."

Flood later said "I will always remember the playback session for the album. It was the first time I'd heard it all put together. I just turned around and looked at Miller. Both of us went, 'this is a really really really good album.'" In 2006, Gore called Violator his favorite Depeche Mode album ever.

== Title and artwork ==
Regarding the album's title, Gore said, "We called it Violator as a joke. We wanted to come up with the most extreme, ridiculously heavy metal title that we could. I'll be surprised if people will get the joke."

Anton Corbijn designed the album's cover art, a red rose on a black background.

== Release and promotion ==
From late 1989 through early 1990, the band performed new tracks "Personal Jesus" and "Enjoy the Silence" on a variety of European TV shows, including Peter's Pop Show and the Dutch music show Countdown.

On 18 March 1990, the day before the album was due to be released, the band agreed to participate in a promotional record-signing event at a record store in downtown Los Angeles. The event was expected to draw a few thousand fans, but instead drew over 15,000. The unexpectedly large crowd caused traffic issues in the area, and what was supposed to be a four-hour signing lasted only a few minutes as the band were taken away due to potentially unsafe conditions around the record store. Private security hired for the event could not handle the crowd, and riot police had to be called. Wilder later said, "It wasn't really a riot, let's get it straight. ... there wasn't any violence involved." Gahan joked that it was a standard crowd for a Chelsea F.C. football match, saying "how lucky we were for getting so much publicity for doing nothing." The band later found out that the LA police chief told the local media that the mobilization as a result of the crowd was the biggest police operation since the last time the city was visited by a US President. As a result of the incident, Depeche Mode were on local news stations that night across the US, the night before their new album was released. Gore later said, "Until that point, I think we felt like we'd been banging our heads against the wall [in terms of record sales in America]. All of our records had sold well, but they had all sold the same amount. ... And then suddenly, something tipped us over the edge," and noted that the record signing news had done the band a huge service by making the public aware of the album's release. As a result of the cancelled record signing, the band agreed to send up to 25,000 copies of "rare interviews and previously unreleased material" to anyone who sent a self-addressed stamped envelope to the local KROQ-FM radio station from the LA area.

Violator was released on 19 March 1990 by Mute Records in the UK and Sire Records and Reprise Records in the US. In the UK, the album was assigned catalogue number STUMM64.

The album charted well, hitting number one in France and Spain, number 2 in the UK, Germany and Switzerland, and landing in the top seven in four other countries, including the US, where it spent a year and a half on the album charts. As a result, it went triple-platinum in the US. Before the end of 1990, the album had sold 4,000,000 copies, and by 2006, it was estimated to have sold over 7,000,000 copies globally.

The single "Personal Jesus" went on to sell a million copies, and "Enjoy the Silence" became Depeche Mode's best selling single ever, as well as being awarded the "Best Single" at the 1990 Brit Awards. On 22 October 1990, Depeche Mode released their video collection Strange Too, which contained the videos from their four Violator singles, as well as promotional videos for non-single tracks "Clean" and "Halo".

In 2006, the album was re-released in a Collector's Edition, which included a 5.1 sound that was mixed and engineered by Kevin Paul for Audio Authority at Instrument Studios in London, with Wilder, Flood, and Miller as executive producers.

=== Tour ===
To support the album, the band embarked on the World Violation Tour, which ran from May to November 1990 over 88 shows. Due to the popularity the band had cultivated over the past few years, and the success of Violator and its singles, the band played mostly stadiums for the first time. The band felt they had successfully crossed over from a synth band to a rock band who happened to use synthesisers. Said Wilder of the scale of the tour, "We've been building to this over the last ten years." The stage for the tour was designed by frequent collaborator Anton Corbijn.

=== Subsequent events ===
During the tour, Gahan's father died, and after the tour, he split from his wife Joanne Fox Gahan and young son and moved to Los Angeles to live with his new girlfriend, Teresa Conroy. This began the slide into heroin addiction for Gahan, which almost led to the break-up of the band a few years later. After Gahan's recovery in the late 1990s, he said of his time on the World Violation Tour, "I had everything that I could possibly want but I was really lost. I didn't feel like I even knew myself anymore. And I felt like shit because I constantly cheated on my wife and I went back home and lied."

At the end of the tour, the band agreed to take a year-long break. However, in mid-1991, they were lured back into the studio to record a new track, titled "Death's Door", for Wim Wenders' upcoming new film, Until the End of the World (1991). Said Gore, "We did that [song] over three or four days, and now we're back resting possibly going back into the studio sometime next year." Of recording the song, Wilder said "Martin [Gore] obviously wrote the song, but the backing track to 'Death's Door' was mostly my work. The guitar parts were sampled, but not from the demo. I reworked Martin's previously recorded guitar from 'Blue Dress' and also used some pedal steel out-takes play by Nils Tuxen, which were recorded direct to DAT when we hired him to perform on 'Clean'. Dave [Gahan] didn't want to come to England to do this track, so I worked on it myself at my home studio and called Martin in to do the vocals later on. It was mixed with Steve Lyon at Konk [studio]."

In February 1992, the band reconvened in Madrid to start work on their follow-up album, Songs of Faith and Devotion (1993).

== Critical reception ==
Retrospective professional ratings
Review scores
Source	Rating
AllMusic	5/5 stars
Blender	5/5 stars
Christgau's Consumer Guide	C−
The Guardian	5/5 stars
Mojo	5/5 stars
Pitchfork	7.9/10
Q	5/5 stars
Rolling Stone	4.5/5 stars
Spin	4/5 stars
Uncut	4/5 stars

Matt Mitchell of Paste Magazine opined that "the songs are so indebted to pop architecture that you can sometimes forget how sad and spellbinding they are down to the core," calling tracks on the album "bigger, bolder and more anthemic" than any of Depeche Mode's previous material. The styles have been categorised as synth-pop, electropop, alternative rock, dance, and gothic rock.

In a contemporary review for Melody Maker, music critic Paul Lester called Violator "Depeche Mode's most arresting work to date." Tim Nicholson of Record Mirror was enthused by the stripped-down quality of the songs and called the album a "compromise between pop music and something a little more sinister", adding: "There are no noises out of place in this perfectly formed void." Ian Cranna of Q found the music subtly clever and deemed Violator "a fine record which may not set the world on fire but deserves to singe it a bit." NME writer Helen Mead felt that the album "seems almost a step back, in that it's cleaner, sparser, more clinical" than Music for the Masses, but concluded that "there is security in the knowledge that everything is very clear cut in Depeche Mode's blue and white world."

In a less enthusiastic review, Robert Christgau said that Depeche Mode conceded to fickle teenage demographics on Violator. Rolling Stone magazine's Chuck Eddy said that, despite the album's "ambient charm", Gahan sounds "slimy and self-involved", and in their attempt to make listeners dance, Depeche Mode "revert to morose pop psychology and then never tell you how come they're so sad." For Entertainment Weekly, Greg Sandow wrote that the songs "hint at unspecified meanings, in a mannered way that might well be called pompous".

Among retrospective appraisals, AllMusic critic Ned Raggett viewed Violator as "song for song ... simply the best, most consistent effort yet from the band", while Blender's Dennis Lim deemed it Depeche Mode's "career peak" and "justifiably their biggest critical and commercial success". Barry Walters of Rolling Stone identified the album as one of the "key stages in the band's evolution", citing its emphasis on "heavier hooks, cinematic arrangements and sleek sonic detail." In Mojo, Danny Eccleston wrote that Violator found Depeche Mode merging "European and US paradigms much as U2 had done in the mid-'80s", transforming them "from an arena-level electro-pop unit into a global stadium rock band". Writing for Q, John Aizlewood singled out Flood's production on the album for praise, saying that the resulting "warmth" of the music "has helped Violator to age with consummate grace." Sal Cinquemani of Slant Magazine called the album "a quintessential benchmark of pop, rock, and electronic music".

In 2017, Billboard magazine included four songs from Violator on their list of Top 20 Depeche Mode songs, with "Waiting for the Night", "Policy of Truth", "Personal Jesus" and "Enjoy the Silence" coming in at numbers nineteen, four, two and one, respectively.

=== Rankings ===
Violator was ranked number 57 on Rolling Stone's 2010 list of the 100 best albums of the 1990s. It was ranked number 342 on the 2003 and 2012 editions of the magazine's list of the 500 greatest albums of all time, and number 167 on the list's 2020 edition. Violator has also featured on lists of the greatest albums of all time made by publications such as Q and Spin, and is included in the book 1001 Albums You Must Hear Before You Die. It was also included on Pitchfork's, NME's and Slant Magazine's Top 100 Albums of the 1990s, Slant Magazine also included it on their 2003 list of 50 Essential Pop Albums. In 2015, VICE News wrote: "Part pop saveur, part lecherous perv, Violator at 25 [years old] is still creepy-sexy enough to arrest a new generation in its tracks."

Violator reached number 17 on the Billboard 200 year-end chart of 1990, and was the first Depeche Mode album to sell a million copies in the United States.

In 2020, Paste named the album the 22nd best album of 1990. Staff writer Garrett Martin wrote: "Violator was a worldwide smash that united the energy of dance music with the outsized ambitions of arena rock, and which briefly elevated Depeche Mode into the same superstar stratosphere as bands like U2 and INXS." In 2023, Matt Mitchell of Paste wrote: "As close to a blockbuster synth-pop album as we'll ever see, Depeche Mode made a record accessible to everyone from aging punks to cynical teens. The tracklist is timeless, and the songs of Violator endure 30 years later."

== Legacy ==
Violator was instrumental in turning the music press in favor of the band, which had been against them for years. The success of Violator introduced the band to a wider audience, and this increased exposure led to their 1993 follow-up album Songs of Faith and Devotion debuting at the top of the charts in both the United States and United Kingdom. "Before this, we'd been going along quite nicely," recalled Andy Fletcher. "Then when it came to Violator we inexplicably went huge. It was just incredible, and in many ways we never really recovered from that. After that, we just felt like we wanted to muck it up a bit." Miller later wrote in the 2006 re-release liner notes that "We all believed that Violator had universal appeal and a huge potential, but nobody could have predicted just how enormous it would become." Between the near-riot in LA, their ubiquitous presence on MTV, and the popularity boost from Music for the Masses and 101 the years before, Violator made Depeche Mode superstars in America in 1990.

Many people involved in the production of Violator or the band's other albums have named Violator as their favorite Depeche Mode album of all time, including Gareth Jones, Tim Simenon, David Bascombe, Daryl Bamonte and Martyn Atkins, who had created nearly all the band's album covers prior to this one.

== Track listing ==
All tracks are written by Martin L. Gore. All lead vocals by Dave Gahan, except where noted.

Side one
No.	Title	Lead vocals	Length
1.	"World in My Eyes"		4:26
2.	"Sweetest Perfection"	Gore	4:43
3.	"Personal Jesus" ( (Note: Both the original US and the original UK vinyl editions have a shorter version of 'Personal Jesus'.))		4:56
4.	"Halo"		4:30
5.	"Waiting for the Night"	Gahan; Gore	6:07

Side two
No.	Title	Lead vocals	Length
6.	"Enjoy the Silence" (includes hidden track (Note: 'Enjoy the Silence' includes hidden track 'Interlude #2 (Crucified)' at 4:21))		6:12
7.	"Policy of Truth"		4:55
8.	"Blue Dress" (includes hidden track (Note: 'Blue Dress' includes hidden track 'Interlude #3' at 4:18))	Gore	5:41
9.	"Clean"		5:32
Total length:			47:02

=== Japanese first pressing ===
A double-disc version was released in Japan. It comes in a thick double CD jewel case with the twelve-page lyric inlay booklet, sixteen-page Japanese insert, 'Enjoy the Silence' insert, and forty-page 1991 wall calendar. The second edition double CD was fixed and included 'Enjoy the Silence' (Hands and Feet mix) instead of the edited Ecstatic dub mix.

Japanese limited edition bonus CD
No.	Title	Length
1.	"Enjoy the Silence" (single version)	4:17
2.	"Enjoy the Silence" (Ecstatic dub)	5:54
3.	"Enjoy the Silence" (Ecstatic dub edit)	5:45
4.	"Sibeling" (single version)	3:13
5.	"Enjoy the Silence" (Bass Line)	7:42
6.	"Enjoy the Silence" (Harmonium)	2:42
7.	"Enjoy the Silence" (Ricki Tik Tik mix)	5:28
8.	"Memphisto" (single version)	4:01
Total length:		86:04

=== 2006 Collector's edition CD + DVD ===
Disc one (CD)
No.	Title	Length
1.	"World in My Eyes"	4:26
2.	"Sweetest Perfection"	4:43
3.	"Personal Jesus"	4:56
4.	"Halo"	4:30
5.	"Waiting for the Night"	6:07
6.	"Enjoy the Silence" (includes hidden track (Note: 'Enjoy the Silence' includes hidden track 'Interlude #2 (Crucified)' at 4:21))	6:12
7.	"Policy of Truth"	4:55
8.	"Blue Dress" (includes hidden track (Note: 'Blue Dress' includes hidden track 'Interlude #3' at 4:18))	5:41
9.	"Clean"	5:32

Disc two (DVD)
No.	Title	Length
1.	"Depeche Mode: 1989–90 (If You Wanna Use Guitars, Use Guitars)" (a short film)	32:31
2.	"World in My Eyes"	4:26
3.	"Sweetest Perfection"	4:43
4.	"Personal Jesus"	4:56
5.	"Halo"	4:30
6.	"Waiting for the Night"	6:07
7.	"Enjoy the Silence" (includes hidden track)	6:12
8.	"Policy of Truth"	4:55
9.	"Blue Dress" (includes hidden track)	5:41
10.	"Clean"	5:32
11.	"Dangerous"	4:22
12.	"Memphisto"	4:03
13.	"Sibeling"	3:18
14.	"Kaleid"	4:18
15.	"Happiest Girl" (Jack Mix)	4:58
16.	"Sea of Sin" (Tonal Mix)	4:46

== Personnel ==
Credits adapted from the liner notes of Violator.

=== Depeche Mode ===
- Alan Wilder
- David Gahan
- Andrew Fletcher
- Martin Gore

=== Technical ===
- Depeche Mode – production
- Flood – production (all tracks); mixing ("Enjoy the Silence")
- François Kevorkian – mixing (all tracks except "Enjoy the Silence")
- Daniel Miller – mixing ("Enjoy the Silence")
- Pino Pischetola – engineering
- Peter Iversen – engineering
- Steve Lyon – engineering
- Goh Hotoda – engineering
- Alan Gregorie – engineering
- Dennis Mitchell – engineering
- Phil Legg – engineering
- Daryl Bamonte – engineering assistance
- Dick Meaney – engineering assistance
- David Browne – engineering assistance
- Mark Flannery – engineering assistance

=== Artwork ===
- Anton Corbijn – sleeve
- Area – sleeve

== Charts ==
=== Weekly charts ===
1990 weekly chart performance for Violator
Chart (1990)	Peak position
Australian Albums (ARIA)	42
Austrian Albums (Ö3 Austria)	4
Belgian Albums (IFPI)	1
Canada Top Albums/CDs (RPM)	5
Dutch Albums (Album Top 100)	17
European Albums (Music & Media)	3
Finnish Albums (Suomen virallinen lista)	7
French Albums (SNEP)	1
German Albums (Offizielle Top 100)	2
Greek Albums (IFPI)	1
Icelandic Albums (Tónlist)	3
Italian Albums (Musica e dischi)	6
Japanese Albums (Oricon)	46
New Zealand Albums (RMNZ)	28
Norwegian Albums (VG-lista)	12
Spanish Albums (AFYVE)	1
Swedish Albums (Sverigetopplistan)	6
Swiss Albums (Schweizer Hitparade)	2
UK Albums (Official Charts)	2
UK Independent Albums (Gallup)	1
US Billboard 200	7

2013 weekly chart performance for Violator
Chart (2013)	Peak position
Hungarian Albums (MAHASZ)	27

2017 weekly chart performance for Violator
Chart (2017)	Peak position
Polish Albums (ZPAV)	22

2023–2025 weekly chart performance for Violator
Chart (2023–2025)	Peak position
Greek Albums (IFPI)	3
US Top Dance Albums (Billboard)	9

=== Year-end charts ===
1990 year-end chart performance for Violator
Chart (1990)	Position
Austrian Albums (Ö3 Austria)	18
Canada Top Albums/CDs (RPM)	16
European Albums (Music & Media)	5
German Albums (Offizielle Top 100)	10
Swedish Albums (Sverigetopplistan)	31
UK Albums (Gallup)	39
US Billboard 200	17

2023 year-end chart performance for Violator
Chart (2023)	Position
US Top Dance/Electronic Albums (Billboard)	22

== Certifications and sales ==
Certifications and sales for Violator
Region	Certification	Certified units/sales
Austria (IFPI Austria)	Gold	25,000^{*}
Canada (Music Canada)	2× Platinum	200,000^{^}
France (SNEP)	Platinum	300,000^{*}
Germany (BVMI)	Platinum	500,000^{^}
Italy (FIMI) 1990 sales	Platinum	250,000
Italy (FIMI) sales since 2009	Platinum	50,000^{‡}
Poland (ZPAV)	2× Platinum	40,000^{‡}
Spain (Promusicae)	Platinum	500,000
Sweden (GLF)	Gold	50,000^{^}
Switzerland (IFPI Switzerland)	Platinum	50,000^{^}
United Kingdom (BPI)	Gold	100,000^{^}
United States (RIAA)	3× Platinum	3,000,000^{^}
Summaries
Worldwide	—	7,500,000
^{*} Sales figures based on certification alone.^{^} Shipments figures based on certification alone.^{‡} Sales+streaming figures based on certification alone.
