= Little 15 =

Single by Depeche Mode

from the album Music for the Masses
- B-side: "St. Jarna (Stjärna)"; "Sonata No. 14 in C#m (Moonlight Sonata)"
- Released: May 1988
- Recorded: 1987
- Studio: Konk (London); Puk (Gjerlev, Denmark)
- Genre: New wave
- Length: 4:15
- Label: Mute
- Songwriter: Martin L. Gore
- Producers: Depeche Mode; David Bascombe

Depeche Mode singles chronology
"Behind the Wheel" (1987)	"Little 15" (1988)	"Everything Counts (live)" (1989)

Music video
- "Little 15" on YouTube

"Little 15" is a song by the English electronic music band Depeche Mode, released in May 1988 as the fourth single from their sixth studio album, Music for the Masses (1987).

Influenced by the classical music composer Michael Nyman, "Little 15" was the only single released during Depeche Mode's time with Mute Records not to be assigned a "BONG" catalog number. Instead, it was assigned the catalogue number "LITTLE15", as it was released after their single "Behind the Wheel" (1987), designated "BONG15".

The song saw moderate chart success in some of the eight European countries in which it was released, the highest of which was number 16 in West Germany.

== Recording ==
Depeche Mode's songwriter, Martin Gore, had prepared demos of songs he thought would be appropriate for their new album in mid-1986 at his home studio in London, and among them was a demo of the song that would become "Little 15". Although Gore wrote the demos for the album's songs, it was left to band member and music producer Alan Wilder to arrange, produce and record the songs into the final versions of the songs that would appear on the album. "Little 15" was one of the last songs to come together during the recording sessions for Music for the Masses, as Wilder struggled to determine how to structure and arrange the track until the band went to see the film A Zed & Two Noughts (1985), after which Wilder decided to try to arrange the song based on the film's soundtrack by Michael Nyman. Wilder found that once he arranged the song in that style, the song came together easily. Co-producer David Bascombe called the album version of the track "classic Wilder" in its use of orchestral samples, which was quite different than the original demo. Wilder described the musical sequence that pervades the song as "hypnotic".

"Little 15" was recorded at Konk studio in London and mixed at Puk Recording Studios in Gjerlev, Denmark.

== Release ==
Originally, the single was intended only to be released in West Germany and France, but was instead released in eight European countries: the United Kingdom, West Germany, Italy, Belgium, The Netherlands, Italy, Spain, and France. Released by Mute Records on 7" and 12" vinyl, the song's title contributed to its special catalogue number of "LITTLE15". Up until that point, every Depeche Mode single release by Mute Records in the United Kingdom had been assigned a "BONG" catalogue number designation, but the previous single, "Behind the Wheel", was released with catalogue number "BONG15" the year before. The official release date of the single is slightly disputed: Depeche Mode's official web site lists the release date as 16 May 1988, while the Depeche Mode biography Depeche Mode: Monument lists the release date as 18 May 1988. Gore said that, when Mute France asked for the song to be a single, "we just looked at them and said 'You're mad, 'Little 15' is not a single', ... and was it a massive hit? No! Was it a hit? No!"

"Little 15" saw moderate chart success: in the United Kingdom, it reached number 60; in West Germany it hit number 16; in Austria it reached number 25; and in Switzerland it entered the Top 20 and reached number 18.

There was no remix of the song at the time of release, however, there are two piano instrumental B-sides, both performed by Alan Wilder. The first is "Stjärna", Swedish for 'star', but it was mislabelled as "St. Jarna" on the label. In 1993, Gore called "Stjärna" his favourite Depeche Mode instrumental that he'd ever written. The 12" single also contains a performance of Ludwig van Beethoven's "Moonlight Sonata#14". According to his website, Wilder did not intend for his performance to be recorded and released, as he was performing the song as a warm-up, but Gore stealthily recorded it. Wilder did not perform the piece perfectly, with a slight error occurring near the end of the song.

=== Music video ===
The music video for "Little 15" was one of the few not directed by Anton Corbijn from this period. According to Wilder, they chose Martyn Atkins, who had designed many of their album and single covers to this point in time, to direct this video only because they thought it would be interesting to give the assignment to someone new.

== Reception ==
In a positive review for AllMusic, Ned Raggett highlighted the song's "subtle orchestrations" and "David Gahan's subtly impassioned performance" and also observed that "it's nowhere near as immediate or catchy as 'Never Let Me Down Again' or 'Behind the Wheel'."

== Other releases ==
"Little 15" appeared in its original form on The Singles 86–98 (1998) and as a remix on Remixes 81–04 (2004).

== Track listing ==
No.	Title	Writer(s)	Length
1.	"Little 15"	Martin L. Gore	4:15
2.	"St. Jarna (Stjärna)"	Gore	4:28

12-inch and CD single
No.	Title	Writer(s)	Length
3.	"Sonata No. 14 in C#m (Moonlight Sonata)"	Ludwig van Beethoven	5:37

== Charts ==
Chart (1988)	Peak position
Austria (Ö3 Austria Top 40)	25
Europe (Eurochart Hot 100 Singles)	59
Italy Airplay (Music & Media)	18
Switzerland (Schweizer Hitparade)	18
UK Singles (Official Charts)	60
UK Indie (OCC)	4
West Germany (GfK)	16
