= Behind the Wheel =

1987 single by Depeche Mode

Single by Depeche Mode

from the album Music for the Masses
- B-side: "Route 66"
- Released: 28 December 1987
- Recorded: 1986–1987
- Studio: Guillaume Tell (Paris); Konk (London); Puk (Gjerlev, Denmark)
- Genre: Dance-rock; alternative dance; new wave
- Length: 5:18
- Label: Mute
- Songwriter: Martin L. Gore
- Producers: Depeche Mode; David Bascombe

Depeche Mode singles chronology
"Never Let Me Down Again" (1987)	"Behind the Wheel" (1987)	"Little 15" (1988)

Music video
- "Behind the Wheel" on YouTube

"Behind the Wheel" is a song by the English electronic music band Depeche Mode from their sixth studio album, Music for the Masses (1987). It was released December 1987 as the album's third single, reaching number 21 in the United Kingdom and number six in both Switzerland and West Germany.

== Recording ==
"Behind the Wheel" was written by Martin Gore as part of the recording sessions for the band's sixth studio album, Music for the Masses. The demo was prepared by Gore at his home studio in London in mid-1986, along with the other tracks from the album. Although Gore wrote the demos, it was left to band member and music producer Alan Wilder to arrange, produce and record the songs into the final versions of the songs that would appear on the album. Recording for the song took place between sessions at Studio Guillaume Tell near Paris, France and Konk studios in London, England. Mixing of the track took place at Puk Recording Studios in Denmark.

The song has a sequence of four chords that keep cycling, which Wilder compared to Penrose stairs; "once you get around [to the top], you're back at the bottom again. That's kind of how the chord sequence works [in the song]." "Behind the Wheel" incorporated some of Gore's guitar playing, who played his Gretsch guitar for the part. Wilder said the song's bassline was made up of three components: "a hand striking the end of a Hoover tube and then sampled, a guitar-pluck sampled and pitched down, and a Minimoog for added bottom end."

== Release ==
"Behind the Wheel" was released on 28 December 1987 by Mute Records in the UK, Sire Records in the US and Intercord Records in West Germany. In the UK, the release saw a wide variety of vinyl releases, some of which have become valuable collector's items if they can be found: a 7" test pressing (catalogue number SBONG15), a regular 7" single (7BONG15), a promotional 7" containing a unique mix (DJBONG15), a 12" single (12BONG15), a limited 12" single (L12BONG15), and a promotional 12" single (DBONG15). In West Germany, 12" and limited 12" vinyl singles were released with initial pressings in orange vinyl and yellow vinyl, respectively, with catalogue numbers INT 126.87 and INT 126.876. The US saw unique mixes that combined "Behind the Wheel" and "Route 66" into a single remix, issued on 7" and 12" vinyl and released in April 1988.

The single version of the song was remixed by the American music producer Shep Pettibone. His version was chosen for release because the band felt it was more danceable than the album version. The B-side, a cover version of the Bobby Troup song "(Get Your Kicks on) Route 66" was chosen because Gore said he "thought it would be a good idea to record a driving song on the B-side of 'Behind the Wheel'". "Route 66" was remixed by the Beatmasters and was made up from elements of "Behind the Wheel".

When the single started to rise in the charts, Depeche Mode were invited to perform the song on the BBC's Top of the Pops, which they did on 7 January 1988.

Remixes of "Behind the Wheel" appear on compilations The Singles 86–98 (1998) and Remixes 2: 81–11 (2011).

== Music video ==
The music video was directed by Anton Corbijn near Málaga, Spain. It was included on the Strange (1988) compilation, The Videos 86–98 (1988), and their Video Singles Collection (2016).

== Critical reception ==
Cash Box called it a "dark, European funk tune for those who dance with a touch of sadness" that is "very strange, yet appealing."

In 1989, the single was ranked number 30 on Spin magazine's list of "The 100 Greatest Singles of All Time".

== Live performances ==
"Behind the Wheel" has been performed on a variety of Depeche Mode tours, including the 1987–1988 Music for the Masses tour, a performance of which was released on 101 (1989), the 2005–2006 Touring the Angel, released on Touring the Angel: Live in Milan (2006), and the 2009–2010 Tour of the Universe, released on Tour of the Universe: Barcelona 20/21.11.09 (2010).

== Track listings ==
"Behind the Wheel" was written by Martin L. Gore. "Route 66" was written by Robert William Troup Jr.

=== 7": Mute / 7Bong15 (UK) ===
1. "Behind the Wheel" (remix) – 4:03
2. "Route 66" – 4:11

=== 12": Mute / 12Bong15 (UK) ===
1. "Behind the Wheel" (Shep Pettibone mix) – 5:56
2. "Route 66" (Beatmasters mix) – 6:19

=== 12": Mute / L12Bong15 (UK) ===
1. "Behind the Wheel" (Beatmasters mix) – 8:00
2. "Route 66" (Casualty mix) – 10:40 (remixed by Dave Allen)

=== CD: Mute / CDBong15 (UK) ===
1. "Behind the Wheel" (7" remix) – 4:03
2. "Route 66" – 4:11
3. "Behind the Wheel" (Shep Pettibone mix) – 5:56
4. "Behind the Wheel" (LP mix) – 5:19

=== CD: Mute / CDBong15 (UK) ===
1. "Behind the Wheel" (remix) – 4:03
2. "Route 66" – 4:11
3. "Behind the Wheel" (Shep Pettibone mix) – 5:56
4. "Route 66" (Beatmasters mix) – 6:19
5. "Behind the Wheel" (Beatmasters mix) – 8:00
6. "Route 66" (Casualty mix) – 10:40
7. "Behind the Wheel" (LP mix) – 5:19
- The second CD is the 1992 re-release.

=== Cassette maxi-single: Mute / CBong15 (UK) ===
1. "Behind the Wheel" (Shep Pettibone mix) – 5:56
2. "Route 66" (Beatmasters mix) – 6:19
3. "Behind the Wheel" (LP mix) – 5:19

=== 7": Sire / 7-27991 (US) ===
1. "Behind the Wheel" (remix) – 4:03
2. "Route 66/Behind the Wheel" (mega-single mix) – 4:13 (remixed by Ivan Ivan)

=== 12": Sire / 0-20858 (US) ===
1. "Behind the Wheel/Route 66" (megamix) – 7:48 (remixed by Ivan Ivan)
2. "Behind the Wheel/Route 66" (megadub) – 6:10 (remixed by Ivan Ivan)
3. "Behind the Wheel" (extended remix) – 5:56
4. "Behind the Wheel" (Beatmasters mix) – 8:00

=== 12": Sire / PRO-A-2952 (US promo) ===
1. "Behind the Wheel" (extended remix) – 5:56
2. "Behind the Wheel" (dub) – 5:53
3. "Behind the Wheel" (Beatmasters mix) – 8:00
4. "Behind the Wheel" (7" DJ remix) – 3:48

=== CD: Sire / PRO-CD-2953 (US promo) ===
1. "Behind the Wheel" (remix) – 4:03
2. "Behind the Wheel/Route 66" (mega-single mix) – 4:29 (remixed by Ivan Ivan)
3. "Route 66/Behind the Wheel" (mega-single mix) – 4:12
4. "Behind the Wheel/Route 66" (Megamix) – 7:48 (remixed by Ivan Ivan)
5. "Behind the Wheel" (Beatmasters mix) – 8:00
6. "Behind the Wheel" (extended remix) – 5:56

== Charts ==
=== Weekly charts ===
Weekly chart performance for "Behind the Wheel"
Chart (1988)	Peak position
Europe (European Hot 100 Singles)	16
Finland (Suomen virallinen lista)	15
France (SNEP)	21
Ireland (IRMA)	16
Spain (AFYVE)	19
Sweden (Sverigetopplistan)	10
Switzerland (Schweizer Hitparade)	6
UK Singles (Official Charts)	21
UK Indie (OCC)	1
US Billboard Hot 100 with "Route 66"	61
US Dance Club Songs (Billboard) with "Route 66"	3
US Dance Singles Sales (Billboard) with "Route 66"	10
US Cash Box Top 100 Singles with "Route 66"	81
West Germany (GfK)	6

=== Year-end charts ===
Year-end chart performance for "Behind the Wheel"
Chart (1988)	Position
US Dance Club Play (Billboard) with "Route 66"	16
West Germany (Media Control)	68

== Behind the Wheel 2011 ==
"Behind the Wheel 2011"

Promotional single by Depeche Mode

from the album Remixes 2: 81–11
- Released: 6 June 2011
- Recorded: 1987 (vocals); 2011 (instrumentation)
- Genre: House
- Length: 6:42 (album), 3:36 (radio edit)
- Label: Mute
- Songwriter: Martin L. Gore
- Producer: Vince Clarke

"Behind the Wheel 2011" (Reprise / Rhino / Mute PRCD-400205) is a US-only promotional CD single, released in 2011. The title track is a remix made by former Depeche Mode member Vince Clarke for the band's Remixes 2: 81–11 album. The single was promotional only, and not for sale. It reached number three on the Billboard's Hot Dance Club Play chart in 2011.

Track listing

1. "Behind the Wheel 2011" (Vince Clarke extended vocal) – 6:42
2. "Behind the Wheel 2011" (Mark Picchiotti re-edited Vince Clarke dub) – 6:44
3. "Behind the Wheel 2011" (Mark Picchiotti re-edited Vince Clarke radio mix) – 3:36
