= Music for the Masses =

1987 studio album by Depeche Mode

Studio album by Depeche Mode
- Released: 28 September 1987
- Recorded: September 1986 – July 1987
- Studios: Guillaume Tell (Paris); Konk (London); Puk (Gjerlev, Denmark)
- Genres: Synth-pop; electropop; new wave
- Length: 44:04
- Label: Mute
- Producers: Depeche Mode; David Bascombe

Depeche Mode chronology
Greatest Hits (1987)	Music for the Masses (1987)	101 (1989)

Singles from Music for the Masses
- 1. "Strangelove" Released: 13 April 1987; 2. "Never Let Me Down Again" Released: 24 August 1987; 3. "Behind the Wheel" Released: 28 December 1987; 4. "Little 15" Released: May 1988

Music for the Masses is the sixth studio album by the English electronic band Depeche Mode, released on 28 September 1987 by Mute Records in the United Kingdom and Sire Records in the United States. The follow-up to their successful album Black Celebration (1986), it was co-produced by Depeche Mode and David Bascombe. Recorded in Paris and London and mixed in Denmark, it was the first Depeche Mode album to see band member Alan Wilder take control of the production.

The album marked a turning point in the band's sound, blending dark, introspective themes with expansive production. Its release also marked a shift in visual identity, with Anton Corbijn's involvement in music videos and promotional materials helping to redefine the band's aesthetic. Music for the Masses was considered instrumental in helping the band achieve chart success and popularity in the US, which up until then had eluded them. It reached number 10 in the UK, number 35 in the US and number 2 in West Germany. Certified platinum in the US in 1991, it was estimated in 2023 that it had sold over 5.5 million copies globally.

Music for the Masses was included in the book 1001 Albums You Must Hear Before You Die (2006) and Slant Magazine's list of the 100 Best Albums of the 1980s. The title and songs inspired the tribute album For the Masses (1998), which itself had chart success in both the US and Germany.

The album spawned four successful singles, "Strangelove", "Never Let Me Down Again", "Behind the Wheel", and "Little 15", all of which charted in the top 10 in charts in various regions around the world. It was supported by the 1987–1988 Music for the Masses Tour, which helped to further launch their fame in the United States when they performed at the Rose Bowl in Pasadena, California to over 70,000 fans, captured in the live album and video documentary 101 (1989).

== Background ==
Depeche Mode had released their fifth album Black Celebration in early 1986, followed up with a supporting tour which lasted through the middle of that year, and contributed the song "But Not Tonight" to the soundtrack to the film Modern Girls (1986). While the album and tour were the band's most successful to date, they were still considered outsiders to mainstream music.

By the time the group entered the studio in late 1986 to record Music for the Masses, singer Dave Gahan and his wife Jo Fox Gahan were expecting their first child, and songwriter Martin Gore had moved back to London from West Berlin after ending his relationship with his girlfriend of four years, Christina Friedrich.

== Recording ==
=== Production ===
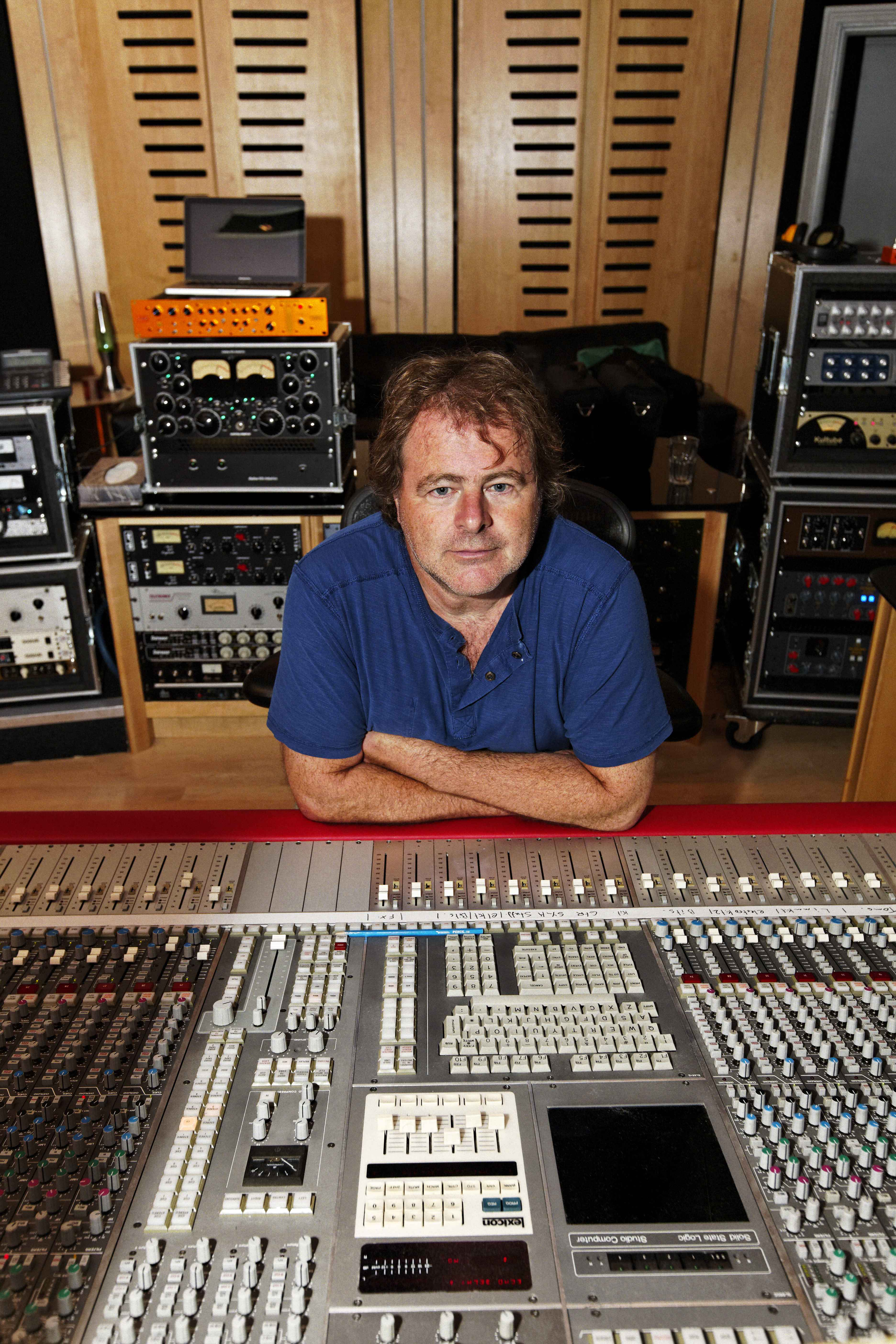
Music for the Masses was co-produced by David Bascombe

Following the end of their Black Celebration Tour, Depeche Mode reconvened in the second half of 1986 to begin production of their new album. During previous recording sessions in 1985 for the single "Shake the Disease" and early 1986 for the album Black Celebration, tensions had grown between Daniel Miller, their long-time producer and label manager, and the band, due to interpersonal conflicts and the claustrophobic nature of the sessions. Citing those tensions and his own increased workload with Mute Records, Miller stepped away from the studio, and as such was not involved in the production of a Depeche Mode album for the first time since the Speak & Spell sessions in 1981. Similarly, Gareth Jones, who had worked with Depeche Mode as a producer on their previous two albums — and another source of tension over the previous two years — was also not involved in production for Music for the Masses. Band member Alan Wilder was effectively the third music producer for Black Celebration, alongside Miller and Jones; his role grew naturally out of his own interests in production and recording, and none of the other members of Depeche Mode had shown any interest in that aspect of creating albums. Despite this, collectively the band elected to find a new outside producer to aid in recording the album, and after talking to a few candidates, they offered the role to David Bascombe, who had previously worked as a recording engineer with Peter Gabriel on his song "Sledgehammer" (1986) and with Tears for Fears on their album Songs from the Big Chair (1985).

=== Demos ===
Songwriter Gore had written his demos at his London home on an Akai synthesiser. Bascombe, after accepting the band's offer, met with them at Wilder's home studio around August 1986 to listen to demos that Gore had prepared, which were played through a Yamaha synthesiser, according to an interview with Bascombe in 2020. Band member Andy Fletcher commended the quality of Gore's demos, saying:

"Over the years Martin [Gore]'s studio at home has got progressively better and better so the demos he was producing and giving to us were very good quality. If you listen to a song, say 'Strangelove' which was a very full demo, after about 20 plays the direction in which you're going to go is pretty much fixed. We were basically re-recording Martin's demos with better sound, better production and Dave's vocals."

Bascombe later described the demos as "very glam", although most of the songs did not retain the glam style in their final recorded forms. After listening to the demos as a group, some of the demos were accepted as they were, some were rejected, and some, such as "Strangelove", spawned lengthy discussions. The single version of "Strangelove" was programmed at Wilder's home studio using his Allen & Heath mixing desk and a Fostex 16-track recorder before the band moved on to a proper recording studio.

=== Recording and mixing sessions ===
To force themselves to try new things, they decided to find a recording studio they had not yet recorded at, and chose Studio Guillaume Tell just outside of Paris, which they rented starting around September 1986.

As they had done on their previous several albums, the band immediately set out to find and record new sounds for use as samples on the album, which took three days. Wilder noted that, as they had on their previous albums, the band was always looking to make the album differently from their last, and did not want to repeat a formula. For Construction Time Again (1983), Some Great Reward (1984) and Black Celebration (1986), they had gathered most of their samples outside of the studio, so to avoid repetition, they created most of their new samples in the studio, although they did end up recording a few on the streets of Paris. Studio Guillaume Tell was converted from an old theater, and as such there were old instruments left there that the band used to sample and record with, including a grand piano and old orchestral bass drums and timpanis. In this way, the band built a library of new samples to be used on the album. While Music for the Masses saw the band using heavy amounts of sampling, they also decided to use more guitar in the production of their songs. Despite their all-synth reputation, Depeche Mode had used guitars in their songs as early as 1982, starting with the single "Get the Balance Right!". Gore's guitar style on the record was described in a retrospective review by ClassicPopMag as "never flashy", rather, "his simple, repetitive riffs just sit on a groove, adding another textural element and human grit into the mix."

Bascombe, although hired as a producer, fell more into an audio engineer role in the studio. Instead, Wilder was described as the person "steering the ship", as he was the one most interested in the process of recording and producing the music. Wilder, as the one with the vision for how the album should sound, said that "It was very important to have a focus for each track. ... Each song, let's have an idea, a theme for how we're going to try and approach this. As a result of Bascombe's engineering influence, Wilder's production style and the use of reverb in the songs, Bascombe and later reviews described the sound of the songs and album overall as "epic" and "orchestral". The recording process was described as 3-step: Gore would write the basic song, then Wilder would perform and arrange the songs on his own at his home studio, and then the band would meet at the studio to record the final versions together. Gore, if he was unhappy with the way an arrangement was made would work through Fletcher to avoid confrontation, as he had done since Wilder joined the band in 1982.

Overall, compared to the tense production of Black Celebration, the atmosphere within the studio for these sessions was described as "relaxed", although the band did work seven days a week while in the studio, usually mid-day to midnight. Wilder played most of the piano parts on the grand piano that was found at the studio, with Gahan later saying "[Wilder] is a fantastic piano player, and I don't think we appreciated it at the time." In talking to the press around the time of the album's release, Gahan said that, in creating the album, the band were "conscious of building up atmospheres, heightening the songs to an absolutely massive feeling and then bringing them down again. We had discovered dynamics. It was our first truly arranged album", calling the sound "electronic metal".

In later interviews, Bascombe remembered that the band had a set of rules about what they did or didn't want to do when recording their album, which he had to figure out as they went along. For example, the band had a "no chords" rule — where if they wanted to play a chord, they had to assemble one from separate monophonic parts. Other rules the band followed included "no presets" and "no hi-hats", and for samples, "all samples must be original", and "no sample could be used twice". Generally, they stuck to these rules, although almost every rule was broken at least once. Said Bascombe, "you might think you're giving yourself a hard time for the sake of it, it did certainly give them a unique sound and a unique approach."

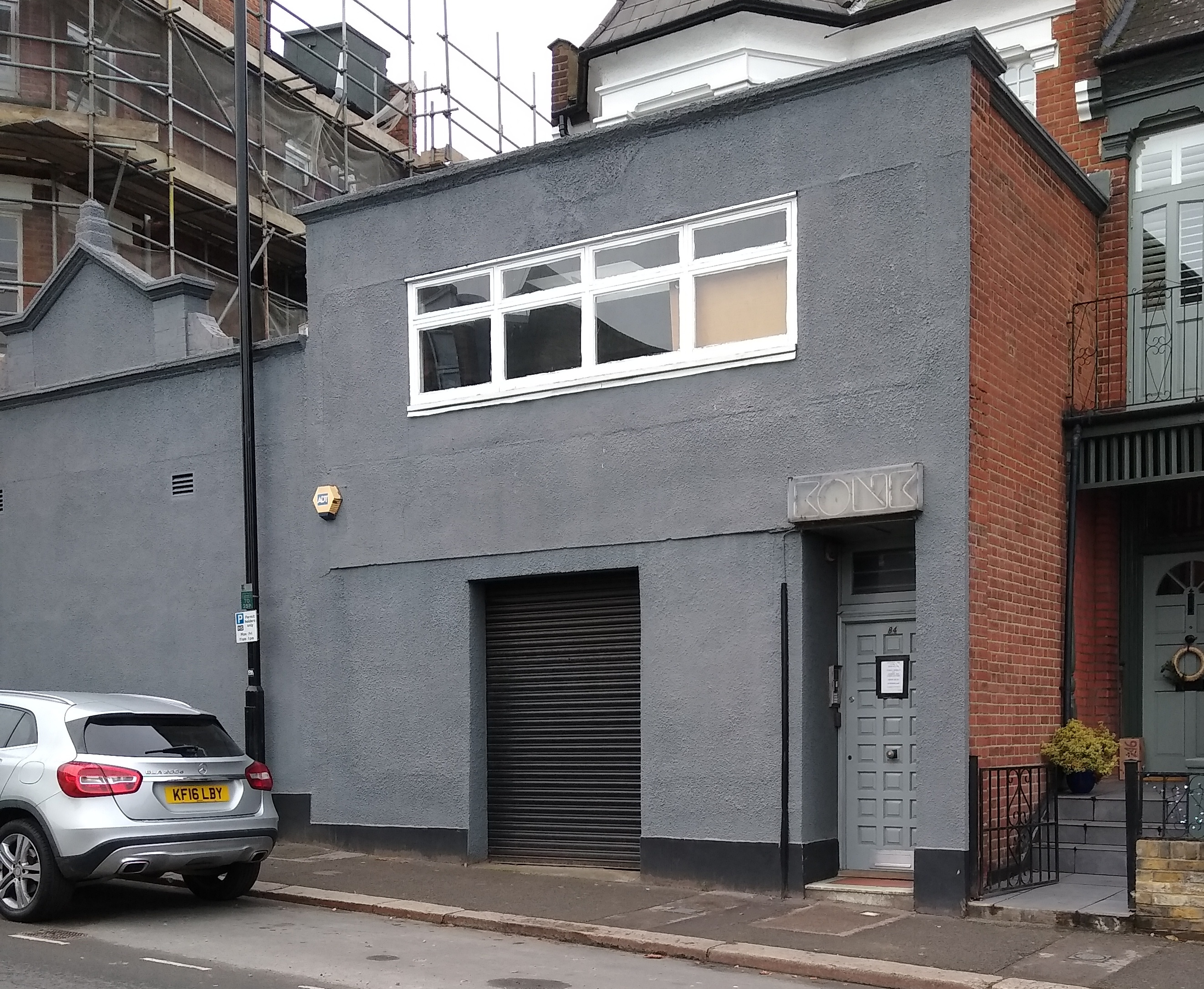
The front entrance of Konk Studios in London, where most of the vocals for Music for the Masses were recorded.

After six weeks at Studio Guillaume Tell the band took a brief holiday and shot the video for "Strangelove" before moving on to Konk studio in London. Wilder explained the break and change of venue, saying "Every time you go in the studio, the first couple of weeks are the most enthusiastic – by the end of a longish period, everyone's edgy, and you get less done. Last week in Paris, everyone was fed up and wanted to get home." Wilder was also unimpressed with the facilities at Studio Guillaume Tell, saying, "From the point of view of facilities, it was just about adequate. But the control room was dingy." Bascombe said that the vibe of recording changed after the move to London, since the band could go back to their homes at the end of the night, and noted that some of the samples used on the album were recorded in an old stairwell at Konk because it had such great acoustics. Most of the album's vocals were recorded at Konk, and in a contemporary interview, Fletcher said that "about half the album" was recorded there. Both Gore and Gahan tended to get their vocal takes completed quickly, and neither needed much coaching for the songs.

After recording was complete at Konk, they moved to Puk Recording Studios in Denmark to mix the album. They moved to Puk for a change of scenery, which gave them a chance to focus on the task of mixing the album; Puk was "in the middle of nowhere", so they weren't distracted by going out to clubs. Miller joined the band at Puk to help with the final mix of Music for the Masses and also mixed the single for "Strangelove", which was released five months before the album.

=== Equipment ===
Besides the instruments found at Studio Guillaume Tell, equipment used to record the album included an ARP 2600, Mini Moog, RSF Kobol, Emulator II, Synclavier, and Gore's Gretsch guitar. They also used a Fairlight CMI Series 3 synthesiser and an old EMS Synthi AKS, which Wilder described as "really old, and it comes in a briefcase, like a businessman's case. It looks amazing, really James Bond. It's a noise machine, really." Of the use of the synthesisers on the record, Wilder said:

"There's an old Moog modular system that I've been after for a while. People get rid of those things after they've lost interest in them, but they can produce brilliant sounds, very unique sounds. We've got an old ARP sequencer that produces a sound all of its own as well. Basically, you can get anything converted to accept MIDI or CV & Gate. ... Drums we would nearly always do into the Synclavier, to get the high transients. (Note: "High transients" refers to the sharp, fast attack portion of drum sounds—especially the initial hit or strike that gives percussion its punch and clarity.) But there are some sounds that work well in the Emulator, as it's not quite such good quality. The old original Emulators used to bring a sort of grittiness to a sample because of their low sampling rate."

Music for the Masses was Depeche Mode's first album recorded entirely digitally.

== Songs ==
Of the number of songs recorded during the Music for the Masses sessions overall, Fletcher said "we've recorded fifteen songs of which nine or ten will end up on the album." Music for the Masses was released with 11 songs including one hidden track, and an additional five songs were released as B-sides on singles from the album: "Agent Orange", "Stjarna", a recording of Wilder performing Ludwig van Beethoven's "Moonlight Sonata", a cover of Bobby Troup's "(Get Your Kicks on) Route 66", and "Pleasure, Little Treasure".

=== Side one ===
"Never Let Me Down Again", the album's opening track and second single, was described by Gore as a "stand-out" track that was especially effective when played live. Samples used in the song include drums from their own 1986 single "Stripped" and Led Zeppelin's song "When the Levee Breaks". A sample from Carl Orff's Carmina Burana was also incorporated into the track. Gore's guitar part for the song was recorded at Puk Studios, filtered through their ARP 2600 synthesiser. Wilder called it his favorite song on the album and his second favorite Depeche Mode song of all time. It has become a staple of Depeche Mode's live performances, featuring on every tour since.

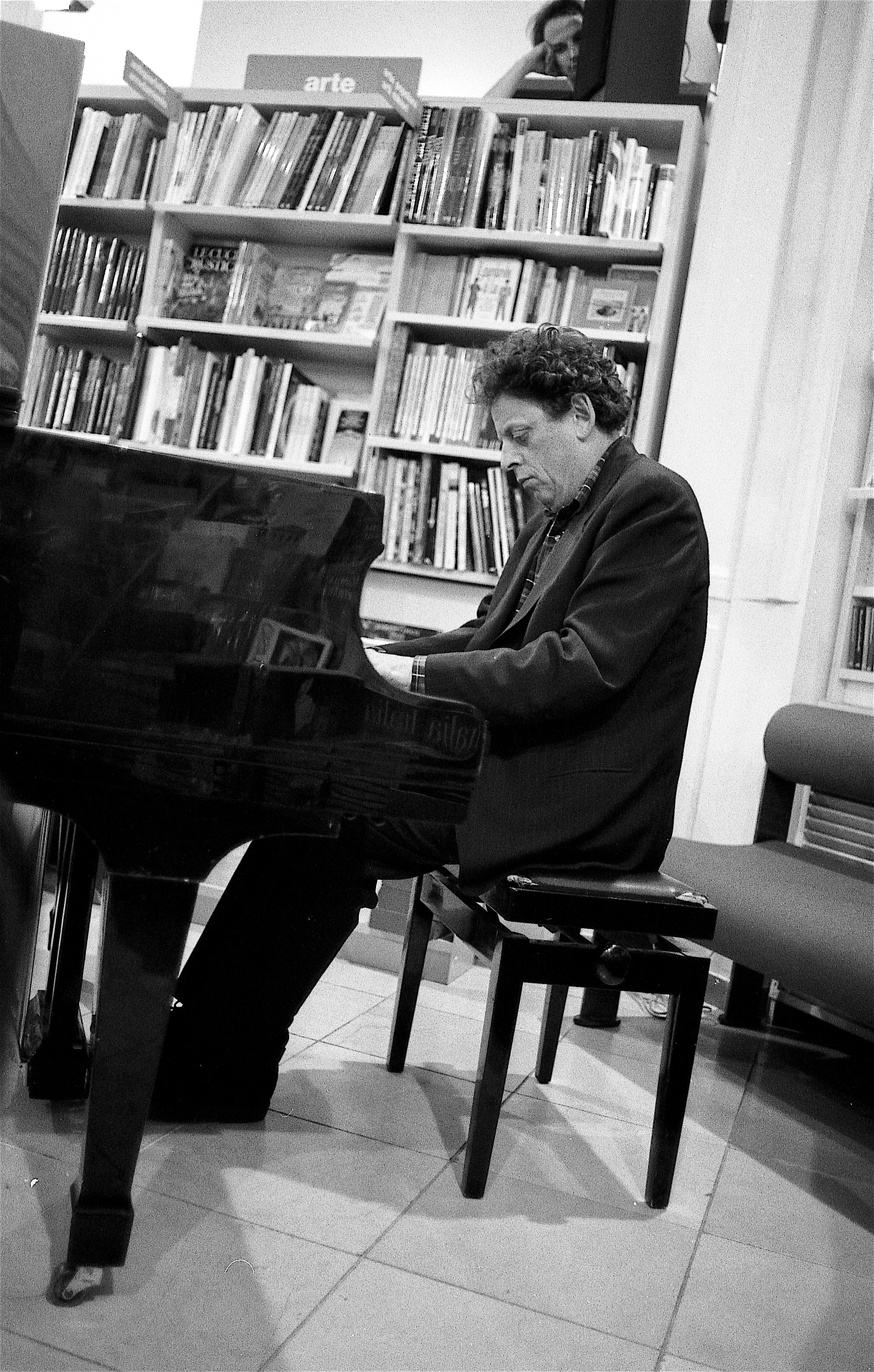
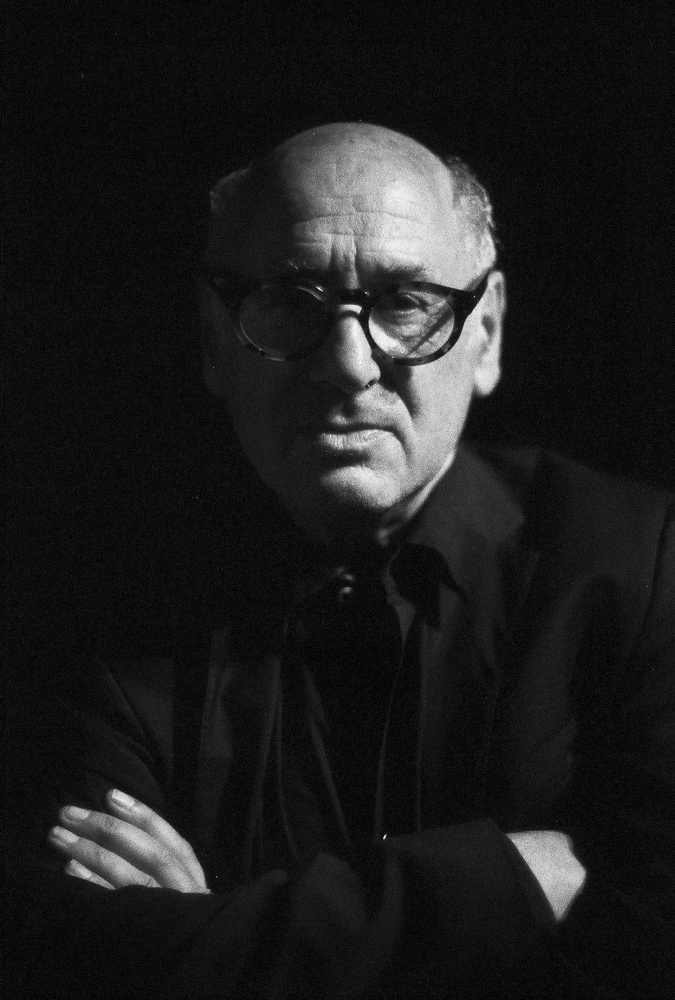
Experimental and classical composers Philip Glass (left, pictured in 1993) and Michael Nyman (right, pictured in 2015) influenced the sound and arrangements of "Pimpf" and "Little 15", respectively.

The side's second song, "The Things You Said" was described in the biography Depeche Mode: Faith and Devotion as a song that "[digs] deep into the psyche to dissect fear, vulnerability, and relationships."

"Strangelove", the album's first single and third track, was described as a "minor-key pop single ... [that was] still a long way off from mainstream." The initial single mix for the track was described by Wilder as "cluttered", so the band remixed the song for the album, using one of Miller's Puk remixes as a guide.

"Sacred", the album's fourth track, was described by Bascombe as the song on the album that retained the "glam" aspect of Gore's original demo the most. An early mix of the song which Bascombe prefers did not make the album and was later released on YouTube. Bascombe said that the album mix was "fine", but "it just could have been better."

The closing track to side one, "Little 15", was one of the last songs to come together during the album's recording sessions, with Wilder struggling to determine how to structure and arrange the track. During the sessions, the band collectively went to see the film A Zed & Two Noughts (1985), and Wilder decided to try to arrange the song based on the film's soundtrack by Michael Nyman. Wilder said that once he tried Nyman's style for the song, "from there, it was easy. It just flowed." Bascombe called the final version of the track "classic Wilder" in its use of orchestral samples, which was quite different than the original demo. Released as the fourth single from the album, its music video was one of the few not directed by Anton Corbijn from this period. According to Wilder, they chose Martyn Atkins, who had designed many of their album and single covers to this point in time, to direct this video only because they thought it would be interesting to give the assignment to someone new.

=== Side two ===
"Behind the Wheel", the first song of the album's second side and third single from the album, has a sequence of four chords that keep cycling, which Wilder compared to Penrose stairs; "once you get around [to the top], you're back at the bottom again. That's kind of how the chord sequence works [in the song]." This track incorporated some of Gore's guitar playing, who played his Gretsch guitar for the part.

"I Want You Now", described in a retrospective review as "erotically charged", incorporated the sound of an accordion being played with its keys open, resulting in an atmospheric breathing sound. The band also incorporated some sounds from a pornographic video into the song, augmented with the help of some local women who they brought into the studio to do additional heavy breathing into their microphones. The recordings were all sampled through what was then their state-of-the art Fairlight CMI Series 3 synthesiser. "I Want You Now" was released as a promotional single in Japan.

"To Have and to Hold" was released with two versions on the album. The version sequenced as part of the album was Wilder's version of the song, deliberately made darker than the demo. The "Spanish Taster" bonus track was closer to Gore's original demo, which he fought to be included on the album in that form. According to Wilder, there was no friction within the band about having two versions; he and Gore simply had different visions for the song.

"Nothing" appeared in remixed form on the US-only "Strangelove '88" single in 1988. Depeche Mode generally had a rule against the use of Hi-hats in their songs, and while "Nothing" sounded like it did, it was in fact the sound of a pneumatic door closing that made such an interesting noise that the band chose to sample and use it.

The album's closing track is an instrumental called "Pimpf". Originally intended as only a B-side to the single release of "Strangelove", the band liked Bascombe's mix of "Pimpf" enough to include it as the closing track of the album, which Bascombe said was his favorite mix of all the songs from the entire album. For the song, Wilder said that it "starts off with one little riff that just feeds on itself. ... You've got this one thing and we just keep adding and adding and adding to it." This was a recurring theme for this and several other songs on the album inspired by the music of Philip Glass, with Wilder elaborating that "quite a lot of the tracks on [the album] do go in that way where they just keep going on a theme and build and build and build. ... Again, I'd been listening to a lot of Philip Glass at the time, and the minimalists." "Pimpf" was described in the Depeche Mode Monument biography as having "an almost threatening intensity". The name is a reference to recruits of the Deutsches Jungvolk, a division of the Hitler Youth meant for those members who were ages 10–14, who were called Pimpfe.

== Title and artwork ==
Band members Fletcher and Gore both explained the album's title was conceived as a joke, after Gore found an old album called Music for the Millions. Fletcher said, "The title's ... a bit tongue-in-cheek, really. Everyone is telling us we should make more commercial music, so that's the reason we chose that title." According to Gore, the title "was a joke on the uncommerciality of [the album]. It was anything but music for the masses!" Miller agreed, saying that the name Music for the Masses was "about how Depeche Mode were forever destined to be a cult band who could never quite crack the mainstream," disproved by the success of Depeche Mode's subsequent tours and albums. French magazine Best also suggested that the title could be a nod to socialism, reflected in the style of the artwork of earlier albums and singles, like Construction Time Again (1983) and "Get the Balance Right!" (1982), which Fletcher dismissed as more of a "wink" than a political stance.

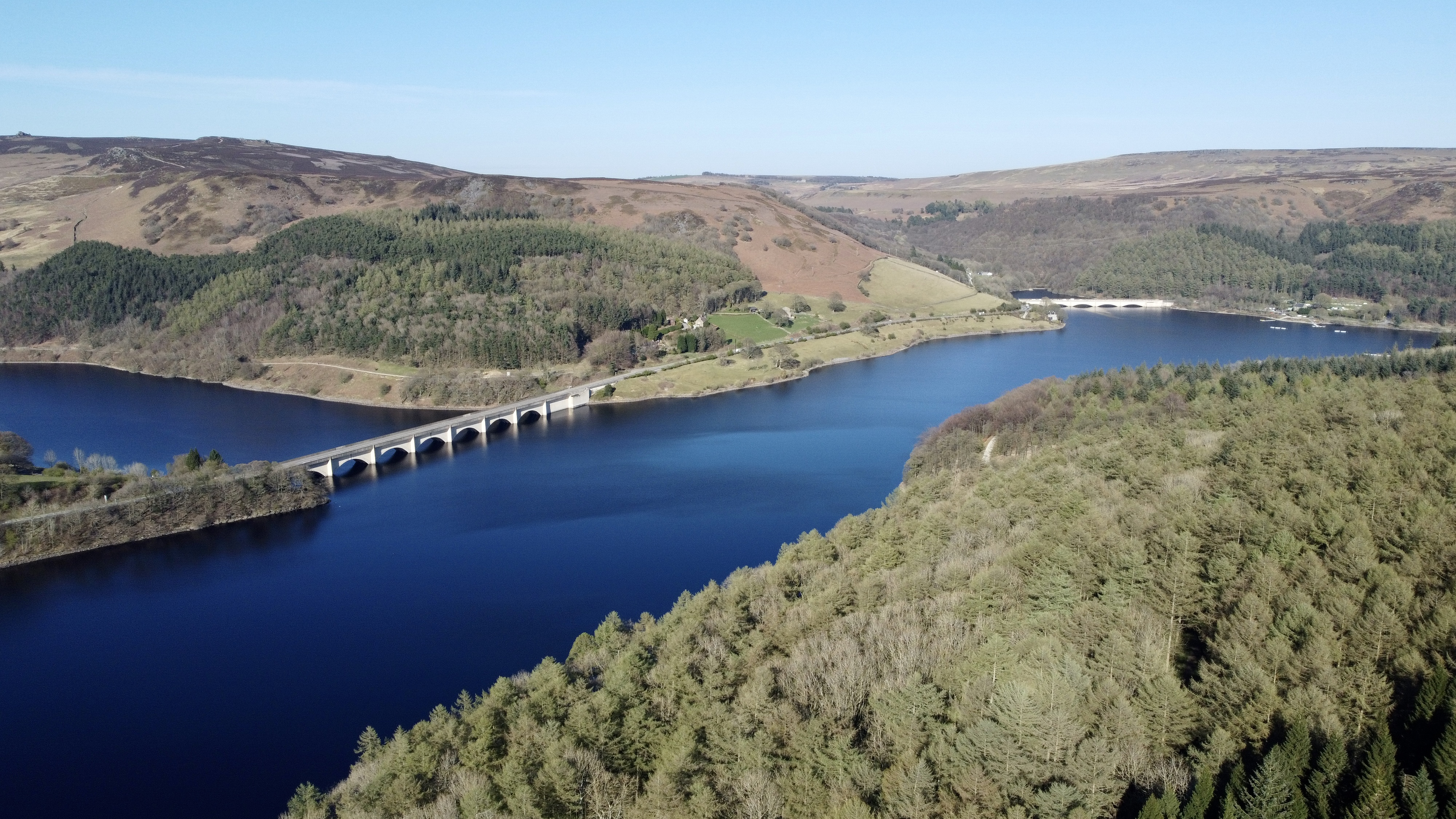
A view of Ladybower Reservoir (pictured in 2021), where Martyn Atkins took some of the album's photographs.

The megaphone iconography represented on the album's cover was utilized extensively during the album's release: at press events, on the covers of the album's singles and 12" releases, and during the supporting Music for the Masses tour. Wilder gave credit to Martyn Atkins, who had been a longtime Depeche Mode collaborator, for the use of the megaphone, saying that "[Martyn came] up with this idea of a speaker, but, to give the kind of ironic element which the title has, to put this speaker in a setting which wasn't really to do with the masses at all. It was, in fact, the opposite. So you end up with this kind of eerie thing where you get these speakers or megaphones in the middle of a setting that doesn't suit it at all, like a desert or whatever." Atkins took the megaphone, mounted it to a pole, and drove up to the Peak District in north-central England to take pictures of it. Atkins said that the music inspired him, because the sound was so "big", saying that it felt like Eastern European propaganda, and he knew the iconography of the loudspeaker could carry over to merchandise. Atkins called the cover his favourite of all the Depeche Mode album covers he was involved in. Similarly to how the album's title was conceived as a joke, he felt that the grand imagery of the album was, in a way, "the opposite of these four lads from Basildon."

An earlier cover also designed by Atkins was test-printed, but ultimately not used. One copy of the test print was sold at auction by Wilder in 2011. It features a white-and-orange stylised design of the megaphone emitting sound waves. This alternate artwork was planned to be used for a budget series of albums, but the project was scrapped.

== Release and promotion ==
Depeche Mode began a press circuit in mid-1987 to support the album, appearing on the magazine covers of Smash Hits, Underground, French Best, and Sounds. Gore said in the interview with Underground that they had been offered, but turned down, opportunities to score soundtracks for films, saying they were for "some dodgy sci-fi B movie stuff, where they've asked us to drop in words like 'Venus' and 'Jupiter' here and there."

Music for the Masses was released on 28 September 1987 by Mute Records in the United Kingdom, Sire Records in the United States, and Intercord Records in West Germany. In the UK, the album was assigned catalogue number STUMM47, and in West Germany, INT 146.833. Initial pressings of the German album were on blue vinyl, and to combat the public's interest in importing that version, Mute Records released early pressings of the UK album on transparent vinyl. HMV stores made a promotional 12-inch vinyl available at the time of the album's release, which contained remixes of both "Strangelove" and "Never Let Me Down Again", although the latter's mix on the single was mis-labeled. The United States Department of Defense issued a special 4-track promotional vinyl release for overseas disc jockeys of its Armed Forces Radio and Television Service to play for service members, with its A-side containing tracks from the American heavy metal band W.A.S.P. According to Burmeister and Lange, only a single copy of this release was known to exist as of 2017, as the military were advised to return copies after use.

The album sold over 700,000 copies within six months of its release, and was certified Platinum by the Recording Industry Association of America (RIAA) in the US in February 1991. Since its release in 1987 through 2023, it has been estimated that globally, Music for the Masses sold over 5.5 million copies, making it the second best-selling Depeche Mode album to date.

=== Singles ===
"Strangelove", the album's lead single, was released on 27 April 1987. The band appeared on the BBC's Top of the Pops on 7 May 1987 to promote the song. Instrumental "Pimpf" was the single's B-side.

Their second single, "Never Let Me Down Again", was released on 24 August 1987, with "Pleasure, Little Treasure" as its B-side. The album's third single, "Behind the Wheel", was released on 28 December 1987, and on 7 January 1988, Depeche Mode appeared on the Top of the Pops again to perform the song. The B-side, "Route 66", was included because Gore "thought it would be a good idea to record a driving song" on the release.

"Little 15" was released as the fourth and final official single in May 1988 (Note: Sources differ on the release date for "Little 15"; Burmeister and Lange give this as 18 May 1988, while depechemode.com gives the date as 16 May 1988.) in limited territories. The single had two B-sides, the instrumental "Stjarna" (Swedish for "star") and Wilder's performance of the "Moonlight Sonata" by Ludwig van Beethoven. Wilder performed the piano on both B-sides.

On 23 August 1988, Sire Records released the US-only "Strangelove '88" due to the strength of the US leg of their Music for the Masses Tour. Remixes of "Nothing" were included in the release, and some remixes were provided by the music producer Tim Simenon, who goes by the professional name Bomb the Bass. On 7 September 1988, the band appeared at the 1988 MTV Video Music Awards and performed "Strangelove". Wilder said the performance was done at the prompting of their US label and marketing team to help improve their exposure in the US. Also in 1988, the band released their video collection Strange, which included all of their music videos directed by Anton Corbijn to date.

Music for the Masses was remastered and released on a special two-disc version in 2006, with bonus tracks, a DVD documentary and a 5.1 audio mix of the original album.

=== Public image and working with Anton Corbijn ===
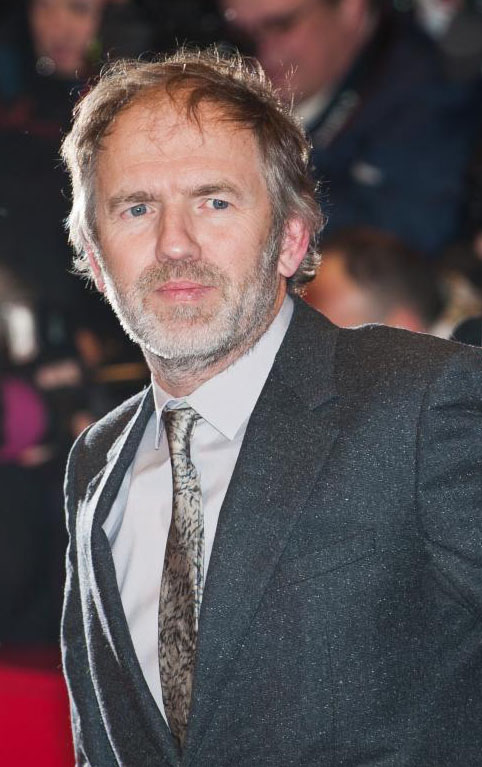
Anton Corbijn's involvement in videos and promotional materials for Music for the Masses helped redefine Depeche Mode's visual aesthetic

The band found that between this and their previous album Black Celebration, their reputation with the press as a teenybopper band had faded. Their image was improved by bringing in the Dutch artist Anton Corbijn to direct their music videos, with Gahan later saying that "I think Anton [Corbijn] saved us, visually", with Corbijn's use of grainy black and white video footage and, for the first time in the band's history, including women in their videos. Corbijn went on to direct the videos for Music for the Masses's first three singles, "Strangelove", "Never Let Me Down Again", and "Behind the Wheel". Corbijn himself originally wasn't sure about working with the band, as he only knew their early work and felt that electronic music was emotionless. And, he had first worked with the band for their video for "A Question of Time" (1986) the previous year, but hadn't heard from the band in the nine intervening months since making that video, leaving the director thinking the band weren't happy with his work. But the members of the band had enjoyed working with Corbijn, with Gore recalling that all the video and photo sessions they'd done with him had been fun, saying "take Anton [Corbijn] out of the equation, and it's a nightmare." Wilder appreciated that Corbijn was making their videos more about the members of the band themselves.

=== Tour ===
Depeche Mode in 1987 in a promotional image issued by Mute Records in support of Music for the Masses. From left to right: Martin Gore, Andy Fletcher, Alan Wilder, Dave Gahan

The Music for the Masses Tour was a seven-leg tour that ran from October 1987 through June 1988. The first leg through Europe started in Madrid and finished mid-November in Paris. On 1 December, the first of two North American legs commenced in San Francisco and culminated three weeks later in New York City. In January 1988, the group played an eleven-date UK tour, which was followed by the second European leg beginning in Hamburg, West Germany in early February; the leg wrapped up in Vienna in late March. The press in Germany challenged the band on their Nazi-like stage dressing, with red and black flags and lyrics which sounded militaristic, to which Gore responded, "We're not political, we just like strong imagery. The flags are part of our aesthetic, not a political statement." Gahan agreed, saying, "We're not interested in politics. We sing about emotions, relationships, and personal experiences. If someone sees something political in that, it's their interpretation." The fifth leg through Eastern Europe ran for a few weeks in March before the band played four dates for the leg in Japan. This was followed later in the month by the start of the second North American leg, which began at Shoreline Amphitheatre in the San Francisco Bay Area. The US shows had mostly strong fan support, with exceptions such as Philadelphia, Atlanta and Nashville, where they did not sell out. The entire tour concluded mid-June with a concert at the Rose Bowl in Pasadena, California, where the band performed in front of a sold-out crowd of nearly 80,000 people, released as the live album 101 in 1988. Nitzer Ebb was scheduled to be the opening act for the tour on the North American leg, but immigration issues prevented the band from joining; Nitzer Ebb would join Depeche Mode in America two years later for the World Violation Tour.

==== Performing behind the Iron Curtain ====
In July 1985, the band had played two shows behind the Iron Curtain, one in Budapest, Hungary, and one in Warsaw, Poland, as part of their Some Great Reward Tour. They had attempted to book dates in both Moscow, Russia and East Germany as well, but those plans fell through due to the difficult bureaucracy at the time. As part of the fifth leg of the Music for the Masses tour in March 1987, the band were finally able to play in East Berlin, in a show approved by both the Socialist Unity Party of Germany (SED) and the Free German Youth (FDJ) parties. Originally, the FDJ wanted Depeche Mode to tour nationwide, and also to record and broadcast their entire concert, but the band refused both requests. Although the band wanted tickets to the concert to be made available to the public, that was not done and tickets were instead given to families of government officials. Depeche Mode played a single show on 7 March 1988 at the Werner-Seelenbinder-Halle to a crowd of about 6,000 people. Wilder later recalled that the crowd responded really well to their show, saying, "I can't remember how good or bad we were, but I have really good memories of the fans' reactions." Fletcher said, "We later found out that they'd presented us as the main attraction at a party for their youth organization to score points with young kids. We found out that normal fans didn't have a chance to get tickets. We knew nothing of this at the time, we were just totally ecstatic to be allowed to play in East Berlin. Seen from today's point of view [in 2009], we shouldn't have done the concert. We let ourselves be used by the Party."

==== Drug use ====
There was increased drug and alcohol use on this tour compared to previous Depeche Mode tours where the band had mostly stuck to marijuana and alcohol; for this tour they began using cocaine as well. Gahan in particular, who had been relatively sober on previous tours, experienced difficulties managing his increasing fame and visibility, coupled with an uptake in recreational drug use. This marked the start of a journey into hard drugs for Gahan, whose addiction to heroin, and a suicide attempt, nearly led to the break-up of the band in the 1990s.

== Critical reception ==
=== Contemporary reviews ===
Professional ratings
Review scores
Source	Rating
Q	3/5 stars
Record Mirror	4/5
Sounds	4/5 stars
The Village Voice	B+

Upon its release, Music for the Masses received a mix of praise and reservation from critics. AllMusic's Ned Raggett later summarized the initial reception as recognizing the album's "arena-sized" ambition, noting that it "feels huge throughout, like they taped Depeche recording at the world's largest arena show instead of in a studio", and praised the band's "musical and lyrical intimacy".

Q's Dave Rimmer thought it contained "plenty of good moments and much strident romance but nothing at the core to cling on to", saying that "this is the sort of record it's difficult to know when or where or in what mood to play". Music journalist Robert Christgau complimented the abnormal road symbolism of the lyrics, particularly on "Little 15", and believed that apart from the sadomasochistic metaphors, Depeche Mode succeeded in turning "adolescent Weltschmerz into something catchy, sexy and seemingly significant." NME critic Jane Solanas felt Gore was "at his obsessive best" on Music for the Masses and specifically highlighted "Never Let Me Down Again", which she called "an intriguing masterpiece, combining homo-eroticism with drug euphoria." Eleanor Levy of Record Mirror credited the band for their ability "to make the cold warm and the electronic human" on an album centred on "dissatisfaction, paranoia and vulnerability". In a less enthusiastic review, Paul Mathur from Melody Maker was ambivalent towards Depeche Mode's more mature, minimalist aesthetic and said although they had departed from their simpler pop sound, the record was "seamless, fluid, and, once the lights are out, particularly dull."

In a contemporary interview for French press, Gore pushed back against the interviewer who felt that Depeche Mode's songs were depressing. Gore said "other peoples' songs are falsely happy. ... Because our songs aren't like that, we're labeled 'pessimistic'. ... We're more realistic than pessimistic." In a separate interview with Sounds magazine, Gore elaborated, saying "many Depeche [Mode] songs deal with communication problems. There are a lot of recurring themes in my songs. One thing that always reappears is disillusionment and lack of contentment. A lot of the songs also deal with a search for innocence." Gore said although some songs he wrote have been autobiographical, he "also [imagines] situations [to write about]. I try to write things people can relate to. ... I write about love, pain, hope. Things everyone feels."

=== Retrospective reviews ===
Professional ratings
Review scores
Source	Rating
AllMusic	4.5/5 stars
Blender	4/5 stars
Mojo	5/5 stars
Pitchfork	8.0/10
Rolling Stone	4/5 stars
The Rolling Stone Album Guide	4.5/5 stars

In a retrospective review for Q, Dave Henderson found the narratives on Music for the Masses to be among Depeche Mode's most uncertain and contemplative, and that most of its songs were "real diamonds in the darkness ... this was the point at which Depeche Mode were first taken seriously." Sal Cinquemani of Slant Magazine described it as "steeped in high drama, each track spilling into the next like a pop-rock opera", saying that it showed the gloomier side of the "post-punk synth-pop" scene during the 1980s and was a success with both critics and consumers. Cinquemani's review claimed that the lyrical themes explored on the album include repentance and redemption. Alternative Press called the record "articulate, intricate electronic music that lacked the tinny feel of DM's early synth pop". Dennis Lim of Blender wrote that Music for the Masses "isn't just huge but unrelenting, muscled up with industrial guitar, Goth grit and arena ambition", while in Mojo, Danny Eccleston described it as "their first rock'n'roll album, in a way", observing "more focus, starker riffs, a bigger canvas, and plenty of songs that would have worked in any sonic context." Several retrospective assessments of the album say that themes of religion, sex, vulnerability and relationships are prevalent in the songs of Music for the Masses.

Music for the Masses was listed by Slant Magazine at number 75 on their list of "The 100 Best Albums of the 1980s". It was included in the book 1001 Albums You Must Hear Before You Die (2006).

== Subsequent events ==
While on tour, Gahan's wife gave birth to their first child, a son. In January 1988, Wilder released his Recoil side project's second album, Hydrology (1988). After the tour completed in June 1988, Gore went into the studio alone to record his first solo album. The band worked together to produce their live album 101, which was released in March 1989, and Gore's solo effort, Counterfeit EP, was released in June 1989. The band took a break until they reconvened in Milan, Italy in the middle of 1989 to start work on their follow-up album, Violator (1990).

== Legacy ==
Music for the Masses is widely regarded as the album that propelled Depeche Mode into mainstream success in the United States. Its accompanying tour culminated in a sold-out performance at the Rose Bowl in Pasadena, California, attended by over 70,000 fans, a moment immortalized in the documentary and live album 101 (1989), which itself both eclipsed and augmented Music for the Masses' popularity. According to Classic Pop magazine, the album elevated the band from an "oddball underdogs" status in the US to the commercial mainstream, commanding stadium-scale appeal.

The album marked a turning point in the band's sound, blending darkly sexual themes with expansive production. Classic Pop wrote that it was "an adventurous, hedonistic drive into uncharted territory" that fused experimentalism with pop sensibility. Critics have noted its influence on the evolution of electronic rock: Ned Raggett of The Quietus argued that while the album is sometimes overshadowed by Black Celebration (1986) and Violator (1990), it remains "underrated" and contains "two of [Depeche Mode's] most defining songs" – "Never Let Me Down Again" and "Behind the Wheel". The album also marked a shift in visual identity, with Anton Corbijn's involvement in music videos, album covers and promotional materials helping to redefine the band's aesthetic.

The title and songs inspired the tribute album For the Masses (1998), which included covers by artists including the Cure, Rammstein and the Smashing Pumpkins. For the Masses charted in both the US and Germany.

== Track listing ==
All tracks are written by Martin L. Gore. All lead vocals by Dave Gahan, except where noted.

Side one
No.	Title	Lead vocals	Length
1.	"Never Let Me Down Again"		4:47
2.	"The Things You Said"	Gore	4:02
3.	"Strangelove"		4:56
4.	"Sacred"		4:47
5.	"Little 15"		4:18

Side two
No.	Title	Lead vocals	Length
6.	"Behind the Wheel"	Gahan; Gore	5:18
7.	"I Want You Now"	Gore	3:44
8.	"To Have and to Hold"		2:51
9.	"Nothing"		4:18
10.	"Pimpf" (includes hidden track "Interlude #1 (Mission Impossible)")	instrumental; vocalisation by Gore	4:55
Total length:			44:06

Bonus tracks on 1987 CD and cassette releases (Note: On some copies of the cassette the album is presented on side 1 with the four bonus tracks at the start of side 2.)
No.	Title	Length
11.	"Agent Orange" ( (Note: On the CD, there is a 30-second pause between "Interlude #1" and "Agent Orange", programmed as a pregap))	5:05
12.	"Never Let Me Down Again" (Aggro Mix)	4:55
13.	"To Have and to Hold" (Spanish Taster)	2:34
14.	"Pleasure, Little Treasure" (Glitter Mix)	5:36
Total length:		57:24

=== 2006 Collectors Edition CD + DVD ===
- Disc one is a hybrid SACD/CD with a multi-channel SACD layer.
- Disc two is a DVD containing Music for the Masses in DTS 5.1, Dolby Digital 5.1 and PCM Stereo plus bonus material

Disc one (CD)
No.	Title	Length
1.	"Never Let Me Down Again"	4:47
2.	"The Things You Said"	3:55
3.	"Strangelove"	4:38
4.	"Sacred"	5:01
5.	"Little 15"	4:14
6.	"Behind the Wheel"	5:17
7.	"I Want You Now"	3:28
8.	"To Have and to Hold"	3:08
9.	"Nothing"	4:12
10.	"Pimpf" (includes hidden track "Interlude #1 (Mission Impossible)")	4:55

Disc two (DVD): DTS 5.1, Dolby Digital 5.1 and PCM Stereo
No.	Title	Length
1.	"Depeche Mode: 1987–88 (Sometimes You Do Need Some New Jokes)" (a short film)	37:02
2.	"Never Let Me Down Again"	4:47
3.	"The Things You Said"	3:55
4.	"Strangelove"	4:38
5.	"Sacred"	5:01
6.	"Little 15"	4:14
7.	"Behind the Wheel"	5:17
8.	"I Want You Now"	3:28
9.	"To Have and to Hold"	3:08
10.	"Nothing"	4:12
11.	"Pimpf" (includes hidden track "Interlude #1 (Mission Impossible)")	4:55

Disc 2 (DVD) additional tracks: DTS 5.1, Dolby Digital 5.1 and PCM Stereo
No.	Title	Length
12.	"Agent Orange"	5:31
13.	"Never Let Me Down Again" (Aggro Mix)	4:58
14.	"To Have and to Hold" (Spanish Taster)	2:36
15.	"Pleasure, Little Treasure" (Glitter Mix)	5:38

Disc 2 (DVD) additional tracks: PCM Stereo
No.	Title	Writer(s)	Length
16.	"Agent Orange"		5:05
17.	"Pleasure, Little Treasure"		2:53
18.	"Route 66"	Bobby Troup	4:11
19.	"Stjarna"		4:25
20.	"Sonata No.14 in C#m (Moonlight Sonata)"	Ludwig van Beethoven	5:36

== Personnel ==
Credits adapted from the liner notes of Music for the Masses.

=== Depeche Mode ===
- Andrew Fletcher
- Martin Gore
- Alan Wilder
- David Gahan

=== Technical ===
- Depeche Mode – production
- David Bascombe – production, engineering
- Daniel Miller – additional production, help

=== Artwork ===
- Martyn Atkins – design, photography
- David Jones – design, photography
- Mark Higenbottam – design, photography

== Charts ==
=== Weekly charts ===
1987–1988 weekly chart performance for Music for the Masses
Chart (1987–1988)	Peak position
Australian Albums (Kent Music Report)	60
Austrian Albums (Ö3 Austria)	16
Canada Top Albums/CDs (RPM)	26
Dutch Albums (Album Top 100)	52
European Albums (Music & Media)	8
Finnish Albums (Suomen virallinen lista)	7
French Albums (IFOP)	7
German Albums (Offizielle Top 100)	2
Italian Albums (Musica e dischi)	7
Spanish Albums (AFYVE)	26
Swedish Albums (Sverigetopplistan)	4
Swiss Albums (Schweizer Hitparade)	4
UK Albums (Official Charts)	10
UK Independent Albums (MRIB)	2
US Billboard 200	35

2013 weekly chart performance for Music for the Masses
Chart (2013)	Peak position
Hungarian Albums (MAHASZ)	36

2017 weekly chart performance for Music for the Masses
Chart (2017)	Peak position
Polish Albums (ZPAV)	44

=== Year-end charts ===
1987 year-end chart performance for Music for the Masses
Chart (1987)	Position
European Albums (Music & Media)	79
German Albums (Offizielle Top 100)	73

1988 year-end chart performance for Music for the Masses
Chart (1988)	Position
European Albums (Music & Media)	76
US Billboard 200	90

== Certifications ==
Certifications for Music for the Masses
Region	Certification	Certified units/sales
France (SNEP)	Platinum	300,000^{*}
Germany (BVMI)	Gold	250,000^{^}
Sweden (GLF)	Gold	50,000^{^}
Switzerland (IFPI Switzerland)	Gold	25,000^{^}
United Kingdom (BPI)	Silver	60,000^{^}
United States (RIAA)	Platinum	1,000,000^{^}
^{*} Sales figures based on certification alone.^{^} Shipments figures based on certification alone.
