= Never Let Me Down Again =

Single by Depeche Mode

from the album Music for the Masses
- B-side: "Pleasure, Little Treasure"; "To Have and to Hold (Spanish Taster)"
- Released: 24 August 1987
- Recorded: 1986–1987
- Studio: Guillaume Tell (Paris); Konk (London); Puk (Gjerlev, Denmark)
- Genre: Synth-pop; dance-rock; EBM
- Length: 4:47 (album version); 4:20 (radio edit)
- Label: Mute
- Songwriter: Martin Gore
- Producers: David Bascombe; Depeche Mode

Depeche Mode singles chronology
"Strangelove" (1987)	"Never Let Me Down Again" (1987)	"Behind the Wheel" (1987)

Music video
- "Never Let Me Down Again" on YouTube

"Never Let Me Down Again" is a song by the English electronic band Depeche Mode. It was released as the second single from their sixth studio album, Music for the Masses (1987), on 24 August 1987. Written by Martin Gore, arranged by Alan Wilder and produced by Depeche Mode and David Bascombe, it was recorded between sessions in Paris and London and mixed in Denmark.

The song, which lyrically describes the narrator fleeing from addiction, incorporates samples from "When the Levee Breaks" by Led Zeppelin and Carl Orff's Carmina Burana, and features a strong guitar riff, which was unusual for the band up to that point.

Although not a major chart success at the time of its release, it became a live concert standard for the band, and has featured on the soundtracks of television shows including The Last of Us and Euphoria. It has been covered by numerous artists, including The Smashing Pumpkins, a recording of whose was included on the tribute album For the Masses (1998).

== Background ==
Depeche Mode had released their album Black Celebration in early 1986, followed up with a supporting tour which lasted through the middle of that year. Shortly after the tour completed, Depeche Mode's songwriter, Martin Gore, prepared demos of songs he thought would be appropriate for their new album at his home studio in London, and among them was a demo of the song that would become "Never Let Me Down Again". Although Gore wrote the demos for the album's songs, it was left to band member and music producer Alan Wilder to arrange, produce and record the songs into the final versions of the songs that would appear on the album.

== Recording ==
"Never Let Me Down Again" was recorded between recording sessions in late 1986 at Studio Guillaume Tell in Paris and Konk Studios in London. Daniel Miller, citing growing tension in the studio during the recording of Black Celebration, had stepped away from producing Depeche Mode's music for the new songs, and instead they worked with David Bascombe, who had just completed working as a recording engineer with Tears for Fears on their album Songs from the Big Chair (1985).

Wilder and the other members of the band considered the track an "obvious single" with much potential, with Gore calling it a "stand-out" track. Although primarily known as an all-synth band, the song included a strong guitar riff, albeit "heavily treated and processed", played by Gore, as they had done as far back as 1982 when recording their single "Get the Balance Right!". To make the song sound more dramatic, they mixed the Led Zeppelin-influenced drum patterns and Martin Gore's guitar riffs forward in the mix. Gore's guitar work in the song was described in 2025 as "simple, repetitive riffs [that] just sit on a groove, adding another textural element and human grit into the mix." Bascombe noted that both he and the band had brought a "library" of samples to the sessions, which they used for the song. The Snare drum in the song was sampled from "When the Levee Breaks" by Led Zeppelin, augmented in the studio because the original audio was too low-fidelity to use alone. The tom-tom drum sound was a sample the band re-used from their earlier single, "Stripped" (1986). A sample from Carl Orff's Carmina Burana was also incorporated into the track. Gore's guitar part for the song, which was filtered through an ARP 2600 synthesiser, was recorded at Puk Recording Studios in Gjerlev, Denmark.

The guitar intro of the song on the album was not originally intended, according to producer Bascombe, who said that "the sequencers we were using in those days, that guitar was sampled and it just ran on the count-in over the start of the track but it wasn't supposed to be. We all went, 'That's great' and so that was a happy accident."

During recording, Wilder and Bascombe disagreed on how to edit the mix for the single version. Wilder wanted to remove certain parts for the single mix, such as the piano bridge between the verse and chorus, but Bascombe overruled him. Years later, Bascombe admitted that Wilder had probably been right.

The coda of "Never Let Me Down Again" references the Soft Cell song "Torch".

Final mixing of the track took place at Puk Recording Studios in Denmark. The main remix version of the track, known as the "Split Mix", was created with direct involvement of the band. Years later, after remixes began being made by various hired producers, Wilder suggested that the band should have kept making their own mixes instead of farming them out to others.

== Lyrics ==
The lyrics of the song, starting with the strident vocals of "I'm taking a ride with my best friend", are generally regarded as reflecting drug use, with the track being labelled by NME music journalist Jane Solanas as a track that conveys the feeling of "drug euphoria".

In a 1987 interview, Gore said that the song "has nothing to do with relationships. It's about the concept of fleeing from reality and the evil awakening afterwards. Any kind of fleeing. Drugs, alcohol, or whatever."

== Release ==
"Never Let Me Down Again" was released as a single on 24 August 1987. In the UK, Mute Records released the single on 7", 12", and limited 12" vinyl with catalogue numbers 7BONG14, 12BONG14 and L12BONG14, respectively. A 12" promotional vinyl release, P12BONG14, was made available as well. In West Germany, Intercord Records released the same 3 single formats as well with catalogue numbers INT 111.850, INT 126.868 and INT 126.869. Remixes of the b-side, "Pleasure, Little Treasure", were made by John Fryer and Paul Kendall, which was described in a Smash Hits review as "quite a good disco belter".

=== Music video ===
The music video, directed by Anton Corbijn, appears on Strange (1987), The Videos 86>98 (1998), the DVD of The Best of Depeche Mode Volume 1 (2006) and on Video Singles Collection (2016).

== Critical reception ==
=== Contemporary reviews ===
Smash Hits reviewed the song positively, calling the single "more memorable" than their other singles, calling the song "creepy ... shake in your sandals eerie." An interview in Sounds magazine expected the single to be a hit, even in the UK where their singles tended to top out in the teens; they overestimated; "Never Let Me Down Again" stalled at number 22. Melody Maker was similarly positive, saying the song "might yet prove to be the most durable of their singles". In a review in NME, they called the song "an intriguing masterpiece". After the single stalled on the charts in the UK, Eleanor Levy of Record Mirror magazine said "this dark, sensual track is probably far too disturbing for the Rick Astley fans among us," and, collectively among the entire album, "Depeche Mode still manage to make the cold warm and the electronic human." Two years later, in reviewing their live album 101, she said that the "disturbingly erotic" song "sits like a dark shroud around the group's traditional fluffy pop framework."

=== Retrospective reviews ===
In 2017, Billboard magazine included "Never Let Me Down Again" on their list of Top 20 Depeche Mode songs, coming in at number 12.

== Live performances ==
The song became permanent part of the band's live act. Notable in the 101 video is when Dave Gahan waves his arms in the air toward the end of the song, and the sold-out crowd at the Rose Bowl mimics Gahan's movements, which the German magazine Music Express called a "wind in a cornfield" simulation.

Live versions of "Never Let Me Down Again" have been released on 101 (1989), Devotional (video) (1993), One Night in Paris (2002), Touring the Angel: Live in Milan (2006), Tour of the Universe: Barcelona 20/21.11.09 (2010), Live in Berlin (Depeche Mode album and video) (2014), and Spirits in the Forest (2019).

== Notable cover versions ==
The Smashing Pumpkins recorded a cover of the song and released it as a B-side on their 1994 CD single "Rocket" as well as on the Depeche Mode tribute album For the Masses (1998). Discussing the cover, Martin Gore said he had "always liked" the Pumpkins cover, while Dave Gahan said he "particularly liked it", and even thought it was "a lot better" than the Depeche Mode original.

== In popular culture ==
The song was featured in the HBO series Euphoria. It played during the third episode of the second season, "Ruminations: Big and Little Bullys".

"Never Let Me Down Again" appeared two times on the TV show The Last of Us, first appearing in the series premiere, "When You're Lost in the Darkness". Craig Mazin, the co-creator of the series, chose the song due to its blend of upbeat sounds and dark lyrics. He felt its title referred to the relationship between Joel and Ellie, and noted it would recur later in the season in a different manner. In the wake of the song being featured on The Last of Us, the amount of streams of "Never Let Me Down Again" tripled overnight. The song returned in the sixth episode of the first season, "Kin", where it is performed by Mazin's daughter Jessica, to demonstrate Ellie feeling let down by Joel.

== Track listings ==
All songs written by Martin Gore.

7-inch: Mute / 7BONG14 (UK)

1. "Never Let Me Down Again" – 4:20
2. "Pleasure, Little Treasure" – 2:52

12-inch: Mute / 12BONG14 (UK)

1. "Never Let Me Down Again (Split Mix)" – 9:34
2. "Pleasure, Little Treasure (Glitter Mix)" – 5:34
3. "Never Let Me Down Again (Aggro Mix)" – 4:53

12-inch: Mute / L12BONG14 (UK)

1. "Never Let Me Down Again (Tsangarides Mix)" – 4:22 (Remixed by Chris Tsangarides)
2. "Pleasure, Little Treasure (Join Mix)" – 4:53 (Remixed by John Fryer & Paul Kendall)
3. "To Have and to Hold (Spanish Taster)" – 2:33

Cassette: Mute / CBONG14 (UK)

1. "Never Let Me Down Again (Split Mix)" – 9:34
2. "Pleasure, Little Treasure (Glitter Mix)" – 5:34
3. "Never Let Me Down Again (Aggro Mix)" – 4:53

CD: Mute / CDBONG14 (UK)

1. "Never Let Me Down Again (Split Mix)" – 9:34
2. "Pleasure, Little Treasure (Join Mix)" – 4:53
3. "To Have and to Hold (Spanish Taster)" – 2:33
4. "Never Let Me Down Again (Aggro Mix)" – 4:53
- Originally released in Cardsleeve [1987]
- Rereleased as 4track CD single in Slim Jewel Case in 1991.

CD: Mute / CDBONG14 (UK)

1. "Never Let Me Down Again" – 4:20
2. "Pleasure, Little Treasure" – 2:52
3. "Never Let Me Down Again (Split Mix)" – 9:34
4. "Pleasure, Little Treasure (Glitter Mix)" – 5:34
5. "Never Let Me Down Again (Aggro Mix)" – 4:53
6. "Never Let Me Down Again (Tsangarides Mix)" – 4:22
7. "Pleasure, Little Treasure (Join Mix)" – 4:53
8. "To Have and To Hold (Spanish Taster)" – 2:33
- The second CD is the 1992 re-release.

== Charts ==
=== Weekly charts ===
Weekly chart performance for "Never Let Me Down Again"
Chart (1987–1988)	Peak position
Australia (Kent Music Report)	82
Austria (Ö3 Austria Top 40)	29
Denmark (Tracklisten)	1
Europe (European Hot 100 Singles)	15
Finland (Suomen virallinen lista)	5
France (SNEP)	29
Ireland (IRMA)	12
Italy (Musica e dischi)	19
Italy Airplay (Music & Media)	12
Netherlands (Single Top 100)	80
South Africa (Springbok Radio)	15
Spain (AFYVE)	5
Sweden (Sverigetopplistan)	7
Switzerland (Schweizer Hitparade)	7
UK Singles (OCC)	22
UK Indie (MRIB)	2
US Billboard Hot 100	63
US Dance Club Songs (Billboard) with "Pleasure, Little Treasure"	12
US Dance Singles Sales (Billboard) with "Pleasure, Little Treasure"	29
US Cash Box Top 100	75
West Germany (GfK)	2

=== Year-end charts ===
Year-end chart performance for "Never Let Me Down Again"
Chart (1987)	Position
Europe (European Hot 100 Singles)	74
West Germany (Media Control)	53

== Certifications ==
Region	Certification	Certified units/sales
United States (RIAA)	Gold	500,000^{‡}
^{‡} Sales+streaming figures based on certification alone.

== See also ==
- 1987 in music
- Depeche Mode discography
- Songs about recreational drug use
