= Strange (video) =

Video by Depeche Mode
- Released: 12 July 1988
- Recorded: 1986–1988
- Length: 30 minutes
- Label: Mute; Sire; Reprise
- Director: Anton Corbijn
- Producer: Richard Bell

Depeche Mode chronology
Some Great Videos (1985)	Strange (1988)	101 (1989)

Professional ratings
Review scores
Source	Rating
AllMusic	2/5 stars

Strange – A Black and White Mode by Anton Corbijn is the second music video compilation by the English electronic music band Depeche Mode, featuring the first five Depeche Mode videos directed by Anton Corbijn, released in 1988.

== Background ==
Depeche Mode had released their album Music for the Masses in September 1987. The Dutch director Anton Corbijn had first shot a video for the band in 1986 for their single "A Question of Time", and shot most of the band's videos since then, the sole exception through 1988 being the video shot for the band's single "Little 15", which was shot by Martyn Atkins.

== Videos ==
Corbijn shot the entire video album in Super 8. The five videos are mostly in black and white, except for some random megaphones that were colored red. The compilation includes the three main singles for Music for the Masses, the final Black Celebration single "A Question of Time", and "Pimpf", the instrumental closer to Music for the Masses. The "Pimpf" video was exclusive to this release until its inclusion on Video Singles Collection in 2016.

== Release ==
Strange was released in 1988 by Mute Records in the UK on VHS. In the UK, a limited edition of the release included signed photos of the band.

Both Strange and its follow-up Strange Too were re-released on DVD and Blu-ray on 8 December 2023.

== Track listing ==
1. "A Question of Time" (remix)
2. "Strangelove" (7" version)
3. "Never Let Me Down Again" (Split mix), longer than the video on The Videos 86>98
4. "Behind the Wheel" (album version), longer than the video on The Videos 86>98
5. "Pimpf"
- All tracks are written by Martin Gore
- All videos are directed by Anton Corbijn

== Certifications and sales ==
Certifications and sales for Strange
Region	Certification	Certified units/sales
United States (RIAA)	Gold	50,000^{^}
^{^} Shipments figures based on certification alone.
