= David Bascombe =

British record producer and musician (born 1959)

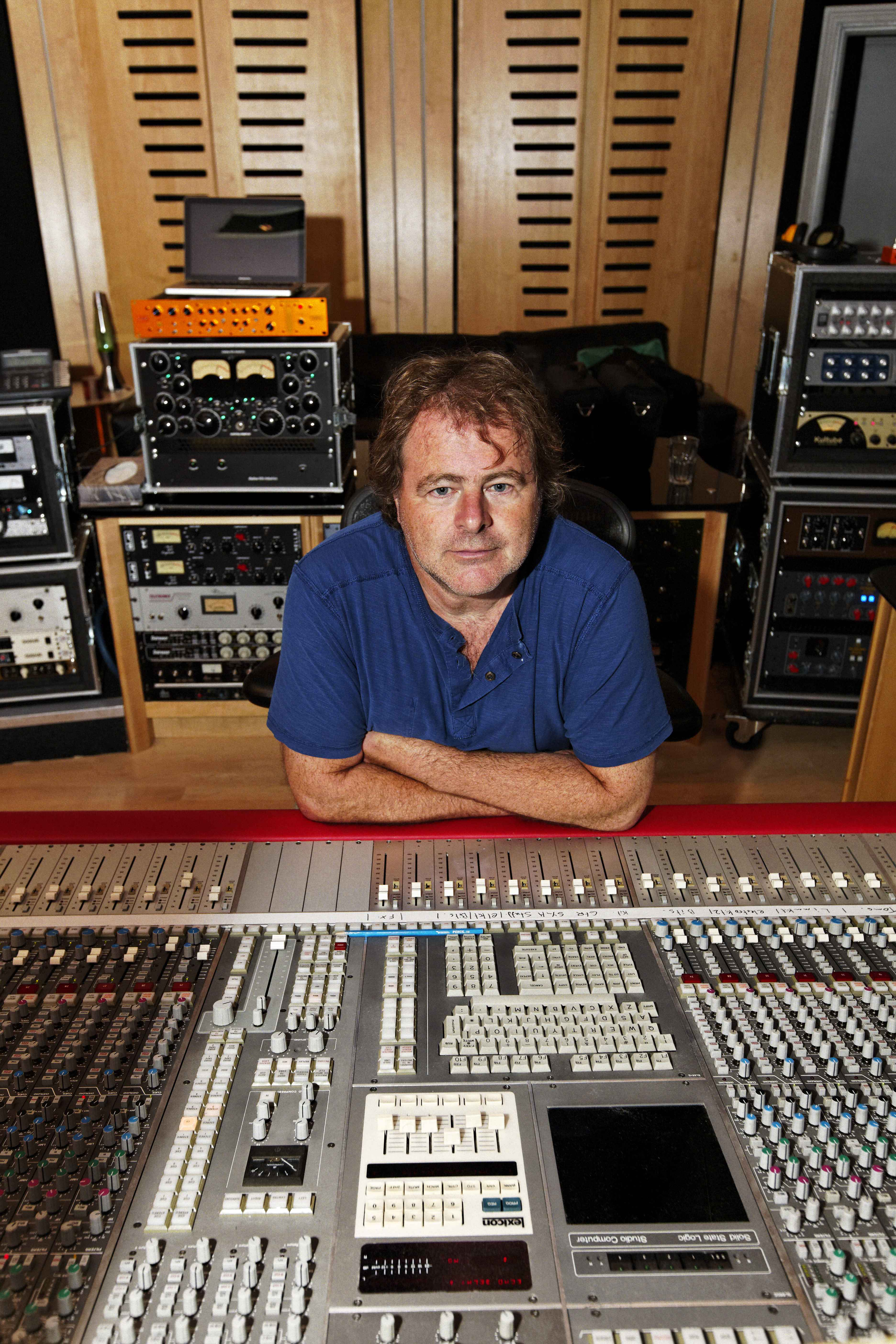
- David Bascombe behind a mixing desk

Background information
- Also known as: Dave Bascombe
- Born: David Bascombe; July 23, 1959 (age 67); Heswall, Cheshire, United Kingdom
- Occupations: Record producer; mixer; engineer
- Website: www.echobeachmanagement.com/artist/dave-bascombe/

David 'Dave' Bascombe (born July 23, 1959) is a British record producer, audio engineer, and mixing engineer.

He has produced albums by artists including Tears for Fears, Depeche Mode, Oleta Adams, and ABC. Mixing credits include music by Bent, Goldfrapp, or The Human League.

Together with Tears for Fears, he was nominated for an the Grammy Award for Producer of the Year for the co-production of The Seeds of Love.

== Discography ==
=== Production credits ===
Production credits
Year	Album	Artist	Notes
1979	A Curious Feeling	Tony Banks	Engineer
1980	Duke	Genesis	Assistant Engineer as "Dave Bascombe"
1982	The Pursuit of Accidents	Level 42	Additional Engineer
1985	Songs from the Big Chair	Tears for Fears	Engineer as "Dave Bascombe"
1986	So	Peter Gabriel	Original Track Recording
1987	Music for the Masses	Depeche Mode	Producer, Engineer and Mixer
1989	The Seeds of Love	Tears for Fears	Producer, Engineer and Mixer as "Dave Bascombe"
1990	Circle of One	Oleta Adams	Producer as "Dave Bascombe"
1991	Abracadabra	ABC	Producer, Engineer and Mixer as "Dave Bascombe"
1994	The Sweetest Illusion	Basia	Mixer as "Dave Bascombe"
1995	Octopus	The Human League	Mixer as "Dave Bascombe"
1996	Coming Up	Suede	Mixer as "Dave Bascombe"
2003	Black Cherry	Goldfrapp	Mixer
2004	Ariels	Bent	Engineer and Mixer as "Dave Bascombe"
