= Puk Recording Studios =

Danish recording studio

- Industry: Recording studio
- Predecessor: CMC Records; EMI Records; Peter Klokker Fink Iversen
- Founded: Gjerlev, Denmark
- Founder: John "Puk" Quist; Birte Quist (born Sørensen)
- Headquarters: Gjerlev, Denmark
- Number of locations: 1
- Key people: Nete Ramlau-Hansen; Peter Klokker Fink Iversen; Mogens Balle
- Owner: Wind Estate

Puk Recording Studios, also known as Puk Studio or simply Puk, was a Danish recording studio located in Gjerlev, near Randers.

Since its establishment in the early 1980s, it was used by numerous international artists, including Judas Priest, George Michael, Depeche Mode, and Elton John, as well as many Danish acts such as TV-2, September, Kashmir, and Nephew. In addition to recording facilities, the studio also featured an on-site hotel with wellness amenities and a swimming pool.

== History ==
Puk Recording Studios was founded in the late 1970s by John "Puk" Quist and Birte Quist (born Sørensen) on a former farm estate that had previously functioned as a monastery near the town of Gjerlev. During the mid-1980s, the couple expanded the studio with support from audio engineering student Nete Ramlau-Hansen and local collaborators.

The studio was later incorporated as a joint-stock company, with John and Birte Quist remaining in charge until 1991. That year, due to financial difficulties, creditors placed the company under suspension of payments, eventually leading to bankruptcy proceedings. However, the studio never ceased operations and continued under new ownership.

In 1984, Peter Klokker Fink Iversen joined the studio as a sound engineer and was later promoted to technical director. He was responsible for the technical design and implementation of the two international-standard studios launched in 1985. Around the same time, Mogens Balle was hired as studio manager. Balle played a key role in promoting the studio internationally through media coverage and active outreach. Balle left the studio in 1988, and in 1991 Iversen took over daily operations.

== Notable clients (1978–1991) ==
During its peak years, Puk Recording Studios hosted a wide range of artists, including:

- Danish artists: Lasse & Mathilde, Susanne Lana, Laban, Bamses Venner, Bjarne Liller, Kliché, Østjysk Musikforsyning, Malurt, Anne Dorte Michelsen, Snapshot, Lars H.U.G., Michael Falch, Kim Larsen, Laid Back, Delta Cross Band, De Gyldne Løver, Per Højholt, TV-2, Anne Grete, One Two, Miss B. Haven, Gnags, 8000 C, Nanna, Skagerack, D-A-D, Pretty Maids, Mænd i Blåt, Sort Sol, Thomas Helmig, Love Shop.
- International artists: Trio (Germany), DéFilm, Jeanne Mas (France), Go West (UK), Danny Wilson (Scotland), George Michael (UK), Wet Wet Wet (Scotland), Depeche Mode (UK), The Kinks (UK), Judas Priest (UK), Elton John (UK), Showaddywaddy (UK), Gary Moore (Northern Ireland), Sisters of Mercy (UK), Zeno (D) among others.

== Later development and closure ==
In 1992, Iversen took over operations under a new corporate structure jointly owned with Replay Records and Pladecompagniet. In 1994, the company was acquired by CMC Records, based in Pandrup, with Iversen joining the company's management while remaining studio director.

In 1997, CMC and its assets, including Puk Recording Studios, were acquired by EMI Records, integrating the studio into the EMI Studio Group, which also operated Abbey Road Studios.

In 1999, Peter Klokker Fink Iversen repurchased the studio from EMI, becoming its sole owner. In later years, the studio hosted artists such as Volbeat and Meshuggah.

== Fire and final years ==
On 28 December 2020, the building that housed Puk Recording Studios was destroyed in a fire. The building was empty at the time. Prior to the incident, Iversen had sold the property to Wind Estate, a company that subsequently installed wind turbines on the adjacent land.
