= Gjerlev =

- Village
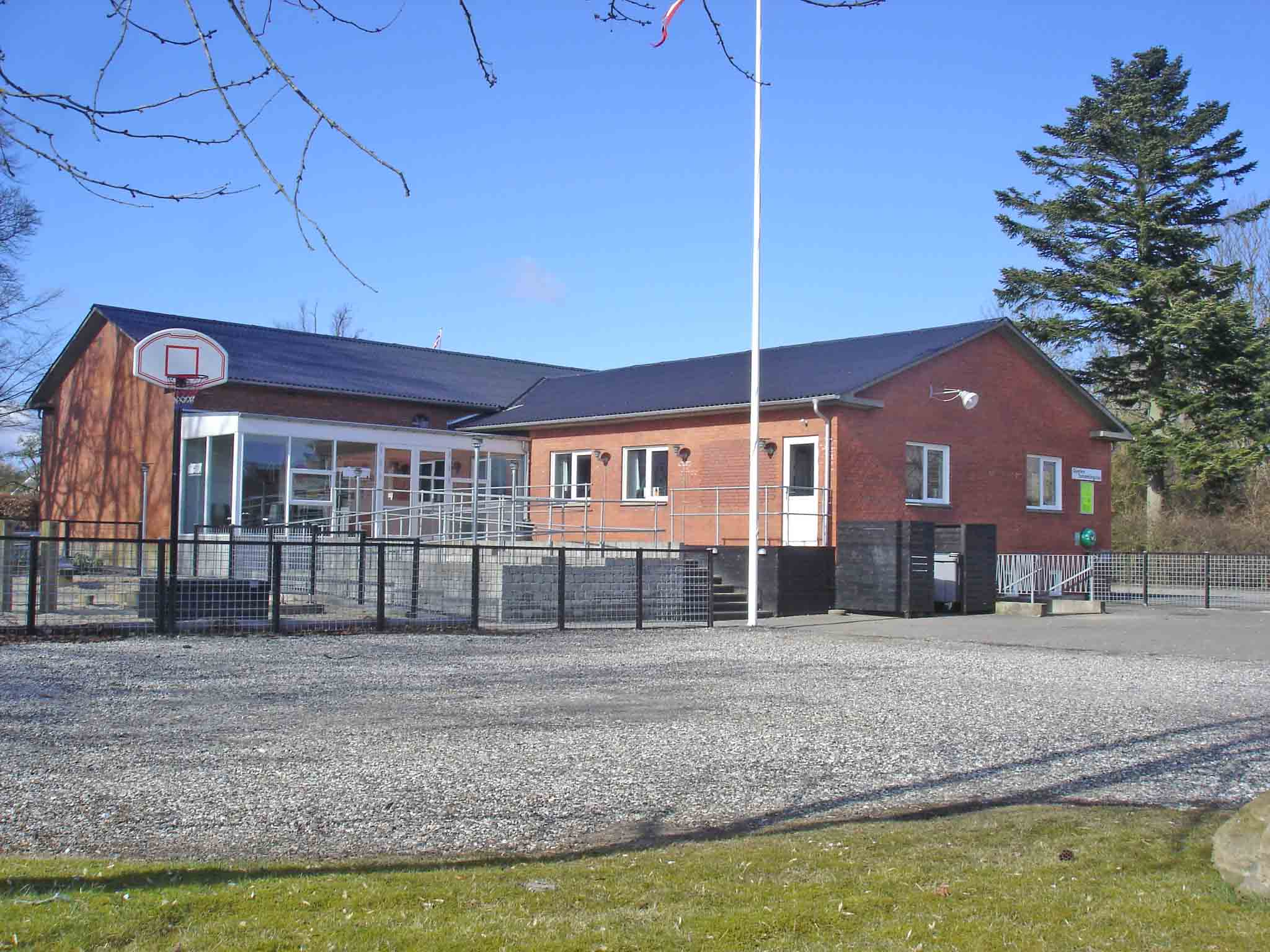
- The village hall in Gjerlev

- Location in Central Denmark Region Gjerlev (Denmark)
- Coordinates: 56°35′14″N 10°7′54″E
- Country: Denmark
- Region: Central Denmark (Midtjylland)
- Municipality: Randers Municipality

Population (2026)
  - Total: 640

Gjerlev is a village, with a population of 640 (1 January 2026), in Randers Municipality, Central Denmark Region in Denmark. It is located 16 km south of Hadsund and 17 km north of Randers.

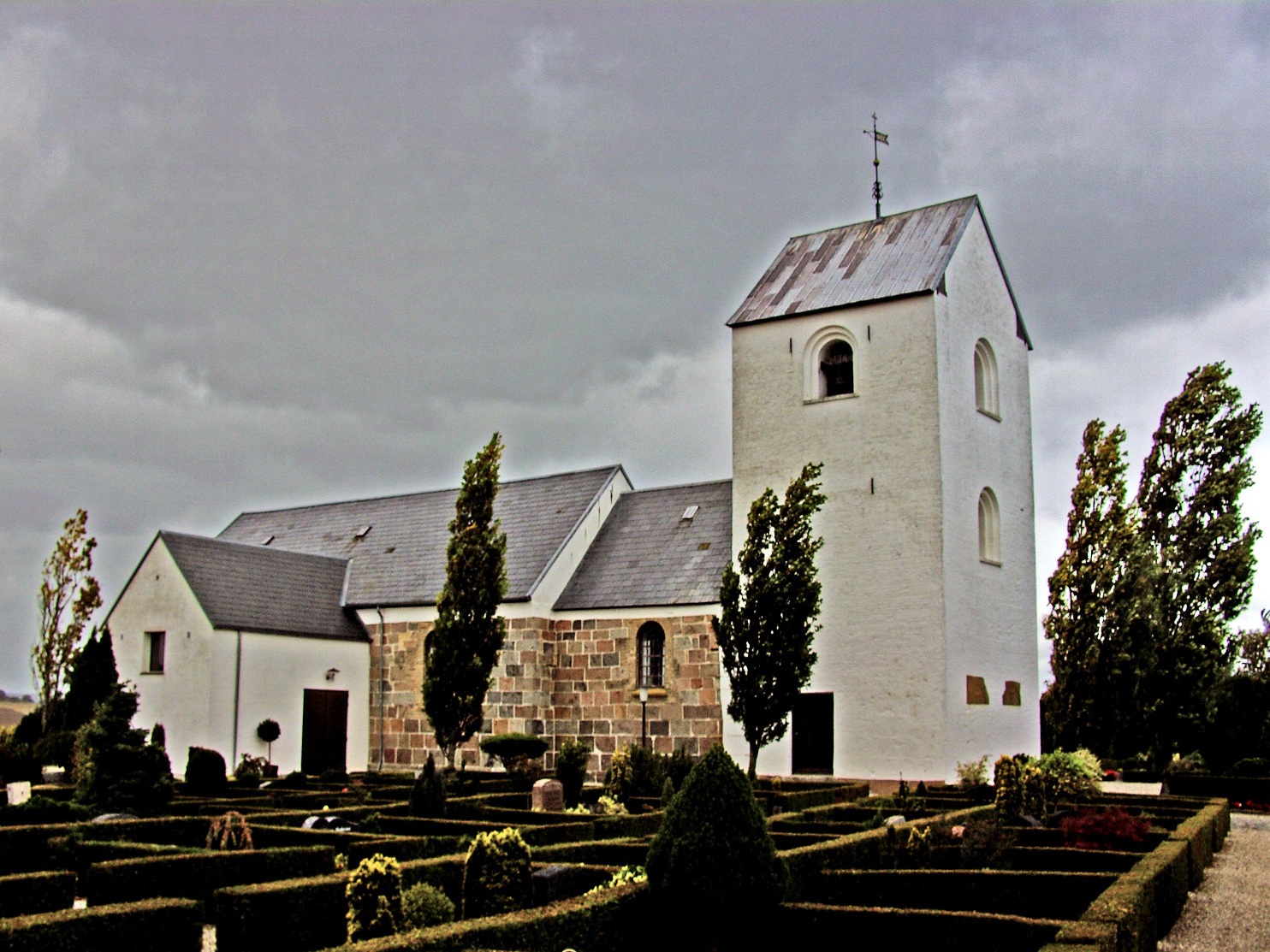
Gjerlev Church

Gjerlev Church is located in the village.

An old farmhouse at Kærby 4 km west of Gjerlev was the original location of the Puk Recording Studios until it was destroyed by a fire in 2020.
