= Konk (recording studio) =

Recording studio and label established and managed by members of the Kinks

Coordinates: 51.58535°N 0.11473°W

Konk Studios
- Founder: Ray Davies, Dave Davies, Mick Avory
- Headquarters: 84-86 Tottenham Lane, Hornsey, London, England
- Key people: Sarah Lockwood (manager, 1976–present); Matt Jaggar (engineer, 2016–present); George Chung (engineer, 2018–present)
- Website: www.konkstudios.com

Konk is the name of a recording studio established by members of English rock band the Kinks.

== Konk Studios ==
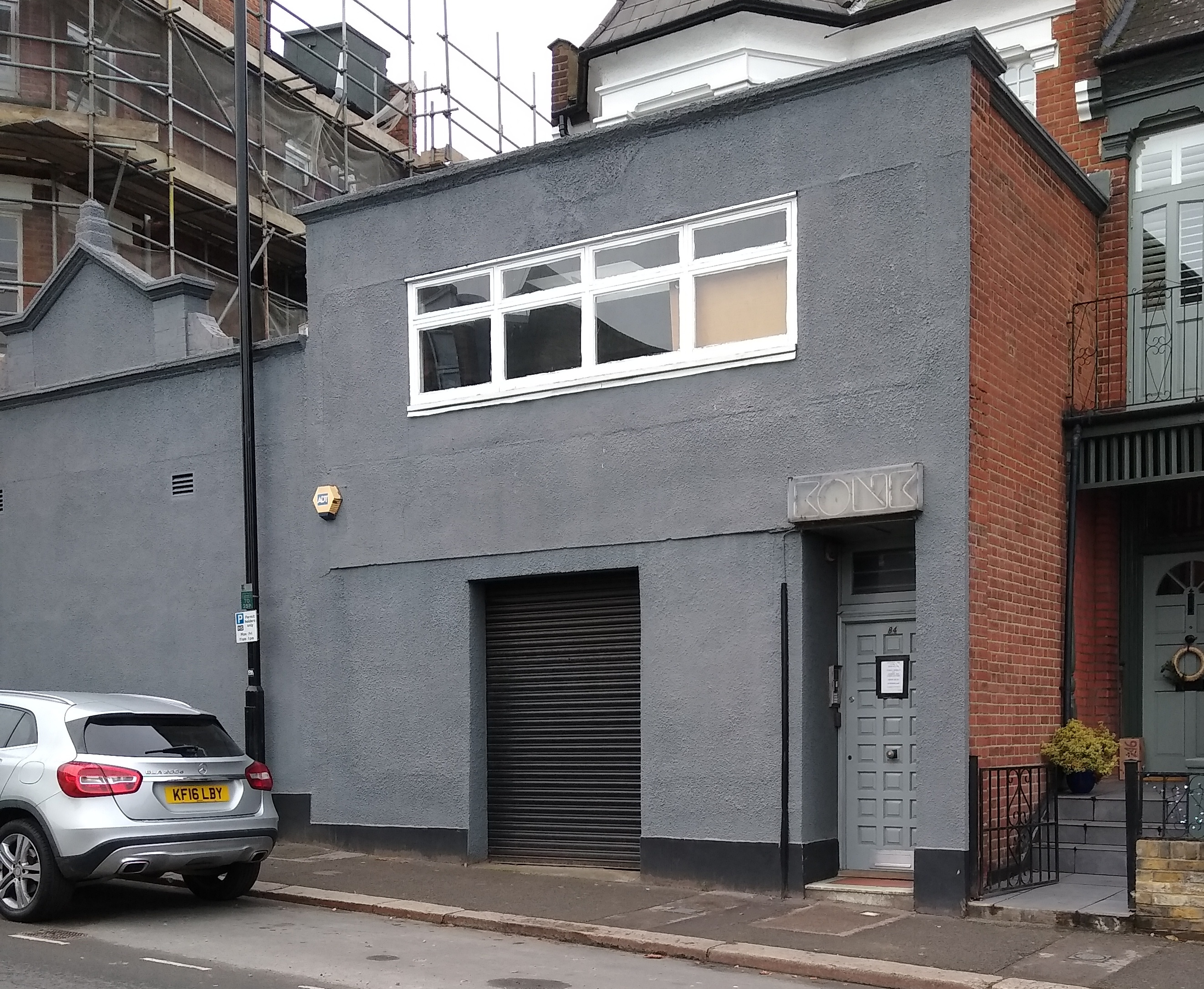
Front entrance to Konk Studios

In 1971, the Kinks left Pye Records for a five-album stint with RCA, who offered them a million-dollar advance. Ray and Dave Davies put this and money from recent hits like "Lola" towards a new studio of their own in Hornsey, a mile down the road from their home territory of Muswell Hill. In the past few years the group had mainly been recording at Morgan Studios, in Willesden, London. Albums recorded there included Lola Versus Powerman and the Moneygoround, Part One (1970), Percy (1971), Muswell Hillbillies (1971) and Everybody's in Show-Biz (1972).

The Kinks began recording full-time at the studio in about 1973. The group recorded the massive Preservation: Acts 1 & 2 (1973 & 1974) project at Konk, and it would remain their main studio until the group disbanded in 1996. It received a considerable amount of attention in 2008 when English Indie rock group the Kooks recorded an album there, titled Konk (2008), which topped the UK albums chart in April that year.

In 1989, Big Audio Dynamite recorded Megatop Phoenix, their final album together, at Konk, and in its liner notes stated that they considered the Kinks an inspiration. In the same year, the Stone Roses recorded tracks for their debut album at Konk.

In 1991 the studios were used to record tracks for Rumor and Sigh, the sixth solo album by Richard Thompson.

In July 2010, Ray Davies put the studio up for sale as a redevelopment property, presumably to be demolished. In June 2011 Davies announced a delay in the sale saying "It was up for sale but I've got another record I've got to do so we're debating what to do now. It's open for discussion".

In 2012, the Fall recorded tracks for their album Re-Mit at Konk Studios.

== Rooms ==
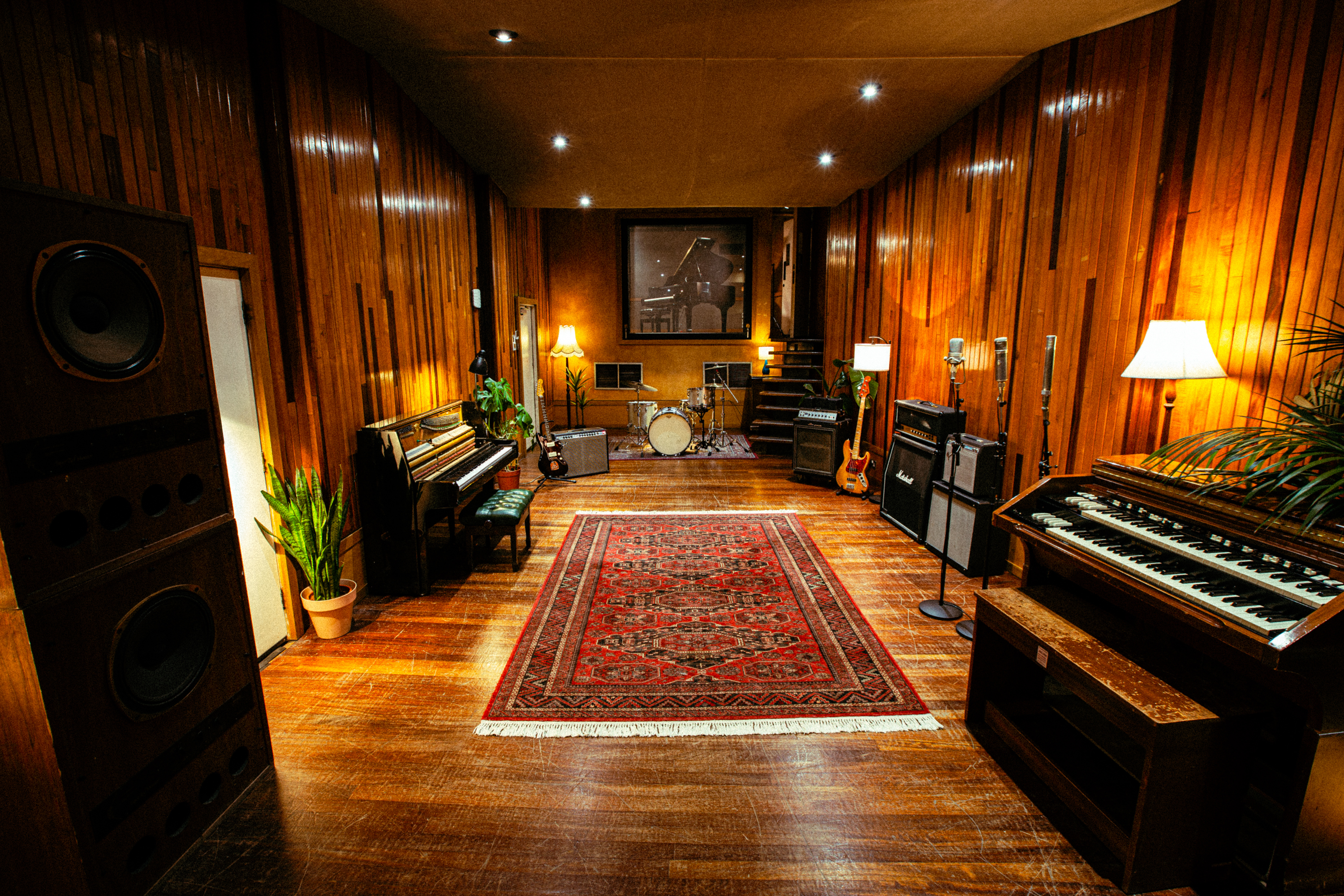
Studio 1's Live Room

The main room of Konk is the Neve Room, which was featured in the Kinks' 1983 "State of Confusion" music video. The other important room at Konk is the SSL room, opened in the early 1980s, used mainly for mixing and editing tracks.
