= Songs of Faith and Devotion Live =

1993 live album by Depeche Mode

Live album by Depeche Mode
- Released: 6 December 1993
- Recorded: 27 May 1993 (Copenhagen); 4 June 1993 (Milan); 29 July 1993 (Liévin); 8 October 1993 (New Orleans)
- Venue: Forum Copenhagen (Copenhagen); Forum di Milano (Milan); Stade Couvert Régional (Liévin); Lakefront Arena (New Orleans)
- Length: 52:46
- Label: Mute
- Producer: Alan Wilder; Steve Lyon

Depeche Mode chronology
Songs of Faith and Devotion (1993)	Songs of Faith and Devotion Live (1993)	Ultra (1997)

Songs of Faith and Devotion Live is the second live album by the English electronic music band Depeche Mode, released on 6 December 1993 by Mute Records in the UK. Recorded during the band's 1993 Devotional Tour, the album consists mainly of performances recorded in Liévin, France, with tracks recorded in Copenhagen, Milan and New Orleans. It was a track-by-track live duplication of Depeche Mode's eighth studio album, Songs of Faith and Devotion, which was released earlier in 1993.

The album was poorly received by critics and performed moderately on the charts, reaching number 46 on the UK Albums Chart and number 193 on the US Billboard 200.

A near-complete concert of the Devotional Tour was released on the Devotional video album in 1993, which attained more commercial success.

== Background ==
Depeche Mode had recorded Songs of Faith and Devotion in 1992, released in 1993. To support the album, the band embarked on the Devotional Tour, originally planned only to run through the end of 1993 but extended into mid-1994.

== Recording ==
The album was recorded during the European leg of the 1993 Devotional Tour, with recordings taken from three shows: 27 May 1993 in Copenhagen, 4 June 1993 in Milan, and 27 July 1993 in Liévin. However, none of the performances of "One Caress" using live musicians were satisfactory according to band member Alan Wilder, who said, "We couldn't find a decent version of 'One Caress' using the various 'real' string quartets, which accounts for the sampled one [on the album]. Most of the hired musicians played astonishingly poorly." The live version of "One Caress" was recorded on 8 October 1993 in New Orleans during the US leg of the tour.

Recorded by the band's sound engineer Steve Lyon, Lyon and Wilder went to Windmill Lane Studios in Dublin in August 1993 between legs of the tour to mix the album. Additional, final mixing of the album took place at Studio Guillaume Tell in Paris and Olympic Studios in Paris.

The decision was made by Mute Records to have the album mirror the running order of the studio album, in what Wilder called

"a deliberate – and some might say cynical – attempt to prolong sales of the studio album of the same name. Having the identical running order meant that it could be given the same catalogue number – hence the elongated chart position. I also think the general consensus was that it was too soon after 101 to do another similar live album, and, anyway, we were putting together [the] Devotional video that would give an ever greater feeling of a [Depeche Mode] live show."

Some songs, such as "I Feel You" and "Condemnation" were pitched down a semitone so that lead singer Dave Gahan could sing them more easily. Said Wilder, "The only way to do this successfully was to adjust each sound individually. The tempo remained the same [as the original studio tracks], so any non-musical part didn't need to be changed."

Of Gahan's performance on the live album, Wilder said, "There is a degradation in [Gahan's] vocals during some of the live performances from [the] Devotional Tour, but this is partly down to the stresses and strains of extensive touring and perfectly understandable. That said, I would rather hear a cracked and rough sounding voice that is full of emotion [rather than] one that is technically perfect, but bland and lifeless."

== Release ==
Songs of Faith and Devotion Live was released on 6 December 1993 by Mute Records in the UK and given catalogue number LSTUMM106, to mirror Songs of Faith and Devotion's catalogue number STUMM106.

The album spent a single week on the Billboard charts in the US, and while it did better in the UK, it was at that point the only Depeche Mode album released that failed to crack the UK's top ten album list. As of April 2006, it had sold 114,000 copies in the United States.

In 1994, to help promote the tour's swing through Oceania, Liberation Records of Australia released a limited double pack release of the original Songs of Faith and Devotion and Songs of Faith and Devotion Live combined into a single package with a unique sleeve, given catalogue number D93398.

== Critical reception ==
Professional ratings
Review scores
Source	Rating
AllMusic	2/5 stars
The Encyclopedia of Popular Music	3/5 stars
Entertainment Weekly	F
The Rolling Stone Album Guide	2/5 stars

In comparison to Songs of Faith and Devotion, Songs and Faith and Devotion Live received less acclaim from music critics; AllMusic rated the album two stars out of five.

The A.V. Club rated Songs of Faith and Devotion Live as the "Least Essential Live Album" of the 1990s, saying, "Depeche Mode has plugged in plenty of DAT and drum machines during its live performances, thereby allowing the band to crank out note-perfect versions of its studio hits. Featuring every track on Songs of Faith and Devotion, played live and in order, the album's live counterpart is monumentally unnecessary." In the same feature, the album was listed as one of ten nominees for "Least Essential Album" of the decade with the comment, "It's not like Depeche Mode is inclined to rely on radical instrumental improvisation live."

== Track listing ==
All tracks are written by Martin L. Gore.

No.	Title	Length
1.	"I Feel You"	7:11
2.	"Walking in My Shoes"	6:41
3.	"Condemnation"	3:55
4.	"Mercy in You"	4:20
5.	"Judas"	5:01
6.	"In Your Room"	6:47
7.	"Get Right with Me"	3:11
8.	"Rush"	4:35
9.	"One Caress"	3:35
10.	"Higher Love"	7:30
Total length:		52:46

== Personnel ==
Credits adapted from the liner notes of Songs of Faith and Devotion Live.

=== Depeche Mode ===
- Alan Wilder
- Martin Gore
- Dave Gahan
- Andy Fletcher

=== Additional musicians ===
- Hildia Campbell – backing vocals
- Samantha Smith – backing vocals

=== Technical ===
- Alan Wilder – production, mixing
- Steve Lyon – production, mixing, recording
- Peter Brandt – recording assistance
- Rob Kirwan – mixing assistance
- Alex Firla – mixing assistance
- Jeremy Wheatley – mixing assistance
- Kevin Metcalfe – mastering
- JD Fanger – album coordination
- Daryl Bamonte – album coordination
- Pepe Jansz – album coordination

=== Artwork ===
- Anton Corbijn – visuals, art direction, sleeve design
- Area – sleeve design

== Charts ==
Chart performance for Songs of Faith and Devotion Live
Chart (1993–1994)	Peak position
Australian Albums (ARIA)	27
Dutch Albums (Album Top 100)	85
European Albums (Music & Media)	70
German Albums (Offizielle Top 100)	50
Swedish Albums (Sverigetopplistan)	22
Swiss Albums (Schweizer Hitparade)	47
UK Albums (OCC)	46
US Billboard 200	193
