= The Videos 86–98 =

The Videos 86>98

Video by Depeche Mode
- Released: 28 September 1998; 25 November 2002 (Videos 86>98 +)
- Recorded: 1986–1998
- Length: 126 minutes
- Label: Mute; Reprise
- Director: Various
- Producer: Clive Richardson

Depeche Mode chronology
Devotional (1993)	The Videos 86>98 (1998)	One Night in Paris (2002)

Alternative cover
- Videos 86>98 + cover

The Videos 86>98 is a music video compilation by the English electronic music band Depeche Mode, released to coincide with their compilation album The Singles 86>98. It was released in 1998 on VHS and DVD, and features 21 music videos and two short documentaries.

In 2002, an expanded 2-DVD edition, Videos 86>98 + (without "The", and with "+") was released. It includes all the material from the original release on DVD 1, as well as bonus material on DVD 2.

== 1998 VHS: Mute Films / MF033 ==
1. Intro (short documentary on the making of some of the videos, 1998)
  - Directed by Sven Harding
2. Stripped – (Black Celebration, February 1986)
  - Directed by Peter Care
3. A Question of Lust – (Black Celebration, April 1986)
  - Directed by Martyn Atkins
4. A Question of Time – (Black Celebration, August 1986)
  - Directed by Anton Corbijn
5. Strangelove (unedited) – (Music for the Masses, April 1987)
  - Directed by Anton Corbijn
6. Never Let Me Down Again (short version) – (Music for the Masses, August 1987)
  - Directed by Anton Corbijn
7. Behind the Wheel (short version) – (Music for the Masses, December 1987)
  - Directed by Anton Corbijn
8. Little 15 – (Music for the Masses, May 1988)
  - Directed by Martyn Atkins
9. Everything Counts (live) – (101, February 1989)
  - Directed by D. A. Pennebaker
10. Personal Jesus (unedited) – (Violator, August 1989)
  - Directed by Anton Corbijn
11. Enjoy the Silence – (Violator, February 1990)
  - Directed by Anton Corbijn
12. Policy of Truth – (Violator, May 1990)
  - Directed by Anton Corbijn
13. World in My Eyes (MTV version) – (Violator, September 1990)
  - Directed by Anton Corbijn
14. I Feel You – (Songs of Faith and Devotion, February 1993)
  - Directed by Anton Corbijn
15. Walking in My Shoes (unedited) – (Songs of Faith and Devotion, April 1993)
  - Directed by Anton Corbijn
16. Condemnation (live version from Devotional) – (Songs of Faith and Devotion, September 1993)
  - Directed by Anton Corbijn
17. In Your Room – (Songs of Faith and Devotion, January 1994)
  - Directed by Anton Corbijn
18. Barrel of a Gun (original) – (Ultra, February 1997)
  - Directed by Anton Corbijn
19. It's No Good – (Ultra, March 1997)
  - Directed by Anton Corbijn
20. Home – (Ultra, June 1997)
  - Directed by Steven Green
21. Useless – (Ultra, October 1997)
  - Directed by Anton Corbijn
22. Only When I Lose Myself – (The Singles 86>98, September 1998)
  - Directed by Brian Griffin, cinematography by Eric Alan Edwards
23. Depeche Mode – A Short Film (short documentary on the band's history during 1986–1998, 1998)
  - Directed by Sven Harding

== 1998 DVD: Mute / DVDMuteL5 ==
- Same as VHS release

== 2002 DVD: Mute / DMDVD2 ==
=== Disc one ===
- Same as 1998 VHS and DVD

=== Disc two ===
The videos

1. But Not Tonight (from the film Modern Girls) – (Black Celebration, 1986)
  - Directed by Tamra Davis
2. Strangelove '88 (US version) – (1988)
  - Directed by Martyn Atkins
3. One Caress – (Songs of Faith and Devotion, 1993)
  - Directed by Kevin Kerslake
4. Condemnation (Paris mix) – (Songs of Faith and Devotion, 1993)
  - Directed by Anton Corbijn

Short films

1. Violator – electronic press kit (11 November 1990)
2. Songs of Faith and Devotion – electronic press kit (27 January 1993)
3. Ultra – electronic press kit (26 February 1997)

Easter egg

- Track 10 of this disc features the "Rush" easter egg. This is a short (one-minute) montage of the various graphics the design firm Intro created for The Singles releases, set to a re-edited version of the song with the same name.

== Personnel ==
- Dave Gahan
- Martin Gore
- Andy Fletcher
- Alan Wilder (member of the band from 1982 to 1995, and does not appear in any of the videos made after 1995, except "Intro" and "Depeche Mode – A Short Film")
- Nassim Khalifa – black haired woman in the "Strangelove" video
- Lysette Anthony – woman in the "I Feel You" video
- Ippolita Santarelli – woman in the "Behind the Wheel" video
- Hildia Campbell – backup singer in the "Condemnation" live video
- Samantha Smith – backup singer in the "Condemnation" live video
- Daniel Miller – seen in interviews
- Anton Corbijn – seen in interviews

== Certifications ==
Certifications for The Videos 86>98
Region	Certification	Certified units/sales
Poland (ZPAV)	Gold	5,000^{*}
^{*} Sales figures based on certification alone.
