= Devotional (video) =

1993 video album by Depeche Mode

Video by Depeche Mode
- Released: 23 November 1993
- Recorded: 17; 21; 29 July 1993
- Venues: Palau Sant Jordi (Barcelona); Stade Couvert Régional (Liévin); Festhalle (Frankfurt)
- Length: 94 minutes
- Labels: Mute; Sire; Reprise
- Director: Anton Corbijn

Depeche Mode chronology
Strange Too (1990)	Devotional (1993)	The Videos 86>98 (1998)

Professional ratings
Review scores
Source	Rating
AllMusic	3/5 stars

Devotional – A Performance Filmed by Anton Corbijn is a video release by the English electronic music band Depeche Mode, featuring almost an entire concert from their 1993 Devotional Tour, filmed in Barcelona (Palau Sant Jordi), Liévin (Stade Couvert Régional) and Frankfurt (Festhalle). It was directed by Anton Corbijn, and released in 1993. It was nominated for the Grammy Award for Best Long Form Music Video in 1995.

== Background ==
Depeche Mode had recorded their album Songs of Faith and Devotion over the course of 1992, and the album was released in March 1993. During recording, relationships between the band members frayed, and lead singer Dave Gahan was suffering from an addiction to heroin. The supporting tour was separated into three legs, the 1993 Devotional leg and the 1994 Exotic and Summer '94 legs.

The performances were directed by long-time Depeche Mode visual collaborator Anton Corbijn. The video is the last release to feature Alan Wilder before his departure in 1995.

== Recording and mixing ==
The video for Devotional was assembled from performances over three nights during the 1993 Devotional leg of the tour: 17 July 1993 in Barcelona, Spain, 21 July 1993 in Frankfurt, Germany, and 29 July 1993 in Liévin, France.

Band member Alan Wilder and the band's sound engineer for the album Steve Lyon mixed the live tracks for the album in August of 1993, while on a month-long break between the UK and US legs of the tour.

== Release ==
Devotional was released on VHS and laserdisc in late 1993. The laserdisc release contained an extra five tracks that were not included on the VHS release. In the UK, the video was distributed by Mute Records and BMG.

The video was nominated for the Grammy Award for Best Long Form Music Video.

In 2004, the film was re-released on DVD, featuring isolated footage of set list projections, an interview with Corbijn on Devotional (1993) and remastered music videos from the Songs of Faith and Devotion era.

== Reviews ==
Q magazine reviewed the 1993 release positively, saying "It's all faultlessly conceived and presented, and equally well filmed and edited. An absorbing experience even for non-die-hard fans. Devotional is a wonderful, creative example of achieving success without artistic compromise." England's The Times said of the show, "The group was masterfully theatrical. An electronically generated thunder storm preceded [Depeche Mode]'s arrival on the stage. ... There was something monumental about the proceedings and it was a performance of poise and skill."

== Track listing ==
=== 1993 VHS: BMG / 74321 17213-3 / Laserdisc: Warner Reprise Video / 9 38346-6 ===
1. "Higher Love" from Songs of Faith and Devotion (1993)
2. "World in My Eyes" from Violator (1990)
3. "Walking in My Shoes" from Songs of Faith and Devotion (1993)
4. "Behind the Wheel" from Music for the Masses (1987)
5. "Stripped" from Black Celebration (1986)
6. "Condemnation" from Songs of Faith and Devotion (1993)
7. "Judas" from Songs of Faith and Devotion (1993)
8. "Mercy in You" from Songs of Faith and Devotion (1993)
9. "I Feel You" from Songs of Faith and Devotion (1993)
10. "Never Let Me Down Again" from Music for the Masses (1987)
11. "Rush" from Songs of Faith and Devotion (1993)
12. "In Your Room" from Songs of Faith and Devotion (1993)
13. "Personal Jesus" from Violator (1990)
14. "Enjoy the Silence" from Violator (1990)
15. "Fly on the Windscreen" from Black Celebration (1986)
16. "Everything Counts" from Construction Time Again (1983)
17. "Death's Door" (Acoustic) [no video footage, audio only and is played during the credits]

=== 1993 VHS: Warner Reprise Video / 3-38346 ===
1. "Higher Love"
2. "World in My Eyes"
3. "Walking in My Shoes"
4. "Stripped"
5. "Condemnation"
6. "Judas"
7. "I Feel You"
8. "Never Let Me Down Again"
9. "Rush"
10. "In Your Room"
11. "Personal Jesus"
12. "Enjoy the Silence"

=== 2004 DVD: Mute Film / DMDVD4 ===
==== Disc one ====
1. Devotional: A Performance Filmed by Anton Corbijn (see above for songlist)

Bonus tracks

18. "Halo" from Violator (1990)
19. "Policy of Truth" from Violator (1990)

==== Disc two ====
- Tour projections (Note: Rather than use the eight-screen Devotional Tour projections, it was easier to use the almost identical one-screen Exotic Tour projections. The isolated video of the projections were played with audio of the intended song.)
1. "Walking in My Shoes"
2. "Stripped"
3. "Condemnation"
4. "Judas"
5. "I Feel You"
6. "Never Let Me Down Again" (Note: The first half of the video was lost and unable to be recovered. Instead, it features a message from Corbijn, apologising and saying that the footage has "met its maker".)
7. "In Your Room"
8. "Enjoy the Silence"
- Promotional music videos
1. "I Feel You"
2. "Walking in My Shoes"
3. "Condemnation"
4. "In Your Room"
5. "One Caress"
6. "Condemnation" (live) [mixed in with the tour projection video]
- MTV Documentary – Depeche Mode Rockumentary 1993
- Monologue by Anton Corbijn – A short film by James Rose
- Devotional and Exotic tour programmes

=== 2004 UMD: Mute Film / DMUMD4 ===
1. Devotional: A Performance Filmed by Anton Corbijn (see above for songlist)
- All songs written by Martin Gore.

== Personnel ==
- Dave Gahan – lead vocals
- Martin Gore – guitar, keyboards, lead and backing vocals
- Alan Wilder – keyboards, piano, drums, percussion pads, backing vocals
- Andy Fletcher – keyboards, backing vocals
- Hildia Campbell – backing vocals
- Samantha Smith – backing vocals

== Charts ==
Chart performance for Devotional
Chart (2004)	Peak position
Austrian Music DVDs Chart	7
Belgian (Flanders) Music DVDs Chart	2
Belgian (Wallonia) Music DVDs Chart	1
German Albums Chart	25
Norwegian Music DVDs Chart	2
Spanish Music DVDs Chart	1
Swedish Music DVDs Chart	1
US Music Video Chart	27

== Certifications ==
Certifications for Devotional
Region	Certification	Certified units/sales
Poland (ZPAV)	Gold	5,000^{*}
^{*} Sales figures based on certification alone.
