= Bamonte =

Bamonte is an Italian surname. Notable people with the surname include:

- Daryl Bamonte, English musician and artist manager
- Perry Bamonte (1960–2025), English musician
