= Devotional Tour =

1993–94 concert tour by Depeche Mode

- Tour by Depeche Mode
- Poster advertising the Depeche Mode concert held in Dortmund, Germany.
- Associated album: Songs of Faith and Devotion
- Start date: 19 May 1993
- End date: 8 July 1994
- Legs: 3
- No. of shows: 86 in North America; 46 in Europe; 10 in Africa; 9 in Oceania; 4 in South America; 1 in Central America; 156 in total

Depeche Mode concert chronology
- World Violation Tour (1990); Devotional Tour (1993–94); The Singles 86–98 Tour (1998)

The Devotional Tour was a 1993–94 concert tour by the English electronic band Depeche Mode in support of the group's eighth studio album, Songs of Faith and Devotion, which was released in March 1993. Consisting of three legs, the 1993 Devotional Tour, 1994 Exotic Tour and the Summer Tour '94, it was the last Depeche Mode tour to include member Alan Wilder, who quit the band in 1995 due to the poor relationship between band members and experience while recording the album.

The Devotional Tour leg kicked off in Lille, France, in mid-May 1993 and crossed Europe and North America. In 1994, the Exotic and Summer '94 legs visited territories which the band had never performed in or had not toured in for some time, reaching Africa, Asia, Australia, and South America, as well as returning to North America.

Different performances from the 1993 leg of the tour were released on the live album Songs of Faith and Devotion Live (1993) and live video Devotional (1993).

The tour was named by Q magazine "the most debauched rock tour ever" due to its excesses of sex and drugs. Singer Dave Gahan was struggling with a heroin addiction while on tour, leading to a drug-induced heart attack midway through the first leg. Singer and songwriter Martin Gore suffered two drinking-related seizures on the tour, and both Gahan and Gore were arrested once each for different infractions during the tour.

The tour was estimated to have played to two million fans over the course of its two-leg run.

== Background ==
Depeche Mode had recorded their album Songs of Faith and Devotion from February through December of 1992, releasing it in March 1993. The band planned a tour to last through the end of 1993 in support of the album. It was the band's first tour since their 1990 World Violation Tour.

The development of the album had been difficult due to fraying relationships within the band and lead singer Dave Gahan's growing heroin addiction. Band member Andy Fletcher later said, "during the whole recording of that album, all the early signs of the break-up that was going to come were starting to become apparent. And we agreed to do this year-and-half tour – straight from the album, straight to tour. It was probably the worst two years of our lives."

== Tour development ==
Long-time collaborator Anton Corbijn, who had designed the album's and supporting singles' cover art and had shot most of their recent music videos, was asked to design the stage and projections for the tour. Corbijn admitted that he didn't know much about designing tour sets, and didn't plan for how much it might cost to support the stage as it moved around the world. Corbijn produced nearly 45 minutes of original video and film for the tour. According to Wilder, "We didn't want it to be like the last tour, where Anton's films were used almost as an afterthought". The set was designed on a computer so the band could easily see how it would appear from any angle.

According to band member Alan Wilder, the tour was "planned by ourselves, our agent and Jonathan [Kessler]. Between us all, taking into account many factors, we would decide which countries and cities to play and when. Once we had a general plan, the specific routing would be optimised, again depending on travel times, venue availability, local promoter advice, record release dates and other logistical considerations." Kessler, who had been with the band for several years, was called their "spiritual adviser" and "manager", despite the band being self-managed for many years. Said Wilder, "[Kessler] became more and more involved in the coordination of tours, and his skills go way beyond pure financial organisation. As his tour negotiations invariably involved talking to record companies and promoters, it was, for him, a natural progression towards management. He is the kind of manager who does not get involved in the musical or artistic aspects of the band, but rather excels at public relations and people management."

Wilder started working with sound engineer Steve Lyon to prepare the backing tracks for the songs for the tour around Christmas 1992. Wilder and Lyon struggled with a Roland Corporation sequencer, saying,

"Unfortunately, putting the Devotional live show together proved to be more of a handful than either myself or Steve [Lyon] bargained for. We knew when we started that we didn't have a lot of time on our hands, and it didn't help that the Roland sequencer was giving us continual problems. However, we persevered and had nearly completed the work when disaster struck: the machine couldn't handle the sheer volume of traffic we were demanding from it and one day the whole system just crashed – we lost everything; three-and-a-half months of work! Luckily, we had the foresight to back up all the music onto multitrack [tape], but the edits had gone."

Wilder and Lyon then "worked night and day" for a few weeks to re-edit the tour based on the multitrack backup. The band ended up suing Roland, who refunded the price of the two machines they had purchased, worth around £20,000 at the time, about £43,000 today. According to Wilder, "the problem was that we had also invested in loads of data – DAT backup equipment, which became redundant. also, ... we had to acquire two digital multitrack machines to take on the road instead, so we still lost out financially." The work was started at Olympic Studios in London, and finished at Thin Line Studios. Wilder said that they tried to play as much of the music live as possible in concert, but some of it was always pre-recorded.

Early rehearsals were held in a West London rehearsal studio in early 1993, where a one-quarter scale set was built. Rehearsals for the tour concluded in Lille, France, at the same venue that the tour began on 19 May 1993.

== Staff ==
Originally, the band had a crew of sixty-five designated for the tour, which grew to approximately 120 by the time the tour began. Someone to keep the grand piano in tune was included among the entourage they brought on tour. Wilder knew that Gahan would struggle with his addiction on the road, and so insisted that they pay $4000 per week to bring a professional psychiatrist along with them. Wilder said the goal was to help get Gahan off of his drug addiction, which didn't happen. Said Wilder, "ironically, I think everyone went to see the shrink at some point – except Dave [Gahan]!"

For the first time on a tour, the band brought backup singers with them, Hildia Campbell and Samantha Smith, who both had also provided backup vocals on some songs on Songs of Faith and Devotion.

== Set design and equipment ==
The set was described as "an elaborate stage on two levels. Raised at the back, [songwriter] Martin Gore, Fletcher and Wilder would bleep keyboards in front of eleven enormous video screens of gnomic, abstract imagery: down below them, prowling an empty space, Dave Gahan would do his ultimate-rock-star shtick." The band reported that it took ten trucks and four busses to move all the staff and equipment from city to city. According to the official tour book, the set was "a construction of metal grids, nine large video screens and two massive film screens. [Corbijn] has commissioned four sculptures of the enigmatic primitive shapes featured across the band's recent cover artwork. And the stage lighting is dominated by purple and red to suggest both the voluptuousness and religiousness of Martin’s writing." According to the Corbijn, influences for the set included the artists Andy Warhol and Gilbert & George, and as such included multiple images, often repeated with slight variations.

The tour was the first tour for Depeche Mode where they had in-ear monitors to hear what they were playing. Said Wilder, it "was the first where I could actually hear what I was doing. ... The main advantage for me was the fact that it blocked Dave [Gahan]'s side-fills, which [threw] out his vocals at ball-busting decibel levels. The volume of his voice used to be so loud that it could obliterate all the rhythm tracks as well as our keyboards and vocals." The band also had concealed floor monitors "for low bass frequencies."

There were no synthesisers used during the tour, instead Wilder, Gore and Fletcher had keyboards they used which were tied to Emax II machines. Wilder would program the sounds across everyone's keyboards, and new presets for new songs, or parts of songs, could be loaded off of hard disk into a keyboard with a foot switch. These triggered sounds on the Emax via MIDI. To synchronise with Corbijn's videos, the film ran via SMPTE sync codes from the multi-track tape. For some songs, such as "Judas", slow-moving videos of candle flames 'free-ran', with no need to sync to the music.

For some tracks during the tour, Wilder played live drums, a Yamaha Drums 9000. Gore played two Gibson Country Gentlemen guitars and two Gretsch Anniversary guitars.

== Set lists ==
The band wanted some variety in the setlists for the tour. Said Wilder, "this was to be a long haul and to play exactly the same songs night after night for 15 months would have been agony. You also have to consider each different country, because every audience reacts differently, preferring different songs that have been particular to their territory." Due to the partially pre-programmed nature of the tracks, tapes were made for four different setlists, split in two halves for eight tapes total. Given that partway through a show, Gore would typically perform an acoustic track, this allowed the band to change up the setlist from night to night by switching up the tapes. Said Wilder,

"We had four set lists – red, green, yellow, blue. ... Effectively, therefore, we could mix and match any combination of first and second half tapes. ... This gave us the opportunity to perform many different running orders, although all of them had the same overall shape and structure. So, for example, a quick chat beforehand might result in 'Let's play the blue/red set tonight with 'Somebody' instead of 'I Want You Now' in the middle. We could also change tapes for the encores, if necessary."

The opening track of the 1993 Devotional leg of the tour was "Higher Love", in which the band performed behind dark gauze curtains, with a faux thunder and lightning show to open the night. "Walking in My Shoes" was the first song performed that showed off Corbijn's stage design; behind Gahan on the lower level, five eight foot by eight foot screens, previously only backlit with colour, "transformed into full-blow synchronised video screens, through which 'walked' several disturbing Corbijn-created characters. These included a 'bird-headed' woman lit blood-red, strutting in a slow-moving, strangely sexual predatory manner, set against a deep blue background." Said Corbijn, "The aim is to build up a mood throughout the set, rather than flabbergast the audience in the first few seconds", further adding that "The lighting and the imagery we use on the screens are meant to enhance the songs, make the music work stronger, not to browbeat the audience into submission, but to seduce them. It's a very simple idea I want things to look simple and bold." Gahan concurred, saying that "The tension will be quite carefully built. It definitely won't be an explosive start, it's something that begins quite slowly, and picks up pace, gradually unfolding. Basically it's quite stark, dark and moody."

Some songs, such as "Condemnation" were played entirely live, with no backing tracks, with Wilder on an acoustic grand piano.

Early in the tour, for four songs, on "I Feel You", "Never Let Me Down Again", "Rush" and "In Your Room", Wilder played live drums on stage. During the 1994 legs of the tour, as Wilder's drum skills developed, he also drummed along to "Stripped", "Halo" and "A Question of Time". Said Wilder, he also had "a couple of electronic pads which were incorporated into the kit for triggering samples – [on] 'Personal Jesus' for example, [but] to have played the older songs on an electronic drum kit would have been very difficult since many of the parts are unplayable. ... I also don't think it would have been as much fun."

"One Caress" was played only a few times with a live string quartet, including in London during the Devotional leg. "Something to Do", from Some Great Reward, was played on tour once, on 25 May 1993 in Brussels.

== Tour incidents ==
=== 1993 Devotional leg ===
The fractures between the band that had grown during the album's recording sessions continued during the tour; Gahan and Wilder took their own limos from hotels to the show, with Gore and Fletcher arriving in a third. Producer and label owner Daniel Miller later said, "It was different limos, different hotel floors. I don't think anyone spoke to Dave [Gahan] the entire tour. They saw Dave on stage and then he went off into his dressing room and his candles and everything. Alan [Wilder] wasn't really talking to Martin [Gore] and [Fletcher]. Obviously it was very sad." The band attempted interventions with Gahan, as they had during recording the album, but their efforts went unheeded. When Corbijn made the video for the album's final single, "In Your Room", he made it as a sort of retrospective of all previous Depeche Mode videos, because he wasn't confident that the band would continue to exist after the tour.

==== European leg ====
The European leg started on 19 May 1993 in France and ran through 31 July, ending in London.

The English band Spiritualized were originally hired to be the tour's opening act, but audiences reacted so poorly to them at early dates that the band were replaced by Miranda Sex Garden after about a month. Spiritualized were told on 28 May that they wouldn't be needed after the show on 29 May, leading Spiritualized to refuse to open for Depeche Mode for the 29 May show in Stockholm. To fill in at the last minute, Depeche Mode asked the band who were playing at their hotel to play as the opening act instead, which they did. Miranda Sex Garden was able to take over the opening slot starting with the 31 May show in Hanover. Opening some nights on the Devotional leg of the tour was The Sisters of Mercy.

On 1 and 2 July 1993, after playing two nights in Paris, Wilder and Lyon went to Studio Guillaume Tell, where they had recorded some of the songs from Music for the Masses years earlier, to remix their single "Condemnation", giving the remix the name "Paris mix."

Some songs from the show on 15 July 1993 in Madrid were recorded and later released as the B-sides to the "Condemnation" single. On 29 July 1993, the show in Liévin, France was at least partially recorded, with some live tracks being released in early 1994 on the B-side to their single "In Your Room", the live album Songs of Faith and Devotion Live (1993) and the live video Devotional (1993).

By the time the tour reached Budapest in late July 1993, the press were noticing and reporting on Gahan's behavior, and the band's excesses, noting the presence of women lining up to get in to Depeche Mode's afterparty. Gahan and Gore were not the only members of the band to be seen enjoying excesses of alcohol and drugs; Wilder, too, was "knocking back double tequila shots" and had an unpleasant, drunken run-in with fans in Budapest. The end of the European leg of the tour in Crystal Palace, London on 31 July 1993 was recorded and broadcast by BBC2 in the United Kingdom. The press reported that the band's end-of-leg party featured a VIP room with free tequila, champagne, and live sex acts.

During the break between the European and North American legs in August 1993, tracks recorded during the European leg for a live album were mixed by Wilder and Lyon, who went to Dublin to mix the live album at Windmill Lane Studios. The resulting live album, Songs of Faith and Devotion Live, was released in December 1993.

Internally, relationships between members of the band remained low; Wilder, Fletcher and Gore were referring to Gahan as "The Cunt" due to his behaviour.

==== North American leg ====
The North American leg started Quebec, Canada on 7 September 1993 and ran through 3 December, when it ended in Mexico City. After the first North American show in Quebec City, Canada, Gahan and tour co-manager Daryl Bamonte were arrested after Gahan assaulted a member of the hotel staff where they were staying. Charges against both were later dropped.

On 13 September 1993, Depeche Mode released their third single from the album, "Condemantion" in the US and UK.

On 8 October 1993, just before the encore of the show in New Orleans, Gahan suffered a drug-induced heart attack on stage. Said Gahan,

"It was during the last song. I literally couldn't hear anything, so I went off [stage]. Something was going on – I couldn't breathe, and the other guys were like 'We've gotta do an encore!' So Martin [Gore] and Alan [Wilder] decided to go back on and do a song, and the only song they could do off-the-cuff was 'Death's Door' ... so while I was being wheeled off on a gurney on the way to hospital, I could hear that in the background!"

Doctors warned Gahan that he should consider taking the rest of the tour off, or at least perform "on a stool" to prevent further heart damage, but Gahan refused and instead only the next show of the tour was cancelled before the tour resumed as normal.

The show on 24 October 1993 in Cincinnati was cancelled after Gahan cut his hand as he tried to open a beer bottle after the show the night before in Detroit.

In early November 1993, Gore was arrested after refusing to turn down the music at a party in his hotel room after a show. Gore was led away in handcuffs and put in jail overnight, but was released the next morning. Later that month, while in Los Angeles for a series of shows, Gore had a drinking-related seizure during a band meeting. Remembers Wilder, "We were all sitting around this boardroom table, when [Gore] stood up and then went weird. He shook a bit, his eyes glazed over, and then he was on the floor convulsing." Gore later admitted that he had had another seizure a few weeks earlier, by himself, although he hadn't recognized it at the time.

Around December 1993, as the Devotional Tour was coming to and end, the band met to decide whether or not they should continue touring. The elaborate stage's cost, their partying, private jets and expensive hotel rooms had meant they hadn't made much money from the tour so far, despite having to played to over a million fans. As a result, a vote was taken on whether or not the tour should be an extended. Only Fletcher voted against the idea, having seen the toll it had taken on his best friend Gore, when he had his seizure a month earlier. In addition, Fletcher was still struggling with depression, which had sidelined him during the recording of the album in 1992. Miller also thought continuing the tour would be a bad idea, later saying "I'd gone along to quite a number of dates [on tour] and you couldn't talk to Dave [Gahan] because he was locked in his dressing room. Martin [Gore] was drinking a lot and not enjoying it at all. [Fletcher] was very tense and [Wilder] was very distant. ... Then this idea of going back to America came up. I personally was very against it and very vocal about it." With Fletcher outvoted, the band extended their tour into 1994 with additional legs dubbed the Exotic Tour and Summer '94 tour.

==== UK leg ====
A short, five-stop European leg started on 12 December 1993 in Dublin, Ireland and ended on 20 December at Wembley Stadium in London.

=== 1994 Exotic leg ===
The second leg of the tour was scheduled to visit countries that the band had not played before, including parts of Africa, Asia, Australia, and South America, as well as returning to North America. The leg was divided into four sub-legs; an African leg, starting in Johannesburg, South Africa on 9 February 1994 and ending in Johannesburg on 26 February; an Oceania leg starting on 3 March 1994 in Singapore and ending on 26 March in Honolulu; a South and Central American leg starting in São Paulo, Brazil on 4 April 1994 and ending on 16 April in Monterrey, Mexico; and the US Summer Tour leg, starting on 12 May 1994 in Sacramento, California and ending in Indianapolis, Indiana on 8 July. On 10 January, while the tour was being retooled for the second leg, the band released "In Your Room" as the fourth and final single from the album in various territories.

Most of the band took January 1994 off for a holiday, except Wilder, who worked out changes to the tour's setlist for the upcoming leg in Milan. Given that the first shows would be played in the daylight, the thunder and lightning opening of "Higher Love" was dropped in favor of an updated version of "Rush", with Wilder performing drums live. Alongside "A Question of Time" and "Clean" (from Violator (1990)), Wilder also recorded an updated "trip-hop" version of "I Want You Now" (from Music for the Masses (1987)) for the second leg. Only Wilder, Lyon and Bamonte worked on the updated songs. Said Wilder, "The remaining members of the band didn't hear 'I Want You Now' or any of the other [additional] music until it was played on stage." The band also simplified the stage for the second leg, with Gore saying that for the first leg, "We had 11 or 14 screens on stage with visuals interacting between all the screens. I think we realised, maybe it was over the top. So we scaled it down for the second leg and I think that actually went over better with the audience, with just a couple of screens." The new set was less costly to maintain, construct and transport.

As an opening act for this leg of the tour, the band convinced Primal Scream to join the tour. Gahan was the one who argued for the choice, wanting a band that shared his drug habit. Although Gore would later say that stories of the band's excesses were exaggerated, Primal Scream was so put off by the level of drugs used by Depeche Mode on the leg, that they subsequently swore off drugs themselves. Media reported that the band continued to select a dozen or two of the most beautiful women to come backstage after shows for parties. A reporter for Select magazine showed up to interview Gahan, and found him "sitting in the middle of the room in an armchair, apparently shoveling cocaine up his nose at a frightening rate. Suddenly he seemed to realise that I was a journalist, and he pointed at me and one of his big flunkeys came and got me. ... He started burbling on about how people didn't understand him, but then his mood changed suddenly and he said, 'I'm gonna curse you!' and the next thing I know he's bitten me on the neck!" Gahan later said that he remembered meeting the journalist but doesn't remember biting him, although he did later admit he had "some fascination at the time with vampires."

In early February, when the tour was in South Africa, Wilder had some of his luggage stolen, despite being locked in secure storage that was patrolled by guards. Said Wilder, "We concluded that it must have been an inside job. ... I lost about £10,000 worth of clothing, some very personal bits and pieces and, of course, most of my stage outfits, which had to be remade."

The 22 February 1994 show in Durban had to be cancelled after Wilder was hospitalized on 21 February with kidney stones.

Once the tour resumed, Fletcher's depression started to drive a wedge further between him and Gahan and Wilder, who were both enjoying the hard-partying atmosphere of the tour. Said Gore, "It was very difficult. [Fletcher] has been my closest friend since we were 12. But for the other two, he'd become unbearable." As a result of Fletcher's depression and anxiety, and the dysfunction within the band, Fletcher made the decision to pull out of the tour after the shows in Honolulu on 25 and 26 March 1994. He later said, "I had had a nervous breakdown when we were recording the album. And then I went straight on tour, and it was a very long tour, a very stressful tour. And it just went on and on and on, and then they decided to do another American [leg], and I just didn't agree with doing it and thought it was a mistake, bad for our careers. I just needed a rest, so decided not to do it." As he left, Fletcher reportedly told Miller that he would not tour again so long as Wilder remained in the band. Later, Fletcher would say that "I just lost it. It was a breakdown." During the week break after the shows in Hawaii, the band enlisted Bamonte to take Fletcher's place on stage. While Gahan and Gore partied on the beaches, Wilder spent a week with Bamonte teaching him how to play the parts for the tour. Wilder later said that Bamonte "subsequently played it perfectly for the rest of the tour – pretty good, considering he'd hardly ever played a keyboard before in his life." Bamonte's first show was in São Paulo, Brazil on 4 April 1994.

In early April 1994, Kurt Cobain committed suicide, and news of his death reached the band on 10 April, while they were in Chile preparing for their show. Years later, Gahan said that "My first reaction was that I was angry. I was pissed off. I felt like he had stolen my idea; he'd beaten me to it. That's how fucked-up I was. I really was that gone."

=== 1994 US Summer leg ===
Promotional poster for the Summer '94 leg of the tour

To promote the US leg of the tour, Sire Records issued a promotional "Summer Tour '94 CD Sampler" (catalogue number PRO-CD-6950), which contained seven of the band's songs and had the US concert dates printed on the label.

The final show of the tour, played on 8 July 1994 in Indiana, saw a drunk Gahan forgetting the words to the set's closing number, "A Question of Time", and then stage dive into the crowd, landing on some seats and the concrete floor, after which he had to be taken to the hospital with two cracked ribs. Gahan later said "My body was going on nothing. I cracked two ribs but it took me 24 hours to feel anything because I was so drunk."

By the end of both legs of the tour, the band had visited twenty-seven countries and played to over two million people and 156 shows.

== Subsequent events ==
With the end of the tour, Gahan retreated to a cabin with his wife Conroy for a few weeks to convalesce after his stage dive, saying "I really enjoyed the Faith and Devotion tour; I enjoyed that whole two year experience. I was right in it: 'I'm going to fucking do it, goddam it! And no one's going to stop me!' It took me a few years to come down from it."

Gore later said of the tour, "It was endless parties. Out of control," adding "I don't think anyone was really the same after that tour." Gahan echoed that sentiment, saying that the tour "nearly killed us all, physically." Wilder would later say that his memories of the album and tour were "very dark", adding "I think something broke in me, during the making of that. ... It's perverse, because the music moves me more than anything else we've ever done." Fletcher later admitted that "we made mistakes with our [Devotional] tour. We planned too much and it was too long."

In August 1994, one month after the end of the tour, Gore married Boisvert, with whom he had his daughter back in 1991.

During the tour, Wilder had begun a relationship with Hepzibah Sessa of the band Miranda Sex Garden, who had opened for the band on some dates during the tour. After the tour completed, Wilder left his wife Jeri Young, whom he had married in 1991, for Sessa. Wilder also was not sure if he would stay in the band, saying later that "I took some time out after the tour [in late 1994] to be absolutely sure that I was thinking clearly. And I told myself that if I felt the same in six months' time or as with the last album, then I should stop."

Gahan and his wife Conroy returned to London for a few months, continuing their party lifestyle. Around September 1994, the couple moved back to Los Angeles. When Gahan started to go into rehab in early 1995, Conroy refused to stop using drugs, and left him.

Citing dissatisfaction with the band and his workload, Wilder quit Depeche Mode in mid-1995.

On 17 August 1995, Gahan checked out of another stint of rehab and returned to his Los Angeles home to find it ransacked. Gahan attempted suicide by slitting his wrists, but was saved by paramedics who were called to help. Gahan returned to using drugs shortly after his suicide attempt.

Depeche Mode did not tour for their 1997 album Ultra; their next tour would be in 1998 in support of The Singles 86–98 (1998).

== Releases ==
The concerts in Barcelona, Liévin and Frankfurt in July 1993 were filmed, with the compiled footage issued later that year on a video release entitled Devotional. Tracks from the first European leg of the tour were also recorded for a live album. The live album, titled Songs of Faith and Devotion Live, was released in December 1993 and was a track-by-track live duplicate of Songs of Faith and Devotion.

== Reviews ==
A review of the Hanover show in Melody Maker was positive, saying the show was "a masterpiece of subtlety; a stark Bauhaus reminder that stadium pomp, when stripped of the hoary trappings of MTV, can still hold you in awe at its sheer mind-blowing magnitude" and that it was "a purely pleasurable experience." NME reviewed the tour in Budapest on 27 August 1993, by which time Gahan's struggles with drug addiction had become obvious, with the review saying "[Gahan's] 'problems' have become Depeche Mode's dirty little secret – everybody in the camp knows about them. ... [Gahan] means to get things sorted out, he says. But everyone knows a rock'n'roll tour isn't really the place to start sorting things out." A review in The Times was positive, saying "The group was masterfully theatrical. An electronically generated thunder storm preceded Depeche Mode'ss arrival on the stage. ... There was something monumental about the proceedings and it was a performance of poise and skill." A review in The Irish Times also praised the show, saying "A two-tiered attack of synthesizers and vocals ensured that nobody's gob was left unsmacked, and when it was all over after an hour and three-quarters, a bright after-image burned in our retinas, and our heads throbbed like underground machines."

Q magazine later called the tour "the most debauched rock'n'roll tour ever" due to the excesses of drugs and sex during the tour.

== Set list ==
Devotional leg

1. "Higher Love"
2. "Policy of Truth"
3. "World in My Eyes"
4. "Walking in My Shoes"
5. "Behind the Wheel"
6. "Halo"
7. "Stripped"
8. "Condemnation"
  - "Judas" (*)
  - "A Question of Lust" (*)
  - "Death's Door" (*) (acoustic)
  - "One Caress" (*)
  - "Get Right with Me"
  - "Mercy in You"
9. "I Feel You"
10. "Never Let Me Down Again"
11. "Rush"
12. "In Your Room"
  Encore 1
13. "Personal Jesus"
14. "Enjoy the Silence"
  Encore 2
  - "Fly on the Windscreen"
  - "Something to Do" (only performance: 25 May 1993 Brussels)
  - "Somebody" (*)
15. "Everything Counts"

Exotic/Summer '94 leg

1. "Rush"
2. "Halo"
3. "Behind the Wheel"
4. "Everything Counts"
5. "World in My Eyes"
6. "Walking in My Shoes"
7. "Stripped"
8. "Condemnation" (*) (excluding Johannesburg dates)
  - "Judas" (*)
  - "A Question of Lust" (*)
  - "Waiting for the Night" (*)
  - "One Caress" (*)
  - "I Want You Now" (*)
  - "One Caress" (*)
  - "Somebody" (*)
9. "In Your Room"
10. "Never Let Me Down Again"
11. "I Feel You"
12. "Personal Jesus"
  Encore 1
13. "Somebody" (*)
14. "Fly on the Windscreen" (select dates)
15. "Enjoy the Silence"
  Encore 2
16. "Policy of Truth" (9 February – 14 April 1994)
17. "Clean" (select dates)
18. "A Question of Time"

Notes:

- Set lists differed between dates, with rotated songs (denoted above) and song omissions.
- "(*)" denotes song sung by Martin Gore.

== Tour dates ==
=== Devotional leg ===
Date	City	Country	Venue/Event
Europe
19 May 1993	Lille	France	Salle Espace Foire
21 May 1993	Zürich	Switzerland	Hallenstadion
24 May 1993	Brussels	Belgium	Forest National
25 May 1993	Brussels	Belgium	Forest National
27 May 1993	Copenhagen	Denmark	Forum Copenhagen
28 May 1993	Gothenburg	Sweden	Scandinavium
29 May 1993	Stockholm	Sweden	Stockholm Globe Arena
31 May 1993	Garbsen	Germany	Sportpark Garbsen
1 June 1993	Rotterdam	Netherlands	Rotterdam Ahoy
3 June 1993	Lausanne	Switzerland	Patinoire de Malley
4 June 1993	Assago	Italy	Forum di Assago
7 June 1993 (Note: The show in Rome was originally scheduled at the PalaGhiaccio, but the promoter moved it to the PalaEur a few weeks before the event.)	Rome	Italy	PalaEur
8 June 1993	Florence	Italy	Palazzetto dello sport di Firenze
10 June 1993	Nancy	France	Zénith de Nancy
11 June 1993	Nuremberg	Germany	Frankenhalle
12 June 1993	Mannheim	Germany	Maimarkthalle
14 June 1993	Dortmund	Germany	Westfalenhallen
15 June 1993	Dortmund	Germany	Westfalenhallen
16 June 1993	Berlin	Germany	Waldbühne
18 June 1993	Prague	Czech Republic	Letná Stadium
19 June 1993	Leipzig	Germany	Leipziger Festwiese
21 June 1993	Munich	Germany	Olympiahalle
23 June 1993	Vienna	Austria	Wiener Stadthalle
25 June 1993	Stuttgart	Germany	Hanns-Martin-Schleyer-Halle
26 June 1993	Lyon	France	Halle Tony Garnier
29 June 1993	Paris	France	Palais Omnisports de Paris-Bercy
30 June 1993	Paris	France	Palais Omnisports de Paris-Bercy
3 July 1993	Brest	France	Parc des expositions de la Penfeld
5 July 1993	Bordeaux	France	Patinoire de Mériadeck
7 July 1993	Toulon	France	Zénith Oméga de Toulon
10 July 1993	Porto	Portugal	Estádio do Futebol Clube do Porto
11 July 1993	Lisbon	Portugal	Estádio José Alvalade
13 July 1993	Pontevedra	Spain	Estadio Municipal de Pasarón
15 July 1993	Madrid	Spain	Plaza de Toros de Las Ventas
17 July 1993	Barcelona	Spain	Palau Sant Jordi
21 July 1993	Frankfurt	Germany	Festhalle Frankfurt
22 July 1993	Cologne	Germany	Sporthalle Köln
24 July 1993 (Note: The show on 24 July was part of Belga Beach Festival.)	Zeebrugge	Belgium	Belgische Kust
27 July 1993	Budapest	Hungary	Hidegkuti Nándor Stadium
29 July 1993	Liévin	France	Stade Couvert Régional
31 July 1993	London	England	Crystal Palace Athletics Stadium
North America
7 September 1993	Quebec City	Canada	Colisée de Québec
8 September 1993	Montreal	Canada	Montreal Forum
10 September 1993	Worcester	United States	Worcester Centrum
12 September 1993	Landover	United States	USAir Arena
14 September 1993	Hamilton	Canada	Copps Coliseum
15 September 1993	Toronto	Canada	SkyDome
17 September 1993	Pittsburgh	United States	Civic Arena
18 September 1993	Philadelphia	United States	The Spectrum
21 September 1993	East Rutherford	United States	Brendan Byrne Arena
23 September 1993	New York City	United States	Madison Square Garden
24 September 1993	New York City	United States	Madison Square Garden
25 September 1993	Uniondale	United States	Nassau Veterans Memorial Coliseum
27 September 1993	Hampton	United States	Hampton Coliseum
28 September 1993	Chapel Hill	United States	Dean Smith Center
29 September 1993	Atlanta	United States	Omni Coliseum
1 October 1993	Gainesville	United States	O'Connell Center
2 October 1993	Miami	United States	Miami Arena
3 October 1993	St. Petersburg	United States	Florida Suncoast Dome
5 October 1993	Orlando	United States	Orlando Arena
8 October 1993	New Orleans	United States	Lakefront Arena
10 October 1993	Houston	United States	The Summit
11 October 1993	Houston	United States	The Summit
13 October 1993	Dallas	United States	Reunion Arena
14 October 1993	Dallas	United States	Reunion Arena
15 October 1993	Austin	United States	Frank Erwin Center
17 October 1993	St. Louis	United States	St. Louis Arena
20 October 1993	Champaign	United States	Assembly Hall
22 October 1993	Auburn Hills	United States	The Palace of Auburn Hills
23 October 1993	Auburn Hills	United States	The Palace of Auburn Hills
26 October 1993	Richfield Township	United States	Coliseum at Richfield
28 October 1993	Rosemont	United States	Rosemont Horizon
29 October 1993	Rosemont	United States	Rosemont Horizon
30 October 1993	Minneapolis	United States	Target Center
2 November 1993	Denver	United States	McNichols Sports Arena
4 November 1993	Salt Lake City	United States	Delta Center
6 November 1993	Vancouver	Canada	Pacific Coliseum
7 November 1993	Seattle	United States	Seattle Center Coliseum
8 November 1993	Portland	United States	Memorial Coliseum
12 November 1993	San Jose	United States	San Jose Arena
13 November 1993	Oakland	United States	Oakland–Alameda County Coliseum Arena
14 November 1993	Sacramento	United States	ARCO Arena
16 November 1993	San Diego	United States	San Diego Sports Arena
18 November 1993	Phoenix	United States	Arizona Veterans Memorial Coliseum
20 November 1993	Inglewood	United States	Great Western Forum
21 November 1993	Inglewood	United States	Great Western Forum
23 November 1993	Inglewood	United States	Great Western Forum
24 November 1993	Inglewood	United States	Great Western Forum
26 November 1993	Inglewood	United States	Great Western Forum
2 December 1993	Mexico City	Mexico	Palacio de los Deportes
3 December 1993	Mexico City	Mexico	Palacio de los Deportes
Europe
12 December 1993	Dublin	Ireland	Point Theatre
14 December 1993	Birmingham	England	NEC Arena
17 December 1993	Manchester	England	Greater Manchester Exhibition Centre
18 December 1993	Sheffield	England	Sheffield Arena
20 December 1993	London	England	Wembley Arena

=== Exotic/Summer '94 leg ===
Date	City	Country	Venue
9 February 1994	Johannesburg	South Africa	Standard Bank Arena
11 February 1994	Johannesburg	South Africa	Standard Bank Arena
12 February 1994	Johannesburg	South Africa	Standard Bank Arena
14 February 1994	Johannesburg	South Africa	Standard Bank Arena
15 February 1994	Johannesburg	South Africa	Standard Bank Arena
18 February 1994	Cape Town	South Africa	Good Hope Centre
19 February 1994	Cape Town	South Africa	Good Hope Centre
23 February 1994	Durban	South Africa	ICC Durban Arena
25 February 1994	Johannesburg	South Africa	Standard Bank Arena
26 February 1994	Johannesburg	South Africa	Standard Bank Arena
1 March 1994	Singapore		Singapore Indoor Stadium
5 March 1994	Perth	Australia	Perth Entertainment Centre
7 March 1994	Adelaide	Australia	Thebarton Theatre
8 March 1994	Melbourne	Australia	Rod Laver Arena
10 March 1994	Brisbane	Australia	Brisbane Festival Hall
12 March 1994	Sydney	Australia	Sydney Entertainment Centre
16 March 1994	Hong Kong	British Colony	Hong Kong Stadium
18 March 1994	Manila	Philippines	Folk Arts Theater
19 March 1994	Manila	Philippines	Folk Arts Theater
25 March 1994	Honolulu	United States	Blaisdell Arena
26 March 1994	Honolulu	United States	Blaisdell Arena
4 April 1994	São Paulo	Brazil	Olímpia
5 April 1994	São Paulo	Brazil	Olímpia
8 April 1994	Buenos Aires	Argentina	José Amalfitani Stadium
10 April 1994	Santiago	Chile	Estadio Nacional de Chile
14 April 1994	San José	Costa Rica	Gimnasio Nacional
16 April 1994	Monterrey	Mexico	Auditorio Fundidora
12 May 1994	Sacramento	United States	Cal Expo Amphitheater
14 May 1994	Mountain View	United States	Shoreline Amphitheatre
15 May 1994	Concord	United States	Concord Pavilion
17 May 1994	Las Vegas	United States	Aladdin Theatre for the Performing Arts
18 May 1994	Phoenix	United States	Desert Sky Pavilion
20 May 1994	Irvine	United States	Irvine Meadows Amphitheatre
21 May 1994	San Bernardino	United States	Blockbuster Pavilion
24 May 1994	Park City	United States	Park West Amphitheatre
28 May 1994	Bonner Springs	United States	Sandstone Amphitheater
29 May 1994	Maryland Heights	United States	Riverport Amphitheatre
31 May 1994	San Antonio	United States	Hemisfair Arena
1 June 1994	The Woodlands	United States	Cynthia Woods Mitchell Pavilion
3 June 1994	Dallas	United States	Coca-Cola Starplex Amphitheatre
5 June 1994	Biloxi	United States	Mississippi Coast Coliseum
8 June 1994	Charlotte	United States	Carowinds Palladium
9 June 1994	Atlanta	United States	Coca-Cola Lakewood Amphitheatre
11 June 1994	Tinley Park	United States	World Music Theatre
12 June 1994	Cuyahoga Falls	United States	Blossom Music Center
14 June 1994	Columbia	United States	Merriweather Post Pavilion
16 June 1994	Wantagh	United States	Jones Beach Amphitheater
17 June 1994	Wantagh	United States	Jones Beach Amphitheater
20 June 1994	Vaughan	Canada	Kingswood Music Theatre
21 June 1994	Montreal	Canada	Montreal Forum
23 June 1994	Mansfield	United States	Great Woods Performing Arts Center
24 June 1994	Holmdel Township	United States	Garden State Arts Center
28 June 1994	Philadelphia	United States	The Spectrum
29 June 1994	Burgettstown	United States	Star Lake Amphitheatre
1 July 1994	Columbus	United States	Polaris Amphitheater
3 July 1994	Clarkston	United States	Pine Knob Music Theatre
4 July 1994	Clarkston	United States	Pine Knob Music Theatre
6 July 1994	Cincinnati	United States	Riverbend Music Center
7 July 1994	Milwaukee	United States	Marcus Amphitheater
8 July 1994	Noblesville	United States	Deer Creek Music Center

== Musicians ==
=== Depeche Mode ===
- Dave Gahan – lead vocals
- Martin Gore – guitar, synthesisers, samplers, lead and backing vocals
- Alan Wilder – synthesisers, samplers, piano, drums, percussion pads, backing vocals
- Andy Fletcher – synthesisers, samplers, backing vocals (through March 1994)

=== Additional musicians ===
- Daryl Bamonte – synthesizers, samplers (substituting for Andrew Fletcher during April–July 1994 dates)
- Hildia Campbell – backing vocals
- Samantha Smith – backing vocals

== Production staff ==
- Production Manager – Craig Sherwood
- Production Manager – Andy Franks
- Stage Manager – Howard Hopkins
- Stage Manager – Tom Wilson
- Rigger – Phil Broad
- Wardrobe – Carol Graham
- Wardrobe – Paula Bradley
- Keyboard Tech – Wob Roberts
- Guitar Tech – Jez Webb
- Drum Technician – Tom Wilson
- FOH Sound Engineer – Jon Lemon
- Sound Crew Chief – Dave Bracey
- Sound Crew – Scott Ashton
- Video/Projection – Richard Turner
- Lighting Designer – Patrick Woodroffe
- Stage Design & Concept – Anton Corbijn
