= Hanns-Martin-Schleyer-Halle =

Indoor arena in Stuttgart, Germany

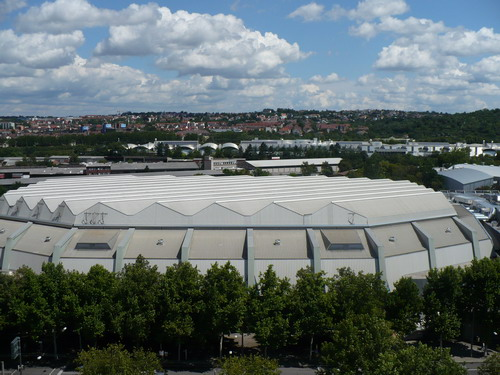
- Interactive map of Hanns-Martin-Schleyer-Halle
- Address: Mercedesstraße 69; 70372 Stuttgart, Germany
- Location: Wasen
- Coordinates: 48°47′38″N 9°13′37″E
- Operator: in.Stuttgart Veranstaltungsgesellschaft GmbH
- Capacity: 14,937
- Field size: 286 m (313 yd) cycling track

Construction
- Opened: 14 September 1983
- Renovated: 2005–06

Website
- Venue Website

Hanns-Martin-Schleyer-Halle (sometimes shortened to Schleyer-Halle) is an indoor arena located in Stuttgart, Germany. The capacity of the arena is nearly 15,000 people. The venue was built in 1983 and is named for Hanns Martin Schleyer, a German former Nazi SS officer and employer representative, who was kidnapped and killed by the terrorist group Red Army Faction. It has a 285,714-metre (937,382 ft) track made of wood.

== Sporting events ==
The arena hosted the final phase of the 1985 European basketball championship.

In tennis, the arena hosts some of the matches of Porsche Tennis Grand Prix, on a clay court designated as "Court 1". It also hosted the Stuttgart Masters when it was an ATP Super 9 event between 1996 and 2001.

The arena is also used as a velodrome and was used as the host for the 2003 UCI Track Cycling World Championships.

The 1989 World Artistic Gymnastics Championships, the 2007 World Artistic Gymnastics Championships, and the 2019 World Artistic Gymnastics Championships were held at the Hanns-Martin-Schleyer-Hall.

== Concerts ==
Depeche Mode performed at the stadium seven times: the first occasion being 2 November 1987, during their Music for the Masses Tour. The second was on 15 October 1990, during their World Violation Tour. The third was on 25 June 1993, during their Devotional Tour. The fourth was on 23 September 1998, during their Singles Tour. The fifth was on 3 October 2001, during their Exciter Tour. The sixth was on 9 March 2006, during their Touring the Angel. The seventh was on 8 November 2009, during their Tour of the Universe. On 11 April 2002, Irish vocal pop band Westlife held a concert for their World of Our Own Tour supporting their album World of Our Own. In July 2009 Elton John gave a sold-out concert in the Schleyerhalle. Slayer played their final European Show at the Schleyerhalle on 3 August 2019 on their farewell world tour.

American icon Beyoncé performed three times at the venue. Two times as part of Destiny's Child in 2002 and 2005, and once in 2007 as a solo act during The Beyoncé Experience.

The casts of Disney's Violetta and Soy Luna performed at the arena in 2015 and 2018, respectively, as part of their European tours, the Violetta Live International Tour and Soy Luna Live.

== See also ==
- List of indoor arenas in Germany

| Preceded by Palais des Sports de Beaulieu; Nantes | FIBA EuroBasket; Final Venue; 1985 | Succeeded by Peace and Friendship Stadium; Athens |
| Preceded by Scandinavium; Gothenburg | Davis Cup; Final Venue; 1989 | Succeeded by Suncoast Dome; St. Petersburg |
| Preceded by Green Dome Maebashi; Maebashi | UCI Track Cycling World Championships; Venue; 1991 | Succeeded by Luis Puig Velodrome; Valencia |
| Preceded by Siemens Arena; Ballerup | UCI Track Cycling World Championships; Venue; 2003 | Succeeded by Melbourne Arena; Melbourne |
