= I Feel You =

1993 single by Depeche Mode

Single by Depeche Mode

from the album Songs of Faith and Devotion
- B-side: "One Caress"
- Released: 9 February 1993
- Recorded: 1992
- Studio: Madrid; Château du Pape (Hamburg); Olympic (London)
- Genre: Alternative rock; synth-rock; blues rock
- Length: 4:35 (album version); 4:27 (intro edit)
- Label: Mute
- Songwriter: Martin Gore
- Producers: Depeche Mode; Flood

Depeche Mode singles chronology
"World in My Eyes" (1990)	"I Feel You" (1993)	"Walking in My Shoes" (1993)

Music video
- "I Feel You" on YouTube

"I Feel You" is a song by the English electronic music band Depeche Mode, released on 9 February 1993 as the first single from their eighth studio album, Songs of Faith and Devotion (1993). The song was written by Martin Gore and produced by the band with Flood. It peaked at number eight on the UK Singles Chart and also made number one and number three on the US Billboard Modern Rock Tracks chart and the Billboard Dance Club Play chart respectively. It is one of the band's highest-charting singles worldwide. The accompanying music video, directed by Anton Corbijn was nominated for both an MTV Music Awards as well as a Brit Award.

== Background and recording ==
Depeche Mode had taken time off after their successful album Violator and supporting World Violation Tour in 1990. In 1992, the band reconvened near Madrid, Spain, to record material for their new album. Songwriter Martin Gore brought a demo of "I Feel You" to the Madrid sessions, which delighted singer Dave Gahan, who was looking to do something "bluesier" and "rockier" than they had done before.

Band member Alan Wilder played live drums for the track, which were then sampled and replayed for the song. Said Wilder of the drums,

I went in and played drums along with the track in one particular style, then did it again in a funkier style, and so on. ... We set up a studio in the basement. The two drum kits – the smaller and the larger one – were recorded in different spaces, which gave each a different kind of edge. Plus, they were played in very different ways. Most of them were sampled and then sequenced in the form of drum loops. ... There's a series of loops, which are sequenced together ... in a different structure from how they were originally performed. At the beginning of 'I Feel You' the drum kit is played, sampled, put through a synth, distorted, and then reduced to half-level."

Lyrically, Wilder felt that the song uplifting, saying "I don't agree at all that Songs of Faith and Devotion is a dark album – it's the only Depeche Mode album that leaves you feeling uplifted. 'I Feel You', for example ... [has] an overriding sense of optimism."

== Release and promotion ==
The band all agreed to release the song as the lead-off single for the album, with Wilder saying "the track had attitude and was radically different to what we had done before. We hoped it would surprise people and make them curious about the rest of the album."

The single was released first in the US on 9 February 1993, and then six days later in the UK, representing the first time a Depeche Mode single was released in the US before the UK. Mute Records released the single in the UK on several formats: a 7-inch vinyl single with catalogue number 7BONG21, a 12-inch vinyl single (12BONG21), a limited edition 12-inch single (L12BONG21), and as a promotional 12-inch, P12BONG21. Remixes for the song were created by Brian Eno, Renegade Soundwave, Mark Stent, and John Crossley.

On the album, the track was sequenced as the first song, before "Walking in My Shoes", a position Wilder had to fight with the band to get them agree to. The single also included the album track "One Caress". Within two weeks of its release, the single reached number eight on the UK singles chart.

== Critical reception ==
Professional ratings
Review scores
Source	Rating
AllMusic	4.5/5 stars

In his weekly UK chart commentary, James Masterton wrote, "In a similar vein to 'Personal Jesus' the track may not have quite the momentum to go Top 3 and is unlikely to win them any new fans." David Quantick from NME viewed it as "a song which takes INXS's arena bluster and turns it into a dark and mean glitter stomp." Sam Wood from Philadelphia Inquirer described it as "a screeching blast of hellish white noise. A claustrophobic electro-blues shackled to a two-note guitar figure, 'I Feel You' trumpets the onrush of a terrifying mystical experience." Andrew Harrison from Select noted the "easy brutality" and "raging noise" that opens the track.

In 2017, Billboard magazine included "I Feel You" on their list of Top 20 Depeche Mode songs, placing the song at number eleven.

== Music video ==
The black-and-white music video for "I Feel You" was directed by Dutch photographer, film director and music video director Anton Corbijn and was the first time fans of Depeche Mode were shown Gahan's new look, with long hair, tattoos and a goatee. The woman in the video is English actress Lysette Anthony. In September 1993, "I Feel You" was nominated in the MTV Video Music Awards, and in the UK it was nominated for the 1993 Brit Awards, although it failed to win either.

There is also a music video for "One Caress", directed by Kevin Kerslake, that was filmed during one of the off-days of the Devotional Tour in the US. The videos for "I Feel You" and "One Caress" appeared on subsequent Depeche Mode video compilations, including The Videos 86–98 (1998 for "I Feel You", 2002 re-release for "One Caress") and Video Singles Collection (2016).

== Live performances ==
"I Feel You" has been played on nearly every Depeche Mode tour since 1993, including the 1993–94 Devotional Tour, the 2001 Exciter Tour, the 2005–06 Touring the Angel tour, the 2009–10 Tour of the Universe, the 2013–14 Delta Machine Tour, the 2018–19 Global Spirit Tour and the 2023–24 Memento Mori World Tour. Performances from these tours were released on Devotional (1993), One Night in Paris (2002), Touring the Angel: Live in Milan (2006), Tour of the Universe: Barcelona 20/21.11.09 (2010), Live in Berlin (2014), and Depeche Mode: M (2025), with only the 1998 Singles Tour and the Global Spirit Tour not seeing an official live release of the song.

== Other appearances ==
The song appeared in its album or remixed form on various Depeche Mode compilation albums, including The Singles 86–98 (1998), Remixes 81–04 (2004), The Best of Depeche Mode Volume 1 (2006), and Remixes 2: 81–11 (2011).

== Track listings ==
- UK 7-inch and cassette single
1. "I Feel You" – 4:34
2. "One Caress" – 3:30
- UK 12-inch single

A1. "I Feel You" (Throb mix) – 6:47
A2. "I Feel You" (seven inch mix) – 4:34
B1. "I Feel You" (Babylon mix) – 7:53
B2. "One Caress" – 3:30

- UK limited-edition 12-inch and CD single
1. "I Feel You" (Life's Too Short mix) – 8:35
2. "I Feel You" (Swamp mix) – 7:28
3. "I Feel You" (Renegade Soundwave Afghan Surgery mix) – 4:58
4. "I Feel You" (Helmet at the Helm mix) – 6:41
- UK and Japanese CD single
1. "I Feel You" (seven inch mix) – 4:34
2. "One Caress" – 3:30
3. "I Feel You" (Throb mix) – 6:47
4. "I Feel You" (Babylon mix) – 7:53
- US 12-inch and maxi-cassette single

A1. "I Feel You" (Babylon mix) – 7:53
A2. "I Feel You" (Helmet at the Helm mix) – 6:41
A3. "I Feel You" (Afghan Surgery mix) – 4:58
A4. "One Caress" (album version) – 3:31
B1. "I Feel You" (Life's Too Short mix) – 8:33
B2. "I Feel You" (Swamp mix) – 7:26
B3. "I Feel You" (Throb mix) – 6:47

- US maxi-CD single 1
1. "I Feel You" (single mix) – 4:35
2. "One Caress" (album version) – 3:31
3. "I Feel You" (Throb mix) – 6:47
4. "I Feel You" (Babylon mix) – 7:53
- US maxi-CD single 2
1. "I Feel You" (Life's Too Short mix) – 8:33
2. "I Feel You" (Swamp mix) – 7:26
3. "I Feel You" (Afghan Surgery mix) – 4:58
4. "I Feel You" (Helmet at the Helm mix) – 6:41

The "Life's Too Short" mix and the "Swamp" mix are by Brian Eno; the "Throb" mix and the "Helmet at the Helm" mix are by Mike Stent; the "Babylon" mix is by John Crossley and Supereal; and the "Afghan Surgery" mix is by Danny Briottet and Renegade Soundwave.

== Charts ==
=== Weekly charts ===
Chart (1993)	Peak position
Australia (ARIA)	37
Austria (Ö3 Austria Top 40)	7
Belgium (Ultratop 50 Flanders)	21
Canada Retail Singles (The Record)	4
Canada Top Singles (RPM)	31
Denmark (IFPI)	2
Europe (Eurochart Hot 100)	2
Europe (European Hit Radio)	10
Finland (Suomen virallinen lista)	1
France (SNEP)	5
Germany (GfK)	4
Greece (Pop + Rock)	1
Iceland (Íslenski Listinn Topp 40)	18
Ireland (IRMA)	6
Italy (Musica e dischi)	3
Netherlands (Dutch Top 40)	35
Netherlands (Single Top 100)	39
New Zealand (Recorded Music NZ)	29
Portugal (AFP)	7
Spain (AFYVE)	1
Sweden (Sverigetopplistan)	2
Switzerland (Schweizer Hitparade)	4
UK Singles (Official Charts)	8
UK Airplay (Music Week)	11
UK Indie (Music Week)	1
US Billboard Hot 100	37
US Alternative Airplay (Billboard)	1
US Dance Club Songs (Billboard)	3
US Dance Singles Sales (Billboard)	4
US Cash Box Top 100	37

=== Year-end charts ===
Chart (1993)	Position
Europe (Eurochart Hot 100)	20
Germany (Media Control)	40
Sweden (Topplistan)	33
US Modern Rock Tracks (Billboard)	13

== Certifications ==
Region	Certification	Certified units/sales
United States (RIAA)	Gold	500,000^{^}
^{^} Shipments figures based on certification alone.

== Release history ==
Region	Date	Format(s)	Label(s)	Ref.
United States	9 February 1993	—N/a	Sire; Reprise	
United Kingdom	15 February 1993	7-inch vinyl; CD; cassette	Mute	
Japan	21 February 1993	CD	Mute	
Australia	28 February 1993	CD; cassette	Liberation; Mute	
Australia	21 March 1993	12-inch vinyl	Liberation; Mute	
Australia	5 April 1993	CD	Liberation; Mute	

== See also ==
- List of number-one singles of 1993 (Finland)
- List of number-one singles of 1993 (Spain)
- Number one modern rock hits of 1993
