= Credit Union 1 Amphitheatre =

Outdoor music venue in Illinois, U.S.

Coordinates: 41°32′38.52″N 87°46′33.55″W

- Interactive map of Credit Union 1 Amphitheatre
- Former names: World Music Theatre (1990–1995); New World Music Theatre (1995–2001); Tweeter Center (2001–2006); First Midwest Bank Amphitheatre (2006–2015); Hollywood Casino Amphitheatre (2015–2023)
- Address: 19100 Ridgeland Ave.
- Location: Tinley Park, Illinois
- Owner: Live Nation
- Seating type: Reserved, Lawn
- Capacity: 28,739
- Type: outdoor Amphitheatre

Construction
- Opened: June 2, 1990

Website
- www.livenation.com

Credit Union 1 Amphitheatre (originally World Music Theatre and formerly New World Music Theatre, Tweeter Center, First Midwest Bank Amphitheatre and Hollywood Casino Amphitheatre) is an outdoor music venue located in Tinley Park, Illinois, that opened in 1990 and was built by Gierczyk Development. It is one of the largest music venues in the Chicago area, with a capacity of up to 28,000 spectators: 11,000 reserved seats and 17,000 lawn seats.

Nederlander Concerts and Jam Productions co-managed the venue from 1994 to 1999.

Hollywood Casino acquired the naming rights, beginning in 2015. The venue is owned by Live Nation.

On April 25, 2023, Credit Union 1 bought the naming rights for the former Hollywood Casino Amphitheater, now known as the Credit Union 1 Amphitheater, in Tinley Park, Illinois.

== Concerts and music festivals ==
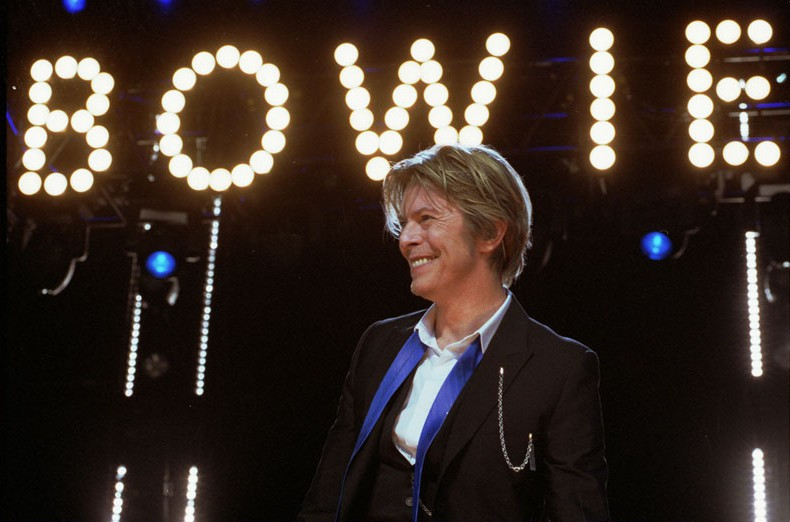
David Bowie at the then Tweeter Center in August 2002

The venue has hosted many concerts and music festivals, including All That! Music and More Festival, Anger Management Tour, Area Festival, B96 Pepsi SummerBash, Crüe Fest, Crüe Fest 2, Curiosa Festival, Family Values Tour, Farm Aid, Furthur Festival, Gigantour, The Grateful Dead, H.O.R.D.E. Festival, Honda Civic Tour, Lilith Fair, Lollapalooza, Mayhem Festival, Ozzfest, Projekt Revolution, Rock the Bells Festival, Uproar Festival, Vans Warped Tour and WKQX Q101.1's Jamboree.

Cher was the first entertainer to perform at the venue, as part of her Heart of Stone Tour, on June 2, 1990.

Kiss headlined the venue's second day of operation on their Hot in The Shade Tour on June 3, 1990.

Depeche Mode performed two consecutive shows during their World Violation Tour on July 2–3, 1990, with Nitzer Ebb as their opening act. Live footage shot by longtime collaborator Anton Corbijn was used for the official music video to their song "World in My Eyes".

The Grateful Dead show on July 23, 1990, was the last show that keyboard player Brent Mydland played before his death three days later.

Whitney Houston performed at the venue during her I'm Your Baby Tonight World Tour on June 30, 1991.

Bon Jovi played at the venue during their I'll Sleep When I'm Dead Tour on July 24, 1993, and as part of their These Days Tour on August 12, 1995.

The Spice Girls performed a sold-out show on July 27, 1998, as part of their Spiceworld Tour.

Bob Dylan and Paul Simon performed here during their Never Ending Tour on July 9, 1999.

Britney Spears performed to a sold out crowd on her Oops!... I Did It Again World Tour on July 7th, 2000.

Phish performed during their Rift Tour on August 14, 1993, the show was recorded and later released, as Live Phish Volume 7, on April 16, 2002.

Rush performed during their Test for Echo Tour on June 14, 1997. Much of this show was featured on their live album, entitled Different Stages, released on November 10, 1998.

Disturbed performed during Q101.1's 2001 Jamboree; they used live footage of their song "Down with the Sickness" for its official music video.

Fall Out Boy and Paramore performed during their co-headlining Monumentour on July 11, 2014, with New Politics as their opening act. Paramore used live footage from this show in the music video for their new song "Last Hope". Fall Out Boy returned on July 11, 2015, this time on tour with rapper Wiz Khalifa.

Paul McCartney performed at the venue during his One on One tour on July 25 and 26, 2017. The July 26 performance was attended by Tinley Park mayor Jacob Vandenberg, who received criticism afterwards for interfering with police officers directing traffic to give his party bus preferential treatment while exiting the venue. Vandenberg later apologized for the incident.

AJR performed at the venue on June 3, 2022, for their tour supporting their album "OK Orchestra".

Janet Jackson performed on May 27, 2023, on her Together Again tour with opening act Ludacris.

== See also ==
- List of contemporary amphitheatres
- Live Nation
- Credit Union 1 Arena
