= Strange Too =

Video by Depeche Mode
- Released: 22 October 1990
- Recorded: 1989–1990
- Length: 31:56
- Labels: Mute; Sire; Reprise
- Director: Anton Corbijn
- Producer: Richard Bell

Depeche Mode chronology
101 (1989)	Strange Too (1990)	Devotional (1993)

Professional ratings
Review scores
Source	Rating
AllMusic	2/5 stars

Strange Too – Another Violation by Anton Corbijn is the third music video compilation by the English electronic music band Depeche Mode, featuring more videos directed by Anton Corbijn, released in 1990.

== Background ==
The Dutch artist Anton Corbijn had been responsible of all of Depeche Mode's music videos since their 1986 video for A Question of Time. For their album Violator (1990), Corbijn shot a total of six music videos, four for the album's singles, and two additional videos for album tracks "Clean" and "Halo".

Corbijn shot all six videos in Super 8. The taller woman in the "Halo" video is a young Jenna Elfman. The drive-in featured in the introduction to the compilation is the Motor Vu drive-in, located in Erda, Utah, west of Salt Lake City, near the town of Tooele. This part of the video was shot the day after the band's concert in Salt Lake City in July 1990.

== Release ==
Strange Too was released on 22 October 1990 by Mute Records in the UK on VHS tape, with catalogue number 790468.

Strange Too and its predecessor, Strange, were re-released on DVD and Blu-ray on 8 December 2023.

== Track listing ==
1. "Personal Jesus"
2. "Policy of Truth"
3. "Enjoy the Silence"
4. "Clean"
5. "Halo"
6. "World in My Eyes"
- All tracks are written by Martin L. Gore
- All videos are directed by Anton Corbijn

== Charts ==
Chart performance for Strange Too
Chart (1990–1991)	Peak position
Canada Long Form Music Videos (RPM)	4
UK Music Video Chart	12

== Certifications and sales ==
Certifications and sales for Strange Too
Region	Certification	Certified units/sales
United States (RIAA)	Platinum	100,000^{^}
^{^} Shipments figures based on certification alone.
