= The Singles 86–98 =

1998 greatest hits album by Depeche Mode

The Singles 86>98

Greatest hits album by Depeche Mode
- Released: 28 September 1998
- Recorded: 1985–1998
- Length: 97:12
- Label: Mute
- Producer: Dave Bascombe; Depeche Mode; Flood; Gareth Jones; Daniel Miller; Tim Simenon; Butch Vig; Alan Wilder
- Compiler: Roland Brown; Mike Marsh

Depeche Mode chronology
Ultra (1997)	The Singles 86>98 (1998)	Exciter (2001)

Singles from The Singles 86>98
- 1. "Only When I Lose Myself" Released: 7 September 1998

Professional ratings
Review scores
Source	Rating
AllMusic	5/5 stars
The Encyclopedia of Popular Music	4/5 stars
Entertainment Weekly	C−
NME	6/10
Pitchfork	7.6/10
The Rolling Stone Album Guide	5/5 stars
Spin	8/10

The Singles 86>98 is a greatest hits album by the English electronic music band Depeche Mode, released on 28 September 1998 by Mute Records. It serves as a follow-up to the band's previous compilation, The Singles 81→85, which was also reissued in the same year. The compilation covers the band's seven-inch single releases spanning five studio albums (from 1986's Black Celebration to 1997's Ultra), while including the new song "Only When I Lose Myself". It also includes "Little 15" from Music for the Masses, which was released as a single in France only, but charted in the UK based on import sales, and the live version of "Everything Counts" from the live album 101, which was released as a single in 1989. All the tracks on The Singles 86>98 were newly remastered, as was the case with the re-release of The Singles 81→85.

The band decided to release the album as a close follow-up to Ultra, Depeche Mode's first studio album after Alan Wilder's departure and Dave Gahan's drug addiction and resulting health problems, to maintain interest in the band. The four-month The Singles Tour that followed marked the first time Depeche Mode had toured since the 1993–1994 Devotional/Exotic Tour, since they had declined to tour Ultra a year earlier, playing only a few songs at a handful of shows instead.

The Singles 86>98 has sold 500,000 units in the United States (double albums count as two units), achieving platinum certification. The album was also listed on Blender magazine's "500 CDs You Must Own: Alternative Rock" list.

== Tour ==
The tour began with a European leg, kicking off in Tartu, Estonia, in early September 1998 and culminating in San Sebastián, Spain, in mid-October. Later in the month, the band commenced a tour of North America, beginning in Worcester, Massachusetts. The eight-week jaunt included an appearance at the KROQ Almost Acoustic Christmas concert in Los Angeles. Billy Corgan, lead singer of the Smashing Pumpkins, performed the song "Never Let Me Down Again" with Depeche Mode at this concert. The tour eventually wrapped up in Anaheim, California, in late December.

The tour marked the debut of the two group's backing musicians: keyboardist Peter Gordeno, who replaced Wilder, and drummer Christian Eigner, who previously performed with the band in 1997 for two Ultra Parties concerts.

== The Videos 86>98 ==
To coincide with the release of The Singles 86>98, the band released a VHS/DVD called The Videos 86>98 featuring the music videos for all of the songs, and more. In 2002, the DVD was re-released as Videos 86>98 +, which included more videos and bonus material.

== The Singles 81>98 ==
In 2001, The Singles 86>98 and the 1998 version of The Singles 81>85 were made available together in one box set called The Singles 81>98 (under the LCD MUTE L5 catalogue number).

== Track listing ==
All tracks are written by Martin Gore.

Disc one
No.	Title	Original album	Length
1.	"Stripped" (7" edit)	Black Celebration	3:51
2.	"A Question of Lust" (7" edit)	Black Celebration	4:31
3.	"A Question of Time" (7" remix)	Black Celebration	4:00
4.	"Strangelove" (7" remix)	Music for the Masses	3:47
5.	"Never Let Me Down Again" (7" edit)	Music for the Masses	4:22
6.	"Behind the Wheel" (7" remix)	Music for the Masses	4:00
7.	"Personal Jesus" (7" edit)	Violator	3:46
8.	"Enjoy the Silence" (single version)	Violator	4:16
9.	"Policy of Truth" (single version)	Violator	5:14
10.	"World in My Eyes" (single edit)	Violator	3:57

Disc two
No.	Title	Original album	Length
1.	"I Feel You"	Songs of Faith and Devotion	4:35
2.	"Walking in My Shoes" (single remix)	Songs of Faith and Devotion	5:02
3.	"Condemnation" (Paris mix)	Songs of Faith and Devotion	3:23
4.	"In Your Room" (Zephyr mix)	Songs of Faith and Devotion	4:50
5.	"Barrel of a Gun"	Ultra	5:26
6.	"It's No Good"	Ultra	5:59
7.	"Home"	Ultra	5:46
8.	"Useless" (remix)	Ultra	4:53
9.	"Only When I Lose Myself"	Previously unreleased	4:41
10.	"Little 15"	Music for the Masses	4:14
11.	"Everything Counts" (live)	101	6:38

Disc three (US limited edition only)
No.	Title	Length
1.	"Rush" (Wild Planet mix)	6:23
2.	"Enjoy the Silence" (The Quad: Final mix)	15:25
3.	"World in My Eyes" (Safar mix)	8:30
4.	"Dangerous" (Hazchemix edit)	3:02

== Personnel ==
Credits adapted from the liner notes of The Singles 86>98.

=== Depeche Mode ===
- Alan Wilder
- Dave Gahan – lead vocals (disc 1: tracks 1, 3–10; disc 2: 1–6, 8–11)
- Martin Gore – lead vocals (disc 1: track 2; disc 2: track 7)
- Andy Fletcher

=== Technical ===
- Depeche Mode – production (disc 1: all tracks; disc 2: 1–4, 10, 11); mixing (disc 1: track 10; disc 2: tracks 1, 2)
- Daniel Miller – production (disc 1: tracks 1–3, 5, 8; disc 2: track 10)
- Gareth Jones – production (disc 1: tracks 1–3)
- Phil Harding – remix (disc 1: track 3)
- Dave Bascombe – production (disc 1, tracks 4–6; disc 2, track 10)
- Shep Pettibone – remix (disc 1: track 6)
- Flood – production (disc 1: tracks 7–10; disc 2: tracks 1–4)
- François Kevorkian – mixing (disc 1: tracks 7, 9, 10)
- Phil Legg – mixing (disc 1: track 8)
- Mark Stent – mixing (disc 2: tracks 1, 2)
- Alan Wilder – additional production, remix (disc 2: track 3)
- Steve Lyon – additional production, remix (disc 2: track 3)
- Butch Vig – additional production, remix (disc 2: track 4)
- Tim Simenon – production (disc 2: tracks 5–9); mixing (disc 2: tracks 5–7, 9)
- Q – mixing (disc 2: tracks 5–7)
- Alan Moulder – remix (disc 2: track 8)
- Mike Marsh – compiling, remastering
- Roland Brown – compiling, remastering

=== Artwork ===
- Anna Bergfors (Note: Credited as Mat Cook) – concept, art direction
- Rick Guest – sleeve photography
- Elaine Macintosh – stills production
- Lee Collins – photo shoot technician
- P.A. Taylor – photo shoot technician
- Anton Corbijn – Depeche Mode 86 photograph (taken from "A Question of Time" video)
- Marina Chavez – Depeche Mode 98 photograph

== Charts ==
=== Weekly charts ===
Weekly chart performance for The Singles 86>98
Chart (1998)	Peak position
Australian Albums (ARIA)	42
Austrian Albums (Ö3 Austria)	2
Belgian Albums (Ultratop Flanders)	7
Belgian Albums (Ultratop Wallonia)	4
Canadian Albums (Billboard)	14
Czech Albums (ČNS IFPI)	5
Danish Albums (Hitlisten)	4
Dutch Albums (Album Top 100)	33
European Albums (Music & Media)	1
Finnish Albums (Suomen virallinen lista)	3
French Compilation Albums (SNEP)	6
German Albums (Offizielle Top 100)	1
Greek Albums (IFPI)	3
Hungarian Albums (MAHASZ)	8
Irish Albums (IRMA)	6
Italian Albums (FIMI)	2
Norwegian Albums (VG-lista)	9
Portuguese Albums (AFP)	10
Scottish Albums (OCC)	15
Spanish Albums (AFYVE)	8
Swedish Albums (Sverigetopplistan)	1
Swiss Albums (Schweizer Hitparade)	3
UK Albums (OCC)	5
UK Independent Albums (OCC)	1
US Billboard 200	38

=== Year-end charts ===
Year-end chart performance for The Singles 86>98
Chart (1998)	Position
Belgian Albums (Ultratop Flanders)	92
Belgian Albums (Ultratop Wallonia)	31
European Albums (Music & Media)	31
German Albums (Offizielle Top 100)	21
Swedish Albums & Compilations (Sverigetopplistan)	34

== Certifications ==
Certifications and sales for The Singles 86>98
Region	Certification	Certified units/sales
Belgium (BRMA)	Gold	25,000^{*}
France (SNEP)	2× Gold	200,000^{*}
Germany (BVMI)	Platinum	500,000^{^}
Italy (FIMI) Sales since 2009	Gold	25,000^{‡}
Netherlands (NVPI)	Gold	50,000^{^}
Poland (ZPAV)	Gold	50,000^{*}
Portugal (AFP)	Gold	20,000^{^}
Spain (Promusicae)	Gold	50,000^{^}
Sweden (GLF)	Gold	40,000^{^}
Switzerland (IFPI Switzerland)	Gold	25,000^{^}
United Kingdom (BPI)	Gold	100,000^{^}
United States (RIAA)	Platinum	500,000^{^}
Summaries
Europe (IFPI)	Platinum	1,000,000^{*}
^{*} Sales figures based on certification alone.^{^} Shipments figures based on certification alone.^{‡} Sales+streaming figures based on certification alone.
