= Condemnation (song) =

1993 single by Depeche Mode

Single by Depeche Mode

from the album Songs of Faith and Devotion
- B-side: "Death's Door" (Jazz mix); "Rush" (remixes)
- Released: 13 September 1993
- Studio: Madrid; Château du Pape (Hamburg, Germany); Olympic (London, England)
- Genre: Gospel
- Length: 3:22
- Label: Mute
- Songwriter: Martin Gore
- Producers: Depeche Mode; Flood; Alan Wilder ("Paris Mix" version); Steve Lyon ("Paris Mix" version)

Depeche Mode singles chronology
"Walking in My Shoes" (1993)	"Condemnation" (1993)	"In Your Room" (1994)

Music video
- "Condemnation" on YouTube

Alternative cover
- Cover for the limited edition single

"Condemnation" is a song by the English electronic music band Depeche Mode, released on 13 September 1993 by Mute Records as the third single from the band's eighth studio album, Songs of Faith and Devotion (1993). The song reached No. 9 on the UK Singles Chart, No. 3 in Sweden, and No. 1 in Portugal. Its music video was directed by Anton Corbijn.

The B-sides to the "Condemnation" single are remixes of "Death's Door" and "Rush" plus some live tracks from the Devotional Tour. "Death's Door" is a song from the 1991 Until the End of the World soundtrack. The original version, recorded by Martin Gore and Alan Wilder after the World Violation Tour was over, was exclusive to that album until the 2020s MODE box compilation.

== Background ==
"Condemnation" was written by songwriter Martin Gore. In February 1992, the band convened at a villa near Madrid, Spain, to start the recording sessions for the album, at which time they were presented with the demo for the song. The sessions were fraught with struggles, as lead singer Dave Gahan was struggling with an addiction to heroin, and the rest of the band found themselves frequently at odds.

== Recording ==
Recording for the song began during the Madrid sessions in February 1992. "Condemnation" began with the band jamming together.

Described as "gospel-like", for "Condemnation", Wilder said that "the idea ... was to enhance the gospel feel that the song originally had ... and to try and create the effect of it being played in a room, a space." The early version of the song included all four band members performing in the same space — Fletcher bashing a flight case with a pole, producer Flood and Gahan clapping, Wilder playing a drum and Gore playing an organ. The sound gave the band a direction as to how the track should sound. Sound engineer Steve Lyon remembered that originally, the song was supposed to be sung by Gore, but Gahan convinced Gore to let him sing it instead.

For the final recording, Lyon remembered that Gahan had set up the space with candles, and that "the vibe was good" for recording. Gahan delivered what he thought was the finest vocal performance of his career, despite his struggles with addiction. Said Gahan, "It was done under the studio in Madrid, a low-ceilinged place – very concrete and metal, and echoey and cold, and it had a great sound and a great ambience. When I came out, everybody in the control room went all quiet and turned around, and suddenly Flood said, 'That was fucking great!' And Alan [Wilder] and everybody said, 'That's probably the best vocal you ever did' – and I thought, 'Yeah, it was.' It was completely breaking me up inside, and, at the same time, it was really optimistic and uplifting." He said later of the song that "There are a lot of words in there that were entirely apt to the way I was feeling. And I really felt, for the first time, the words flowing through me as if I had written them."

For the song's backing vocal, the band did not use backing singers. Instead, according to Gore, "It is actually sung in an old gospel quartet style. We basically worked out the parts and sang them – we didn't sample vocals, we just sang the parts like a quartet. So it was very interesting to do that, and I think Dave [Gahan] has given his best vocal performance ever on the track." Band member Alan Wilder said "We did that particular vocal in Madrid, and the house we'd set up the studio in had a very echoey-tiled room, down in the garage."

== Release ==
"Condemnation" was released as the third single from the album on 13 September 1993. In the UK, Mute Records released the single in a pair of commercial formats: a 12-inch single given catalogue number 12BONG23 and a limited edition 12-inch vinyl single (L12BONG23). In addition, a 7-inch vinyl single (BONG23) and two 12-inch vinyl singles (P12BONG23 and PL12BONG23R) were released promotionally. Wilder and Lyon had remixed the song for its 12-inch release at Studio Guillaume Tell in Paris, giving the remix the name "Paris Mix". 12BONG23's B-side were remixes of the album track "Rush" with mixes provided by Jack Dangers and "Death's Door" with a remix by Depeche Mode and Lyon. The B-side of L12BONG23 contained live tracks recorded on the band's then-current Devotional Tour on 15 July 1993 in Madrid, Spain.

In the US, label Sire Records did not want to release "Condemnation" as a single, instead preferring album track "One Caress". To that end, Sire commissioned a video for "One Caress", directed by Kevin Kerslake, and issued "One Caress" on a promotional CD format (catalogue number PRO-CD-6626) before changing their minds and releasing "Condemnation" in the US as a single after all.

== Critical reception ==
Professional ratings
Review scores
Source	Rating
AllMusic	4.5/5 stars

In his weekly UK chart commentary, James Masterton described the song as "a haunting, beautiful ballad of the type they do so well". David Fricke from Melody Maker viewed it as "typical, a song that almost makes it, a sly Anglican gospel take on R.E.M.'s Al Green experiment 'Everybody Hurts' that stumbles basically because Dave Gahan doesn't have the vocal authority to bring it home." On the magazine's single review, music critic Peter Paphides said, "And it's all very anguished, intense and protracted, with lots of gospel singing going on in the background and a bit of real piano, none of your fancy keyboards, and MTV will play it every 10 minutes until the end of the century." Alan Jones from Music Week gave it a score of four out of five, writing, "One of the more atypical singles in Depeche Mode's career, this slow gospel-style song bears a lusty, full force vocal, but a reverential and reserved instrumental track. Subtle and stylish."

Sam Wood from Philadelphia Inquirer noted that the band "appropriates gospel harmonies and the rhythms of Southern slave chants for 'Condemnation', a song that defies the judgment of some unnamed Philistine accuser". Andrew Harrison from Select named it the low point of the album, "with Gahan in the dock for some unspecified crime of the heart and the Mode doing an acceptable deep South spiritual thing, all clanking chains and heartfelt groaning." Tom Doyle from Smash Hits also gave the song four out of five, adding, "You always expect the strangest things to happen in the world of pop, but Depeche Mode going gospel?! The Bizarre thing is, it really works too. Dave Gahan is joined by a gospel choir and the result is quite the best thing since, well, the last Depeche Mode single. Life is weird."

== Music video ==
A music video was produced to promote the single, directed by the Dutch photographer, film director and music video director Anton Corbijn. It was later made available on YouTube in July 2019. The video for "One Caress" was shot "in the freezing cold" in Chicago; the video for "Condemnation" was shot on 29 July 1993 near Budapest. Polish model Basia Milewicz appears in this music video.

Corbijn's music video did not appear on Depeche Mode's music video compilation, The Videos 86>98, in 1998, replaced by the live version from Devotional. The original video eventually was included on the compilation's 2002 re-release (Videos 86>98 +). Both videos appear on the Devotional DVD re-release from 2004, although the live video is not identical to the one in the main Devotional release. Kerslake's video for "One Caress" also appears on the 2002 re-release of Videos 86>98. Both Corbijn's original video and Kerslake's video appear on Video Singles Collection (2006).

== Live performances ==
"Condemnation" was performed on the 1993–94 Devotional Tour and the 2001 Exciter Tour, released on Devotional (1993) and One Night in Paris (2002), respectively.

== Track listings ==
All songs were written by Martin Gore. All live tracks were recorded at The Forum (Milan, Italy) in 1993.

- UK and Japanese CD single
1. "Condemnation" (Paris mix) – 3:21
2. "Death's Door" (Jazz mix) – 6:38
3. "Rush" (Spiritual Guidance mix) – 5:31
4. "Rush" (Amylnitrate mix – instrumental) – 7:43
- UK limited-edition CD and 12-inch single
1. "Condemnation" (live) – 4:10
2. "Personal Jesus" (live) – 6:00
3. "Enjoy the Silence" (live) – 6:46
4. "Halo" (live) – 4:54
- UK 12-inch single

A1. "Condemnation" (Paris mix) – 3:21
A2. "Death's Door" (Jazz mix) – 6:38
B1. "Rush" (Spiritual Guidance mix) – 5:31
B2. "Rush" (Amylnitrate mix – instrumental) – 7:43
B3. "Rush" (Wild Planet mix – vocal) – 6:23

- UK cassette single
1. "Condemnation" (Paris mix) – 3:21
2. "Death's Door" (Jazz mix) – 6:38
- US maxi-CD single
1. "Condemnation" (Paris mix) – 3:22
2. "Rush" (Spiritual Guidance mix) – 5:30
3. "Death's Door" (Jazz mix) – 6:38
4. "Rush" (Nitrate mix) – 7:41
5. "Enjoy the Silence" (live) – 6:47
6. "Halo" (live) – 4:54
7. "Condemnation" (live) – 4:08
- US 12-inch single

A1. "Condemnation" (live) – 4:08
A2. "Enjoy the Silence" (live) – 6:47
A3. "Halo" (live) – 4:54
A4. "Death's Door" (Jazz mix) – 6:38
B1. "Rush" (Spiritual Guidance mix) – 5:30
B2. "Rush" (Nitrate mix) – 7:41
B3. "Rush" (Wild Planet mix) – 6:23
B4. "Condemnation" (Paris mix) – 3:22

- US maxi-cassette single

A1. "Condemnation" (Paris mix) – 3:22
A2. "Enjoy the Silence" (live) – 6:47
A3. "Halo" (live) – 4:54
A4. "Condemnation" (live) – 4:08
B1. "Rush" (Spiritual Guidance mix) – 5:30
B2. "Rush" (Nitrate mix) – 7:41
B3. "Rush" (Wild Planet mix) – 6:23
B4. "Death's Door" (Jazz mix) – 6:38

== Charts ==
=== Weekly charts ===
Chart (1993)	Peak position
Australia (ARIA)	78
Denmark (IFPI)	9
Europe (Eurochart Hot 100)	18
Europe (European Hit Radio)	40
Finland (Suomen virallinen lista)	5
France (SNEP)	36
Germany (GfK)	23
Ireland (IRMA)	19
Italy (Musica e dischi)	21
Portugal (AFP)	1
Spain (AFYVE)	9
Sweden (Sverigetopplistan)	3
Switzerland (Schweizer Hitparade)	38
UK Singles (OCC)	9
UK Airplay (Music Week)	27
US Alternative Airplay (Billboard)	23
US Dance Singles Sales (Billboard)	36

=== Year-end charts ===
Chart (1993)	Position
Sweden (Topplistan)	38

== Release history ==
Region	Date	Format(s)	Label(s)	Ref.
United Kingdom	13 September 1993	12-inch vinyl; CD; cassette	Mute	
Australia	20 September 1993	CD; cassette	Liberation; Mute	
Japan	1 October 1993	CD	Mute	
