= Daryl Bamonte =

British musician

Daryl Bamonte is an English musician, music publisher, record label head and artist manager, known for working for Depeche Mode and the Cure. He is the owner of Archangelo Music, an Ambassador for Europe in Synch, a consultant for Schubert Music Europe, and the keyboardist in Permafrost.

== Depeche Mode ==
Bamonte worked with Depeche Mode early in their career, setting up and taking down equipment for the band. As the band gained success, Bamonte became their road manager. He is credited in the commentary for the 101 documentary as the fifth member of Depeche Mode.

Bamonte worked on various albums with the band, and in various roles. He worked as an assistant on Violator, project manager on Songs of Faith and Devotion album and album co-ordinator on Songs of Faith and Devotion Live.

In 1994, band member Andy Fletcher had to leave the tour due to illness. Bamonte replaced him for the second leg of the 1994 Summer Tour, as well as six shows in South America.

== The Cure ==
After having previously toured with the Cure in the mid-1980s, Bamonte began working with the band again in 1995 alongside his older brother Perry, the band's lead guitarist at the time. Bamonte was a project coordinator on Bloodflowers, Join the Dots, and a number of remastered album reissues. He also served as the executive producer for the Trilogy DVD and the band's 2004 self-titled album alongside Robert Smith. His work with the Cure ended in 2005.

== Compact Space ==
Bamonte was one of three members in the band Compact Space, along with Christian Eigner and Florian Kraemmer. In the band, Bamonte wrote the lyrics, Eigner wrote the music, and Kraemmer assembled the melodies. Their first album Nameless and the Push Push EP were released in June 2011.

== Schubert Music Publishing ==
Bamonte is a consultant for Schubert Music Europe and the head of the Atlantic Curve record label. Since forming in 2020, Atlantic Curve has released albums by artists such as I Like Trains, Laura Carbone, and the Burn album by Lisa Gerrard and Jules Maxwell from Dead Can Dance, which was produced by James Chapman from Maps.

== Executive producer ==
Bamonte was an executive producer for the Cure's live Trilogy film from 2003, and their self-titled album from 2004. He fulfilled the same role for Roger O'Donnell's 2 Ravens album, Lisa Gerrard and Jules Maxwell's Burn album, and Maxwell's Nocturnes album. In 2022, he was executive producer for Exaudia, a collaborative album from Lisa Gerrard and Marcello De Francisci.

== Archangelo Music ==
Bamonte formed Archangelo Music in 2021. The label's first release was Jules Maxwell's Nocturnes album. The album received praise from some of Maxwell's contemporaries such as Roger O'Donnell from the Cure, Lisa Gerrard and Brendan Perry from Dead Can Dance, James Chapman from Maps, and Foy Vance. Archangelo Music also includes Archangelo Songs. As well as Archangelo Recordings, Bamonte has also formed an additional label, Bamala Newtown.

== Europe in Synch ==
Bamonte is also an ambassador for the Europe in Synch organisation.

== Permafrost ==
Permafrost is a post-punk band, originally from Molde in Norway, which was formed in 1982 by school friends Frode Heggdal Larsen and Kåre Steinsbu. Robert Heggdal and Trond Tornes joined in 2001, and Bamonte in 2016.

To date they have released the Godtment EP in 1983, the Permafrost EP in 2019, and in 2021 released three singles—"Femme Fatale", "Closed Eyes", and "Restore Us"—which all went to number 1 on the Indie Disko Top40 Chart. In February 2022, their single "Come Back to Surprise" reached number 3 on the Deutsche Alternative Chart and number 5 on the Indie Disko Top40 Chart. Their first album, The Light Coming Through, was released in 2024.
