= Walking in My Shoes =

1993 single by Depeche Mode

Single by Depeche Mode

from the album Songs of Faith and Devotion
- B-side: "My Joy"
- Written: 1991
- Released: 26 April 1993
- Recorded: 1992
- Studio: Madrid; Château du Pape (Hamburg); Olympic (London)
- Genre: Alternative rock; synth-rock
- Length: 5:35 (album version); 4:59 (single version)
- Label: Mute
- Songwriter: Martin Gore
- Producers: Depeche Mode; Flood

Depeche Mode singles chronology
"I Feel You" (1993)	"Walking in My Shoes" (1993)	"Condemnation" (1993)

Music video
- "Walking in My Shoes" on YouTube

"Walking in My Shoes" is a song by the English electronic music band Depeche Mode. Produced by the band and Flood, it was released on 26 April 1993 by Mute and Sire as the second single from their eighth studio album, Songs of Faith and Devotion (1993). The song reached number 14 on the UK Singles Chart and matched the success of the previous single "I Feel You" on the US Billboard Modern Rock Tracks chart, where it reached one. The B-side is "My Joy", a song originally intended to be included on the album itself.

The song was cited by then-member Alan Wilder to be his favourite song from the album together with "In Your Room". Its music video was directed by Anton Corbijn.

== Background ==
"Walking in My Shoes" was written by songwriter Martin Gore in 1991. In February 1992, the band convened at a villa near Madrid, Spain, to start the recording sessions for the album, at which time they were presented with the demo for the song. The sessions were fraught with struggles, as lead singer Dave Gahan was struggling with an addiction to heroin, and the rest of the band found themselves frequently at odds.

== Recording ==
Recording for the song began during the Madrid sessions in February 1992. "Walking in My Shoes" began with the band jamming together. Said Wilder, "Martin [Gore] played the guitar, I played bass and we ran a rhythm machine – this was just to get the basic feel of the track, and after much trial and error, the chorus bass line and guitar pattern fell into place." The track included a piano part which was processed through a guitar processor to add distortion. Wilder wanted the song to sound less programmed, so to that end, he said that "There are different [drum] loops in the verse, an additional loop comes in on the bridge, and the chorus brings in a complete change of drum sound and rhythm. Plus, there are different drum fills, hi-hat patterns, and top percussion parts in each section. The combination of all that gives you the impression of rhythm changing all the time." By mixing the drums further into the background in the song, it helped to avoid sounding "too dance-oriented".

Wilder said that the track "is probably the best example of the new multi-layered DM sound. The more organic feel was created with the use of live bass and guitar, plus a dynamic string arrangement and a series of different drum loops, blended with both old and new Mode techniques. The e-bow guitar (playing the end melody) endowed the track with a haunting quality, which was also evident in Dave's voice mirroring the distorted piano and harpsichord riff." The songs from the album, including "Walking in My Shoes", were the first that the band used Cubase software to sequence.

By the time the band was at Olympic Studios in Paris in late 1992 to finish up the album, the track had been completed and Wilder began mixing the song for its single release.

== Release and promotion ==
"Walking in My Shoes" was released on 26 April 1993 in the United Kingdom. Mute Records released the single in a variety of formats, including on 7-inch vinyl with catalogue number 7BONG22 and two 12-inch vinyl singles (12BONG22 and L12BONG22). They also released 7-inch and 12-inch promotional vinyl singles, designated BONG22 and P12BONG22, respectively. In Germany, Intercord Records released the single, with the 12-inch vinyl being assigned catalogue number INT 111.912. Remixes of the track were created by Jonny Dollar, Portishead, William Orbit, and Mark 'Spike' Stent. The single's B-side was another Gore composition, "My Joy", which was originally intended for inclusion on the album itself, but was moved to a B-side when the band agreed it wasn't a strong enough track. Wilder and Steve Lyon, who had acted as the sound engineer on the album, provided a remix of "My Joy." Said Wilder, "It was remixed by Steve Lyon and myself; I reconfigured the track for the 12-inch version, with Steve engineering."

The single failed to reach the UK top 10 or the US top 40; nevertheless, the song became a top ten hit in some countries of Continental Europe, and became a recurring song during the live performances of the band since 1993. The song peaked number 14 on the UK Singles Chart and number 69 on the US Billboard Hot 100. On the Billboard Modern Rock Tracks chart, it peaked number one for a week.

On the album, "Walking in My Shoes" was slotted as the second track, after "I Feel You" and before "Condemnation".

Though Wilder said that the band members had drifted as far apart as they had ever been during the recording of the song and album, the emotional stress contributed to make "Walking in My Shoes" one of the band's greatest works. Years later, Wilder, Gore and producer Flood called the song one of the best they'd ever made.

=== Music video ===
The accompanying music video for "Walking in My Shoes" was directed by Dutch photographer, film director and music video director Anton Corbijn. Praised as one of their best videos in Burmeister and Lang's Monument biography, the video visuals are inspired by Hieronymus Bosch's triptych The Garden of Earthly Delights.

== Critical reception ==
Professional ratings
Review scores
Source	Rating
AllMusic	4.5/5 stars

David Fricke from Melody Maker wrote: "'Walking in My Shoes' is better neo-Bowie than we've heard in some time, a long-distance 'Heroes' knockoff via the group's own 'Enjoy the Silence' complete with hints of Robert Fripp's skysaw guitar." Sam Wood from Philadelphia Inquirer felt that the song, "with its moody minor-key melody and burbling bass-line reminiscent of early Simple Minds, adapts an ancient Native American proverb to create an anthemic plea for compassion". Andrew Harrison from Select named it the best track of the album, noting its "intensified, pulsating downward spiral". Leesa Daniels from Smash Hits gave it three out of five, adding: "The great thing about the 'Mode is their songs always have a chorus that's easy to sing along to. That's the case here, although for a change it does take a few listens to get the hang of it. The song is very atmospheric in a black-and-white-grainy-film for the video kind of way. Lovely."

In 2017, Billboard magazine included "Walking in My Shoes" on their list of Top 20 Depeche Mode songs, placing it at number sixteen.

In 2020, U2 lead singer Bono listed the song on his "60 Songs That Saved My Life" playlist.

== Live performances ==
Depeche Mode performed "Walking in My Shoes" live during their subsequent tours, including the 1993–94 Devotional Tour, the 2001 Exciter Tour, the 2005–06 Touring the Angel tour, the 2009–10 Tour of the Universe, the 2013–14 Delta Machine Tour, the 2018–19 Global Spirit Tour and the 2023–24 Memento Mori World Tour. Performances from these tours were released on Devotional (1993), One Night in Paris (2002), Touring the Angel: Live in Milan (2006), Tour of the Universe: Barcelona 20/21.11.09 (2010), Live in Berlin (2014), and Depeche Mode: M (2025).

On the Global Spirit Tour, the song was accompanied by a narrative video about a transgender musician getting dressed in the morning and going to perform at a bar.

== Other releases ==
The song, in its original or remixed form, appears on later compilation releases, including The Singles 86–98 (1998), Remixes 81–04 (2004), The Best of Depeche Mode Volume 1 (2006) and Remixes 2: 81–11 (2011).

== Track listings ==
All songs were written by Martin Gore.

- UK CD single
1. "Walking in My Shoes" (seven inch mix) – 4:59
2. "Walking in My Shoes" (Grungy Gonads mix) – 6:24
3. "My Joy" (seven inch mix) – 3:57
4. "My Joy" (Slow Slide mix) – 5:11
- UK limited-edition CD and 12-inch single
1. "Walking in My Shoes" (extended twelve inch mix) – 6:54
2. "Walking in My Shoes" (Random Carpet mix) – 6:35
3. "Walking in My Shoes" (Anandamidic mix) – 6:11
4. "Walking in My Shoes" (Ambient Whale mix) – 4:54
- UK 12-inch single

A1. "Walking in My Shoes" (Grungy Gonads mix) – 6:24
A2. "Walking in My Shoes" (seven inch mix) – 4:59
B1. "My Joy" (seven inch mix) – 3:57
B2. "My Joy" (Slow Slide mix) – 5:11
- Note: The Japanese CD single switches tracks A1 and A2.

- UK and US cassette single; US 7-inch single
1. "Walking in My Shoes" – 4:59
2. "My Joy" – 3:57
- US 12-inch and maxi-cassette single

A1. "Walking in My Shoes" (extended twelve inch mix) – 6:53
A2. "Walking in My Shoes" (Random Carpet mix edit) – 6:10
A3. "Walking in My Shoes" (Grungy Gonads mix) – 6:24
B1. "Walking in My Shoes" (Anandamidic mix) – 6:11
B2. "Walking in My Shoes" (Ambient Whale mix) – 4:54
B3. "My Joy" (Slow Slide mix) – 5:12

- US maxi-CD single
1. "Walking in My Shoes" (seven inch mix) – 4:59
2. "Walking in My Shoes" (Grungy Gonads mix) – 6:24
3. "Walking in My Shoes" (Random Carpet mix) – 6:10
4. "My Joy" (Slow Slide mix) – 5:12
5. "Walking in My Shoes" (extended twelve inch mix) – 6:53
6. "Walking in My Shoes" (Anandamidic mix) – 6:11
7. "My Joy" – 3:58
8. "Walking in My Shoes" (Ambient Whale mix) – 4:54

== Charts ==
=== Weekly charts ===
Chart (1993)	Peak position
Australia (ARIA)	74
Austria (Ö3 Austria Top 40)	29
Canada Top Singles (RPM)	51
Denmark (IFPI)	5
Europe (Eurochart Hot 100)	9
Europe (European Hit Radio)	7
Finland (Suomen virallinen lista)	7
France (SNEP)	23
Germany (GfK)	14
Greece (IFPI)	7
Ireland (IRMA)	15
Netherlands (Dutch Top 40 Tipparade)	7
Netherlands (Single Top 100)	36
Portugal (AFP)	3
Spain (AFYVE)	6
Sweden (Sverigetopplistan)	8
Switzerland (Schweizer Hitparade)	26
UK Singles (Official Charts)	14
UK Indie (Music Week)	1
US Billboard Hot 100	69
US Alternative Airplay (Billboard)	1
US Dance Singles Sales (Billboard)	15
US Cash Box Top 100	66

=== Year-end charts ===
Chart (1993)	Position
Europe (Eurochart Hot 100)	93
Sweden (Topplistan)	89
US Modern Rock Tracks (Billboard)	9

== Release history ==
Region	Date	Format(s)	Label(s)	Ref.
Australia	26 April 1993	CD; cassette	Liberation; Mute	
United Kingdom	26 April 1993	12-inch vinyl; CD; cassette	Mute	
Japan	1 May 1993	CD	Mute	

== See also ==
- Number one modern rock hits of 1993
