= In Your Room (Depeche Mode song) =

1994 single by Depeche Mode

Single by Depeche Mode

from the album Songs of Faith and Devotion
- B-side: "Higher Love"
- Released: 10 January 1994
- Studio: Madrid; Château du Pape (Hamburg); Olympic (London)
- Genre: Alternative rock; dance-rock
- Length: 4:52 (single mix); 6:26 (album version)
- Label: Mute
- Songwriter: Martin Gore
- Producers: Depeche Mode; Flood

Depeche Mode singles chronology
"Condemnation" (1993)	"In Your Room" (1994)	"Barrel of a Gun" (1997)

Music video
- "In Your Room" on YouTube

"In Your Room" is a song by the English electronic band Depeche Mode, released on 10 January 1994 by Mute Records as the fourth and final single from their eighth studio album, Songs of Faith and Devotion (1993). The song was written by Martin Gore and produced by Depeche Mode and Flood, reaching number eight on the UK Singles Chart as well as number two in Denmark, Finland, Israel, and Sweden.

The music video, directed by the Dutch director Anton Corbijn, was filmed as a sort of retrospective of the band's earlier videos, as Corbijn didn't think the band was going to survive, due to their internal fractures and lead singer Dave Gahan's heroin addiction. It is the last single to feature Alan Wilder as a member of the band before his departure in 1995.

== Background ==
Depeche Mode had taken time off after their successful album Violator and supporting World Violation Tour in 1990. In 1992, the band reconvened near Madrid, Spain, to record material for their new album.

== Recording ==
According to Wilder, the song's production was "difficult", saying "we recorded it three or four different ways. One was entirely as you heard it on the second verse, with smaller drum kits and the 'groovy' bassline. But the whole song with that rhythm wasn't strong enough, it didn't go anywhere. We had the song structure from a fairly early stage. We knew where we wanted the verses, choruses and middle eights. So much as I did with 'I Feel You', I went in and played drums along with the track in one particular style, then did it again in a funkier style, and so on." He added that "The track's particular strength lay in the subtle layering of instrumentation – a bubbling synth part, hypnotic groove and rousing strings – and from start to finish it was characterised by an ever–building tension that kept the listeners on the edge of their seats. This sense of anticipation is dynamically realised in the impassioned lyrics of the third verse and in perfect sync, the music steps up a gear, led by the intensity of the drums and spills over into the final chorus."

The song, described by Wilder as one of his favorite Depeche Mode tracks ever, was called "the most sensual piece they've ever recorded" in a review in 1993.

== Release ==
In Your Room was released as the fourth and final single from Songs of Faith and Devotion in January 1994. Label Mute Records released the single in several formats: a 12-inch single with catalogue number 12BONG24, a CD single with catalogue number CDBONG24, a limited edition CD single (LCDBONG24) and a third CD single designated XLCDBONG24. The single had a staggered release schedule, with the 12-inch vinyl CDBONG24 released on 10 January, and LCDBONG24 and XLCDBONG24 released on 17 January. Mute also released a promotional 12-inch vinyl, designated P12BONG24. In Germany, Intercord Records released the single with catalogue number INT 111.914. Although the second two CD singles came in their own slipcase, the CDs were designed to be held by CDBONG24's special foldout digicase.

The B-sides to LCDBONG24 were live tracks recorded in Liévin, France on 29 July 1993 during the Devotional Tour.

== Critical reception ==
Professional ratings
Review scores
Source	Rating
AllMusic	4.5/5 stars

Larry Flick from Billboard magazine noted that the song "sees the band move further into dance-rock territory." He added, "Typically haunting vocals and intense lyrics are enhanced by rugged beats and a quasi-industrial guitar sound that will ring true in the hearts of alternative DJs." David Fricke from Melody Maker wrote, "'In Your Room' is sleight-of-schtick that slips under your skin; assembly-line electro-groaning, errant feedback cries panning across the stereo spectrum, earthquake sequencer rumbling, what sounds like a real drum march complete with hissing cymbal." Martin Aston from Music Week gave it a top score of five out of five. Another Music Week editor, Alan Jones, named it Pick of the Week, saying, "Less obviously a rock record than some of their recent releases, the new Depeche Mode single is a fairly dark but nonethe less quite commercial record in which some dense guitar work is punctuated by a pleasant chorus." Music & Media wrote, "Is that room service the industrial way, with a buzzing intro easily drowning out the worst alarm clock? Don't cut it, because it wakes up the listeners before the ardent song itself starts." Sam Wood from Philadelphia Inquirer found that it "seem to be about divine visitation."

== Music video ==
The accompanying music video for "In Your Room" (using the Zephyr mix) was directed by Dutch director Anton Corbijn and features various references to many of Depeche Mode's previous videos. Corbijn described the video as a retrospective of the work he had done with Depeche Mode, saying that he made it that way because he wasn't sure if he was going to do another Depeche Mode video after it. He later elaborated stating, that this video was made during the rise of band troubles and of Gahan's drug addiction so it was uncertain whether the band would still exist for another video to be made.

== Live performances ==
Depeche Mode has played the song on various subsequent tours, including the 1993–94 Devotional Tour, the 2005–06 Touring the Angel tour, the 2009–10 Tour of the Universe, the 2013–14 The Delta Machine Tour, the 2017–18 Global Spirit Tour, and the 2023–24 Memento Mori World Tour.

Depeche Mode's first appearance on the Late Show with David Letterman, filmed during a stop on their 1998 Singles Tour, featured an abbreviated version of "In Your Room".

== Remixes ==
Remixes of "In Your Room" were provided by Butch Vig, Duke Erikson, Steve Marker, all from the band Garbage, as well as Brian Eno and Markus Dravs. Remixes of the single's B-side, "Higher Love", were provided by Jonny Dollar, Portishead, and François Kevorkian.

Wilder was not happy with Vig's remixes, feeling that they "did not relate to many aspects of the original, and the [remix] lost much of its Depeche Mode character, falling short of its intended sensuality and intensity." Despite trying out various edits and changes to the remixes, Wilder was outvoted by the rest of the band in favor of remixes provided by Vig, who was known at the time as a producer of Nirvana and was a darling of the grunge music press.

== Other releases ==
"In Your Room" has appeared on later Depeche Mode compilation albums in remixed form, including The Singles 86–98 (1998) and Remixes 81–04 (2004).

== Track listings ==
All songs were written by Martin Gore.

- UK and Australian CD1 (CDBONG24)
1. "In Your Room" (Zephyr mix)
2. "In Your Room" (extended Zephyr mix)
3. "Never Let Me Down Again" (live)
4. "Death's Door" (live)
- UK and Australian CD2 (LCDBONG24)
1. "In Your Room"
2. "Policy of Truth" (live)
3. "World in My Eyes" (live)
4. "Fly on the Windscreen" (live)
- UK and Australian CD3 (XLCDBONG24)
1. "In Your Room" (The Jeep Rock mix)
2. "In Your Room" (Apex mix)
3. "Higher Love" (Adrenaline mix)
- UK and Australian cassette single
1. "In Your Room" (Zephyr mix)
2. "Higher Love" (Adrenaline mix)
- UK 12-inch single 1 (12BONG24)

A1. "In Your Room" (Zephyr mix)
A2. "In Your Room" (Apex mix)
A3. "In Your Room" (The Jeep Rock mix)
B1. "Higher Love" (Adrenaline mix)
B2. "In Your Room" (extended Zephyr mix)

- UK 12-inch single 2 (L12BONG24)

A1. "In Your Room (live)"
A2. "Policy of Truth (live)"
A3. "World in My Eyes (live)"
B1. "Fly on the Windscreen (live)"
B2. "Never Let Me Down Again (live)"
B3. "Death's Door (live in France)"

- US 12-inch and cassette single

A1. "In Your Room" (extended Zephyr mix) – 6:43
A2. "In Your Room" (Apex mix) – 6:43
B1. "In Your Room" (The Jeep Rock mix) – 6:19
B2. "Higher Love" (Adrenaline mix) – 7:49

- US CD single
1. "In Your Room" (Zephyr mix)
2. "In Your Room" (extended Zephyr mix)
3. "Higher Love" (Adrenaline mix)
4. "In Your Room" (The Jeep Rock mix)
5. "Policy of Truth" (live)
6. "In Your Room" (Apex mix)
7. "In Your Room" (live)
- All live tracks were recorded in Liévin, France, on 29 July 1993.

== Charts ==
=== Weekly charts ===
Weekly chart performance for "In Your Room"
Chart (1994)	Peak position
Australia (ARIA)	40
Belgium (Ultratop 50 Flanders)	48
Denmark (Tracklisten)	2
Europe (Eurochart Hot 100)	9
Finland (Suomen virallinen lista)	2
France (SNEP)	10
Germany (GfK)	24
Ireland (IRMA)	15
Israel (Israeli Singles Chart)	2
Italy (Musica e dischi)	22
Spain (AFYVE)	4
Sweden (Sverigetopplistan)	2
Switzerland (Schweizer Hitparade)	14
UK Singles (Official Charts)	8
UK Indie (Music Week)	1

=== Year-end charts ===
Year-end chart performance for "In Your Room"
Chart (1994)	Position
Israel (Israeli Singles Chart)	38
Sweden (Topplistan)	47
UK Singles (OCC)	189

== Release history ==
Release dates and formats for "In Your Room"
Region	Date	Format(s)	Label(s)	Ref.
United Kingdom	10 January 1994	CD1; cassette	Mute	
United Kingdom	17 January 1994	CD2; CD3	Mute	
Australia	24 January 1994	CD1; cassette	Liberation; Mute	
Australia	31 January 1994	2× 12-inch vinyl; CD2; CD3	Liberation; Mute	
United Kingdom	14 February 1994	2× 12-inch vinyl	Mute	
