= Policy of Truth =

1990 single by Depeche Mode

Single by Depeche Mode

from the album Violator
- B-side: "Kaleid"
- Released: 7 May 1990
- Recorded: 1989
- Studio: Puk (Gjerlev); Logic (Milan); The Church (London)
- Genre: Synth-pop; alternative rock; funk
- Length: 5:05
- Label: Mute
- Songwriter: Martin L. Gore
- Producers: Depeche Mode; Flood

Depeche Mode singles chronology
"Enjoy the Silence" (1990)	"Policy of Truth" (1990)	"World in My Eyes" (1990)

Alternative cover
- Cover art for the limited-edition 12-inch single

Music video
- "Policy of Truth" on YouTube

"Policy of Truth" is a song by the English electronic music band Depeche Mode, released on 7 May 1990 as the third single from their seventh studio album Violator (1990). It is the only Depeche Mode single to chart higher on the US Billboard Hot 100 chart (number 15) than on the UK Singles Chart (number 16), and it became the band's second chart-topper on the Billboard Modern Rock Tracks chart.

== Background ==
Depeche Mode had met in early 1989 in a studio in Milan, Italy to record new material, following the successful releases of their previous album, Music for the Masses in 1987 and a live album 101 in early 1989. The band invited Mark Ellis, known professionally as Flood, to be co-producer of the new album. The sessions in Milan resulted in the song "Personal Jesus", which was released as a single in August 1989 before the rest of the album was completed. Following the Milan sessions, the band moved to Puk Recording Studios in Denmark to record the rest of their new material.

== Recording ==
Sessions at Puk Recording Studios started in the middle of 1989. Following "World in My Eyes", the second track the band recorded at Puk was "Policy of Truth". At the band's request, songwriter Martin Gore had brought in relatively simple demos for their new songs. Flood explained that, for "Policy of Truth", they worked off of Gore's simple demo and soon "we got the guitar riff together and the way the drums were programmed". He elaborated that "we started off a little bit in the way that it had been on the demo, but in the end decided to try and experiment, and try and get a feeling that was driven not by rock and not by synths." This track, alongside "World in My Eyes", marked a shift in the band's attitude about how they approached the recording process for the rest of the songs on the album. According to band member and producer Alan Wilder, the band went through over 100 different variants of the lead riff, trying numerous instruments before settling on a slide guitar. The intro melody uses a loop of a single note to obtain a vibrato effect.

Gore later said of "Policy of Truth", "It has been one of my all time favourite songs that we've ever recorded. I really like the words to it and the whole concept of having to lie to keep up appearances – maybe it's better to do that. I just really like the whole subject matter of the song."

== Release and promotion ==
"Policy of Truth" was released as a single on 7 May 1990 by Mute Records in the UK. The single was released on a variety of commercial formats, including a 7-inch vinyl single with catalogue number 7BONG19, a 12-inch vinyl single (12BONG19), a limited edition 12-inch vinyl single (L12BONG19), and CD release (LCDBONG19). The timing of the releases of the vinyl singles were staggered throughout the month of May, starting with the 7-inch on 7 May and ending with the limited edition 12-inch three weeks later on 29 May. Promotional-only releases included a CD single (BONG19R) and a 12-inch single (P12BONG19). Notable contributors to the remixes were The KLF, François Kevorkian and Daniel Miller. The single's B-side was a track called "Kaleid". On the album Violator, the song is the second track on the second side, after "Enjoy the Silence" and before "Blue Dress".

=== Music video ===
The accompanying music video for "Policy of Truth" was directed by Anton Corbijn and appears on the 1990 video collection Strange Too, The Videos 86–98 (1998) and Video Singles Collection (2016).

=== Subsequent releases ===
The song has appeared on several later Depeche Mode compilation or remix albums, including The Singles 86–98 (1998) and Remixes 81–04 (2004).

=== Live performances ===
"Policy of Truth" has been performed on several of the band's tours starting in 1990, including the 1990 World Violation Tour, the 1993 Devotional Tour, the 1994 Exotic Tour/Summer Tour '94, Touring the Angel in 2005–06, the Tour of the Universe in 2009–10, The Delta Machine Tour of 2013–14, the 2017–18 Global Spirit Tour, and the 2023–24 Memento Mori World Tour.

== Critical reception ==
Professional ratings
Review scores
Source	Rating
AllMusic	3/5 stars
Melody Maker	Positive

Jon Wilde from Melody Maker wrote "Depeche has never sounded so cute as they did on their recent hit "Enjoy the Silence". Then again, they have rarely sounded quite as ineffectual as this, not since the days when they were busy composing jingles for the mix 'n' match department of Woolworths (Basildon)." Paul Lester, in a review of the album from the same magazine, described the song as "based around a sadistic, cynical electro-riff and oozes with genuine danger" and suggested it would be a potential single from the album months before it actually became one.

== Track listings ==
All songs were written by Martin L. Gore.

UK 7-inch and cassette single

1. "Policy of Truth"
2. "Kaleid"

UK 12-inch single

A1. "Policy of Truth" (Beat Box)
B1. "Policy of Truth" (Capitol mix)
B2. "Kaleid" (When Worlds mix)

UK limited-edition 12-inch single

A1. "Policy of Truth" (Trancentral mix)
AA1. "Kaleid" (remix)
AA2. "Policy of Truth" (Pavlov's dub)

UK CD single

1. "Policy of Truth" (Beat Box)
2. "Policy of Truth" (Capitol mix)
3. "Kaleid" (remix)

UK limited-edition CD single

1. "Policy of Truth" (Trancentral mix)
2. "Kaleid" (When Worlds mix)
3. "Policy of Truth" (Pavlov's dub)
4. "Policy of Truth" (7-inch version)
5. "Kaleid" (7-inch version)

US 12-inch single

A1. "Policy of Truth" (Capitol mix) – 8:00
A2. "Policy of Truth" (Trancentral mix) – 5:53
B1. "Policy of Truth" (Beat Box mix) – 7:14
B2. "Kaleid" (When Worlds mix) – 5:23

- The Trancentral mix is mislabelled as Pavlov's dub on the liner notes

US maxi-CD single

1. "Policy of Truth" (single version) – 3:40
2. "Policy of Truth" (Capitol mix) – 8:00
3. "Policy of Truth" (Beat Box mix) – 7:13
4. "Kaleid" (remix) – 4:36
5. "Policy of Truth" (Pavlov's dub) – 6:02
- Pavlov's dub is mislabelled as the Trancentral mix on the liner notes

US maxi-cassette single

A1. "Policy of Truth" (Capitol mix) – 8:00
A2. "Policy of Truth" (Pavlov's dub) – 5:53
B1. "Policy of Truth" (Beat Box mix) – 7:14
B2. "Kaleid" (When Worlds mix) – 5:23

Japanese CD EP

1. "Policy of Truth"
2. "Kaleid"
3. "Policy of Truth" (Beat Box)
4. "Policy of Truth" (Capitol mix)
5. "Kaleid" (When Worlds mix)
6. "Policy of Truth" (Trancentral mix)
7. "Kaleid" (remix)
8. "Policy of Truth" (Pavlov's dub)

== Charts ==
=== Weekly charts ===
Weekly chart performance for "Policy of Truth"
Chart (1990)	Peak position
Australia (ARIA)	143
Belgium (Ultratop 50 Flanders)	21
Canada Top Singles (RPM)	14
Europe (Eurochart Hot 100 Singles)	21
Finland (Suomen virallinen lista)	5
France (SNEP)	31
Ireland (IRMA)	11
Italy (Musica e dischi)	5
Luxembourg (Radio Luxembourg)	11
Netherlands (Dutch Top 40 Tipparade)	14
Netherlands (Single Top 100)	37
Spain (AFYVE)	7
Sweden (Sverigetopplistan)	20
Switzerland (Schweizer Hitparade)	12
UK Singles (Official Charts)	16
UK Indie (OCC)	3
US Billboard Hot 100	15
US Alternative Airplay (Billboard)	1
US Dance Club Songs (Billboard)	2
US Dance Singles Sales (Billboard)	1
US Cash Box Top 100	17
US Dance Singles (Cash Box)	1
West Germany (GfK)	7

=== Year-end charts ===
Year-end chart performance for "Policy of Truth"
Chart (1990)	Position
Europe (Eurochart Hot 100 Singles)	91
Germany (Media Control)	63
US 12-inch Singles Sales (Billboard)	21
US Dance Club Play (Billboard)	35
US Modern Rock Tracks (Billboard)	2

== Certifications ==
Certifications for "Policy of Truth"
Region	Certification	Certified units/sales
United States (RIAA)	Platinum	1,000,000^{‡}
^{‡} Sales+streaming figures based on certification alone.

== Release history ==
Release dates and formats for "Policy of Truth"
Region	Date	Format(s)	Label(s)	Ref.
United Kingdom	7 May 1990	7-inch vinyl	Mute	
United Kingdom	21 May 1990	12-inch vinyl	Mute	
United Kingdom	29 May 1990	Limited-edition 12-inch vinyl	Mute	
Australia	11 June 1990	7-inch vinyl; 12-inch vinyl; cassette	Mute	
Japan	25 June 1990	CD	Mute	

== See also ==
- List of Billboard Modern Rock Tracks Number Ones of the 1990s
