= World Violation Tour =

1990 concert tour by Depeche Mode

- Tour by Depeche Mode
- Official tour poster
- Associated album: Violator
- Start date: 28 May 1990
- End date: 27 November 1990
- Legs: 3
- No. of shows: 43 in North America; 38 in Europe; 6 in Asia; 1 in Oceania; 88 in total

Depeche Mode concert chronology
- Music for the Masses Tour (1987–1988); World Violation Tour (1990); Devotional Tour (1993)

The World Violation Tour was a 1990 concert tour by English electronic group Depeche Mode in support of the act's seventh studio album, Violator. The tour started in May 1990 and ran through the end of that year, and was the first Depeche Mode tour to see the band regularly play stadium-sized venues.

Buoyed by their most successful album (Violator), and on the heels of their Music for the Masses (1987) and 101 (1989) albums, by the end of the tour, Depeche Mode had toured to over one million fans.

== Background ==
Depeche Mode's previous tour, the Music for the Masses Tour, had run from late 1987 to the middle of 1988, and was supported by the live video and record release of 101 in early 1989. These two albums had brought Depeche Mode a level of popularity internationally that was, until that point, unknown to them. Violator was released in March 1990 and had already seen two successful singles to support it by the time the tour started – "Personal Jesus" and "Enjoy the Silence". The day before Violator was released, the band attended a record-signing event in Los Angeles at a record store, but the event drew so many fans that the band had to be escorted out, and LA riot police had to be called in to control the large crowds who had come to see the band.

== Tour details ==
The tour ran from May to November 1990 over 88 shows. Due to the popularity the band had cultivated over the past few years, and the success of Violator and its singles, the band played mostly stadiums for the first time. The band rehearsed for the tour in Pensacola, Florida, the same city where the tour kicked off. It was the first time the band has performed live in the state, and the band received some flak from locals who didn't understand their appearance; Alan Wilder was quoted to Rolling Stone saying "I've been called a faggot about twenty times today, mostly from guys leaning out of trucks. This is sort of a backward place, isn't it?"

The tour kicked off with a North American leg in late May, finishing up in early August in Los Angeles at Dodger Stadium. The North American dates were met with high demand with sellouts in Dallas, Chicago, Orlando, Tampa and Miami; 42,000 tickets for the concert at Giants Stadium in East Rutherford, New Jersey had reportedly been sold within four hours of going on sale, while the Dodger Stadium shows had sold out on the first day of sale. Later in the month, the group played a sole date in Australia, in Sydney, prior to a six-date tour of Japan in September. Following the Japanese dates, the band commenced a European tour, beginning in Brussels in late September. The leg included three dates at the Palais Omnisports Bercy in Paris, where the group performed to approximately 50,000 people. The leg lasted two months and concluded with the final show of the tour in Birmingham, England, in late November.

The stage and projections for the tour was designed by frequent collaborator Anton Corbijn. The tour required approximately 100 stage crew and 11 trucks to transport the set and equipment.

Industrial band Nitzer Ebb opened for the band in North America and Europe.

The band felt they had successfully crossed over from a synth band to a rock band who happened to use synthesisers. Said Wilder of the scale of the tour, "We've been building to this over the last ten years." By the completion of the tour, Pulse! magazine estimated that over 1.2 million fans had attended the tour.

== Tour incidents and cancelled shows ==
A show in Salt Lake City, Utah, had to be postponed a day and required a venue change after a thunderstorm forced a cancellation of the original outdoor venue. Despite this, Wilder remembered it as one of the best shows the band played on that tour. The show in Ottawa, Canada had to be cancelled when asbestos was discovered at the venue. A show in Melbourne, Australia had to be cancelled when singer Dave Gahan was told by a doctor he needed to give his voice a rest; the show could not be rescheduled due to the impending Asian leg of the tour. Tennis star Steffi Graf was in attendance of the show in Frankfurt, Germany.

Although Gahan was married to Jo Gahan Fox at the time, Gahan started an affair with the band's US publicist Teresa Conroy, later saying he started to fall in love with her during the tour. Gahan would divorce Fox in 1991 and marry Conroy in 1992.

=== Drug use ===
The previous Music for the Masses Tour had seen a rise in drug use among the band, with Gahan using cocaine more regularly. For the World Violation Tour, drugs were more prevalent. Said band member Martin Gore, "there were different levels of debauchery for all the different members of the band. I think I was worse on the World Violation Tour – there was a lot of ecstasy still lying around. We used to go out all the time and take quite a lot," although bandmate Andy Fletcher said he "spat it out" when it was offered.

== Equipment ==
The band used an Emax II Turbo sampler to play back sounds and songs during the tour. Wilder, songwriter Martin Gore and Andy Fletcher each had two keyboards in front on them on stage, but one was a backup in case the first failed. The two keyboards were linked so that in the event of a switch, the backup keyboard was ready to play the right sounds. Both Fletcher and Gore played electronic percussion pads on stage, which triggered samples on the Emax II, which was kept out of sight under the stage to avoid visual clutter. Wilder played a special set of electronic tom-toms, which can play sampled sounds controlled by his keyboard, or could work as drums themselves. The band used two TASCAM MR16 tape machines for their shows, one of which was a backup synched by computer in case the primary one failed.

== Reviews ==
Rolling Stone called out the tour as one of the highlights of the 1990 summer music scene, saying "These British synth poppers offer post-industrial melancholy you can dance to. And their misery certainly loves company – on their last tour, they sold out the Rose Bowl." A review of the show in Sounds for the concert in Los Angeles was positive, with the reviewer saying "Two encores, and the entire show is CD perfect, the ideal opportunity to witness 50,000 maniacs having one hell of a good time."

The tour was nominated for "Best Tour of the Year" at the 1991 International Rock Awards.

== Recordings ==
Depeche Mode did not release any official live album or video from the World Violation Tour, which Wilder attributed to their label, Mute Records, who felt that there was too little time lapsed since their previous live album, 101, had been released the previous year. At least one of the three shows in Paris was officially recorded for publishing purposes, but the recording remains unreleased.

Two concerts of the American leg of the tour, one in San Francisco and one in LA, were recorded by the staff of the stadium; the band issued 90-second snippets of each song from the LA show on their website in 2012.

== Subsequent events ==
Mute label owner and producer Daniel Miller said of that tour, "A lot of things happened to the individuals in the band during and after the Violator tour. They never changed as people, they were always very down to earth, but they'd been elevated into superstars and that does have an effect on people."

During the tour, Gahan's father died, and after the tour, he split from his wife Joanne Fox Gahan and young son and moved to Los Angeles to live with his new girlfriend, Teresa Conroy. Gahan began to slide into heroin addiction, which almost led to the break-up of the band a few years later. After Gahan's recovery in the late 1990s, he said of his time on the World Violation Tour, "I had everything that I could possibly want but I was really lost. I didn't feel like I even know myself anymore. And I felt like shit because I constantly cheated on my wife and I went back home and lied."

Before the tour began, the band anticipated taking a break for several years at the conclusion of the tour. Said Gore, "We've been doing it [recording music and touring] for 10 years without any huge breaks. All of us in the band could use a long stretch of sanity." Despite this, at the end of the tour, the band agreed to take only a year-long break, although that break was interrupted in mid-1991 when the band returned to the studio to record a new track titled "Death's Door" for Wim Wenders' film, Until the End of the World (1991). In February 1992, the band reconvened in Madrid to start work on their follow-up album, Songs of Faith and Devotion (1993).

== Musicians ==
- Dave Gahan – lead vocals
- Martin Gore – guitar, samplers, percussion pads, backing and lead vocals
- Alan Wilder – samplers, percussion pads, backing vocals
- Andy Fletcher – samplers, percussion pads, backing vocals

== Set list ==
The following is the setlist for the show in Los Angeles on 4 August 1990.

1. "Kaleid"
2. "World in My Eyes"
3. "Halo"
4. "Shake the Disease"
5. "Everything Counts"
6. "Master and Servant"
7. "Never Let Me Down Again"
8. "Waiting for the Night"
9. "I Want You Now" (*) (acoustic)
10. "World Full of Nothing" (*) (acoustic)
11. "Clean"
12. "Stripped"
13. "Policy of Truth"
14. "Enjoy the Silence"
15. "Strangelove"
16. "Personal Jesus"
  Encore 1
17. "Black Celebration"
18. "A Question of Time"
  Encore 2
19. "Behind the Wheel"
20. "Route 66" (Bobby Troup cover)

Notes:

- "(*)" denotes song sung by Martin Gore.

== Tour dates ==
Date	City	Country	Venue/Event
North America
28 May 1990	Pensacola	United States	Pensacola Civic Center
30 May 1990	Orlando	United States	Orlando Arena
31 May 1990	Miami	United States	Miami Arena
2 June 1990	Tampa	United States	USF Sun Dome
4 June 1990	Atlanta	United States	Coca-Cola Lakewood Amphitheatre
6 June 1990	Columbia	United States	Merriweather Post Pavilion
8 June 1990	Saratoga Springs	United States	Saratoga Performing Arts Center
9 June 1990	Mansfield	United States	Great Woods Center for the Performing Arts
10 June 1990	Mansfield	United States	Great Woods Center for the Performing Arts
13 June 1990	Philadelphia	United States	The Spectrum
14 June 1990	Philadelphia	United States	The Spectrum
16 June 1990	East Rutherford	United States	Giants Stadium
18 June 1990	New York City	United States	Radio City Music Hall
21 June 1990	Montreal	Canada	Montreal Forum
22 June 1990	Toronto	Canada	CNE Grandstand
24 June 1990	Burgettstown	United States	Coca-Cola Star Lake Amphitheater
25 June 1990	Cincinnati	United States	Riverbend Music Center
26 June 1990	Cuyahoga Falls	United States	Blossom Music Center
28 June 1990	Clarkston	United States	Pine Knob Music Theatre
29 June 1990	Clarkston	United States	Pine Knob Music Theatre
30 June 1990	Milwaukee	United States	Marcus Amphitheater
2 July 1990	Tinley Park	United States	World Music Theatre
3 July 1990	Tinley Park	United States	World Music Theatre
5 July 1990	The Woodlands	United States	Cynthia Woods Mitchell Pavilion
6 July 1990	The Woodlands	United States	Cynthia Woods Mitchell Pavilion
8 July 1990	Dallas	United States	Coca-Cola Starplex Amphitheatre
9 July 1990	Dallas	United States	Coca-Cola Starplex Amphitheatre
11 July 1990	Morrison	United States	Red Rocks Amphitheatre
12 July 1990	Morrison	United States	Red Rocks Amphitheatre
14 July 1990	Calgary	Canada	Olympic Saddledome
16 July 1990	Vancouver	Canada	Pacific Coliseum
18 July 1990	Portland	United States	Memorial Coliseum
20 July 1990	Mountain View	United States	Shoreline Amphitheatre
21 July 1990	Mountain View	United States	Shoreline Amphitheatre
22 July 1990	Sacramento	United States	Cal Expo Amphitheatre
25 July 1990	Salt Lake City	United States	Salt Palace
27 July 1990	Phoenix	United States	Arizona Veterans Memorial Coliseum
28 July 1990	San Diego	United States	San Diego Sports Arena
29 July 1990	San Diego	United States	San Diego Sports Arena
31 July 1990	San Diego	United States	San Diego Sports Arena
1 August 1990	Universal City	United States	Universal Amphitheatre
4 August 1990	Los Angeles	United States	Dodger Stadium
5 August 1990	Los Angeles	United States	Dodger Stadium
Oceania
31 August 1990	Sydney	Australia	Hordern Pavilion
Asia
4 September 1990	Fukuoka	Japan	Shimin Kaikan Dai Hall
6 September 1990	Kobe	Japan	World Memorial Hall
8 September 1990	Kanazawa	Japan	Ishikawa Kōsei Nenkin Kaikan
9 September 1990	Nagoya	Japan	Nagoya Civic Assembly Hall
11 September 1990	Tokyo	Japan	Nippon Budokan
12 September 1990	Tokyo	Japan	Nippon Budokan
Europe
28 September 1990	Brussels	Belgium	Forest National
29 September 1990	Dortmund	West Germany	Westfalenhallen
30 September 1990	Dortmund	West Germany	Westfalenhallen
2 October 1990	Copenhagen	Denmark	Valby-Hallen
3 October 1990	Copenhagen	Denmark	Valby-Hallen
5 October 1990	Gothenburg	Sweden	Scandinavium
6 October 1990	Stockholm	Sweden	Stockholm Globe Arena
8 October 1990	Frankfurt	Germany	Festhalle Frankfurt
9 October 1990	Hanover	Germany	Messehalle Hanover
11 October 1990	Lyon	France	Halle Tony Garnier
12 October 1990	Zürich	Switzerland	Hallenstadion
14 October 1990	Frankfurt	Germany	Frankfurt Festhalle
15 October 1990	Stuttgart	Germany	Hanns-Martin-Schleyer-Halle
17 October 1990	Munich	Germany	Olympiahalle
21 October 1990	Paris	France	Palais Omnisports de Paris-Bercy
22 October 1990	Paris	France	Palais Omnisports de Paris-Bercy
23 October 1990	Paris	France	Palais Omnisports de Paris-Bercy
25 October 1990	Liévin	France	Stade Couvert Régional
26 October 1990	Rotterdam	Netherlands	Rotterdam Ahoy
28 October 1990	Hamburg	Germany	Alsterdorfer Sporthalle
29 October 1990	Hamburg	Germany	Alsterdorfer Sporthalle
31 October 1990	Berlin	Germany	Deutschlandhalle
1 November 1990	Berlin	Germany	Deutschlandhalle
3 November 1990	Strasbourg	France	Rhénus Sport
5 November 1990	Barcelona	Spain	Palau Sant Jordi
7 November 1990	Madrid	Spain	Palacio de Deportes
9 November 1990	Marseille	France	Palais des sports de Marseille
11 November 1990	Milan	Italy	Palatrussardi
12 November 1990	Rome	Italy	PalaEur
14 November 1990	Bordeaux	France	Patinoire de Mériadeck
15 November 1990	Bordeaux	France	Patinoire de Mériadeck
17 November 1990	Brest	France	Parc des expositions de la Penfeld
19 November 1990	London	England	Wembley Arena
20 November 1990	London	England	Wembley Arena
22 November 1990	Birmingham	England	NEC Arena
23 November 1990	London	England	Wembley Arena
26 November 1990	Birmingham	England	NEC Arena
27 November 1990	Birmingham	England	NEC Arena
