= World in My Eyes =

1990 single by Depeche Mode

Single by Depeche Mode

from the album Violator
- B-side: "Happiest Girl"; "Sea of Sin"
- Released: 17 September 1990
- Recorded: 1989
- Studio: Puk (Gjerlev); Logic (Milan); The Church Studios (London)
- Genre: Synth-pop
- Length: 4:26 (album version); 4:00 (edit)
- Label: Mute
- Songwriter: Martin Gore
- Producers: Depeche Mode; Flood

Depeche Mode singles chronology
"Policy of Truth" (1990)	"World in My Eyes" (1990)	"I Feel You" (1993)

Music video
- "World in My Eyes" on YouTube

Professional ratings
Review scores
Source	Rating
AllMusic	4.5/5 stars

"World in My Eyes" is a song by the English electronic music band Depeche Mode. It was released on 17 September 1990 by Mute Records as the fourth and final single from their seventh studio album, Violator (1990). The song peaked at number two in Denmark and Spain, number 17 on the UK Singles Chart, and number 52 on the US Billboard Hot 100. The accompanying music video was directed by Anton Corbijn.

== Background ==
Depeche Mode met in 1989 to record new material. The band invited Mark Ellis, known professionally as Flood, to be co-producer of the new album. Early recording sessions in Milan resulted in the song "Personal Jesus", which was released as a single in August 1989 before the rest of the album was completed. Following the Milan sessions, the band moved to Puk Recording Studios in Denmark to record the rest of their new material.

== Recording ==
At the request of the rest of the band, Martin Gore brought in simpler, less-complete demos of the new songs for the band to work from. "World in My Eyes" was the first song the band worked on at Puk, although recording started during their sessions at Logic Studios in Milan. Parts of the song, including the inclusion of its third verse and vocal doubles, were completed at sessions at The Church Studios in London in late 1989.

Flood later recalled how he wasn't happy with how he and band member Alan Wilder had originally recorded the song, and had mentioned that fact to both Wilder and lead singer Dave Gahan. The next morning, Gore and Andy Fletcher came in to the studio and said the same thing, and at that point they realised they had to start over, so Wilder and Flood spent half a day "just jamming out ideas". The track's bass line and melody came out of those sessions, and by the time the rest of the band returned, the track had completely changed. Flood said that after he and Wilder played the band the new version, the rest of the band looked a bit shocked. Said Fletcher, "I don't remember [World in My Eyes] standing out when we heard it then [as a demo]. But somehow, in the studio, it all came together brilliantly... Whenever I'm asked which of our tracks is my favourite, I always say 'World in My Eyes'." In 1998, Gore explained the stages it went through in terms of the original demo version:

I remember the original demo of "World in My Eyes" being slightly faster and maybe slightly more obvious. While we were recording it in Milan, Dave [Gahan] was going away for a couple of days, so we worked on it and turned it into this really moody piece. I can remember Dave arriving back in the studio, slightly jet-lagged and being totally shocked, thinking that we just ruined the song, but half a day later he came back and said 'That's really good, the way it's turned out'. It always takes a while to get used to things.

Gore called the track a very positive song, saying "It's saying that love and sex and pleasure are positive things."

== Release and promotion ==
"World in My Eyes" was released as a single on 17 September 1990 by Mute Records in the UK. It was released on a variety of formats, including 7-inch vinyl designated with catalogue number 7BONG20, 12-inch vinyl (12BONG20) and a limited-edition 12-inch vinyl single designated L12BONG20. The limited-edition 12-inch vinyl single came sealed in a blue translucent plastic sleeve, which had to be cut open to play the record. Promotionally, Mute released a 7-inch promotional vinyl (BONG20R) and a CD single (CDBONG20R). Intercord released the single in Germany, and Sire Records released the single in the US. Remixes of the song and its B-sides "Happiest Girl" and "Sea of Sin" were made by François Kevorkian, Jon Marsh and Kris Weston. Both B-sides were written by Gore, and although "Happiest Girl" was briefly considered for inclusion on the album directly, "Sea of Sin" was always intended to be a B-side track. On the album, "World in My Eyes" is slotted as the opening track of the album, the first song on side one.

=== Music video ===
The music video for "World in My Eyes" was directed by Anton Corbijn. There are two versions of the video; the original music video features more footage from the World Violation Tour and the second features the band in the car instead, more live footage, and the silent ending with Gahan is longer. Versions of the video appear on the compilations Strange Too (1990), The Videos 86–98 (1998) and Video Singles Collection (2006).

=== Live performances ===
"World in My Eyes" has been performed on every one of Depeche Mode's tours since 1990, including the World Violation Tour (1990), Devotional Tour (1993), Touring the Angel (2005–06), Tour of the Universe (2009–2010), The Delta Machine Tour (2013–14), Global Spirit Tour (2017–18), and Memento Mori World Tour (2023–24).

== Track listings ==
All songs were written by Martin Gore.

UK 7-inch and cassette single

1. "World in My Eyes" – 3:58
2. "Happiest Girl" (Jack mix) – 4:57
3. "Sea of Sin" (Tonal mix) – 4:43

UK 12-inch single

A1. "World in My Eyes" (Oil Tank mix) – 7:29
B1. "Happiest Girl" (Kiss-A-Mix) – 6:15
B2. "Sea of Sin" (Sensoria) – 6:06

UK limited-edition 12-inch single

A1. "World in My Eyes" (Dub in My Eyes) – 6:55
B1. "World in My Eyes" (Mode to Joy) – 6:32
B2. "Happiest Girl" (The Pulsating Orbital mix) – 6:28

UK CD single

1. "World in My Eyes" (7-inch version) – 4:00
2. "World in My Eyes" (Oil Tank mix) – 6:53
3. "Happiest Girl" (Kiss-A-Mix) – 5:24
4. "Sea of Sin" (Tonal mix) – 3:37

UK limited-edition CD single

1. "World in My Eyes" (Dub in My Eyes) – 6:57
2. "World in My Eyes" (Mode to Joy) – 6:31
3. "Happiest Girl" (The Pulsating Orbital vocal mix) – 8:01
4. "Sea of Sin" (Sensoria) – 6:07
5. "World in My Eyes" (Mayhem Mode) – 4:58
6. "Happiest Girl" (Jack mix) – 4:57

US 12-inch and maxi-cassette single

1. "World in My Eyes" (Oil Tank mix) – 7:29
2. "World in My Eyes" (Dub in My Eyes mix) – 6:54
3. "Sea of Sin" (Sensoria mix) – 6:07
4. "World in My Eyes" (Mode to Joy mix) – 6:32
5. "Happiest Girl" (Jack mix) – 4:58

US maxi-CD single

1. "World in My Eyes" (single version) – 3:59
2. "World in My Eyes" (Oil Tank mix) – 7:29
3. "Happiest Girl" (Pulsating Orbital mix) – 6:28
4. "Sea of Sin" (Tonal mix) – 4:44
5. "World in My Eyes" (Mode to Joy mix) – 6:32
6. "Happiest Girl" (Jack mix) – 4:58
7. "Sea of Sin" (Sensoria mix) – 6:07

Japanese CD EP

1. "World in My Eyes" (7-inch version)
2. "Happiest Girl" (Jack mix)
3. "Sea of Sin" (Tonal mix)
4. "World in My Eyes" (Oil Tank mix)
5. "Happiest Girl" (Kiss-A-Mix)
6. "Sea of Sin" (Sensoria)
7. "World in My Eyes" (Dub in My Eyes)
8. "World in My Eyes" (Mode to Joy)
9. "Happiest Girl" (the Pulsating Orbital mix)
10. "World in My Eyes" (Mayhem Mode)

== Charts ==
=== Weekly charts ===
Chart (1990)	Peak position
Australia (ARIA)	153
Belgium (Ultratop 50 Flanders)	46
Canada Top Singles (RPM)	74
Denmark (IFPI)	2
Europe (Eurochart Hot 100)	15
Finland (Suomen virallinen lista)	4
France (SNEP)	30
Germany (GfK)	7
Hungary (Single Top 40)	30
Ireland (IRMA)	7
Luxembourg (Radio Luxembourg)	12
Netherlands (Dutch Top 40 Tipparade)	15
Netherlands (Single Top 100)	49
Spain (AFYVE)	2
Switzerland (Schweizer Hitparade)	5
UK Singles (Official Charts)	17
US Billboard Hot 100	52
US Alternative Airplay (Billboard)	17
US Dance Club Songs (Billboard)	6
US Dance Singles Sales (Billboard)	3
US Cash Box Top 100	48

=== Year-end charts ===
Chart (1990)	Position
Sweden (Topplistan)	91

Chart (1991)	Position
US 12-inch Singles Sales (Billboard)	41

== Release history ==
Region	Date	Format(s)	Label(s)	Ref.
United Kingdom	17 September 1990	—N/a	Mute	
Japan	28 November 1990	CD	Mute	
Australia	18 February 1991	7-inch vinyl; 12-inch vinyl; cassette	Liberation; Mute	
