= Kemp Owyne =

Traditional song

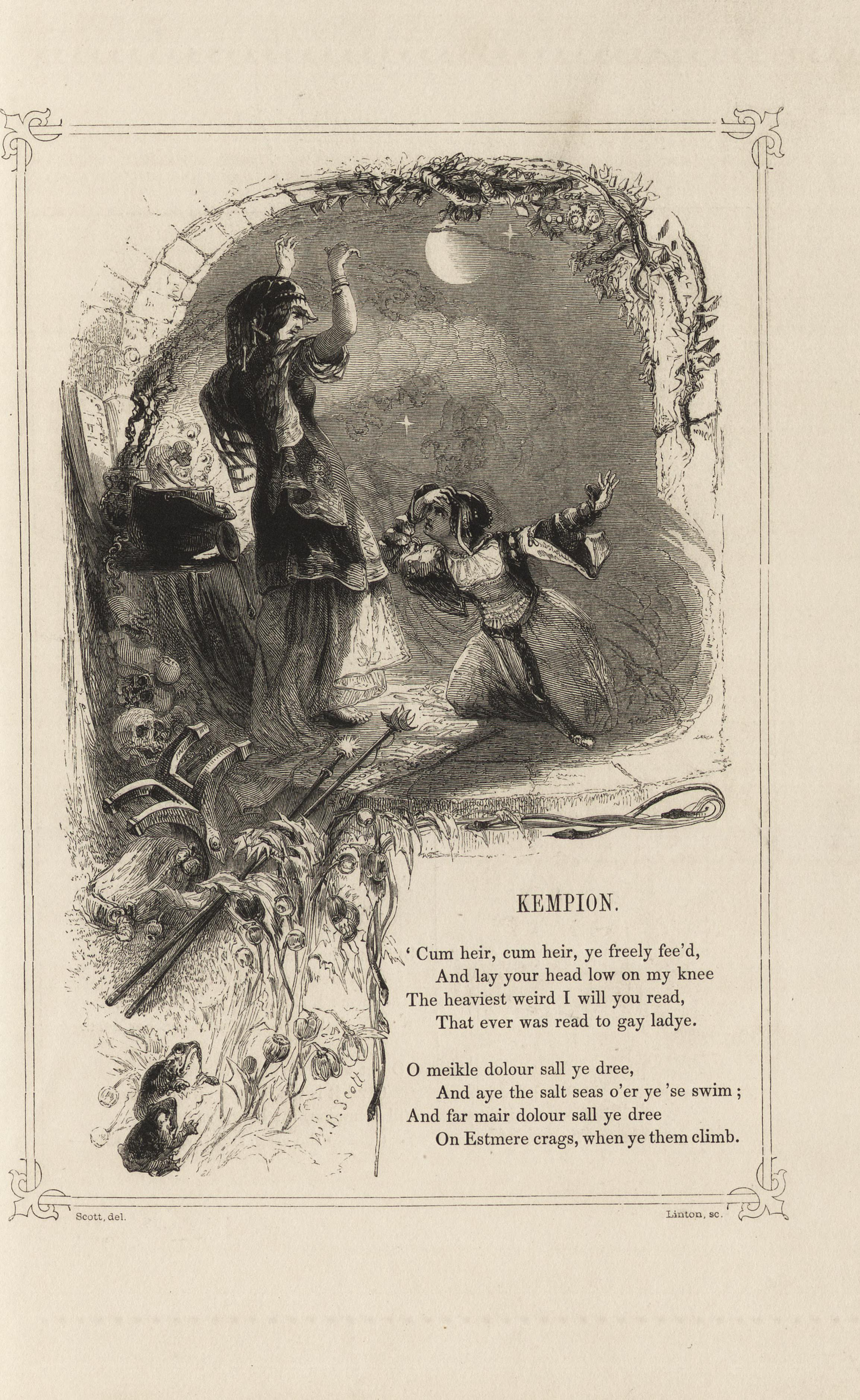
Kempion from The Book of British ballads (1842)

"Kemp Owyne" or "Kempion" (Roud 3912, Child 34) is a traditional English-language folk ballad.

== Synopsis ==
The heroine is turned into a worm (dragon), usually by her stepmother, who curses her to remain so until the king's son comes to kiss her three times. When he arrives, she offers him a belt, a ring, and a sword to kiss her, promising the things would magically protect him; the third time, she turns back into a woman. In some variants, he asks who enchanted her, a werewolf or mermaid; she says it was her stepmother and curses her into a monstrous creature, permanently.

== Variants ==
The hero of the story appears to be Ywain, from Arthurian legend. It is not clear how he came to be attached to this story, although many other Arthurian knights appear in other ballads with as little connection to their roles in the Arthurian legend, for instance Sir Lionel, who appears in a ballad of the same name.

Joseph Jacobs has suggested that "The Laidly Worm of Spindleston Heugh" (which he collected for his English Fairy Tales with touches from the ballad of "Kempion") is a localised version of the ballad of "Kemp Owyne", itself possibly a version of the Icelandic saga of Áslól and Hjálmtèr.

In the variant collected by Francis James Child, the three magical items all had the same property; he believed that originally, each one had a unique property, but these were lost.

Dove Isabeau (1989), written by Jane Yolen and illustrated by Dennis Nolan, shifts the title character to the transformed heroine but retains the narrative of the ballad, with the addition of a pet cat inhabited by the spirit of Isabeau's dead mother, who assists the hero in his rescue. Brian Peters included a recording titled "Kemp Owyne" on his album Sharper Than the Thorn. Frankie Armstrong included a recording titled "Kemp Owen" on her album The Garden of Love. Fay Hield includes a recording titled "Kemp Owen" on her album Looking Glass. Bryony Griffith sings "Kemp Owen" on her 2014 debut solo album Nightshade.

This ballad was one of 25 traditional works included in Ballads Weird and Wonderful (1912) and illustrated by Vernon Hill.

=== Scandinavian ballads ===
Child notes similarities with several Scandinavian ballads: "Jomfruen i ormeham" (DgF 59, TSB A 28 – maid transformed into snake); "Jomfruen i linden" (DgF 66, SMB 12, NMB 15, TSB A 30 – maid transformed into lime tree); "Trolden og bondens hustru" (DgF 52, TSB A 14 – knight transformed into troll); and "Lindormen" (DgF 65, SMB 11, NMB 14, TSB A 29 – prince transformed into serpent (a lindworm)).

== Translations ==
- (Modern English translation) Bodenhemier, Lou (7 July 2020). "Child Ballad 34A, Kemp Owyne" (PDF). Medieval Literature in Translation.

== See also ==
- List of the Child Ballads
- The Laily Worm and the Machrel of the Sea
- Loathly lady
