= Neil McSweeney =

British singer-songwriter (born 1976)

Neil McSweeney (born 9 June 1976 in Irvine, Scotland) is a British songwriter and musician based in Sheffield, England. His acoustic guitar playing style combines folk, blues and country influences but it is his voice, likened by The Guardian to a male Tracy Chapman, and his direct and personal lyrics, for which he is most recognised.

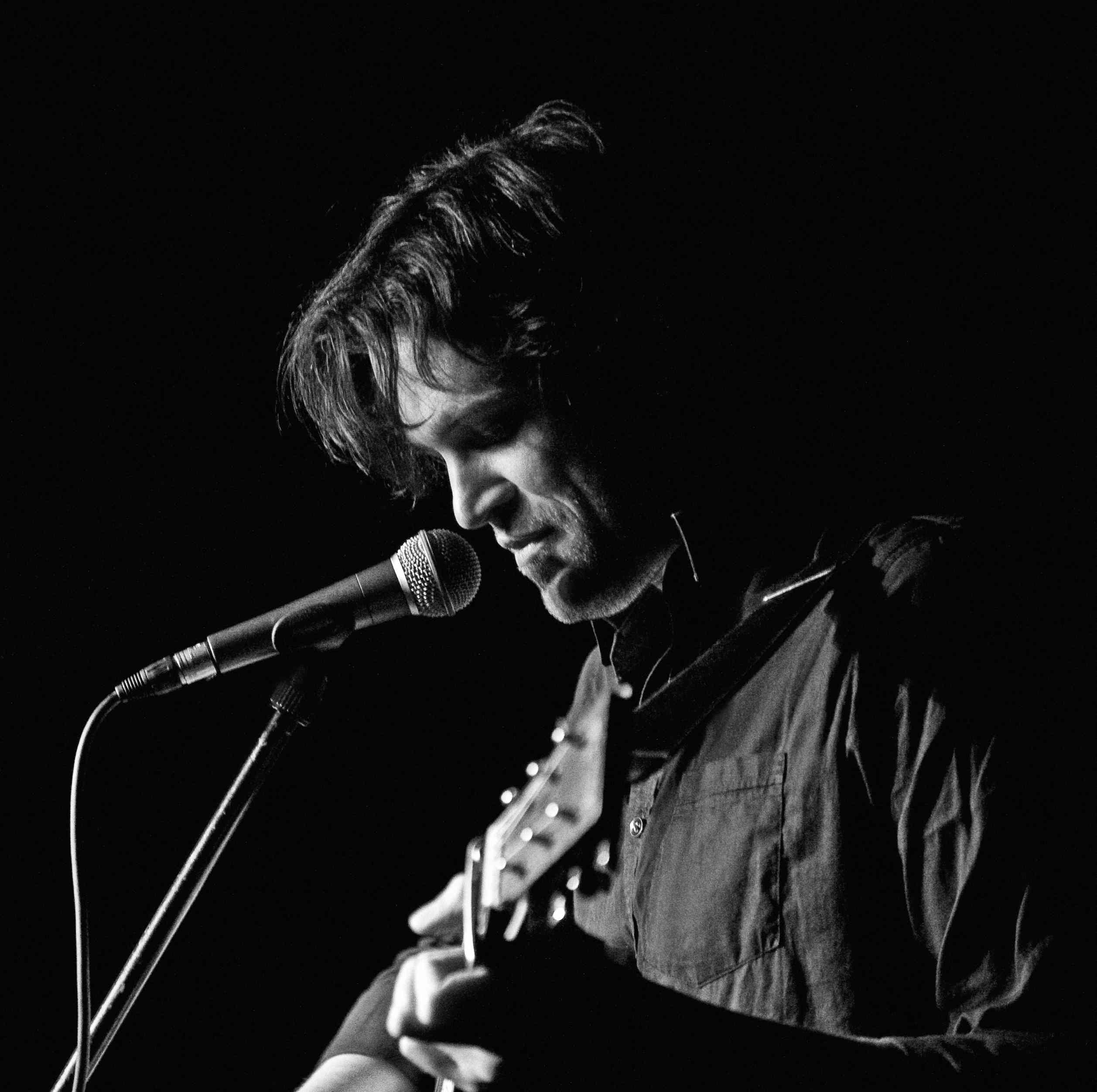
Neil McSweeney

McSweeney’s debut album, Remember To Smile was released in 2006 by Sheffield independent label, LM Music. Tracks from the album attracted national radio play from BBC Radio 2 and the digital station BBC Radio 6 Music. This led to "Postcards" being released as a single by Kids Records, the singles arm of Warner Music UK subsidiary 14th Floor Records. Further national radio exposure followed including the track being playlisted by XFM. Around this time McSweeney also accompanied his friend Stoney on record, on tour and in session for BBC Radio 2’s Dermot O'Leary at Maida Vale Studios.

Extensive touring in the UK followed before the second album, Shoreline emerged in 2009. This was self-released and attracted positive reviews in the national press, as well as the attention of fellow Sheffield musician, Richard Hawley. Following support sets at The Crucible in Sheffield and the Royal Festival Hall, McSweeney accompanied Hawley as main support on the European leg of his Truelove’s Gutter tour.

During a hiatus from touring in 2011 and 2012, reportedly to spend more time with his young family, McSweeney developed friendships with musicians from the English folk and roots scene. This developed into collaborations which formed the basis for an EP (The Seventeen EP) and a third full-length album (Cargo) both released in 2013. The album features contributions from Lucy Farrell, Sam Sweeney, Brooks Williams, Matt Boulter, Vera Van Heeringen, Jock Tyldesley, Andy Seward and others.

In late 2013, McSweeney supported English folk group Bellowhead on their UK tour. He was accompanied by Vera van Heeringen and Sweeney. Van Heeringen and McSweeney subsequently collaborated on an EP (released in October 2015).

Other projects include GluePot (with Farrell and Boulter), who released an EP (Lulu the Bear and other Stories) in 2015, and Holler, with Fay Hield and Jon Boden.

In 2016, McSweeney co-founded Hudson Records with his friend, record producer Andy Bell. In September that year, he also joined the University of Sheffield's Department of Music, where he teaches Music Management, Popular Music Studies, and songwriting.

Hudson Records released McSweeney's fourth album, A Coat Worth Wearing, in March 2017.

== Discography ==
- Remember To Smile (album)
1. "Sunrise"
2. "Postcards"
3. "Walleye Jean"
4. "Broken Truth"
5. "Smile"
6. "Flowers"
7. "London Road"
8. "Long Way Round"
9. "Heartlands"
10. "Let The Side Down"
- "Postcards" (7" single)
1. "Postcards"
2. "My Design"
- Shoreline (album)
1. "Glencoe"
2. "Standing Still"
3. "Wonder In The Making"
4. "Side To The Sun"
5. "Time"
6. "Rope To Hang"
7. "The Break"
8. "Half A Mind"
9. "Wasters"
10. "Everybody Tells Me I'm Wrong"
- The Seventeen (EP)
1. "We Are Here"
2. "In A Dream"
3. "To Live Is To Fly" (Townes Van Zandt)
4. "The Seventeen"
- Cargo (album)
1. "Bulldozer"
2. "Be Your Own Dog"
3. "Happiness"
4. "San Miniato"
5. "New Year’s Day"
6. "Sapling Bough"
7. "Snow Blind"
8. "Into The Sound"
9. "Slowly Sets The Sun"
10. "Cargo"
11. "Stop Digging"
- A Coat Worth Wearing (album)
1. "Old Glory Blues"
2. "Forlorn Hope"
3. "Danse Macabre"
4. "Land of Cockaigne"
5. "Atlantis"
6. "Strangers of Maresfield Gardens"
7. "Waving Not Drowning"
8. "Night Watchman"
9. "The Call"
