= Steáfán Hannigan =

Irish musician

Steáfán Hannigan is an Irish musician, author, composer, audio engineer, musicologist and instrument maker. Since 2008, he has made his home in Canada.

Hannigan is a multi-instrumentalist. Some of the instruments he plays are the uilleann pipes, Bodhrán tin whistle, low whistle, bouzouki, guitar, tenor banjo, flute, mandolin and various percussion instruments.

== Early life and education ==
Hannigan was born and grew up in Belfast, Northern Ireland.

== Career ==
As a young man Hannigan began performing at festivals and local events, playing the uilleann pipes, tin whistle and percussion instruments. In 1991 he and Simon Care performed the soundtrack for a BBC radio play, Voyage of the Swallows, by Eric Pringle. In 1992 he won an All-Britain uilleann pipe award. In 1994 he published an instructional book, Bodhrán Basics

Hannigan founded the Steafan Hannigan Band, which later became the Irish band Sin É. The band released two albums, Sin É and It's About Time. The group performed internationally, including at Lincoln Center in New York in 1997. Hannigan opened Oisin Studios in Milton Keynes, England, and produced a number of albums, including Tig (Serious Kitchen), and Not to Scale (Kerfuffle). While there he was interviewed by Irish Music Magazine in 1999.

In 1999, Hannigan and Sin É released an album in the United States, Deep Water Dropoff on the RCA label.

As well as fronting his own band, Hannigan performed widely with other artists and bands, including Depeche Mode Bjork, Aessia D'Andrea, and Band of Hope. He played various instruments on the albums of many bands and singers (see the discography section below).

In 2000 he published another instructional book, The Low Whistle Book, with David Ledsam.

In 2001 Hannigan arranged and performed all the instrumental solo parts for the Lionhead video game Black and White composed by Russell Shaw.

Hannigan met and married violinist Saskia Tomkins. In 2008, after moving to Canada, Hannigan and Tomkins formed a band called Cairdeas (Friends) with singer Elizabeth Barlow, and independently released an album of Irish songs and tunes, Generous Lover. Barlow was later replaced by Marsala Lukianchuk, and the band released a second album, Christmas by Candlelight. The pair continued to perform both together and separately with various Canadian groups.

During his career Hannigan has performed and presented workshops at many festivals and other music-related venues.

In 2011 Hannigan performed The Brendan Voyage, by Shaun Davey, the only classical suite written especially for uilleann pipes, accompanied by the Northumberland Orchestra in Cobourg. Hannigan was the sound editor and audio effects creator for the 26 part animated film series Legend of Ponnivala, released in 2013. In 2014 he created an original score for the Capital Theatre production of Driving Miss Daisy in Cobourg.

== Personal life ==
Hannigan and Tomkins have three musical children. In 2015 they live in Baltimore, Ontario. The family occasionally performs together at local events as Clan Hannigan.

== Publications ==
- Steáfán Hannigan (1994). Bodhrán Basics. Ossian. ISBN 978-0-946005-87-1.
- Steafan Hannigan; David Ledsam (1 December 2000). The Low Whistle Book. Mel Bay Publications. ISBN 978-0-9525305-1-0.
- The Bodhran DVD

== Partial discography ==
- Songs of Faith and Devotion, Depeche Mode, recorded 1992, released 1993 – one track called 'Judas'.
- This Morning, Lammas band, 1993
- Celtic Christmas. Valley Recordings, Littleton-on-Severn, November 1995/March 1996
- Out of the Flames: Music for Border Bagpipes from 1733 to the Present, Matt Seattle, Discipline Global Mobile, 1999
- Man Bleeds in Glasgow, Jackie Leven, 1998
- Heritage, Eileen McGann, 1997.
- Invocata, Donald Quan, 1998, Oasis Productions.
- Not up to Scale, Kerfuffle band, 2003. Also produced this album at Oisín Studios.
- Unexpected Songs, Julian Lloyd Webber, Emi Classics, 2006
- Ancient Muse, Loreena McKennitt, Verve, 2006.
- Nights from the Alhambra, Loreena McKennitt DVD and CD
- Heading Home, Christina Kidd. Also co-producer.
- Alessia D'ANDREA – Alessia D'Andrea, Renilin Music Label, 2009
- Cold in April Mat Walklate, self-released, 2006.
- Down the Irish Gravel Road, Tom Acton, Full Spiral Productions, 2009.
- Singing on the Wind, Anne Lister, Hearthfire.

== Audio and video production ==
- Legend of Ponnivala, 26 episode video series. Sound editing, audio effects,

== Stage ==
- The Cavan Blazers, Fourth Line Theatre, 2011.
- The Winslows of Derryvore, Fourth Line Theatre, 2013. Actor and musician
- The Last Five Years, Capital Theatre, Port Hope. Music director.
- Driving Miss Daisy, Capital Theatre, Port Hope. Original score, music director.
- A Midsummer Night's Dream. 2014. Uxbridge Music Hall.Original score.
- Rob Ford the musical, 2014, live theatre – sound engineer

== Partial list of festivals ==
- Northwest Folklife Festival
- Seattle World Rhythm Festival
- Calgary Folk Music Festival 1993
- Ottawa Folk Festival 1996
- Wackelsteinfestival
- Goderich Celtic College
- Muhtadi International Drumming Festival
- Millrace Folk Festival 2007
- Vancouver Celtic Festival
- Celtic Roots Festival 2008
- Portneuf Drums Festival 2012
- Canadian Celtic Celebration
- Canadian Frame Drum Festival Toronto 2009
