= Looking Glass (Fay Hield album) =

Studio album by Fay Hield
- Released: 2010
- Recorded: Wavelength Studios
- Genre: Folk
- Length: 42:29
- Label: Topic Records
- Producer: Fay Hield and Jon Boden

Professional ratings
Review scores
Source	Rating
The Guardian	3/5 stars
AllMusic	4/5 stars

Looking Glass is Fay Hield's first solo album.

== Track listing ==
No.	Title	Writer(s)	Length
1.	"The Huntsman"	Trad.	5:57
2.	"Mad Family"	Trad./Tune, Jon Boden	2:29
3.	"Two Brothers"	Trad.	3:51
4.	"The Looking Glass"	Text, Rudyard Kipling, Tune, Peter Bellamy	3:19
5.	"Little Yellow Roses"	Trad.	3:41
6.	"The Banks of the Nile"	Trad.	2:36
7.	"Kemp Owen"	Trad.	7:25
8.	"Sheepcrook and Black Dog"	Trad.	3:56
9.	"Grey Goose and Gander"	Trad.	4:01
10.	"The Shepherd's Daughter"	Trad.	2:40
11.	"King Henry"	Trad.	2:34
Total length:			42:29

== Personnel ==
- Fay Hield (vocals)
- Jon Boden (percussion, fiddle, guitar, concertina)
- Sam Sweeney (fiddle, viola, nyckelharpa).
- Jess Arrowsmith (vocals)
- Keith Angel (percussion)
- Hannah James (clogging)
