= Lighten the Dark: A Midwinter Album =

Studio album by Kerfuffle
- Released: 15 November 2009
- Genre: Folk
- Length: 42:13
- Label: RootBeat Records
- Producer: Andy Bell

Kerfuffle chronology
To the Ground (2008)	Lighten the Dark: A Midwinter Album (2009)

Lighten the Dark: A Midwinter Album is the fifth album by folk band Kerfuffle. The album was released just before the band's breakup in 2010.

== Track listing ==
No.	Title	Writer(s)	Length
1.	"Three Ships"	Trad arr. Kerfuffle	3:34
2.	"Cherry Tree Carol"	Trad arr. Kerfuffle	3:47
3.	"The Truth from Above"	Trad arr. Kerfuffle	3:55
4.	"Bransles"	Trad arr. Kerfuffle	4:50
5.	"Lullay My Liking"	Trad arr. Kerfuffle	3:06
6.	"Gallery Carol"	Trad arr. Kerfuffle	2:39
7.	"Sussex Carol"	Trad arr. Kerfuffle	2:52
8.	"Nowell, Nowell"	Trad arr. Kerfuffle	4:17
9.	"The Holly and the Ivy"	Trad arr. Kerfuffle	4:17
10.	"Gower Wassail"	Trad arr. Kerfuffle	2:26
11.	"The Bitter Withy"	Trad arr. Kerfuffle	4:54
Total length:			42:13

== Personnel ==
- Sam Sweeney (fiddle, viola, English concertina, bells, shakers)
- Hannah James (accordion, vocals)
- Jamie Roberts (guitar, vocals)
- Tom Sweeney (bass guitar, vocals)
