= State and Ancientry =

Studio album by Hannah James and Sam Sweeney
- Released: 2 April 2012
- Genre: Folk
- Label: RootBeat Records
- Producer: Andy Bell

State and Ancientry is the second album by folk duo Hannah James and Sam Sweeney.

== Track listing ==
No.	Title	Length
1.	"Hole in the Wall"	3:30
2.	"Parson Upon Dorothy / Dolly"	4:17
3.	"William Taylor"	3:13
4.	"How Do You Do?; Gallons Of Cognac"	5:27
5.	"On Yonder Hill There Sits A Hare"	4:27
6.	"The Battered Hake Polka; Jack's Maggot"	4:08
7.	"There Was A Lady Lived in the West"	4:29
8.	"The Farmer's Cursed Wife"	4:00
9.	"Wallaby; Harry's Flowers"	4:54
10.	"The Bonny Miller; Strike A Bell"	4:46
11.	"The Golden Glove"	6:24

== Personnel ==
- Hannah James (piano accordion, vocals, clogs)
- Sam Sweeney (fiddle, viola, nyckelharpa, English Bagpipes, Hardanger Fiddle)
