= The Witches of Elswick =

- Genres: Folk
- Years active: 2001-2007
- Members: Becky Stockwell; Gillian Tolfrey; Bryony Griffith; Fay Hield

The Witches of Elswick were an English a cappella folk quartet comprising Becky Stockwell, Gillian Tolfrey, Bryony Griffith and Fay Hield. Much of their material came from traditional music of the British Isles, including ballads such as "The Two Sisters," "Lord Randall," and "Daddy Fox". They also performed more contemporary folk material, such as "Once Lived In Service" (Peter Bellamy), "Soldier, Soldier" (Peter Bellamy, based on the poem by Rudyard Kipling), and "Bring Us A Barrel" (Keith Marsden). The Witches took their name from Elswick, Tyne and Wear, where they shared a flat, and is a play on the novel and film The Witches of Eastwick.

Tolfrey (from Jarrow) and Stockwell became "drinking buddies", when Stockwell moved to Newcastle from Broadstairs in Kent. Griffith (from Huddersfield) became friends with the two of them when she moved to the area, to be with her boyfriend, a dancer in a traditional dance team, who practised at the local pub. They then started living in a flat together. When Hield (from Keighley) starting a degree course (a BMus in Folk and Traditional Music) in 2001, at Newcastle University, she moved into the flat, and the group formed later that year.

The group formed part of WitchNotes, a seven-part a cappella group, with folk musicians Grace Notes. Griffith also sings and plays fiddle in folk group The Demon Barbers, which also includes her brother Ben Griffith on drums.

Their final gig at the Cumberland Arms, Newcastle upon Tyne took place on 24 November 2007.

== Discography ==
- Out of Bed (2003)
- Hell's Belles (2005)
