= Catches and Glees =

Studio album by Hannah James and Sam Sweeney
- Released: 1 September 2009
- Genre: Folk
- Length: 39:48
- Label: RootBeat Records

Catches and Glees is the first album by folk duo Hannah James and Sam Sweeney, released in 2009.

== Track listing ==
No.	Title	Length
1.	"Gaol Song"	4:10
2.	"Ploughboy's Dream"	3:41
3.	"You Are The One"	3:53
4.	"Dick's Maggot / Dog Leap Stairs"	3:43
5.	"Died For Love"	1:23
6.	"Flaxley Green Dance / The Old Wife Of Coverdale"	3:23
7.	"Wee Weaver"	3:07
8.	"Catches and Glees / Comical Thought"	3:33
9.	"Three Ravens"	4:44
10.	"Polska"	3:52
11.	"The Young And Single Sailor"	4:19
Total length:		39:48

== Personnel ==
- Hannah James (piano accordion, vocals, clogs)
- Sam Sweeney (fiddle, viola, nyckelharpa)
