= Links (Kerfuffle album) =

Studio album by Kerfuffle
- Released: 23 February 2006
- Recorded: Winter 2005, Wickersley
- Genre: Folk
- Length: 53:03
- Label: RootBeat Records
- Producer: Kerfuffle

Kerfuffle chronology
K2 (2004)	Links (2006)	To the Ground (2008)

Professional ratings
Review scores
Source	Rating
NetRhythms	(not rated)

Links is the third album by folk band Kerfuffle.

== Track listing ==
No.	Title	Length
1.	"Intro"	1:49
2.	"Bold"	4:39
3.	"Maggot"	6:51
4.	"Hangover"	3:58
5.	"Searching For Lambs"	5:52
6.	"Light Flight"	2:35
7.	"My Heart’s In New South Wales"	4:44
8.	"Lark In The Clear Air"	4:17
9.	"Fiddle Castro"	4:24
10.	"Willow"	5.21

== Bonus tracks (Live at Priddy) ==
No.	Title	Length
12.	"Brisk"	4:01
13.	"Twisted"	4:33
Total length:		53:03

== Personnel ==
- Sam Sweeney (fiddle, djembe, Cajon, Udu)
- Hannah James (Accordion, clogging, vocals)
- Chris Thornton-Smith (Guitar)
- Tom Sweeney (Bass guitar, backing vocals)
