= K2 (Kerfuffle album) =

2005 studio album by English folk band Kerfuffle

Studio album by Kerfuffle
- Released: 7 March 2005
- Genre: Folk
- Length: 48:07
- Label: RootBeat Records
- Producer: Kerfuffle

Kerfuffle chronology
Not to Scale (2003)	K2 (2005)	Links (2006)

K2 is the second album by folk band Kerfuffle.

== Track listing ==
No.	Title	Writer(s)	Length
1.	"Dance Little Maid/Monster of Polska 2.0"	Trad./Ville Ojanen	3.38
2.	"The Great Silkie of Sule Skerry/The Old Maid of Galway"	Trad.	6.01
3.	"Speed the Plough/The Road to Ballymac/Swedish Polska"	Trad./Leslie Craig/Copyright Control	3.09
4.	"Mrs Saggs"	Chris Wood	2.57
5.	"Holland Handkerchief"	Trad.	6.34
6.	"The Orphan/Phone Call/The Milliner's Daughter/The Salvation"	Trad./Larry Unger/Trad./Simon Bradley	4.44
7.	"Ca' The Yowes"	Robert Burns	2.33
8.	"James & Lara's Wedding/Highlander's Farewell/Crazy Dog"	Marianne Campbell/Trad./Rodney Miller	3.21
9.	"O'Neill's Lament"	Trad.	6.16
10.	"Hold Back The Tide"	John Tams	6.03
11.	"Sleeping Tune/Vingarden"	Gorden Duncan/Morten Alfred Høirup	6.04
Total length:			48:07

(All tracks arranged by Kerfuffle)

== Personnel ==
- Sam Sweeney (fiddle, djembe)
- Hannah James (Accordion, piano, vocals)
- Chris Thornton-Smith (Guitar, bouzouki)
- Tom Sweeney (Bass guitar)
