= To the Ground =

Studio album by Kerfuffle
- Released: 7 July 2008
- Recorded: December 2007 – January 2008
- Genre: Folk
- Length: 48:07
- Label: RootBeat Records
- Producers: Kerfuffle, Andrew Bell

Kerfuffle chronology
| Links (2006) | To the Ground (2008) | Lighten the Dark: A Midwinter Album (2009) |

To the Ground is the fourth album by folk band Kerfuffle.

Martin Pain of Bright Young Folk described it as "excellent music, skilfully played and sung."

== Track listing ==
| No. | Title | Length |
|---|---|---|
| 1. | "Katie Shaw" | 3:43 |
| 2. | "Dr Letcher's Favourite" | 5:05 |
| 3. | "Down By The Greenwood Side" | 5:05 |
| 4. | "Rondo" | 5:58 |
| 5. | "Arise Arise" | 1:23 |
| 6. | "Castleton Carol" | 5:49 |
| 7. | "Betty Corrigall's Lament" | 5:13 |
| 8. | "The Trip" | 4:18 |
| 9. | "The Snows" | 4:00 |
| 10. | "Two Sisters" | 3:39 |
| 11. | "Bonaparte's Retreat" | 1:13 |
| 12. | "The Rogue's March" | 2:41 |
| Total length: | | 48:07 |

== Personnel ==
- Sam Sweeney (fiddle, viola, cajon, drums, bagpipes, vocals)
- Hannah James (accordion, vocals)
- Jamie Roberts (guitar, vocals, mandola, ukulele)
- Tom Sweeney (bass guitar, vocals)
- Dr Andy Lectcher (bagpipes on "Dr Letcher's Favourite")
