= Bryony Griffith =

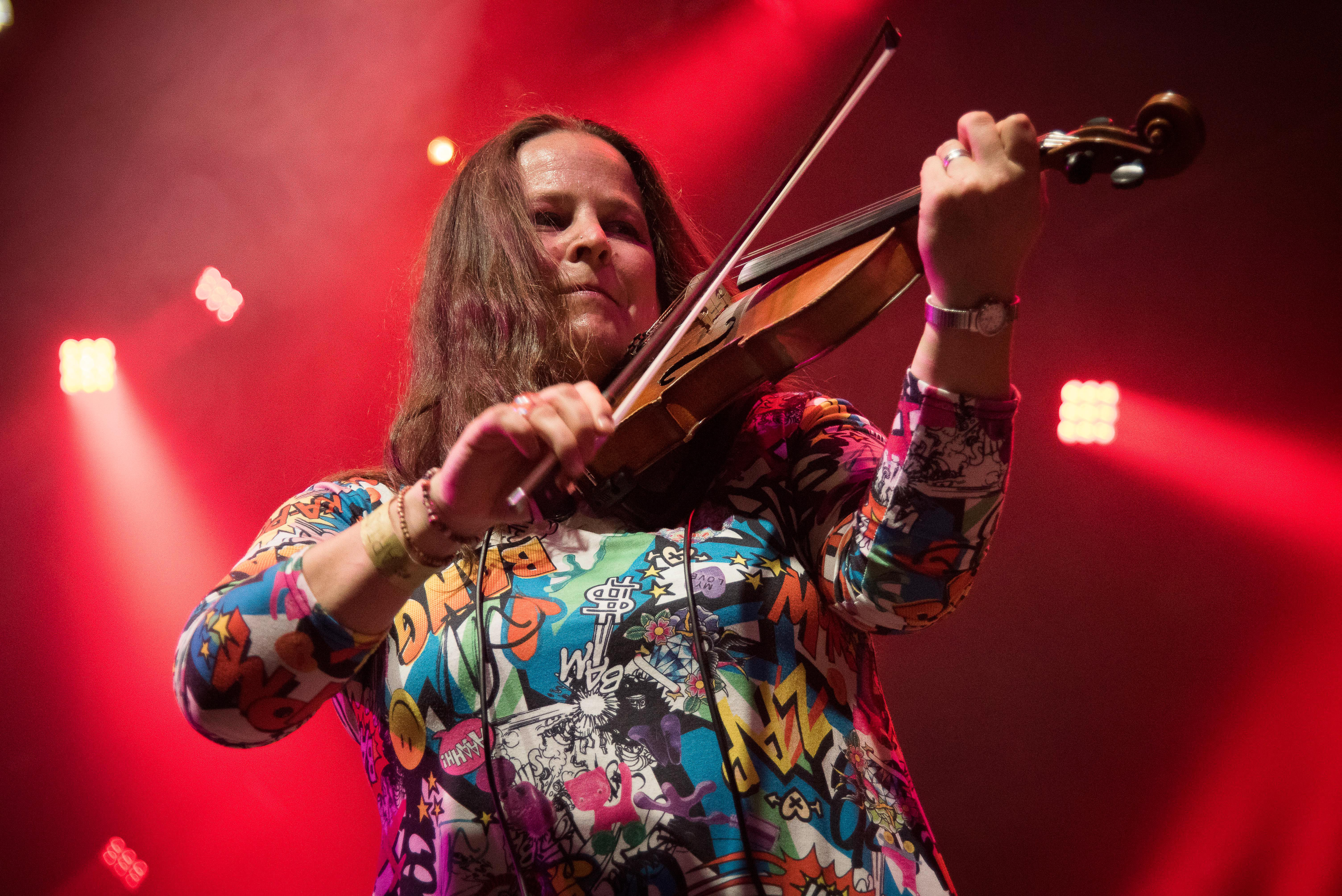
- Bryony Griffith in 2016

Background information
- Born: 1977 (age 48–49); Huddersfield, West Yorkshire, England
- Genres: traditional songs, traditional tunes
- Occupation: Musician
- Instruments: Violin, piano, voice, viola
- Years active: 1993–present
- Website: http://bryonygriffith.com/

Bryony Griffith (born 1977) is an English fiddle player and singer, specialising in English traditional songs and tunes. She is best known for her work with the Demon Barbers and a cappella quartet Witches of Elswick.

== Early life ==
Griffith was born into a musical family, learning the piano alongside the violin. She was educated at King James's School, Almondbury, followed by Greenhead College, and studied French and Spanish at University of Hull. In her early teens, she joined the ceilidh band Bedlam and played in folk music venues and festivals around the United Kingdom. As part of her degree, she spent a year in Vannes, Brittany, teaching English and studying traditional Breton music. She later became a musician for Dog Rose Morris dancers and The Newcastle Kingsmen rapper dance team. With Dog Rose Morris, she appeared on the BBC programme Later…With Jools Holland.

== Career ==
In 2000 Griffith relocated to Newcastle upon Tyne, and flat-shared with Becky Graham (née Stockwell) and Gillian Tolfrey. A year later they were joined by Fay Hield. All four had a background in traditional music, and Hield and Tolfrey studied at the University of Newcastle's recently set up traditional music degree scheme. Against this background, they formed a cappella quartet Witches of Elswick. Two albums followed – Out of Bed in 2003 and Hells Belles in 2005 – and a seven-piece collaboration with a cappella trio Grace Notes (entitled Witchnotes) was an occasional concern. By 2005, core members – including Griffith – had moved away from Newcastle upon Tyne and the group did a final tour in 2007. Witchnotes continued to make occasional festival appearances until 2008.

The Demon Barbers, with Griffith in their ranks alongside fellow Bedlam member Will Hampson (melodeon), formed in 2001. The group are known for fusing traditional folk instruments with drums and electric bass guitar, and energetic live performances (as The Demon Barber Roadshow) showcasing traditional dance styles in theatrical styles. As a core original member, Griffith has featured on their recordings Uncut (2002), Waxed (2005), +24db ep (2008), The Adventures of Captain Ward (2010) and Disco at the Tavern (2015), taken part in live shows Time Gentlemen Please, The Lock In and DBXL, and won the Best Live Act award at the BBC Radio 2 Folk Awards in 2009. The band were also nominated for the same award in 2011.

Away from band duties, Griffith released a duo album with now-husband Hampson in 2011 (Lady Diamond), which received five star reviews and won Best Debut at the 2012 Spiral Earth Awards. She also recorded her debut solo album Nightshade, which was released in 2014 and featured solo fiddle tunes and songs with sparse backing. The album was one of the Top 10 Folk Treats in The Daily Telegraph and a runner-up in the 2014 fRoots Critics Albums of the Year. A follow up, Hover, featuring Griffith's take on traditional English fiddle tunes, was released in 2018.

In addition to performing, Griffith leads music, singing and dance workshops all over the United Kingdom, both at folk festivals and summer schools. She runs and arranges music for The Shepley Singers, a mixed-voice community choir performing traditional songs, and teaches violin in Yorkshire schools.

Other projects have included The Full English learning programme with The EFDSS and the National Coal Mining Museum at Shawlands Primary School in Barnsley and The Full English Extra with EFDSS, The NCMME, Wakefield Music Services and schools in the ex-mining town of Featherstone in West Yorkshire. The Full English project was nominated for Best Musical Initiative Award at the 2015 Music Teacher Awards for Excellence and in March 2016 the EFDSS resource bank won the Best Digital/Technological resource at the Music Teacher Awards.

In 2017 Griffith joined Paul Sartin, Jim Causley and Jackie Oates to produce The Wanton Seed, a concert series celebrating the reissue of the song books Marrowbones (EFDSS 2007) and The Wanton Seed (2015) and mark the launch of Southern Harvest the new omnibus edition of The Foggy Dew and The Constant Lovers. She also collaborated with Horse and Bamboo Theatre and musicians Kate Locksley, Ewan McLennan and John Kirkpatrick to produce Theatre Ballads, a piece blending historic ballads with puppetry and illustration, and became a Musician in Residence at the National Coal Mining Museum for England, Yorkshire, as part of an EFDSS scheme. She has become a senior lecturer on the BA (Hons) Music (Folk) degree course at Leeds College of Music, which took its first students in September 2018.

== Partial discography ==
With Bedlam

- 1994 Bus Stop (Selwyn Music SYNMC 0001)
- 1995 Fair Field, No Favour (Selwyn Music SYNMC 0002)
- 1997 Four Play (Selwyn Music SYNMCD0003)
- 2000 Evolution of the Lazy Tongue (Selwyn Music SYNMCD0004)

With Witches of Elswick

- 2003 Out of Bed (Fellside FECD180)
- 2005 Hell's Belles (Selwyn SYNMCD0006)

With Demon Barbers

- 2002 Uncut (DJC Records DJC019)
- 2005 Waxed (DJC Records DJC026)
- 2008 +24db ep (Demon Barber Sound DBS001)
- 2010 The Adventures of Captain Ward (Demon Barber Sound DBS003)
- 2015 Disco at the Tavern (Demon Barber Sound DBS006)

With Rachel Unthank & The Winterset

- 2005 Cruel Sister (Rabble Rouser)

With Alice Jones

- 2022 A Year Too Late and a Month Too Soon (Splid Records SPLIDCD29)
- 2023 Wesselbobs (Selwyn Music SYNMCD0010)

With various artists

- 2004 Great Grandson of Morris On (Talking Elephant TECD062)

As Bryony Griffith and Will Hampson

- 2011 Lady Diamond (Selwyn Music SYNMCD0007)

As soloist

- 2014 Nightshade (Selwyn Music SYNMCD0008)
- 2018 Hover (Selwyn Music SYNMC0009)
