= H.O.M.E.-Studios =

Recording-studio complex in Hamburg, Germany

Coordinates: 53.5747°N 9.9729°E

H.O.M.E. Studios ("House Of Music & Entertainment") is the largest recording-studio complex in Hamburg, Germany. The founder and owner of H.O.M.E. Studios is German music producer and songwriter Franz Plaza. H.O.M.E. Studios has been situated in the middle of Hamburg's Eimsbuttel-District since the 1980s.

== History ==
The studio's original name, Château du Pape, was changed in 1998, after Plaza acquired and reconfigured it. H.O.M.E. released productions for bands including Echt and Selig, as well as recordings and productions for Udo Lindenberg, Nena, and Rammstein.

Productions for Eminem, Mariah Carey, Xavier Naidoo, Herbert Grönemeyer, Lauryn Hill, as well as part of the album Songs of Faith and Devotion by Depeche Mode, were recorded and engineered there.

== Related firms ==
H.O.M.E. Studios produces artists for its record label, Bring Me Home; manages rights for its publishing company, Ponk; and acts as an agent for local, national and international corporate events.

== Staff ==
The H.O.M.E. Studios team includes Plaza; audio-engineer Peter Schmidt (Peter Fox, Reamonn, Beatsteaks); producer and songwriter Philip Schwarz (Eli f, Fayzen, Cäthe); and Benny Dernhoff (KRIS (Revolver held), Nico Suave, Ken Kenay).

== Equipment ==
Facilities include space for pre- and post-production as well as two large studios with separate recording and control rooms. Both studios are equipped with mixing consoles by Solid State Logic (9080J Series and Duality SE). Control room 1 and its monitoring system were specially designed for H.O.M.E. Studios by Roger Quested. The recording-room counterpart was designed by acoustician Wolfgang Jensen. Connected are two 9-cubic-meter tile and mirror rooms, offering unique acoustic reflection and customizable sound and recording possibilities.
