= Hannah James and Sam Sweeney =

English folk duo

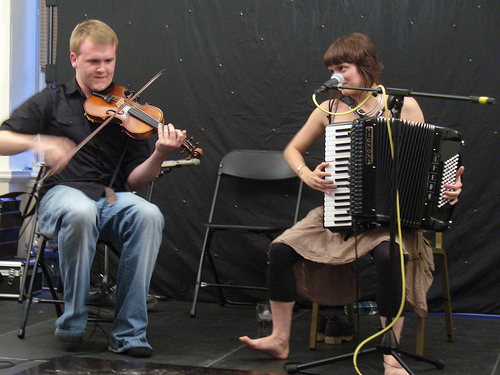
- James and Sweeney performing at Sidmouth Festival, 2009.

Background information
- Genres: Folk
- Years active: 2009–2014
- Labels: RootBeat Records
- Past members: Hannah James; Sam Sweeney

Hannah James and Sam Sweeney were an English folk duo, comprising Hannah James (piano accordion, vocals, clogs) and Sam Sweeney (violin, viola, octave viola, English bagpipes, nyckelharpa, Hardanger fiddle).

== History ==
Hannah James and Sam Sweeney had been playing together for many years as part of the band Kerfuffle, but only officially became a duo in 2009.

In 2010 they were nominated for the BBC Radio 2 folk award, 'Horizon Award'. Also in 2010, they won the 'Best Newcomers' at the Hancock Awards.

At the 2013 folk awards they were nominated for 'Best Duo' and Sweeney was nominated for 'Musician of the Year'.

They ceased performing as a duo in mid-2014.

== Discography ==
- Catches and Glees (2009)
- State and Ancientry (April, 2012)
