= The Laily Worm and the Machrel of the Sea =

Traditional song

"The Laily Worm and the Machrel of the Sea" (Roud 3968, Child 36) is an English-language folk song. 'Machrel' is an archaic spelling of 'mackerel', the type of fish, and title can be spelled either way.

== Synopsis ==
A young man, transformed into a laily (loathly, or loathsome) worm, tells his story: his father married an evil woman as his stepmother, and she transformed him into a worm and his sister into a mackerel. His sister combed his hair every Saturday. He has killed seven knights, and if the man he was speaking to was not his father, he would be the eighth.

His father sends for the stepmother, who claims his children are at court. He makes her use her silver wand to turn his son back, and then her magic horn to summon the fish, although the daughter holds back rather than let the stepmother transform her again.

The father burns the stepmother at the stake.

== Motifs ==
This ballad has motifs in common with "The Laidly Worm of Spindleston Heugh", "Kemp Owyne", and more with "Allison Gross", but is an independent one, and a traditional one, unretouched by literary forms.

The sister can comb the hair in "Allison Gross" because she still has her human form; Francis James Child believed that part of the original tale has been lost, in which she could assume her human form again for part of the week.

The horn has a logical plot function in this tale, unlike "Allison Gross". It is psychologically sound that the fish wishes to avoid her stepmother, but that plot twist leaves her still a fish; Child believed that, here, also, part of the tale was lost.

== See also ==
- List of the Child Ballads
- Laidly Worm of Spindleston Heugh
