= The Laidly Worm of Spindleston Heugh =

Northumbrian ballad

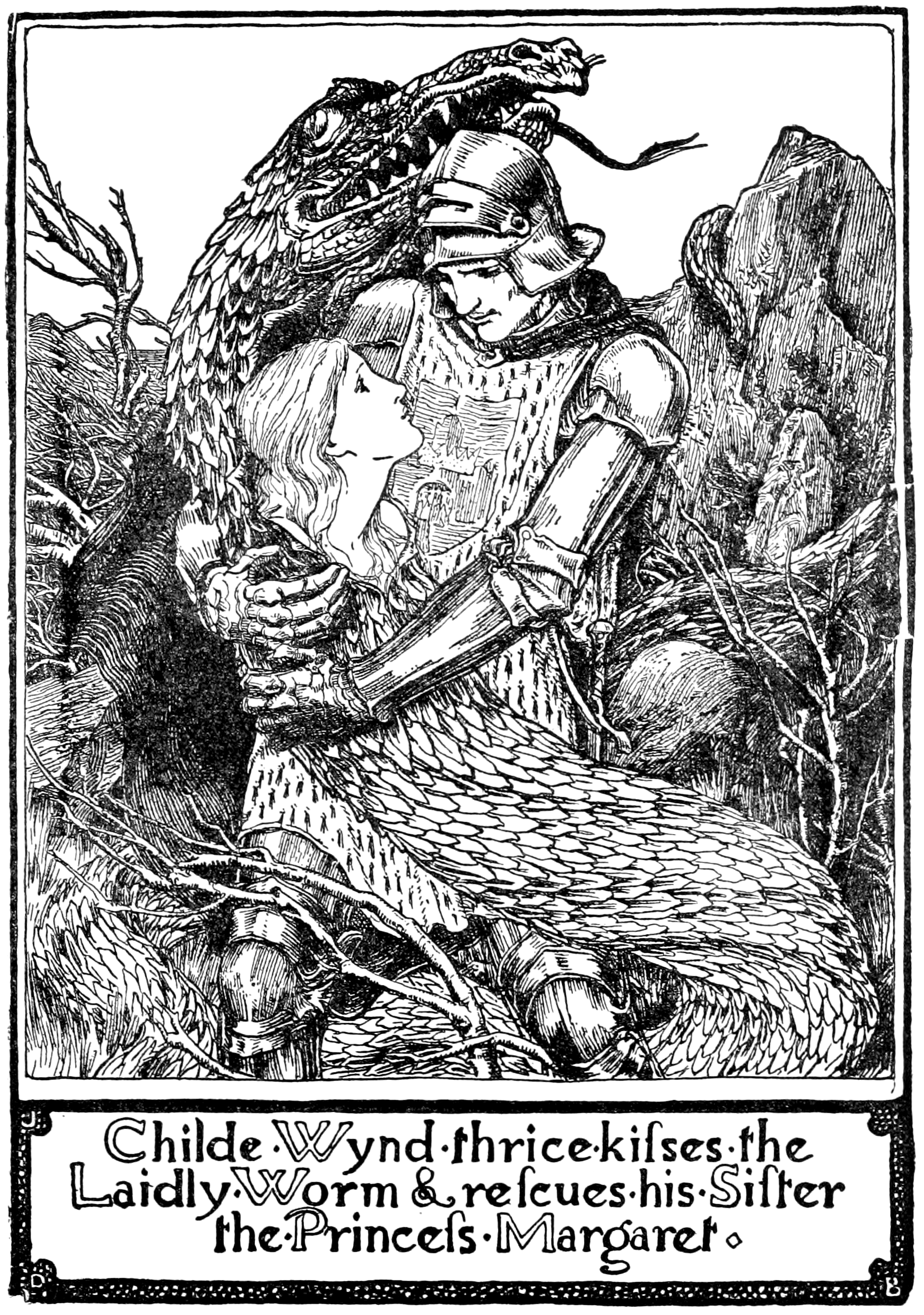
Childe Wynd thrice kisses the laidly worm, John D. Batten, 1890

The Laidly Worm of Spindleston Heugh, also known as The Laidly Worm of Bamborough, is a Northumbrian ballad about a princess who is changed into a dragon (the "laidly worm" of the title).

== Synopsis ==
In the Kingdom of Northumbria, a kind king in Bamburgh Castle takes a beautiful but cruel witch as his queen after his wife's death. The King's son, Childe Wynd, has gone across the sea and the witch, jealous of the beauty of the king’s daughter, Princess Margaret, and quick to take advantage of Wynd’s absence, turns her into a dragon. The enchantment used is usually:

I weird ye to be a Laidly Worm,
And borrowed shall ye never be,
Until Childe Wynd, the King's own son
Come to the Heugh and thrice kiss thee;
Until the world comes to an end,
Borrowed shall ye never be.

Later in the story, the prince returns and, instead of fighting the dragon, kisses it, restoring the princess to her natural form. He then turns the witch-queen into a toad and becomes king.

== Variants ==
The ballad was first published in 1778 in a compilation of folk songs. The ballad was said to have been transcribed by the Reverend Robert Lambe, the Vicar of Norham, from a latin manuscript "made by the old mountain-bard, Duncan Frasier, living on Cheviot, A.D. 1270", although is now thought to have been a forgery by Lambe, drawing on local stories. In Joseph Jacob's version, the dragon Princess Margaret is appeased by putting aside seven cows for her per day. The prince, her brother, hears of it and comes for her despite his stepmother's attempt to keep him away.

The first studio recording of the ballad was sung by Owen Brannigan. The version sung was arranged by Vilém Tauský as an abridged narrative, having 10 verses as opposed to the original's 38 verses.

== Location ==
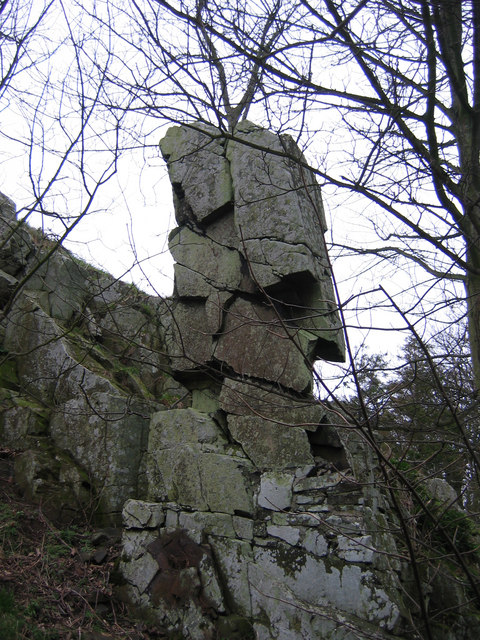
The Spindlestone or Bridle Rock on Spindlestone Heughs.

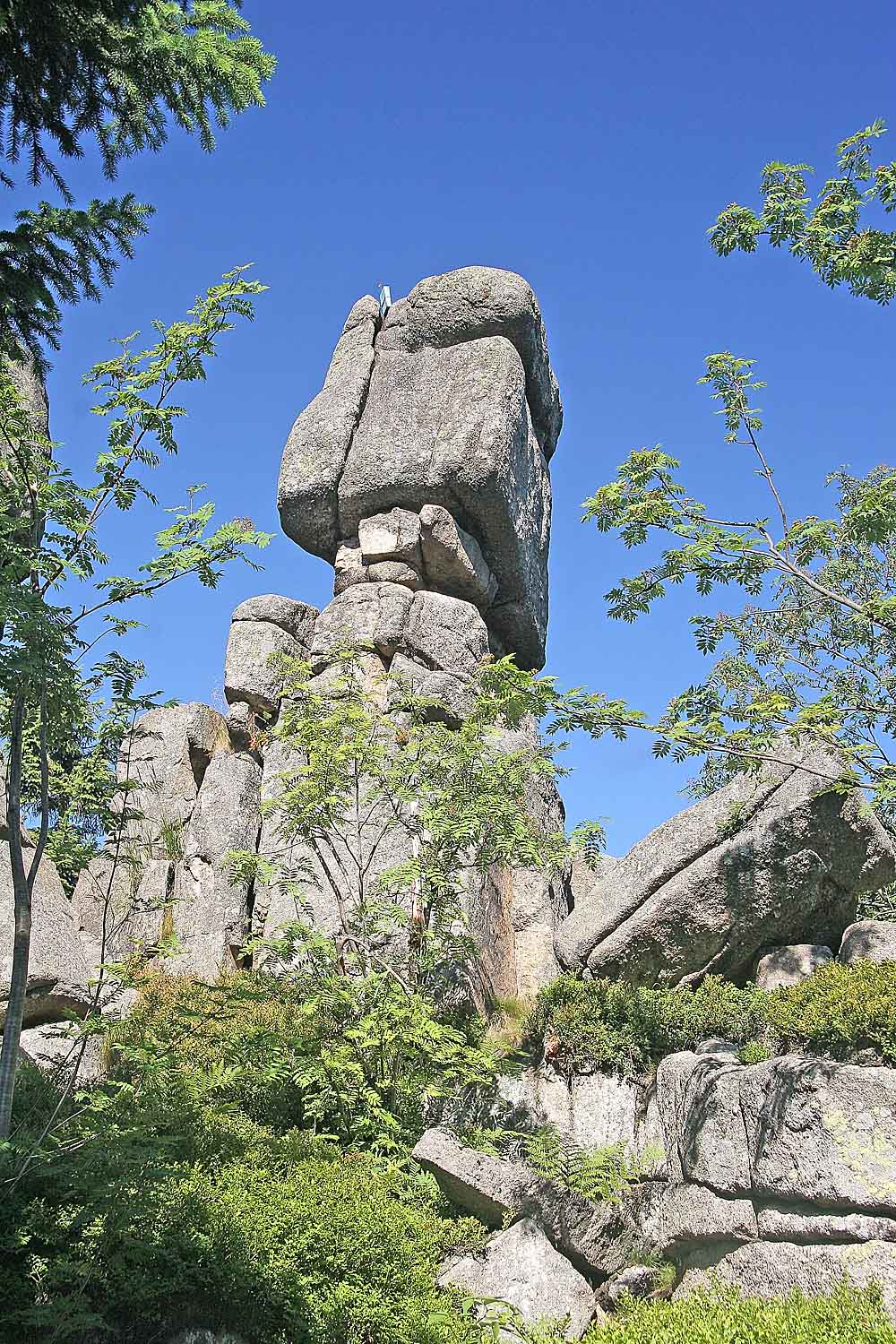
An example of the remarkably similar geological feature known in Czech as Sněžné věžičky (= "Snow turret"), Jizera Mountains, border between Czech Republic and Poland

Spindlestone Heugh (or Heughs) is a dolerite crag on the Great Whin Sill escarpment in the parish of Easington, Northumberland. The Spindlestone itself is a natural stone column standing out from the crag, which is also known as "Bridle Rock". According to a local legend, Child Wynd threw his horse's bridle over the rock before tackling the worm. The ballad describes a cave and a stone trough used by the worm; a feature below the crag is marked "Laidley Worm's Trough" by the Ordnance Survey, but the nearby "Laidley Worm's Cave" was destroyed by quarrying in the 19th century.

== Origins ==
The story has a lot in common with the Icelandic Hjálmþés saga ok Ölvis.

The Laidly Worm never made it into the "Reliques" but was reprinted in various other books after its discovery. Lambe sent the fragments to his friend Thomas Percy, Bishop of Dromore, another antiquarian. Percy had embarked on a British Empire-spanning project to collect all the oral and written lore and ballads, which he assembled into a volume called Reliques of Ancient English Poetry.

== See also ==
- Kemp Owyne – a Child Ballad version of the tale, in which Childe Wynd is replaced by Kemp Owyne
- Lambton Worm
- Loathly lady
- The Laily Worm and the Machrel of the Sea

== Sources ==
- Atkinson, Philip Folk Tales of North East England (https://viewbook.at/FolkTalesEngland)
- Henderson, Joan. The Laidly Worm of Bamborough. 1991.
- http://www.ferrum.edu/thanlon/dragons/collect.htm
