= Songs of Faith and Devotion =

1993 studio album by Depeche Mode

Studio album by Depeche Mode
- Released: 22 March 1993
- Recorded: February 1992 – January 1993
- Studios: Madrid; Château du Pape (Hamburg); Olympic (London)
- Genres: Alternative rock; electronic rock; grunge
- Length: 47:30
- Label: Mute
- Producers: Depeche Mode; Flood

Depeche Mode chronology
Violator (1990)	Songs of Faith and Devotion (1993)	Songs of Faith and Devotion Live (1993)

Singles from Songs of Faith and Devotion
- 1. "I Feel You" Released: 15 February 1993; 2. "Walking in My Shoes" Released: 26 April 1993; 3. "Condemnation" Released: 13 September 1993; 4. "In Your Room" Released: 10 January 1994

Songs of Faith and Devotion is the eighth studio album by the English electronic music band Depeche Mode. It was first released on 22 March 1993 in the United Kingdom by Mute Records and a day later in the United States by Sire Records and Reprise Records. The album incorporated a more aggressive, darker rock-oriented tone than its predecessor Violator (1990), largely influenced by the emerging alternative rock and grunge scenes in the United States.

A fan posted the album in its entirety online a few months before the album's official release, representing one of the first music leaks in the music industry. Upon its release, Songs of Faith and Devotion reached number one in several countries, and became the first Depeche Mode album to debut atop the charts in both the UK and the US. It became one of the band's best-selling albums, with sales over 5,000,000 worldwide. To support the album, Depeche Mode embarked on the fourteen-month-long two-legged Devotional Tour, the largest tour they had undertaken to date. Live recordings from the tour were released on the concert video Devotional and live album Songs of Faith and Devotion Live, both released in late 1993.

The album was recorded while lead singer Dave Gahan was suffering from a heroin addiction, and the album and subsequent tour exacerbated growing tensions and difficulties within the band, prompting Alan Wilder to quit Depeche Mode in June 1995. This album is the final one with Wilder as a band member, and also the final Depeche Mode album to be recorded as a quartet. The ordeal had exhausted their creative output following the enormous success they had enjoyed with Violator, leading to rumours and media speculation that the band would split. Depeche Mode subsequently recovered from the experience, and released Ultra in 1997.

== Background ==
Depeche Mode had released their previous album Violator in early 1990 and had supported it with a world tour that lasted through the end of that year. The band, coming off the "peak high" of their successful album and tour, wanted to take a year off before returning to work together.

During the tour, singer Dave Gahan's father had died, and after the tour, he stayed in London for a few months, later saying in an interview with Q magazine that "that's where my [drug] habit got completely out of hand." Gahan elaborated, "It's no secret I've been drinking and using drugs for a long time – probably since I was about 12; popping a couple of my mum's phenobarbitones every now and then; hash; amphetamines; coke came along. Alcohol was always there, hand in hand with drugs. Then all of a sudden I discovered heroin". After that stay in London, Gahan split from his wife Joanne Fox Gahan and young son and moved to Los Angeles to live with his new girlfriend, Teresa Conroy. Gahan and Conroy had met in 1988 when she was the Press Liaison officer for the American leg of their Music for the Masses Tour. Gahan would later say, "I felt really safe in my life in England in lots of ways, and I didn't like it. There I was with a loving, caring wife, a new baby a big house in the country, a couple of cars in the drive, and it just didn't feel right. I wanted to move to California, but Joanne didn't want to." For most of 1991, Gahan had barely any contact with the rest of the band, as he was living in LA with his new girlfriend, and both were enjoying the rock and roll lifestyle. Said Gahan later, "I actually thought, 'There's no fucking rock stars out there anymore. There's nobody willing to go the whole way to do this.' ... So, I dragged by body through the mud, to show that I could do it." Gahan and Conroy "set off on a path of Sid and Nancy-style heroin-led narcotic excess." They started to listen to, and often hang out with, some of the harder rock bands of the time, including Jane's Addiction, Rage Against the Machine, and grunge-era bands like Nirvana, Pearl Jam and Alice in Chains. When Gahan did finally fly to London, to see his son, he ran into his former producer Daniel Miller, who immediately recognised that Gahan was turning into a junkie. Said Miller, "I hadn't seen him for a few months and he looked a classic junkie. He was skinny, he looked terrible. ... He used to do this great impression of a wasted rock star and here he was – he'd become that impersonation, even down to the fact that his problem was so obvious, but he was trying to conceal it from me." At the same time, Gahan and his wife Joanne started a "messy" divorce that took most of the year.

During 1991, band member Alan Wilder recorded his Recoil album Bloodline (1992) and collaborated with the band Nitzer Ebb by remixing a song for their EP As Is (1991) and co-producing their album Ebbhead (1991). In August, Wilder married his long-time girlfriend, Jeri Young.

Songwriter Martin Gore considered working on a new solo album to follow up his 1989 solo effort Counterfeit EP, but he and his partner Suzanne Boisvert instead had a daughter in June, with Gore saying "that had a really positive effect on me. ... You see a life being born and growing, it's just wonderful, it moves you."

In August, bandmate Andy Fletcher had a child with his partner Grainne Mullen, and around the same time he opened a restaurant, Gascogne, in north-west London.

In mid-1991, the band were lured back into the studio to record a new track, titled "Death's Door", for Wim Wenders' upcoming new film, Until the End of the World (1991). Although billed as a full-band effort, Gahan chose not to fly to London to record the vocals, preferring to stay in Los Angeles, so Gore sang vocals for the song instead.

In late 1991, Gore had demos of new songs ready to share with the rest of the band, and they agreed to meet up in early 1992 to start the recording sessions for their new material.

== Recording ==
=== Demos ===
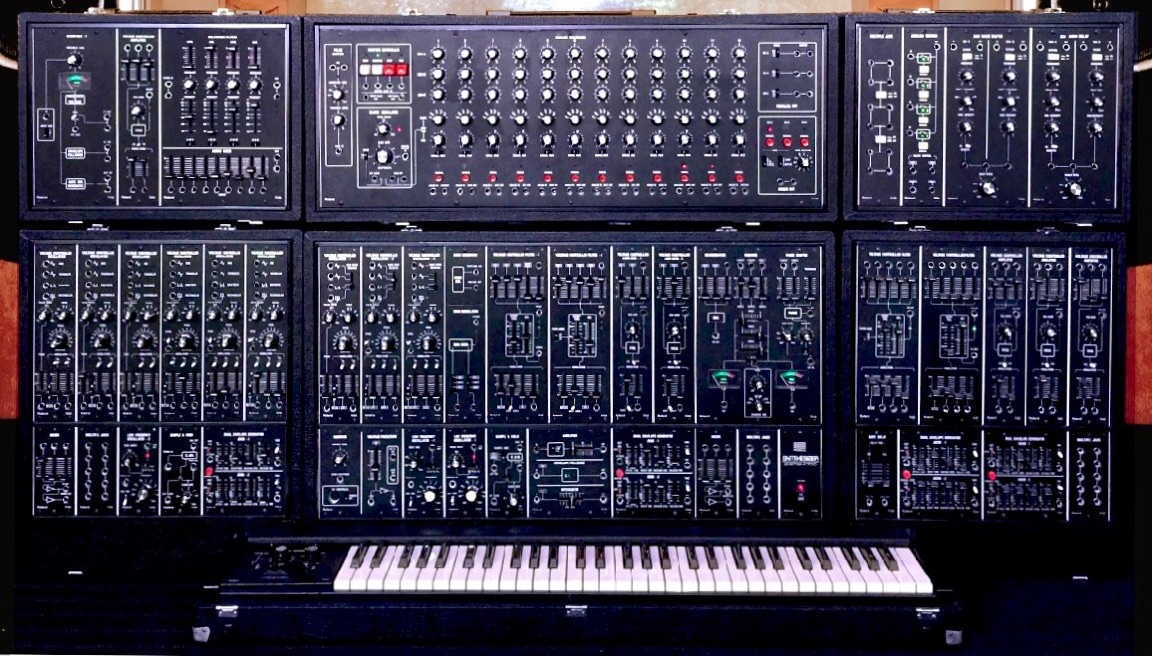
A Roland System 700, like the one used to record songs for the album.

Gore brought in demos for everyone to hear, and Flood said that they felt like they had a good set of songs to work from. When Gore shared his demos of "I Feel You" and "Condemnation" with the rest of the band, Gahan was happy to hear that they were bluesier and rockier than he had expected. Said Gahan, "It was a total relief! I was so glad Martin [Gore] was moving away from the dance-music formula," and "the lyrics were completely appropriate to the way I was feeling. It was almost like Mart was writing the stuff for me." As Gahan had been spending a year with rock bands in LA, he wanted Depeche Mode's new record to be more rock-oriented. He said, "None of us came back with the idea that we were going to make Violator 2." Gore was feeling tremendous pressure as the group's songwriter, coming off the success of Violator. Fletcher reminded Gore that he works better under pressure, and Miller tried to put the band at ease, saying that if their follow-up was even half as successful as Violator, it would still be considered a success.

=== Madrid sessions ===
To start recording, the band wanted to rent a studio in Madrid, Spain, but was unable to locate a suitable one. The band chose to record in Spain because "it wasn't in Italy and Denmark", where the band had recorded much of their material over the previous few years. Co-producer Flood, who had worked with the band on Violator and was returning for the new album, had just worked with rock band U2 on their album Achtung Baby. He had seen U2 produce a great album by working and living together for several weeks, and so suggested that approach to the band, saying that they could also rent a house and convert it into a working studio space. Despite having done something similar for the recording of their album Black Celebration in 1985–86 and having seen tensions rise within the group, the band agreed with Flood's suggestion. A villa about thirty miles from Madrid was rented for a few months starting in January 1992. Steve Lyon, who was the sound engineer for the album, arrived in January to start setting up the space for recording. As the villa wasn't designed for recording, Lyon chose rooms "ad hoc" to be production or recording rooms. A studio was set up in the basement of the villa, with two drum kits using different spaces to achieve different sounds. The recordings from the kits could then be processed through synthesizers, such as the large Roland System 700 the band had shipped to Madrid.

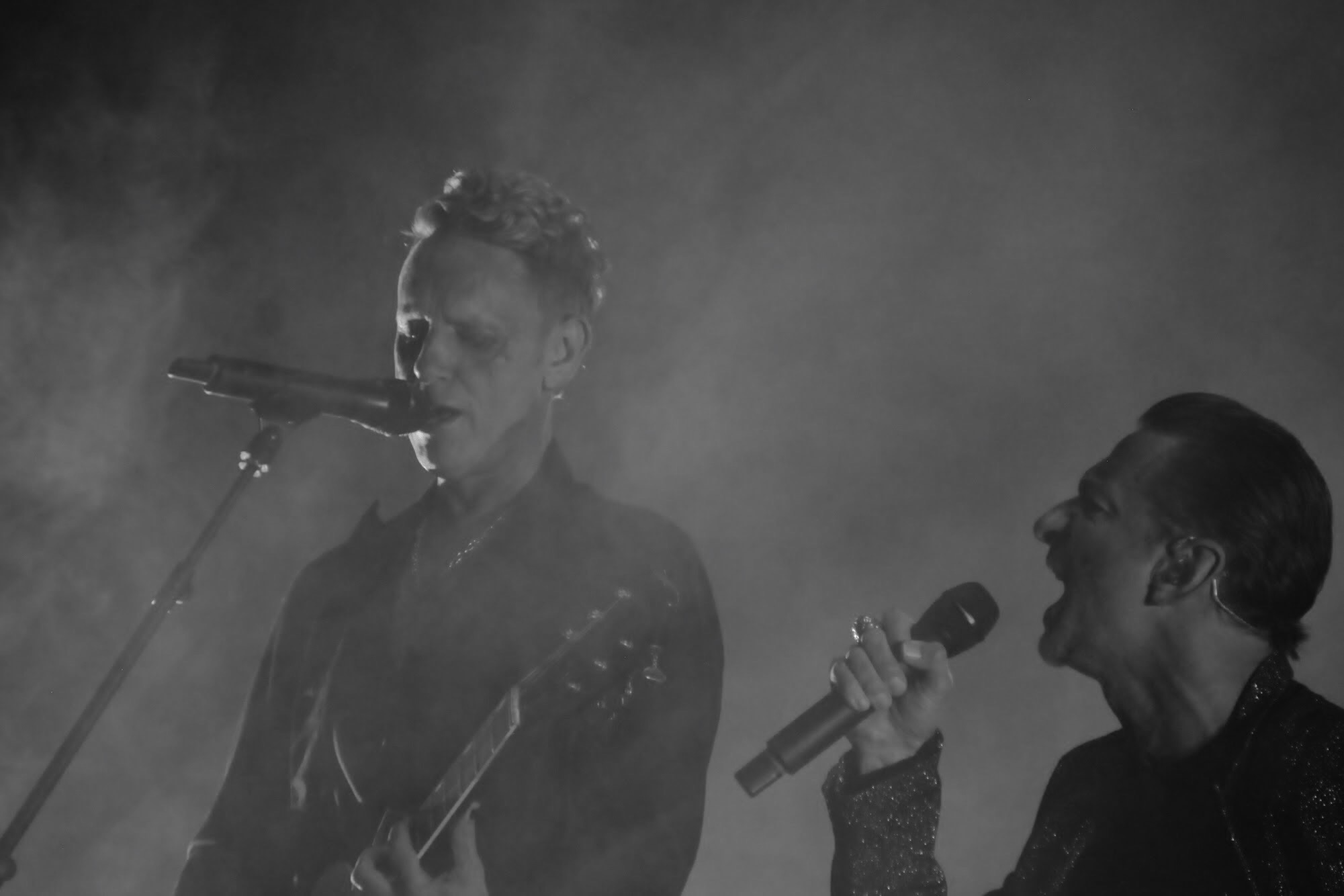
Martin Gore (left) and Dave Gahan (right) pictured on stage in 2017. Gore wrote all the songs on Songs of Faith and Devotion, singing lead vocals on two of them. Gahan sang lead vocals on all the other tracks.

In February 1992, the band arrived to begin recording. Initially, recording time was set up in two six-week blocks, with a four-week break in between. The band had barely seen each other for a year, and the day before the sessions started, they met for the first time as a group at a bar in Madrid, and were all surprised to see how Gahan had changed. Gore said "I was a bit confused by it all at first, because we hadn't seen him for a while when we started recording Songs of Faith and Devotion. Suddenly his hair had grown drastically, and he was covered in loads of tattoos." Fletcher described what he saw as "a real massive change." Wilder summed it up by saying "He looked like he'd been living in LA for a year." Gahan would later say that "I'd changed, but I didn't really understand it until I came face to face with Al [Wilder], Mart [Gore] and Fletch. The look on their faces ... battered me."

Unlike for their previous albums, the band decided to forgo their usual pre-production time, where collectively they would have listened to the demos created by Gore and then suggest ideas to establish a creative framework. Flood later called the lack of pre-production a big mistake that adversely affected the early recording sessions. Gahan, influenced by the scene in Los Angeles, wanted to make harder music, also like he'd heard from Nine Inch Nails or Nitzer Ebb, bands that in his words "had a kind of harder and bluesier edge to them. I felt like I wanted that at the time – I wanted to rock!" Wilder agreed that they wanted to do something different, saying "we needed to push the boundaries a bit, and try and do something completely different to Violator. I'm sure, subconsciously, there was a big pressure to repeat that success, and the obvious thing to do would have been to make a very similar record. None of us really wanted to do that, and I think particularly Flood, Dave [Gahan] and myself wanted to make it as different as we could, and surprise people with it." As a result, according to Wilder again, "After some discussion between myself, Flood and the others, we agreed that our approach should be more towards performance whilst trying to push ourselves into areas we hadn't explored. Some of the songs like 'I Feel You', 'In Your Room' and 'Rush' suggested a looser, more 'live' feel and it's probably fair to say that myself, Flood and Dave [Gahan] were the main instigators of this open and fluid sound. This more performance–based style of working threw its own spanner in the works which some of us found hard to come to terms with." This desire to make a rock record led to creative differences within the band, with Miller suggesting that Fletcher was the one who found this new way of working hardest to deal with, despite his very limited role in the creative process. Said Wilder, "I suppose the emphasis is much more on performing on this record, but once that performance was created, we applied all the technology we've come to know and love over the years to put it together in a way that's still uniquely Depeche Mode."

With no pre-production for the material, the band resorted to jam sessions with guitars and drums, which led to frustration, especially since Gahan himself would rarely participate. Said Wilder, "Dave [Gahan] had clearly deteriorated. He occasionally surfaced to sing a couple of takes or offer a few words of encouragement, and then he'd disappear again." Gahan said, "I was so 'out there' that I didn't notice anything. I was painting in my room. I would come down sporadically with bursts of creative emotion, then I'd go back to my room again." Wilder discovered some of Gahan's drug paraphernalia early on, leading to an attempted intervention by the band, with Gore telling him, "You've got to sort yourself out; you're putting yourself in danger," which Gahan brushed off. Gore said that, "although he [Gahan] was addicted to heroin, and most of the time wasn't there, he was fantastic as soon as he came into the studio and sang." At the same time, Fletcher was struggling with depression, which he had been fighting with for a few years.

Wilder said that it was obvious that the group were suffering somehow, both in a difficult coming together and also having to deal with the pressure of the success of Violator and its tour two years before. Additionally, the band had forgotten one of the lessons they had learned over the past decade of making albums: fewer people in the control room. Said Wilder, "We forgot all about this at the start of the Madrid sessions, and actually magnified the problem by not only constructing a home studio, but also living together in the same environment for twelve weeks. This was a disaster, and I hated it! You couldn't escape for one minute, and the vibe reached an all-time low." Fletcher described the band living together as "claustrophobic", and the lack of a break from each other as a factor in contributing to the stress.

When Miller arrived in Madrid a week into the sessions, he could tell things were going awry:

It was obvious what the problem was. They'd spent time apart, they'd all gone through quite big changes in their lives, some of them had had kids in that period, and there wasn't that natural coming together any more. I walked into the house and it was the worst vibe. Everyone seemed to be in their own little space and nobody was relating to each other at all. ... it's not an untypical scene in a studio but usually it's three months in, not one week. You'd expect a bustle of activity but they had burned out before they'd even started.

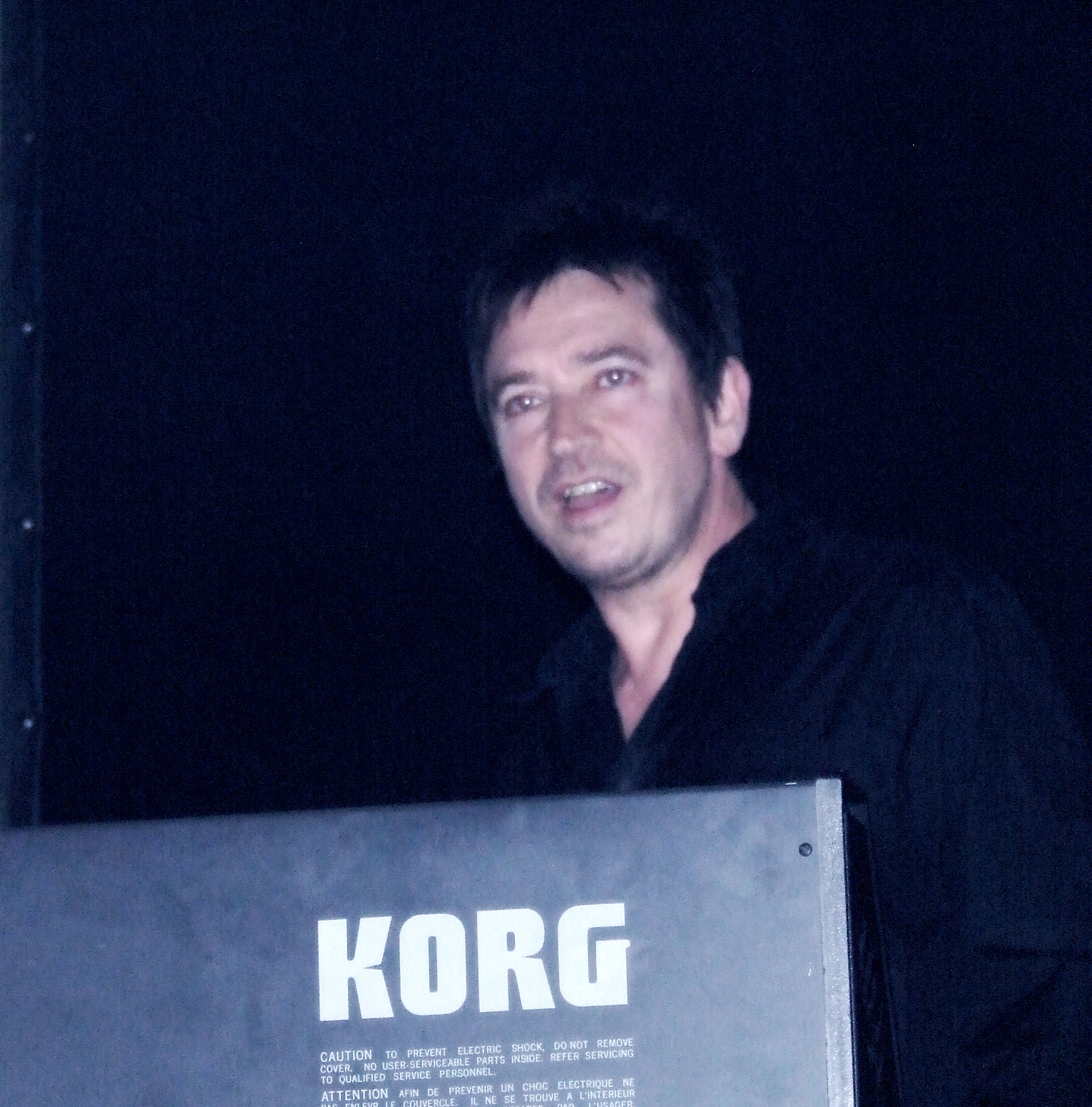
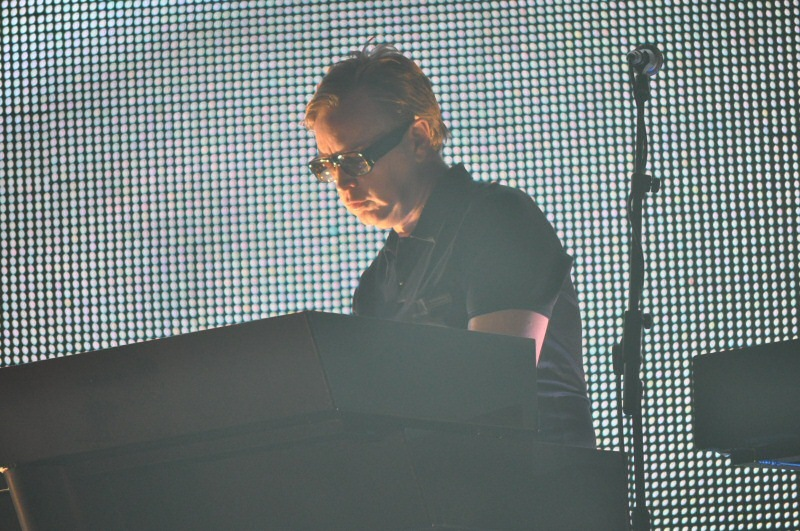
Band members Alan Wilder (left) and Andy Fletcher (right), both pictured in 2010.

Due to these frustrations, the first six-week recording session was largely unusable, which Wilder described as "a complete fucking waste of time" in a sarcastic toast to Flood at the airport on their way back home. The lack of progress increasingly frustrated everyone involved. Flood compared the collective effort of Violator where the band would contribute as a whole, and while there were disagreements, it was in recognition that it was for a greater good, whereas in the making of Songs of Faith and Devotion, the band members were highly adamant of their own individual ideas, leading to considerable tension. Flood described the atmosphere as "like pulling teeth" and emotionally draining. Gore, Gahan, and Miller shared his sentiments, unfavourably comparing the stale atmosphere of the recording of Songs of Faith and Devotion to the party-like atmosphere of creating Violator a few years earlier. Despite the difficulties, the band was able to start developing several songs during the early Madrid sessions, including "One Caress", "Walking in My Shoes", "Condemnation" and "I Feel You". During the break halfway through the Madrid sessions, Wilder wrote in a "Questions and Answers" section for the Bong Depeche Mode fan magazine that "we're in Madrid. We've done some rehearsing there. We're going back there soon to do another period and then we'll be moving on to some other places later in the year, yet to be decided."

Wilder focused on the work, and didn't socialise with the rest of the band outside of the villa. Partly this was due to Gahan's behaviour, which was becoming more erratic, including occasions where Gahan would pick fights with people on the street or in bars. Wilder said "[Gahan] caused another incident, totally unprovoked, in a Madrid nightclub by insulting a group of Hells Angels, which resulted in a street brawl." Despite this, Wilder later praised Gahan's role during the Songs of Faith and Devotion sessions, stating that on previous releases, Gahan's studio contribution was often only his vocal performance, but during these sessions, Gahan often offered a lot of positive encouragement, and Wilder's creative differences with Gore were actually the real source of the tension in the band.

In April 1992, during the four-week break between recording sessions in Madrid, Gahan returned to the US and married his girlfriend Teresa Conroy at a ceremony in Las Vegas; none of the other members of the band attended the wedding.

=== Hamburg sessions ===
In August, the band relocated to Château du Pape Studio in Hamburg, Germany. Wilder said that the atmosphere within the group was "much better" in Hamburg, since they were working in a "normal" studio environment, and could leave at the end of the day. However, Fletcher skipped the sessions entirely, disliking the mood and disagreements he saw during the sessions in Madrid, and checked himself into Priory Hospital in London. There were still disagreements, however, with Flood noting that compared to the Violator sessions, the sessions for Songs of Faith and Devotion were more "confrontational", where no decision was made without someone disagreeing. Wilder said that, with Fletcher gone and Gahan only occasionally participating, he, Gore and Flood were able to make a lot of progress, saying "we recorded eight tracks in six weeks [in Hamburg], compared to the two or three we'd scraped together in Madrid." Gore suggested that Fletcher's absence improved Wilder's mood, as the two of them never got along very well: "that's probably why Alan [Wilder] cheered up and started coming out – he was out with us every night!" Gore was still drinking a lot, at one point boasting of drinking 67 pints of beer in one eleven hour marathon drinking session.

Songs that the band were able to at develop during sessions in Hamburg included "Mercy in You", "Judas", "One Caress", "Get Right with Me", "Rush", and "My Joy". According to Lyon, some of the tracks were mixed in Hamburg, but likely were early mixes that were never released.

=== London sessions ===
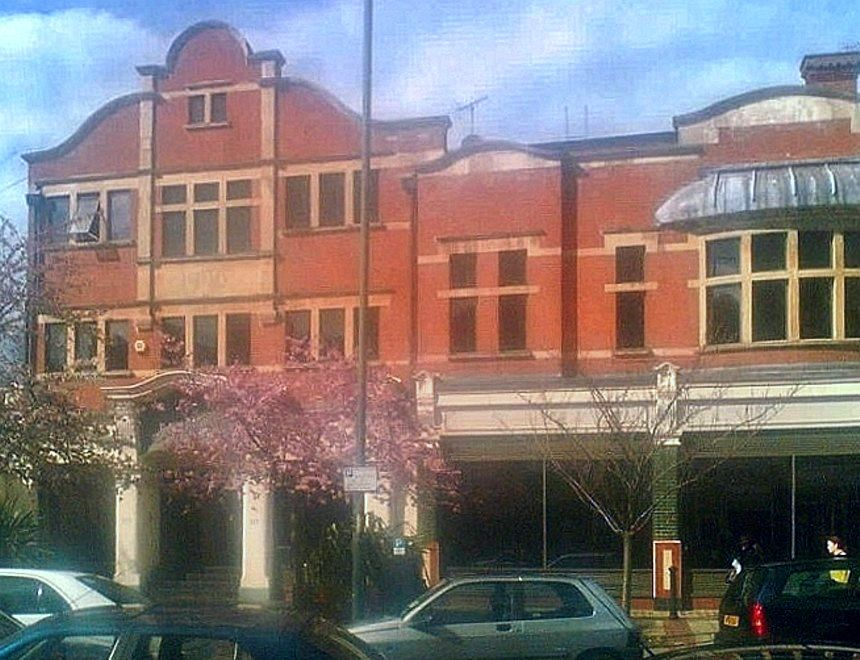
Olympic Studios, pictured in 2008, was the final recording and mixing location for the album.

The band moved to London to continue recording and mixing at Olympic Studios in late 1992. The final version of "One Caress" as well as vocals for "Rush" and "Get Right with Me" were completed at these sessions. Wilder also spent time while at Olympic Studios mixing "Walking in My Shoes" for its single release later in 1993. Wilder, Flood and Mark "Spike" Stent completed the final album mix at Olympic Studios in December 1992.

Though Wilder would say the band members had drifted as far apart as they had ever been, the emotional stress contributed to some of Depeche Mode's best tracks, including "In Your Room" and "Walking in My Shoes", which many felt were indicative of Gore's greatest works.

It was during the recording of the album that Wilder realised that he might have to leave the band. Wilder later was comparing the friction between the members of the Beatles during the recording of their 1968 self-titled album to conditions working on Songs of Faith and Devotion: "We were in the worst possible state as members but we were creating some of our best work. The stories I hear about them [The Beatles] not being even in the same room together – that was very much the same with us, when one person would be in the studio and the other would be in another city, and then the next day that person would come and do their vocal and you'd go away, because you couldn't bear to be in the same room. ... at the time, it was a living hell. During the making of that album, I really made a decision to leave the group; even though I didn't leave until two or three years later, I remember thinking 'I'm never going to make another record under these circumstances again, because it's so much not fun'. And music should be fun – there should be some sort of enjoyment there." When asked by the Depeche Mode fan club magazine Bong in early 1992 about whether or not he saw himself still with the band in ten years, he said no.

=== Equipment ===
To record the album, the band used the "latest model" of Akai stereo samplers as well as a S1100 sampler alongside a Mini Moog, ARP 2600, Oberheim Electronics synthesisers, and the Roland 700. They tried to avoid using more modern equipment like the Yamaha DX7, preferring the sound of older models for the album.

The band avoided using any drum machines, instead preferring to sample live drums and loop them back for the songs. Gore and Gahan disagree on whose idea it was to have Wilder play drums live, both claim it was their idea and that the other approved. Additionally, Wilder said that for the album, the band switched to running Steinberg Cubase on a computer, which allowed them to assemble some of the tracks digitally.

Guitar parts were typically processed through devices such as Leslie tone cabinets, originally designed for organs, to achieve different sounds. The album marked the first time the band hired outside musicians to play on their songs.

== Songs ==
Collectively, the album was viewed to convey themes of religion, sin, redemption, betrayal, forgiveness, sex, love and fidelity. Gahan said in a contemporary interview, "It's either religion or sex with Martin [Gore], pretty much, or somewhere in between the two. But they're pretty close anyway, let's face it." Gore said "I've always been fascinated by religion. ... I just haven't tried to make the music be so obviously religious before."

=== Side one ===
"I Feel You", which Gahan described as having a "classic, bluesy, rock 'n roll sort of riff" was augmented with live, sampled drums played by Wilder in the studio in Madrid: "I went in and played drums along with the track in one particular style, then did it again in a funkier style, and so on ... There's a series of loops, which are sequenced together ... in a different structure from how they were originally performed. At the beginning of 'I Feel You' the drum kit is played, sampled, put through a synth, distorted, and then reduced to half-level." Although Wilder had to convince the rest of the band to sequence "I Feel You" as the lead song on the album, everyone agreed it should be the album's first single. Wilder said "the track had attitude and was radically different to what we had done before. We hoped it would surprise people and make them curious about the rest of the album."

"Walking in My Shoes" had similar beginnings, with the band jamming together. Said Wilder, "Martin [Gore] played the guitar, I played bass and we ran a rhythm machine – this was just to get the basic feel of the track, and after much trial and error, the chorus bass line and guitar pattern fell into place." The track included a piano part which was processed through a guitar processor to add distortion. Wilder said that the track "is probably the best example of the new multi-layered DM sound. The more organic feel was created with the use of live bass and guitar, plus a dynamic string arrangement and a series of different drum loops, blended with both old and new Mode techniques. The e-bow guitar (playing the end melody) endowed the track with a haunting quality, which was also evident in Dave's voice mirroring the distorted piano and harpsichord riff." "Walking in My Shoes" was released in April 1993 as the second single from the album. Years later, Wilder and Gore called the song one of the best they'd ever made.

For the gospel-like "Condemnation", Wilder said that "the idea ... was to enhance the gospel feel that the song originally had ... and to try and create the effect of it being played in a room, a space." The early version of the song included all four band members performing in the same space — Fletcher bashing a flight case with a pole, producer Flood and Gahan clapping, Wilder playing a drum and Gore playing an organ. The sound gave the band a direction as to how the track should sound. For the final recording, Gahan delivered what he thought was the finest vocal performance of his career, despite his struggles with addiction. Said Gahan, "It was done under the studio in Madrid, a low-ceilinged place – very concrete and metal, and echoey and cold, and it had a great sound and a great ambience. When I came out, everybody in the control room went all quiet and turned around, and suddenly Flood said, 'That was fucking great!' And Alan [Wilder] and everybody said, 'That's probably the best vocal you ever did' – and I thought, 'Yeah, it was.' It was completely breaking me up inside, and, at the same time, it was really optimistic and uplifting." "Condemnation" was released as the third single from the album in September 1993.

"Mercy in You" included the piano reversed on the outro.

"Judas" was recorded a few different ways, which bothered Gore, who sang on the track. Said Wilder, "Martin [Gore] didn't say much about it, which is his way of indicating he doesn't like something." The introduction of the track has uilleann pipes performed by Steafan Hannigan, recorded with reversed reverberation mixed into the sound to achieve a haunting, atmospheric feel. Flood later recalled Gore and Wilder in a heated argument over how the track was mixed.

=== Side two ===
"In Your Room", described by Wilder as one of his top two favorite Depeche Mode tracks ever, was called "the most sensual piece they've ever recorded" in a review in 1993. According to Wilder, the song's production was "difficult", saying "we recorded it three or four different ways. One was entirely as you heard it on the second verse, with smaller drum kits and the 'groovy' bassline. But the whole song with that rhythm wasn't strong enough, it didn't go anywhere. We had the song structure from a fairly early stage. We knew where we wanted the verses, choruses and middle eights. So much as I did with 'I Feel You', I went in and played drums along with the track in one particular style, then did it again in a funkier style, and so on." A remixed version of "In Your Room" by Butch Vig was released as the album's fourth and final single in January 1994.

For "Get Right with Me", which Gittins' biography called "haltingly euphoric," the band hired gospel singer Bazil Meade along with backup singers Hildia Campbell and Samantha Smith to perform on the track. Initially hesitant to have them sing on the song, Gore changed his mind once he heard them sing: "The moment that they started singing, it lifted the track on to another level." Campbell and Smith would join the band for the 1993–94 Devotional Tour.

"Rush" was described by one reviewer as "one of the rockiest tracks" on the album, with lyrics that show that the band "again find it hard to keep a passionate love song from sounding more like obsessive sickness."

For the track "One Caress", the band brought in a 28-piece string section and recorded them alongside Gore, who sang the vocals live with them, resulting in what Wilder called "the fastest ever recording of any one DM track, the other being 'Somebody'." The song was recorded in one day at Olympic Studios in London. The strings were arranged by Wil Malone, who had previously worked with Massive Attack. "One Caress" was considered as a single by US label Sire Records, and to that end a video for the song was shot for the song, but the single release was later cancelled. The video, shot by Kevin Kerslake, was the only video from the album not directed by frequent visual collaborator Anton Corbijn.

"My Joy" is a song recorded during the Hamburg sessions and initially slated for inclusion on the album until it was relegated to being the B-side to the single release of "Walking in My Shoes" because the band didn't think the song was strong enough to be an album track.

=== Single selection ===
Wilder remembered that the band had a hard time deciding which songs would be singles, and in which order they would be released, saying

"We would usually reach a consensus of opinion to form a shortlist of potential singles. For example, 'Higher Love' was on this for the 'Songs of Faith and Devotion', but never made it, and there were differences of opinion about in which order they should appear. Dave [Gahan], for example, felt very strongly that 'Condemnation' should have been the first single, but he was outvoted. I wanted 'Walking in My Shoes' as a second single and got my way, but I really wanted the original version of 'In Your Room'. This is all a good example of the problems with democracy – somebody usually ends up disappointed."

== Title and artwork ==
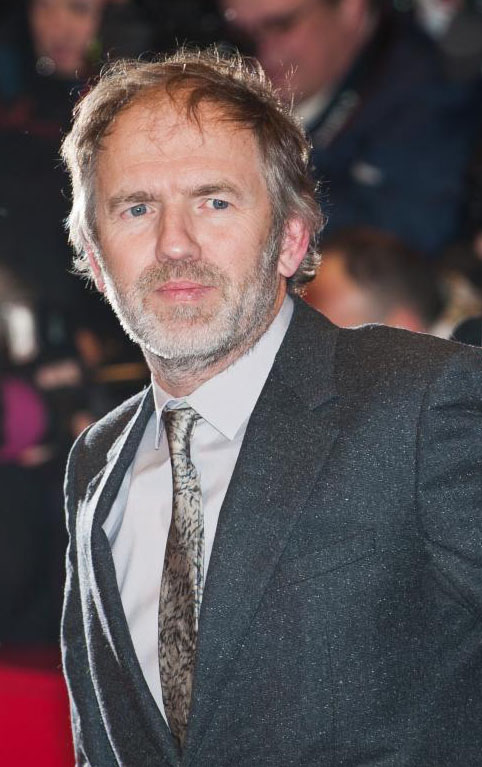
Anton Corbijn (pictured in 2012) was responsible for the album's cover and inside photos and artwork, as well as the covers for all the band's singles and most of the band's videos from Songs of Faith and Devotion. He also designed the stage and video projections for the supporting tour.

For the album title, according to Gore, "we wanted to get something with religious overtones but also a hint of ambiguity. 'Songs of Faith and Devotion' sounds very devout, but at the same time, faith in what? Devotion to what?"

Corbijn designed the album's cover image and took the photos for the album sleeve. The cover photo was their first studio album cover to feature the band's faces. Noting that Fletcher only appeared in a single photo on the album's inner sleeve, Wilder said that "Anton turned up for a few weeks here and there, and all the photos were natural; Fletch wasn't in them because he wasn't around at the time."

== Release and promotion ==
Starting in January 1993, the band started a press tour to promote their new album, visiting TV and radio stations in Denmark, Holland, Belgium, France, Germany, Italy and Spain. Also in January, some radio stations in the US received illicit advanced copies of the album and played some of the tracks on air; a fan posted a copy of the album on the Internet service Prodigy, prompting a legal takedown. It was one of the first internet leaks, at a time when they posed merely a "conceptual thread to the record industry", according to Eric Harvey of Pitchfork, who noted that the songs existed as "MPEG Layer-2" files that would have each taken a lengthy time to download, adding "it probably felt like nothing short of magic [to fans] that they could get [the new Depeche Mode album] through an AOL connection."

On 16 January 1993, Fletcher married his long time girlfriend in London; Gore was his best man and guests included Wilder, Vince Clarke and Alison Moyet.

The first week of March, the band did a press tour in New York, Toronto and Los Angeles, and appeared on the call-in radio show Modern Rock Live. On 12 March, the band threw a "Global Release Party" in London at the Ministry of Sound, with other clubs in Europe receiving a satellite feed of the London event. In an interview with Pulse! magazine, Gore suggested that the band were considering appearing on MTV Unplugged, although this did not come to fruition.

Songs of Faith and Devotion was released on 22 March 1993 by Mute Records in the UK with catalogue number STUMM106. The label released a variety of promotional items to coincide with the album's release, including branded candles and incense burners. The album was initially successful, opening at number one in seventeen countries, and was one of the few albums at the time to open at number one in both the US and UK, a feat previously only accomplished by bands like The Beatles, Pink Floyd and Elton John. As of 2003, the album had sold over 5,000,000 copies.

The album was remastered and released in October 2006 in a "Collector's Edition" that included the original album in stereo and 5.1 surround sound, B-sides and a documentary about the making of the album.

=== Tour ===
Work for the supporting began by Christmas 1992 when Wilder and Lyon started to assemble the backing tracks to be used on tour. Corbijn was tasked with designing the tour's stage and visuals. The first leg of the tour, known as the Devotional Tour, ran from May to December 1993. Three of the concerts near the end of the first European leg in July 1993 were recorded for the video release Devotional, released in November 1993. Tracks from the first European leg of the tour were also recorded for a live album; during the month-long break between the European and US legs in August 1993, Wilder and Lyon went to Dublin to mix the live album at Windmill Lane Studios. Songs of Faith and Devotion Live, released in December 1993, was sequenced identically to Songs of Faith and Devotion, which Wilder suggested was a "cynical attempt to prolong sales of the studio album of the same name. Having the identical running order meant that it could be given the same catalogue number."

On 8 October 1993, at the end of the show playing in New Orleans, Gahan suffered a drug-induced heart attack. Collapsing just before the encore, Gahan was taken to the hospital while the band improvised with a live performance of "Death's Door". Told by doctors to end the tour to avoid heart complications, Gahan refused and the tour continued.

As the tour's production was expensive, the band decided to extend the tour for another leg for six months to help recoup costs, leading to the "1994 Exotic/Summer '94" leg from February through July 1994. The two collective legs of the tour were later called "The most debauched rock 'n roll tour ever" by Q magazine due to the excesses of sex and drugs by the band over the course of the entire tour. During the tour, relationships between the band members continued to fray, leading to Fletcher pulling out of the tour completely, Gore having two seizures, and both Gahan and Gore were arrested on separate occasions for assault and a noise complaint, respectively. By the end of both legs of the tour, the band had visited twenty-seven countries and played to over two million people and 156 shows.

== Subsequent events ==
In August 1994, one month after the end of the tour, Gore married Boisvert, with whom he had his daughter back in 1991.

During the tour, Wilder had begun a relationship with Hepzibah Sessa of the band Miranda Sex Garden, who had opened for the band on some dates during the tour. After the tour completed, Wilder left his wife Jeri Young, whom he had married in 1991, for Sessa. Wilder also was not sure if he would stay in the band, saying later that "I took some time out after the tour [in late 1994] to be absolutely sure that I was thinking clearly. And I told myself that if I felt the same in six months' time or as with the last album, then I should stop."

Gahan and his wife Conroy returned to London for a few months, during which time his heroin habit got even more "completely out of hand." Said Gahan later, "the bottom line is, I didn't want to get clean [at the time]." Around September, the couple moved back to Los Angeles and continued to party and use drugs. In LA, Gahan had reached a point where he withdrew to the point where he "had a closet under the stairs. That was plenty enough room. I was in there with my candle and my spoon, and that was it." On one of the rare occasions that Gahan did leave the house, he ran into Michael Stipe of R.E.M., who was so alarmed at Gahan's appearance that he called their mutual friend Corbijn to try and get him help. In late 1994 Gahan was caught by his mother with his drug paraphernalia out while he had his young son over for a visit. Confessing to his mother that he was an addict, he went into rehab around Christmas 1994, but continued to use drugs and went in and out of rehab through the first half of 1995. In early 1995, when he told Conroy that he was trying to get clean, she refused to stop using drugs, and left him. As a result, Gahan slid further into his addiction, saying "when Teresa [Conroy] left I was then given the excuse to go out and get even more fucked up. I was hell-bent on going the whole hog. My wife had left me, my friends were disappearing, so I was surrounded by a bunch of junkies. I knew exactly what was going on. I had money, I had drugs and that was why they were around me. It fueled my anger even more."

=== Wilder's departure ===
By early 1995, Wilder had come to a decision to leave the band. Citing frustration with the band, the process of creating the album, and unequal workload, Wilder reached out to Gore, Fletcher and Gahan to let them know his decision. He met with Gore and Fletcher in London to deliver the news in person. Of all the members, Wilder was closest to Gahan, but was unable to reach him due to Gahan's addiction. After trying to reach him over the phone, in the end he could only send a fax to Gahan saying roughly "Look, I've tried to call you, Dave. I can't get a hold of you. I've just had a meeting with the others to say I've left the group. Good luck." The official announcement to the press and fans was made on 1 June 1995, in a statement by Wilder that said,

"Due to increasing dissatisfaction with the internal relations and working practices of the group, it is with some sadness that I have decided to part company from Depeche Mode. ... I have continually striven to give total energy, enthusiasm and commitment to the furthering of the group's success and in spite of a consistent imbalance in the distribution of the workload ... this level of input never received the respect and acknowledgement that it warrants. ... Suffice to say that relations have become seriously strained, increasingly frustrating and, ultimately, in certain situations, intolerable. ... The remaining band members have my support and best wishes for anything they may pursue in the future."

Gore later said,

"We always spoke openly about the fact that Andy [Fletcher] wasn't particularly musical – during live shows, we gave him certain parts to play that weren't too taxing. (Note: In a Depeche Mode look-alike competition around 1993 hosted by KROQ-FM, the sole entrant as Fletcher won the contest when he "just stood there, then took a step to the side and did a big off–the–beat clap, and then stepped back. He may have also pretended to hit a keyboard with one finger.") Around this time, Alan had a very large share in what made Depeche Mode, both in its production and preparations. I think he thought it was wrong that he earned exactly the same as Andy, who did practically nothing in the studio."

Miller understood Wilder's decision, saying "I've always thought [Wilder] was underrated by the others. Or rather, Dave valued what he did. Fletch played down what he did and Martin was just off in his world and really didn't think about it. It wasn't just the musical element. Alan was the one who took the trouble to check things and listen to the cuts. He looked at the artwork, and so on. He took a lot of interest in all the aspects of [the band and its business]."

=== Gahan's suicide attempt ===
On 17 August 1995, Gahan checked out of another stint of rehab and returned to his Los Angeles home to find it ransacked. Gahan called it an "inside job", since the thieves had turned off his home alarm and even changed the code. Among the items stolen from his house were tapes of songs that Gahan had been trying to record. At this point, Gahan returned to one of his fellow drug users, "got loaded and drank a lot of wine, and took a handful of pills", called his mother, and then slit his wrists. His friend called 911 and paramedics were able to save Gahan, but the story made it to the press and Gahan was checked into Cedars-Sinai Medical Center for a few days. Gahan returned to using drugs shortly after his suicide attempt.

In October 1995, Fletcher and Gore persuaded Gahan to join them in London for a six-week recording session to try and record new material. Although Gahan was still using heroin and barely able to participate, this marked the beginning of the sessions for their next album, Ultra (1997).

== Reception ==
Professional ratings
Review scores
Source	Rating
AllMusic	4.5/5 stars
Chicago Sun-Times	3/4 stars
Chicago Tribune	2/4 stars
Entertainment Weekly	B
Mojo	4/5 stars
NME	8/10
Q	4/5 stars
Rolling Stone	3/5 stars
Select	4/5
Uncut	4/5 stars

Songs of Faith and Devotion became Depeche Mode's first studio album to reach number one on both the UK Albums Chart and the US Billboard 200. It also topped the charts in Austria, Belgium, France, Germany and Switzerland.

The album received largely positive reviews from critics. In The Guardian, Adam Sweeting lauded Depeche Mode's musical growth on what he deemed to be an "astonishingly powerful album" and "a masterpiece", remarking that it "kills any residual notions of them being a 'synth-pop' act stone dead." David Quantick praised it in NME as a "more obviously emotional and mature" work than the band's previous albums and concluded that "Depeche Mode are much too interesting to avoid now that they are grown up." Q's Andy Gill found that the album "constitutes a resolute continuation of the mature experimental pop principles of Violator, with a few candles carried as torches", while in Select, Andrew Harrison said that it eschews Violator's "digital cleanliness" and contains "the most viscous, poisonous sound textures Depeche Mode have yet created." Jon Pareles of The New York Times wrote that "the songs make desire more desperate, and more alluring, than ever."

Calling the record "gloomy, pretentious and winning", Rolling Stone reviewer Arion Berger felt that Depeche Mode's strengths continued to lie in "style" rather than "concept", and thus commented that "wisely ... the band forgoes new concepts and does its tinkering musically" instead. David Fricke in Melody Maker called it "a "transparent collision of U2's Achtung Baby and R.E.M.'s Automatic for the People – industrial pop crackle with a grim, obsessive confessional twist", similarly to Quantick who felt it "out-Achtung Baby's Achtung Baby" and casts Depeche Mode as "all-out moody Euro art stadium rock". Entertainment Weekly's Bill Wyman was less enthused, summarising the album as "thinking-teen's pop" for "tortured suburban youth" while finding that Depeche Mode "don't really have much to say" and that "their computer-based soundscapes are too limited". Music critic Robert Christgau graded it a "dud".

In a retrospective review for AllMusic, Ned Raggett wrote that apart from Alan Wilder and Flood's "new sonic tricks", Songs of Faith and Devotion "sounds pretty much like a Depeche Mode album", yet "works incredibly well all the same" and "continues the Depeche Mode winning streak"; he ranked it at number 18 on his list of "The Top 136 or So Albums of the Nineties" for Freaky Trigger. Uncut journalist Stephen Dalton called it a "widescreen experiment in soulful self-laceration" that "lifts the Mode to a higher musical level and defies the traumatic circumstances surrounding its conception." Similarly, Danny Eccleston stated in Mojo that the album "should have been rotten" given its fraught creation, "but DM's momentum kept rolling." Songs of Faith and Devotion was included in Q's 1995 list "In Our Lifetime: Q's 100 Best Albums", along with Violator.

Wilder stated he felt "In Your Room" and "Walking in My Shoes" to be some of the best works the band had ever done, a sentiment agreed upon by Flood, who commented that "many people" involved in the project shared such sentiments. Fellow musician Gary Numan also stated that Songs of Faith and Devotion was the album that saved his career, noting, "[after listening to this album] [my] music changed dramatically. It became much darker. At school I was excused from religious instruction because I had no faith and Songs of Faith and Devotion suddenly gave me something to write about and something to be bothered about. [...] I love Depeche Mode, always will." In 2001, Gahan called the album "one of my favourite albums of ours."

== Track listing ==
All tracks are written by Martin L. Gore. All lead vocals by Dave Gahan, except where noted.

Side one
No.	Title	Lead vocals	Length
1.	"I Feel You"		4:35
2.	"Walking in My Shoes"		5:35
3.	"Condemnation"		3:20
4.	"Mercy in You"		4:17
5.	"Judas"	Gore	5:14

Side two
No.	Title	Lead vocals	Length
6.	"In Your Room"		6:26
7.	"Get Right with Me" (includes hidden track "Interlude #4" at 2:59)		3:52
8.	"Rush"		4:37
9.	"One Caress"	Gore	3:32
10.	"Higher Love"		5:56
Total length:			47:26

=== 2006 Collectors Edition CD + DVD ===
Disc one (CD)
No.	Title	Length
1.	"I Feel You"	4:35
2.	"Walking in My Shoes"	5:35
3.	"Condemnation"	3:20
4.	"Mercy in You"	4:17
5.	"Judas"	5:14
6.	"In Your Room"	6:26
7.	"Get Right with Me" (includes hidden track "Interlude #4" at 2:59)	3:52
8.	"Rush"	4:37
9.	"One Caress"	3:32
10.	"Higher Love"	5:56

Disc two (DVD): DTS 5.1, Dolby Digital 5.1 and PCM Stereo
No.	Title	Length
1.	"Depeche Mode: 1991–94 (We Were Going to Live Together, Record Together and It Was Going to Be Wonderful)" (a short film)	36:00
2.	"I Feel You"	4:35
3.	"Walking in My Shoes"	5:35
4.	"Condemnation"	3:20
5.	"Mercy in You"	4:17
6.	"Judas"	5:14
7.	"In Your Room"	6:26
8.	"Get Right with Me" (includes hidden track "Interlude #4" at 2:59)	3:52
9.	"Rush"	4:37
10.	"One Caress"	3:32
11.	"Higher Love"	5:56

Disc two (DVD) additional tracks: PCM Stereo
No.	Title	Lead vocals	Length
12.	"My Joy"		3:57
13.	"Condemnation" (Paris mix)		3:21
14.	"Death's Door" (Jazz mix)	Gore	6:38
15.	"In Your Room" (Zephyr mix)		4:50
16.	"I Feel You" (Life's Too Short mix)		8:35
17.	"Walking in My Shoes" (Grungy Gonads mix)		6:24
18.	"My Joy" (Slow Slide mix)		5:11
19.	"In Your Room" (Apex mix)		6:43

== Personnel ==
Credits adapted from the liner notes of Songs of Faith and Devotion.

=== Depeche Mode ===
- Andrew Fletcher
- David Gahan
- Martin Gore
- Alan Wilder

=== Additional musicians ===
- Bazil Meade – additional vocals (track 7)
- Hildia Campbell – additional vocals (track 7)
- Samantha Smith – additional vocals (track 7)
- Steáfán Hannigan – uilleann pipes (track 5)
- Wil Malone – string arrangements, strings conducting (track 9)

=== Technical ===
- Depeche Mode – production, mixing
- Flood – production, mixing
- Mark Stent – mixing
- Steve Lyon – engineering
- Chris Dickie – engineering
- Paul Kendall – engineering
- Jeremy Wheatley – engineering assistance
- Marc Einstmann – engineering assistance
- Shaun de Feo – engineering assistance
- Volke Schneider – engineering assistance
- Kevin Metcalfe – mastering
- Daryl Bamonte – album coordination

=== Artwork ===
- Anton Corbijn – visuals, art direction, sleeve design
- Area – sleeve design

== Charts ==
=== Weekly charts ===
1993 weekly chart performance for Songs of Faith and Devotion
Chart (1993)	Peak position
Australian Albums (ARIA)	14
Austrian Albums (Ö3 Austria)	1
Belgian Albums (IFPI)	1
Canada Top Albums/CDs (RPM)	5
Danish Albums (Hitlisten)	4
Dutch Albums (Album Top 100)	18
European Albums (Music & Media)	1
Finnish Albums (Suomen virallinen lista)	1
French Albums (SNEP)	1
German Albums (Offizielle Top 100)	1
Greek Albums (IFPI)	1
Hungarian Albums (MAHASZ)	12
Irish Albums (IFPI)	4
Italian Albums (Musica e dischi)	6
Japanese Albums (Oricon)	31
New Zealand Albums (RMNZ)	31
Norwegian Albums (VG-lista)	16
Portuguese Albums (AFP)	6
Spanish Albums (AFYVE)	2
Swedish Albums (Sverigetopplistan)	2
Swiss Albums (Schweizer Hitparade)	1
UK Albums (Official Charts)	1
UK Independent Albums (OCC)	1
US Billboard 200	1

2017 weekly chart performance for Songs of Faith and Devotion
Chart (2017)	Peak position
Polish Albums (ZPAV)	27

=== Year-end charts ===
Year-end chart performance for Songs of Faith and Devotion
Chart (1993)	Position
Austrian Albums (Ö3 Austria)	21
Canada Top Albums/CDs (RPM)	34
European Albums (Music & Media)	14
German Albums (Offizielle Top 100)	19
Spanish Albums (AFYVE)	42
UK Albums (OCC)	56
US Billboard 200	89

== Certifications and sales ==
Certifications and sales for Songs of Faith and Devotion
Region	Certification	Certified units/sales
Austria (IFPI Austria)	Gold	25,000^{*}
Canada (Music Canada)	Platinum	100,000^{^}
France (SNEP)	2× Gold	200,000^{*}
Germany (BVMI)	Gold	250,000^{^}
Italy	—	150,000
Switzerland (IFPI Switzerland)	Gold	25,000^{^}
United Kingdom (BPI)	Gold	100,000^{^}
United States (RIAA)	Platinum	1,000,000^{^}
Summaries
Worldwide	—	4,000,000
^{*} Sales figures based on certification alone.^{^} Shipments figures based on certification alone.

== See also ==
- List of UK Albums Chart number ones of the 1990s
- List of European number-one hits of 1993
- List of number-one albums of 1993 (U.S.)
