= Robert Lambe =

British Anglican priest and writer

Robert Lambe (1711–1795) was an English Anglican priest and writer.

== Life ==
Lambe was born in Durham, the son of John Lambe, a mercer. After attending Durham School, he was admitted a sizar of St John's College, Cambridge in April 1728, and graduated B. A. in 1734. Taking holy orders, he was successively a minor canon of Durham Cathedral, perpetual curate of South Shields, and from 1747 vicar of Norham in Northumberland, where he remained for the rest of his life.

He was of eccentric disposition; James Raine gave the following account of his courtship. Suddenly determining to marry Philadelphia Nelson, the daughter of a Durham carrier, whom he had seen only once, and that many years before, he sent a proposal to her by letter, inviting her to meet him on Berwick pier, and bidding her carry a tea-caddy under her arm for purposes of identification. On the appointed day, owing to his habitual absent-mindedness, he failed to meet her, but the marriage took place on 11 April 1755.

He died in Edinburgh in 1795, and was buried in Eyemouth churchyard. His wife had died in 1772. A daughter, Philadelphia, married Alexander Robertson of Prenderguest in Berwickshire; two sons died young.

== Works ==
Lambe wrote The History of Chess (1764; another edition, 1765). His chief work, however, was An Exact and Circumstantial History of the Battle of Flodden, in verse, written about the time of Queen Elizabeth (1774, 1809). This is said to be published from a manuscript in the possession of John Askew of Pallingsburn, Northumberland; the notes, especially those on etymology, are numerous and very curious. Lambe was also the author of the ballad "The Laidly Worm of Spindleston Heugh", which William Hutchinson thought ancient, and inserted in his history of Northumberland. Thomas Percy, in the preface to his Reliques of Ancient English Poetry, mentions Lambe as one who had been of service to him.
