= Garden of Love =

(The) Garden of Love may refer to:

== Literature and art ==
- "The Garden of Love" (poem), a poem by William Blake
- The Garden of Love (Rubens), a painting by Rubens

== Film and TV ==
- Garden of Love (film), a 2003 German horror film
- Las Vegas Garden of Love, a 2005 reality television series

== Music ==
=== Albums ===
- Garden of Love (album), a 1980 album by Rick James
- Garden of Love, an album by Raymond Donnez
- Garden of Love, a 1997 album by Roxanne Beck
- The Garden of Love, a 1997 album by Kevin Ayers
- The Garden of Love, a 1999 album by Frankie Armstrong

=== Songs ===
- "Garden of Love" (song), a 2014 song by Kim-Lian
- "Garden of Love", a song by Thelma Aoyama with Makai
- "Ai no Sono (Touch My Heart!)" (English:"Garden of Love: Touch My Heart!"), a song by Morning Musume Otomegumi
- "Garden of Love", a 1961 song by The Safaris
- "Garden of Love", a 1963 song by Gene Pitney
- "My Garden of Love", a pun-laden parody of torch songs by Benny Hill
