= Hudson Records =

British independent folk music label

- Founded: 2016
- Founder: Andy Bell, Neil McSweeney
- Country of origin: United Kingdom
- Location: Sheffield
- Official website: hudsonrecords.co.uk

Hudson Records is a British independent record label specialising in folk and acoustic music. Founded in 2016 by producer and engineer Andy Bell and musician Neil McSweeney, it has released records by Karine Polwart, Jon Boden, Sam Sweeney, The Furrow Collective, Bellowhead, The Young'uns and others. It was named for Bell's dog, Hudson.

The Hudson Club is a monthly subscription scheme offering access to all Hudson Records releases, as well as other exclusive features.
