= Not to Scale =

Studio album by Kerfuffle
- Released: 14 June 2003
- Recorded: March 2003 at Oisín Studios
- Genre: Folk
- Length: 45:11
- Label: RootBeat Records
- Producer: Steáfán Hannigan

Kerfuffle chronology
Not to Scale (2003)	K2 (2004)

Professional ratings
Review scores
Source	Rating
The Living Tradition	not rated
NetRhythms	not rated

Not to Scale is the first album by folk band Kerfuffle.

== Track listing ==
No.	Title	Writer(s)	Length
1.	"Catharsis/Peterman/Siobhan O’Donnell’s"	Amy Cann/Kathryn Tickell/Trad.	4:20
2.	"Ahma/ Ruchenitsa/Farewell to Chernobyl"	Maria Kalaniemi/Trad./Michael Ferry	7:31
3.	"If I Was a Blackbird"	Trad.	5:25
4.	"Quendale Bay"	Phil Cunningham	4:03
5.	"Mick’s Knitted Triplets/The Ash Plant/The Bonny Isle of Whalsay"	Jennifer Wrigley/Trad./Trad.	2:59
6.	"Locharber Drive/Breton Tune/Poker Signature"	Aidan O'Rourke/Trad./Aidan O'Rourke	5:27
7.	"Brisk Young Widow/Gravel Walk/Victor’s Return"	Trad./Trad./Trad.	3:57
8.	"Lucy’s Sox/Morrisons"	Hannah James/Trad.	3:12
9.	"Falmouth Packet"	Phil Beer	1:44
10.	"Irish Toast/Emma & Jamie's Wedding"	Trad./McCusker	6:31

(All tracks arranged by Kerfuffle)

== Personnel ==
- Sam Sweeney (fiddle, percussion)
- Hannah James (Accordion, piano, vocals, clogging)
- Chris Thornton-Smith (Guitar)
- Tom Sweeney (Bass guitar)
