= The Demon Barbers =

English folk band

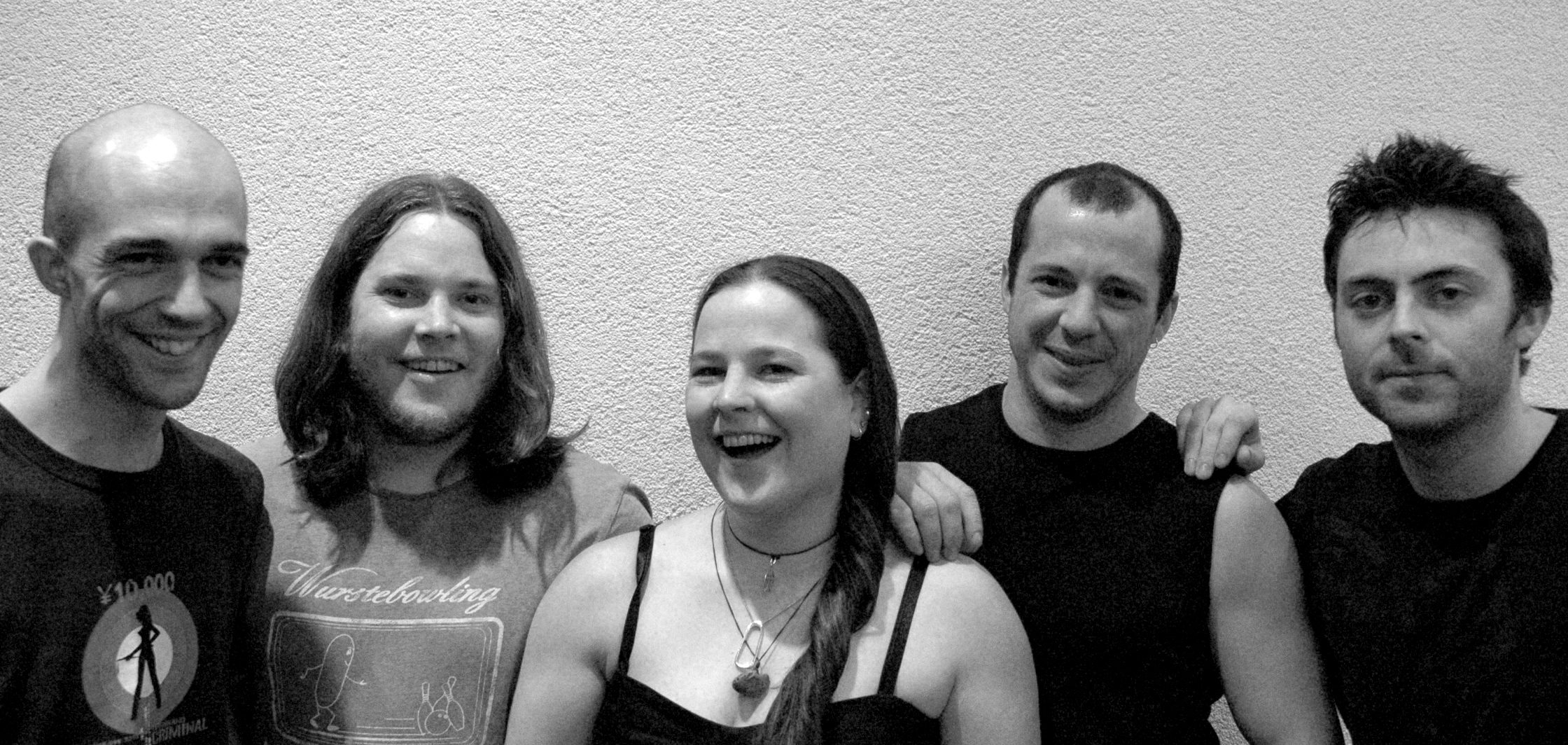
The Demon Barbers 2012

The Demon Barbers are an English folk band who predominantly draw on traditional material for their repertoire while fusing traditional folk instruments with drums and electric bass guitar. The band is particularly well known for its energetic live performances, winning "Best Live Act" at the BBC Radio 2 Folk Awards 2009 and being nominated for the same award in 2011.

== Band members ==
- Damien Barber – lead vocals, guitar, English concertina, C#/D button accordion
- Ben Griffith – drums, Vocals
- Cohen Braithwaite-Kilcoyne - Anglo Concertina, Melodeon, Vocals
- Hugh Vincent - Bass
- Alix Shepherd - Keys

Past members

- Bryony Griffith – lead vocals, fiddle
- Will Hampson – melodeon, harmonica
- Angus Milne – bass guitar
- Lee Sykes – bass guitar
- Max Ross – bass guitar

== Discography ==
=== Albums ===
- Uncut (2002)
- Waxed (2005)
- The Adventures of Captain Ward (2010)
- Disco at the Tavern (2015)

=== Mini-albums ===
- +24db (2008)
