= Sam Carter (musician) =

British singer songwriter

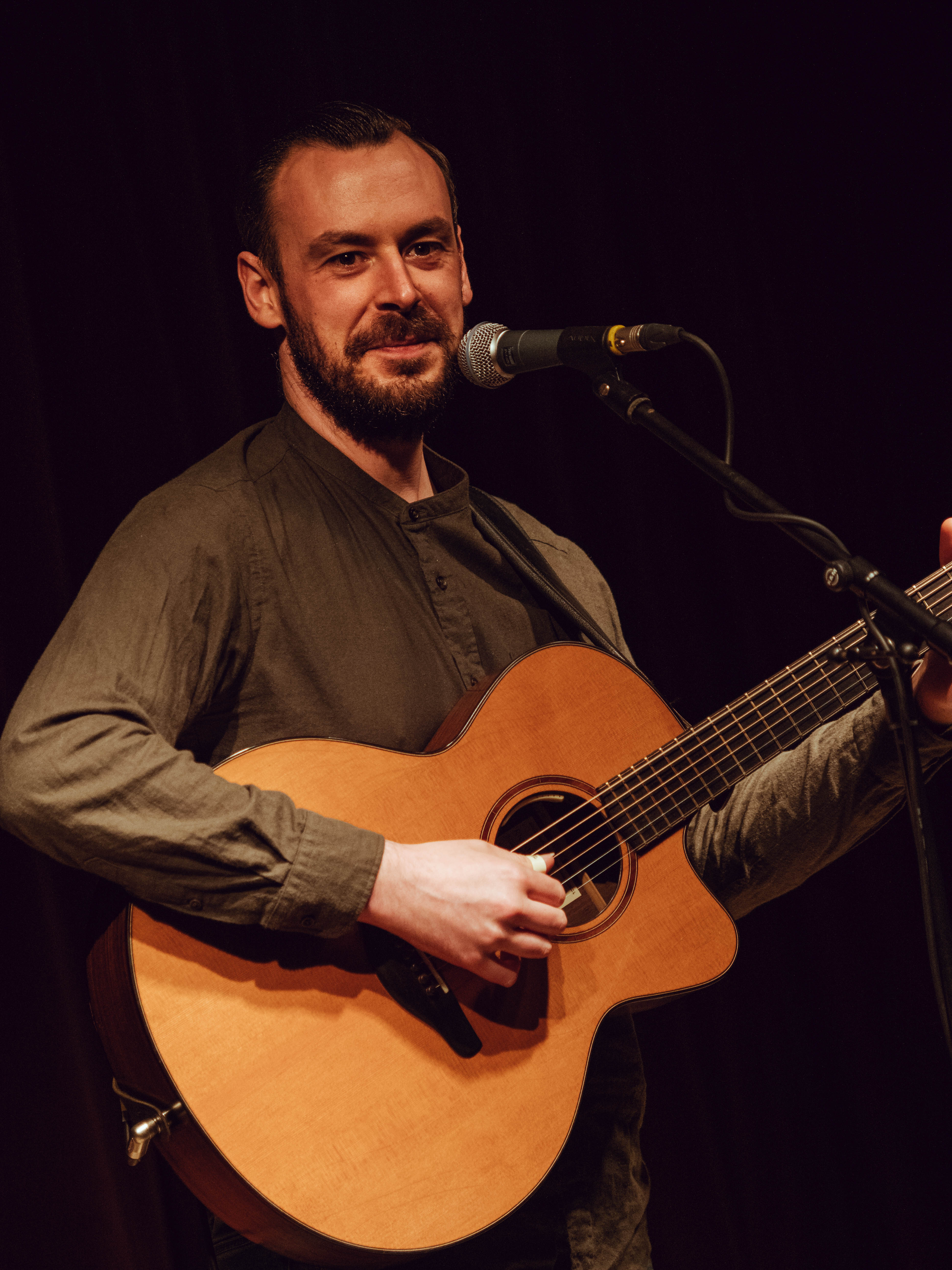

Background information
- Genres: Folk, roots
- Occupations: Musician, singer songwriter, guitarist
- Instrument: Guitar
- Years active: 2008 – present
- Website: samcartermusic.co.uk

Sam Carter is a British guitarist, singer and songwriter, originally from the English Midlands but more recently based in Sheffield. He has released four albums of mainly original material which fall loosely into the folk/roots category. Carter is the winner of the "Horizon" award for best newcomer at the BBC Radio 2 Folk Awards in 2010. Highly regarded as an instrumentalist, contemporary Jon Boden of Bellowhead described him as 'the finest English-style finger-picking guitarist of his generation, and former BBC Radio 2 folk show presenter Mike Harding wrote that Carter was "one of the most gifted acoustic guitarists of his generation". As a songwriter, Carter marries a traditionally English narrative style with elements of American gospel, shapenote, R&B and folk-rock has been described as an "impressively original" performer. Some commentators consider that Carter's guitar and vocal style is similar to that of noted British iconoclasts John Martyn and Roy Harper, whilst his lyrical perspective has further invited comparison with the work of Richard Thompson.

== Solo career ==
After moving to London from his native Rutland, Carter came to the attention of British Indian musician Nitin Sawhney and singer/songwriter Martin Simpson, from whom he reportedly received some guitar tuition. As a result of this, he was installed as one of sixteen "Emerging Artists in Residence" at London's Southbank Centre in the autumn of 2008. This in turn led to an invitation from fellow Artists in Residence Bellowhead to tour the UK with them in the Spring of 2009, and to further collaborate with members of the group, both live and on record, particularly fiddle player Sam Sweeney. Carter released his debut album Keepsakes in August 2009 to generally positive reviews. Following his success at the BBC Radio 2 Folk Awards in February 2010, he was invited to participate in the British Council's 'Shifting Sands' project, an ongoing creative project featuring musicians from the UK and the Arabian Peninsula, and made a showcase appearance at the 2010 Cambridge Folk Festival.

Carter released a second album, The No Testament, in August 2012, performed on Later... with Jools Holland and appeared in two BBC Four documentaries, one about the legendary folk singer Nic Jones, broadcast on 29 and 30 September 2013, and the other a recording of a tribute concert to the late singer/songwriter Sandy Denny, broadcast in November 2012. After the release of his first album Carter became interested in American gospel and spiritual music, and the shapenote hymn-singing tradition of southern American vocal harmony music in particular, which influences were reflected in some of the songs on The No Testament. He appeared at the annual Shrewsbury Folk Festival in 2010 and 2013. For festival appearances during the summer of 2013, and subsequent live dates in the autumn of the same year, Carter formed a Trio with Matt Ridley (double bass) and Karl Penney (drums). Additionally, he played a handful of dates with Canadian folk singer Catherine MacLellan, with whom he had collaborated in 2012 on a transatlantic exchange visit organised and sponsored by the English Folk Dance & Song Society. His collaboration with Zimbabwean singer Lucky Moyo resulted in an appearance on the Andrew Marr Show on the BBC as part of 'Celebrating Sanctuary London 2013.'

In early 2014 the British Council invited Carter to perform in Pakistan as part of their 'Folk Nations' project. Carter performed twice in Karachi with acclaimed sitar player Sajid Hussain and tabla player Haroon Samuel, and conducted a songwriting workshop at the National Academy of Performing Arts. In March 2014 Carter returned to the UK to tour with his trio line-up, a number of the concerts also featuring Sam Sweeney, and toured solo in Canada in July, including a performance at Calgary Folk Festival. In late 2015 Carter collaborated with folk contemporaries Nancy Kerr, Maz O'Connor and Martyn Joseph for Sweet Liberties, an EFDSS and Folk By The Oak joint-funded songwriting project which toured major UK venues in Autumn 2015. The project spawned an album of the same name and featured on BBC Radio 3's World On 3 in late 2016. Carter released his third album How The City Sings in April 2016. A concept album influenced by his time spent living in London, the album was co-produced by Dominic Monks and jazz pianist Neil Cowley. After touring the album Carter relocated from London to Sheffield in September 2016.

In late 2019, Sam joined the ensemble for the touring folk theatre show ‘Rising Up: Peterloo 2019’, arranging and performing songs written by the Young’uns’ Sean Cooney alongside Lucy Farrell of the Furrow Collective and Jim Molyneux.

In May 2020 Carter released his fourth studio album Home Waters, the 17-date album launch spring tour cancelled due to the COVID-19 pandemic.

== False Lights ==
Towards the end of 2014 Carter partnered with fellow roots musician Jim Moray in a "folk rock" venture named False Lights. The band appeared live in session on the BBC Radio 2's Folk Show with Mark Radcliffe in December 2014 and announced a short tour in early 2015 in support of the release of their debut album Salvor, which received a nomination for Best Album at the 2016 BBC Radio 2 Folk Awards. The band played a set as the backing band for Richard Thompson at Shrewsbury Folk Festival in August 2015. False Lights released follow-up album Harmonograph in February 2018, again appearing live in session on BBC Radio 2's Folk Show with Mark Radcliffe to promote the release.

== Discography ==
=== Solo ===
- Here in the Ground EP (Captain Records, 28 April 2008)
- Keepsakes (Captain Records, 10 August 2009)
- The No Testament (Captain Records, 20 August 2012)
- Live At The Union Chapel EP (Privately released, 10 December 2012 – previously available only from the artist at gigs)
- How the City Sings (Captain Records, 8 April 2016)
- Home Waters (Captain Records, 1 May 2020)
- Home Waters Live (Captain Records, 24 September 2021)
- Silver Horizon (Captain Records, 16 August 2024)

=== False Lights ===
- Salvor (Wreckord Label, 2 February 2015)
- Harmonograph (Wreckord Label, 2 February 2018)

=== Sweet Liberties ===
- Sweet Liberties (Quercus Records, 7 October 2016)
