= Sam Sweeney =

English folk musician (born 1989)

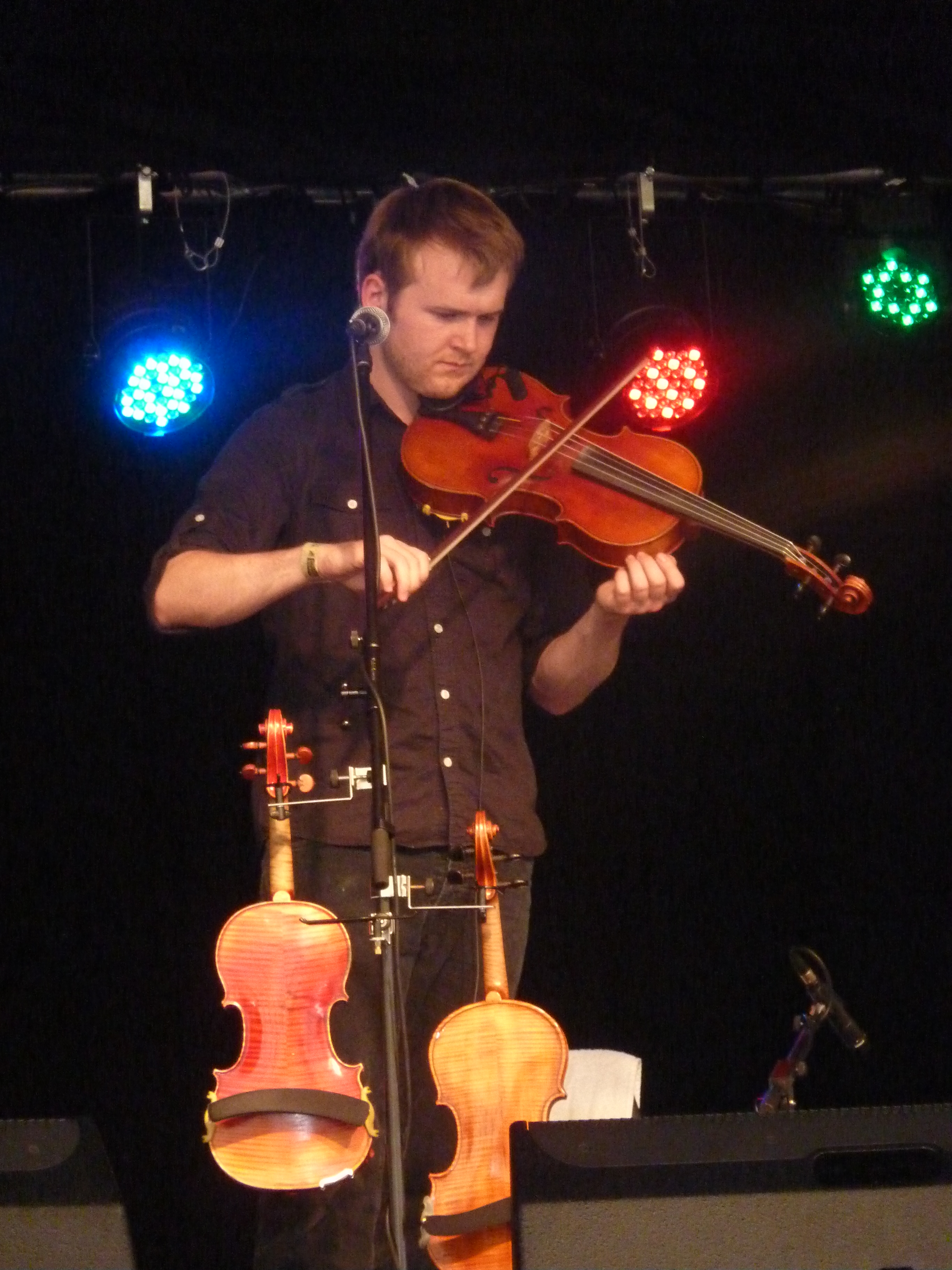
- Sweeney performing at the Warwick Folk Festival, July 2011

Background information
- Born: Sam Sweeney; 27 February 1989 (age 37); Nottingham, England
- Genres: Folk
- Occupation: Musician
- Years active: 2001–present
- Website: www.samsweeneymusic.com

Sam Sweeney (born 27 February 1989 in Nottingham) is a multi-instrumental English folk musician.

== Career ==
Sweeney was introduced to folk music as a child via his parents' record collection and taught himself to play traditional pieces by ear. He started playing the fiddle at age six, and first performed as a soloist at folk festivals in 2001. From 2002 to 2010, he was part of the East Midlands-based folk band Kerfuffle, playing fiddle, viola, and cajon, and singing. When Kerfuffle disbanded, Sweeney continued playing with accordion player and singer Hannah James as the duo Hannah James and Sam Sweeney.

From 2008 to 2016, he became a member of the award-winning eleven-piece folk band Bellowhead, playing fiddle and English bagpipes, as a replacement for former member Giles Lewin. Sweeney played with Bellowhead until their final gig in May 2016 at Oxford Town Hall.

He has toured with Jon Boden and the Remnant Kings, playing both drums and fiddle, sometimes simultaneously. He is also a member of Fay Hield's band, originally named the Fay Hield Trio but as of 2012 called Fay Hield & The Hurricane Party, and took part in The Full English album and tour in 2013.

Together with Andy Cutting and Rob Harbron, he formed English folk supergroup Leveret in 2015.

Sweeney helped set up the UK's National Youth Folk Ensemble, an EFDSS programme that introduces young people to folk music through schools, community settings and residential courses. He was appointed inaugural Artistic Director of the Ensemble in 2015.

In 2018, he started his solo career with the album The Unfinished Violin. Two years later in 2020, he followed it with his second album Unearth Repeat. Then, he released an album called Escape That in 2022. That album was used as support to Bellowhead reuniting for a November 2022 tour for the tenth anniversary of the band's album Broadside. He also played alongside his Bellowhead bandmates during the tour. The band decided to reunite after doing a virtual concert during the COVID-19 pandemic.

== Awards ==
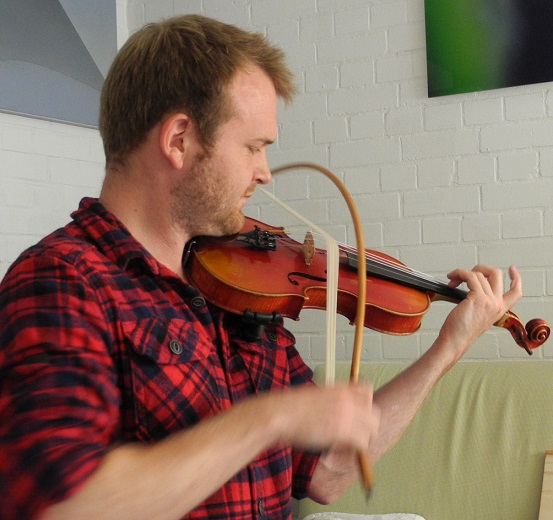
Sweeney with curved bow

Sweeney has won a number of awards including the "In The Tradition" award and the "Wiltshire Folk Association Young Folk Award", which he won for two years in succession. He was also a nominated in the 2004 BBC Young Folk Awards. In 2007, he won one of five BBC Performing Arts Fund bursaries to help him start his musical career. Sweeney was nominated for the "Musician of the Year" award at the 2013 BBC Radio 2 Folk Awards and won this award at the 2015 BBC Radio 2 Folk Awards. His album Unearth Repeat was voted "Album of the Year" for 2020 by Bright Young Folk readers with almost the 36 per cent of the votes.

== Discography ==
Year	Title	Band (or ensemble)	Ref
2003	Not to Scale	Kerfuffle	
2004	K2	Kerfuffle	
2005	Sleeping at the Station	(with Charlie Barker)	
2006	Links	Kerfuffle	
2008	To the Ground	Kerfuffle	
2008	Matachin	Bellowhead	
2009	Umbrellowhead	Bellowhead	
2009	Lighten the Dark: A Midwinter Album	Kerfuffle	
2009	Catches and Glees	Hannah James and Sam Sweeney	
2009	Keepsakes	(with Sam Carter)	
2010	Hedonism	Bellowhead	
2010	Looking Glass	(with Fay Hield)	
2010	No Man's Fool	(with Rachael McShane)	
2010	Born to Wander	(with Louise Jordan)	
2010	A New Dawn	Circus Envy	
2011	Regret	Circus Envy	
2012	The No Testament	(with Sam Carter)	
2012	State and Ancientry	Hannah James and Sam Sweeney	
2012	Broadside	Bellowhead	
2012	Orfeo	(with Fay Hield)	
2014	Revival	Bellowhead	
2014	Made in the Great War	Solo	
2015	New Anything	Leveret	
2016	Old Adam	(with Fay Hield)	
2016	How the City Sings	(with Sam Carter)	
2016	In the Round	Leveret	
2017	Big Machine	(with Eliza Carthy and the Wayward Band)	
2017	Inventions	Leveret	
2018	The Unfinished Violin	Solo	
2019	Diversions	Leveret	
2020	Variations Live	Leveret	
2020	Unearth Repeat	Solo	
2022	Escape That	Solo	
