= Kerfuffle =

Four-piece English folk band (2001–2010)

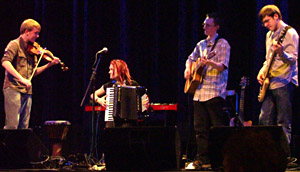
- From left to right: Sam, Hannah, Chris, Tom

Background information
- Origin: East Midlands/South Yorkshire, England
- Genres: Folk
- Years active: 2001–2010
- Label: RootBeat Records
- Members: Hannah James; Sam Sweeney; Jamie Roberts
- Past members: Chris Thornton-Smith; Tom Sweeney

Kerfuffle were a four-piece English folk band, originally formed in 2001 around the East Midlands and South Yorkshire regions of the UK, initially comprising Hannah James (accordion, piano, vocals, step dancing), Sam Sweeney (fiddle, percussion), Chris Thornton-Smith (guitar) and Tom Sweeney (bass guitar). Thornton-Smith was replaced by Jamie Roberts in 2007. Kerfuffle disbanded in August 2010.

== History ==
Kerfuffle formed initially as a three-piece after Sam and Tom Sweeney met Hannah James. James was competing in a traditional music competition, the In The Tradition Award, held at the Derby Assembly Rooms. Sam had previously won this, and was attending the 2001 competition in this capacity. After playing together in the foyer, the trio decided to form a band. After going on to win the under-18 category of the 2002 Wiltshire Folk Association Young Folk Award, another competition that Sam had previously won as a soloist, the band sought a fourth member and Hannah introduced the band to guitarist Chris Thornton-Smith. Having won the WFA competition, the band was given a showcase performance at the 2002 Trowbridge Village Pump Festival.

After a number of appearances at folk clubs, Kerfuffle recorded their first album in the spring of 2003. Produced by multi-instrumentalist Steafan Hannigan and recorded at his Oisín Studios, Not to Scale was released on the newly founded RootBeat Records on 14 June 2003, to coincide with the band's appearance at the first Festival of the Peak, a festival held at Carsington Water in Derbyshire. In the summer of 2003, Kerfuffle appeared at a number of other UK folk/traditional festivals, including Sidmouth Festival and a return to Trowbridge Village Pump Festival.

For 2004's K2, the band decided to utilise the sound engineering skills of guitarist Chris Thornton-Smith, and the album was recorded by Chris. The album was released in time for the band's summer festival appearances, which included Cleckheaton Festival, Priddy Folk Fayre, Stainsby Festival, Saltburn Festival, Whitby Folk Week, Towersey Festival, Bromyard Festival and a slot at the Show of Hands summer concert in the Abbotsbury Subtropical Gardens. In December 2004, the band were finalists in the 2005 BBC Radio 2 Young Folk Award.

Summer 2005 saw the band appear at Cleethorpes Folk Festival, Middlewich Folk & Boat Festival, Priddy Folk Festival, and Saddleworth Folk Festival. Also in 2005, the band's performances began to diversify into venues such as theatres and arts centres, as well as folk clubs, most notably including a performance as the post-show entertainment at the Linbury Theatre, a studio theatre attached to the Royal Opera House, Covent Garden. The same year, Kerfuffle recorded a live session for BBC Radio 3's Late Junction.

In early 2006, the band released Links. Appearances that summer at Bromyard Folk Festival, Brampton Live, Festival at the Edge and other events followed. A track from Links was included on the compilation Folk Rising released in July 2007.

In late 2007, having had a successful summer including appearances at Fairport's Cropredy Convention, Derby Traditional Music and Arts Festival and Shrewsbury Folk Festival, the band announced they would start work on their fourth album, their first featuring new guitarist Jamie Roberts (of folk duo Gilmore & Roberts), who had replaced Chris Thornton-Smith earlier that year. The album, entitled To The Ground, was released in 2008.

2007 also saw Sweeney join 11-piece folk band Bellowhead, having already played some gigs as a deputy for Giles Lewin.

In April 2010, Kerfuffle announced that after nine years Kerfuffle, in the current line-up, would come to an end. That summer included "farewell" visits to festivals including Sidmouth and Priddy. Their final performance was at Shrewsbury Folk Festival in August 2010.

In December 2010, Sam Sweeney, James and Roberts toured performing material from Lighten The Dark: A Midwinter Album. Tom Sweeney was replaced by special guest Rob Harbron. They were supported by Hannah James' band Lady Maisery, and the set included clog dancing.

In winter 2012, Kerfuffle reformed for a short UK Christmas-focussed tour, including once again Lighten the Dark material, and several clog-dancing episodes by Hannah.

== Discography ==
- Not to Scale (2003)
- K2 (2004)
- Links (2006)
- To The Ground (2008)
- Lighten The Dark: A Midwinter Album (2009)
