= Fay Hield =

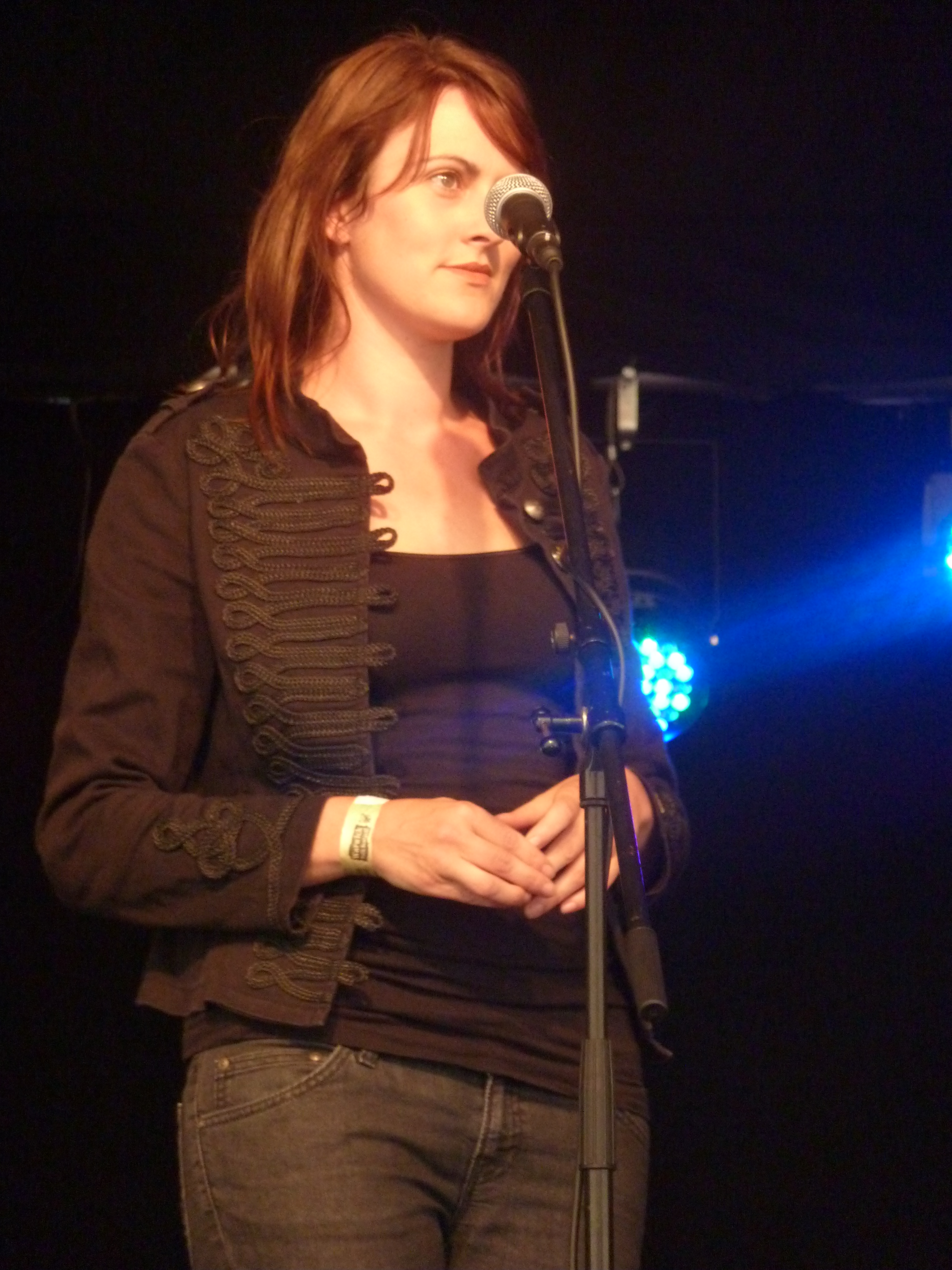
- Fay Hield at the Warwick Folk Festival, July 2011

Background information
- Born: 4 February 1978 (age 48)
- Genres: Folk
- Occupations: Folk singer; university Professor; ethnomusicologist
- Instrument: Vocals
- Years active: 1999–present
- Website: fayhield.com

Fay Hield (born 4 February 1978) is a traditional English folk singer and a Professor of Music at the University of Sheffield.

== Career ==
Looking Glass, released September 2010, was Hield's debut solo album. The material consists mainly of traditional songs and ballads. She started gigging her new album as the Fay Hield Trio, made up of Rob Harbron (English Acoustic Collective) and Sam Sweeney (Bellowhead). Hield was nominated for the Horizon Award at the 2010 BBC Radio 2 Folk Awards.

Hield was part of The Witches of Elswick, with whom she recorded two CDs in their six years together.

As researcher, Hield completed her PhD thesis "English Folk Singing and the Construction of Community" in 2010 at the University of Sheffield, then becoming a lecturer in ethnomusicology and music management in 2012 and Professor of Music in 2023. In 2021 she was awarded a Future Leaders Fellowship by UK Research and Innovation, to carry out a four-year research programme titled "Defining ethnomusicological Action Research through the regeneration of English folk clubs."

Along with her ex-partner Jon Boden, Hield helped to run two folk clubs – Royal Traditions (Dungworth) and Bright Phoebus (Sheffield). She also established a community music organisation in 2010, and ran the first Soundpost Singing Weekend in 2011.

Orfeo, released May 2012, was Hield's second album, with a new line-up, Fay Hield & the Hurricane Party (Jon Boden, Rob Harbron, Sam Sweeney & Andy Cutting).

In 2013 Hield in conjunction with the English Folk Dance and Song Society (EFDSS) put together The Full English band to promote the launch of the society's on-line publication of their archive search engine. The band issued an eponymous album and toured providing a showcase for both the band and the archive.

== The Full English ==
Folk singer and scholar Fay Hield was commissioned by the EFDSS to create new musical arrangements, drawing on the archive material, to accompany the project. She assembled a collective of musicians to perform at the launch party in June 2013, but after creating a set the musicians decided to extend the collaboration by producing an album and touring under The Full English name in order to promote the archive. The tour visited 11 English towns and cities in autumn 2013. Alongside Hield, other musicians involved included Seth Lakeman, Martin Simpson, Nancy Kerr, Sam Sweeney, Rob Harbron and Ben Nicholls.

On the tour, The Full English group performed folk songs from the archive and other traditional sources. They subsequently won two awards at the 2014 BBC Radio 2 Folk Awards for best group and best album.

== Discography ==
- Looking Glass (2010)
- Orfeo (May 2012)
- The Full English (2013)
- Old Adam (February 2016)
- Wrackline (September 2020)

=== With BACCApella ===
- The Haworth Set (1999)

=== With The Witches of Elswick ===
- Out of Bed (2003)
- Hell's Belles (2005)

== Personal life ==
Hield and her ex-partner, folk singer Jon Boden, have a daughter, born 2006, and a son, born 2009.
