= Selected (album) =

Compilation album by Recoil
- Released: 19 April 2010
- Recorded: 1991–2010
- Genre: Electronica; avant-garde
- Length: 76:51
- Label: Mute
- Producer: Alan Wilder

Recoil chronology
subHuman (2007)	Selected (2010)

Selected is the first compilation album released by the British musical project Recoil, fronted by Alan Wilder, released on April 19, 2010. The album features an eclectic mixture of vocalists including Diamanda Galás, Joe Richardson, Douglas McCarthy, Samantha Coerbell, Siobhan Lynch, Toni Halliday, Nicole Blackman, Maggie Estep and Carla Trevaskis.

The tracks on Selected were chosen by Wilder who explained that the collection was made up of "his personal favourites, remastered and edited together into what I consider a cohesive and total listening experience." The tracks have been edited, where appropriate, by Wilder and Paul Kendall and re-mastered with Simon Heyworth at the Super Audio Mastering.

The album is available as a single CD, double CD with new remixes and alternative versions, chosen and edited together by Wilder and Paul Kendall, a limited edition 4-vinyl box, plus a limited edition deluxe 4-disc box set. The artwork for Selected was designed by Un.titled under the able guidance of Matt Culpin, with photographic work, both for the studio and live album, created by Simon Congdon.

== Artwork ==
We were approached by Alan Wilder in the Spring of 2009, tasked with designing a record sleeve for his latest LP Selected a 25 year retrospective of his Recoil project. The initial brief was to design artwork for a standard single CD jewelcase and special edition two CD set, incorporating elements from his existing artwork but giving the album an identity all of its own. A year on and we had not only designed two CD editions but two special edition boxsets, an iPhone App, European tour posters and photography of his live set in Berlin. We always intended the project to have a raw, grimy edge offset with a clean typographic language. To achieve this we conducted a number of photographic experiments bringing together projected imagery, physical typography and found objects. The imagery represents each track featured on the album, with elements that would be identifiable to avid Recoil fans and abstract enough to ensure that Selected was an entirely new entity. The dark and textural imagery we created became the perfect accompaniment to the brooding, occasionally unsettling nature of his music.

— Un.titled, Design Agency

== Promotion ==
In support of the album, Recoil has announced details of an Events tour, A Strange Hour with Alan Wilder & Paul Kendall, with dates across Europe and in the US between March and May 2010. Each date promised to be a unique event—with special guests—and these live presentations mark the first time Recoil has ventured out of the studio. The next part of the tour kicked off with dates across North America, South America and Europe between October & December 2010.

On October 17, 2010, four remixes have been made available to download for free from the official Recoil website, under a common title Want – The Architect Mixes, in Wave, MP3 and FLAC formats. These include three versions of "Want" by Haujobb founder Daniel Myer's alias Architect (hence the title of the set), and a remix of "Jezebel" by Ehron VonAllen. Additionally, a QuickTime video for one of the remixes of "Want" accompanies the downloads.

"Selected Events" continued in 2011, featuring shows in three Baltic countries and appearances at festivals until the end of October.

The A Strange Hour in Budapest live Blu-ray was released in 2012, from the Selected Events from Recoil's tour.

== Track listing ==
=== Selected ===
1. "Strange Hours" (original version on Liquid) – 5:13
2. "Faith Healer" (original version on Bloodline) – 5:09
3. "Jezebel" (original version on Liquid) – 4:29
4. "Allelujah" (original version on subHuman) – 5:56
5. "Want" (original version on Liquid) – 5:50
6. "Red River Cargo" (original version on Unsound Methods) – 6:04
7. "Supreme" (original version on Liquid) – 6:18
8. "Prey" (original version on subHuman) – 4:52
9. "Drifting" (original version on Unsound Methods) – 5:17
10. "Luscious Apparatus" (original version on Unsound Methods) – 5:39
11. "The Killing Ground" (excerpt) (original version on subHuman) – 5:42
12. "Shunt" (original version on Unsound Methods) – 5:47
13. "Edge to Life" (original version on Bloodline) – 5:11
14. "Last Breath" (original version on Unsound Methods) – 5:24

=== Selected – Remixed ===
1. "Supreme" (True Romance) – 6:07
2. "Prey" (Shotgun mix) (originally released as a free download, December 2008) – 5:10
3. "Drifting" (Poison dub) (an edit of the version on the Drifting single) – 7:13
4. "Jezebel" (Filthy Dog mix) (an edit of the version on the Strange Hours single) – 5:41
5. "Allelujah" (Noisy Church mix) – 5:33
6. "Stalker" (Punished mix) (an edit of the version on the Stalker/Missing Piece single) – 7:00
7. "The Killing Ground" (Solid State mix) – 5:44
8. "Black Box" (excerpt) (an excerpt from the version on the Jezebel single) – 7:17
9. "5000 Years (A Romanian Elegy for Strings)" – 5:45
10. "Strange Hours '10" (featuring the Black Ships) – 5:49
11. "Missing Piece" (Night Dissolves) (an edit of the version on the Stalker/Missing Piece single) – 7:22
12. "Shunt" (Pan Sonic mix) (slightly different version of the "Pansonic mix" on the Drifting single) – 5:19
- Tracks 1, 5, 7, 9 and 10 were previously unreleased.

=== Selected – A Strange Hour ===
An early version of the A Strange Hour liveset, on CD and DVD. The DVD contains the film projected during the liveset, with 48 kHz/24bit stereo audio.

1. Recoil – "Recoil Medley"
2. Recoil – "Prey" (Shotgun mix)
3. Recoil – "Want"
4. Optical – "To Shape the Future"
5. Recoil – "Drifting" (Poison dub)
6. Recoil – "Strange Hours '10"
7. Recoil – "Allelujah" (Noisy Church mix)
8. Recoil – "The Killing Ground" (Solid State mix)
9. Depeche Mode – "Never Let Me Down Again" (Aggro mix / Digitalism remix)
10. Pan Sonic / Recoil / Speedy J – "Uranokemia" / "Shunt" (Pan Sonic mix) / "Hayfever"
11. Recoil – "Black Box" (excerpt)
12. Recoil – "Stalker" (Punished mix)
13. Recoil / Sasha – "Faith Healer" (LFO Disbeliever mix) / "Fundamental"
14. Recoil – "Shunt"
15. Recoil – "Jezebel" / "New York Nights"
