= Hydrology (disambiguation) =

Hydrology is the scientific study of the movement, distribution, and quality of water on Earth and other planets.

Hydrology may also refer to:

- Hydrology (agriculture), the study of water balance components intervening in agricultural water management
- Hydrology (album), by Recoil
- Hydrology (MDPI journal), published by MDPI
- Hydrology (Science Publishing Group journal), published by Science Publishing Group
