= The Hitmen (British band) =

English new wave band

- Origin: London, England
- Genre: New wave
- Years active: 1979–1982
- Labels: Columbia, Urgent Records, Epic (Australia & New Zealand)
- Past members: Ben Watkins; Alan Wilder; Pete Glenister; Neil Brockbank; Mike Gaffey; Stan Shaw; John Jay

The Hitmen were an English new wave band formed in 1979. They released seven singles and two albums on the Columbia label. Members of the band would later go on to have successful careers in other notable bands and in music production.

== History ==
The band were formed in 1979 and consisted of members Ben Watkins (vocals, guitar), Pete Glenister (guitar), Stan Shaw (keyboards), Neil Brockbank (bass) and Mike Gaffey (drums). Gaffey, Glenister and Watkins (each working solo or in various combinations) wrote the group's material.

In Australia, the band were known as the London Hitmen due to a naming conflict with the local band of the same name.

The band released two studio albums; Aim for the Feet in 1980 and Torn Together in 1981. The 1981 single "Bates Motel" became a minor hit, being played widely on UK radio and having its video featured on the newly-launched MTV channel in the United States. Shaw left during the recording of the second album, and was not immediately replaced; he is credited for his keyboard work on the single release of "Bates Motel", but is not listed as a group member on the parent album Torn Together (where the group is listed as a quartet).

Brockbank left before the group's final single, a non-LP release called "Ouija (Bring It Back to Me)" issued in September 1981. For live dates around this time, Alan Wilder and John Jay (of Ian Mitchell Band) were added on keyboards and bass, respectively. Neither appeared on any studio recordings issued by the Hitmen, and this line-up only played a handful of live shows before dissolving.

== After the Hitmen ==
Ben Watkins went on to join Brilliant then later form the electronic bands the Flowerpot Men and Juno Reactor, as well as working with Killing Joke's Martin 'Youth' Glover in the duo the Empty Quarter.

Pete Glenister went on to play guitar, write and produce for other artists such as Kirsty MacColl, Alison Moyet, Terence Trent D'Arby, Anni-Frid Lyngstad, Bruce Foxton, Fischer-Z and Bryan Ferry, among many others.

Alan Wilder became the keyboardist for Depeche Mode in 1982, later leaving the band in 1995 to continue working on his solo project, Recoil. The Hitmen song "Shade In, Fade Out" is sampled on Recoil's 1986 release 1 + 2.

Neil Brockbank became an audio engineer and producer for many artists including Nick Lowe, Mary Coughlan, Alison Moyet, Tanita Tikaram, Bryan Ferry and Ocean Colour Scene. He died in 2017 of cancer.

== Discography ==
=== Albums ===
- Aim for the Feet (1980), Columbia/Urgent
- Torn Together (1981), Columbia

=== Singles ===
- "Hold On to Her" (1980)
- "I Still Remember It" (1980)
- "She's All Mine" (1980)
- "O.K." (1980)
- "Bad Timing" (1981)
- "Bates Motel" (1981)
- "Ouija" (1981)
