= Your Only Friend =

Studio album by Ehron VonAllen
- Released: July 4, 2005
- Recorded: Nebula Sound Studio, Phoenix; 2004
- Genre: Synthpop, Electronica
- Length: 44:09
- Label: US: Hydrology Records
- Producer: Ehron VonAllen

Ehron VonAllen chronology
Incarnation 2 disc w/ Remix CD (2003)	Your Only Friend (2005)	God's Grandchild (2007)

Your Only Friend is the second studio album by Ehron VonAllen. Released on Hydrology Records on July 4, 2005, it was the first time VonAllen had produced his album independently. There were no specific singles pushed from the album. It was marketed as a whole work and not broken up into different songs. In fact, no remixes have ever been released from the album making it the only Ehron VonAllen cd to do so.

This album is widely considered to be a fan favorite, however while being successful, it hasn't sold as many units as his debut album "Incarnation" and "The Sin Of Nature".

The album originally was intended to be called "Attrition" which actually had artwork for the CD already drawn up with this title on it and with an entirely different cover. The song "Attrition" later was included on VonAllen's fourth studio album The Sin Of Nature.

The first track "Shattered" was originally to be a short introduction with only one verse of lyrics.

On the song "Love Is Strange" the main string theme that is heard looped throughout the song is actually a sample of three notes from Recoil's song "Strange Hours" from the album Liquid. Additionally while VonAllen usually writes his own lyrics, the ending of this song contains a few words from John Lennon's song "Oh My Love". 1 of 2 drum patterns heard at the outro of the song is a sample of the main drum pattern from Depeche Mode's "World In My Eyes". This song was more of a tribute to several of his favorite artists than anything else.

"My Desire" is sung by R&B vocalist Morgan Hinton.

"Trial of Jealousy" was the first song written for "Your Only Friend".

"The Statue of Night" is a sequel to the song "The Statue of Light"

== Track listing ==
=== 2005 release: Hydrology / 828375 5979 2 1 ===
1. "Shattered" - 4:07
2. "Die For Me" - 3:44
3. "Egyptology" - 3:45
4. "Hang On" - 4:03
5. "Love Is Strange" - 3:43
6. "My Desire" - 2:56
7. "Still Alive" - 3:32
8. "Trial Of Jealousy" - 4:34
9. "The Statue Of Night" - 3:39
10. "Judas" - 5:46
11. "Your Only Friend" - 4:21

== Re-Release 2014 ==
This album is to be reissued in fall 2014. The songs are being reworked, remixed and remastered while the artwork is staying intact. The reissue will also include never released remixes and demos from the "Your Only Friend" recording sessions. New track order uncertain.

=== 2014 release: Hydrology / Special Edition ===
Below is a preliminary list of tracks that are supposed to be on the new album and new tracks added

1. "Shattered" - Reproduced
2. "Die For Me" - 3:44
3. "Egyptology" - Reproduced (altered verse vocal tune, guitar, new drums and extra backing vocals by Morgan Hinton)
4. "Hang On" - Reproduced
5. "Love Is Strange" - Reproduced (additional drums, guitar and new lyrics at the ending to replace Lennon's)
6. "My Desire" - Reproduced (all new synth sequences)
7. "Still Alive" - Reproduced (additional drums, strings, backing vocals)
8. "Trial Of Jealousy" - Reproduced (additional drums, strings, bassline sequences)
9. "The Statue Of Night" - 3:39
10. "Judas" - Reproduced
11. "Your Only Friend" - Reproduced (entirely new production)

additional tracks that were originally written for the "Your Only Friend" album but not included on the 2004 release.

1. "1 Nation Underdog"
2. "Without The Youth"
3. "Unusual Creature"
4. "White Lights"
5. "Paradiso"

remixes being added

1. "My Heart Is Shattered" (remix of "Shattered")
2. "Die For Me" (Remix)

== Sources ==
- CDBaby.com, February 2005
- www.ehronvonallen.com (official site)
