= Gopher (disambiguation) =

A gopher, also known as a "pocket gopher" (family Geomyidae), is a burrowing rodent native to North America and Central America.

Gopher may also refer to:

== Nature ==
- Some species of ground squirrels (tribe Marmotini) of North America, particularly those formerly classified as Spermophilus, are informally referred to as "gophers"
- Gopher snake – common name of several species of genus Pituophis endemic to west or southwest of North America
- Gopher tortoise (genus Gopherus), distributed in North America
- Gopher wood, of unclear meaning, mentioned in the Bible as the building material for Noah's ark
- Gopher Plant or Paper Spurge (Euphorbia lathyris)

== Entertainment ==
- Gophers!, a British children's television programme
- "Gopher", real name Burl Smith, a character on TV show The Love Boat
- Gopher (Winnie the Pooh), a character in Walt Disney's Winnie the Pooh franchise

== Technology ==
- 9K35 Strela-10, or SA-13 "Gopher", a Soviet surface-to-air missile system
- Go gopher, a mascot of Go programming language
- Gopher (protocol), an early distributed hypertext protocol
- Gopher, an Australian term for a mobility scooter

== Other ==
- Minnesota, the "Gopher State"
- Minnesota Golden Gophers, University of Minnesota sports teams
- Gopher (train), a passenger train operated by the Great Northern Railway, USA
- Gopher (video game), an Atari 2600 game
- Gopher Gang, early 20th-century New York street gang

== See also ==
- Gofer (disambiguation)
- Gaufre, French term for a flat cake similar to waffles
