= Ehron VonAllen =

- concert shot of Ehron VonAllen live. Phoenix, Arizona

Background information
- Birth name: Aaron Christopher Allen
- Born: September 27, 1980 (age 44); Pocahontas, Arkansas
- Genres: Electronica; Alternative rock
- Occupation(s): Musician, vocalist, songwriter, record producer
- Instrument(s): Vocals, Synthesizer, Drum Programming
- Years active: 1998–present
- Labels: Hydrology, Mute, Alfa Matrix
- Website: Official Site; Ehron VonAllen database

Ehron VonAllen (pronounced Aaron Von Allen) is an American singer in the electronic pop genre, record producer, recording artist and remixer, currently based in Hollywood, California. Born Aaron Christopher Allen, VonAllen began music in a small town of 4,000 in Walnut Ridge, Arkansas. VonAllen's first run in with music was a concert video by Depeche Mode entitled "101". After graduating from high school, he moved to Dallas, Texas, to pursue a music career instead of university or military, which were both seriously considered. While living in Texas, he played shows in the popular music district of Deep Ellum in downtown Dallas.

Ehron VonAllen is well known in the electronic/synth pop European scene and has enjoyed a career of working with some of the biggest acts of the genre. His music is accessible to fans of many different genres, due to the fact each of his albums tends to be different from the previous ones. Most are based around a concept which dictates the style of the music, lyrics and artwork. It is widely known to his fan base that he is heavily influenced by his musical idol, Alan Wilder currently of the project Recoil. In 2010, he collaborated with Wilder remixing the track "Jezebel" for Recoil released through Mute Records as a downloadable EP entitled "Want" in support of the Recoil tour, "A Strange Hour".

He is also heavily influenced by David Bowie.

His instrument of choice is the synthesizer, but his main forte is in song writing, sound design, music production and editing. As quite an achievement for an independent, on September 11, 2013, he reached the 50,000 download mark for songs being purchased from all music sources on the internet since 2003, when the downloads began being tracked. Every format of his music including CD has been marketed by his own record label and media company, Hydrology Records.

He commenced recording his intended next album, 'I Am Electrovert', in 2013, collaborating alongside Jay Gordon, frontman of the multi-platinum selling band Orgy, who has production credits with Linkin Park, Korn, Crazy Town and many others. However, as of December 2020, no recording has been released.

== Release history ==
=== Incarnation, album, 2004 ===
In 2004, his career as "Ehron VonAllen" officially began when recorded his debut album, Incarnation. The producer for the album, Jamison Weddle had production credits for DMX & Neils Lofgren. During this time, VonAllen had the honor of getting a sound in the Minimoog Voyager synthesizer named after him called, "Bass For E. VonAllen", thanks to the New-age recording artist and professional sound designer, Zon Vern Pyles. A quote from Electronic Musician magazine concerning the sound "Of all the bass Presets, In the Pocket and Bass for E.Vonallen are my favorites; both are definite blasts from the past, and certainly the most authentic Moog basses I've ever heard (because that's exactly what they are!)". After this, he had dinner with Robert Moog in Nashville, not long before Moog died, fulfilling a long time wish of wanting to meet him, considering Ehron's passion for synthesizers.

Pop star CeCe Peniston was originally going to be the guest female vocalist but due to label conflicts, R&B vocalist Morgan Hinton appeared on the songs "Insecure Armies" and "Countless Contradictions" in her place. Released on his own label Hydrology Records, a two disc version of the album, containing re-inventions of the original songs, and art layout by the photographer John Hall was manufactured. The album received mostly positive reviews; most notably in Keyboard Magazine by editor and book author Mark Vail calling the album "ingeniously constructed". The double album topped the sales charts at Virgin Megastores for several straight months, even reaching No. 1 in its first two weeks of release.

=== God's Grandchild, album, summer 2007 ===
His third album, God's Grandchild, was set for a winter 2006 release date, but was delayed due to manufacturing conflicts. On July 7, 2007, the album was finally released. The album included two cover songs, "Prayers For Rain" by The Cure and "Sunday" by David Bowie. The album received mixed reviews. The original CD was discontinued in 2009 and was replaced in 2012 by a 2-disc Special Edition version with the songs being reproduced and mixed, which also included never before released songs, remixes and interviews.

=== The Sin of Nature, album, fall 2007 ===
Because of God's Grandchild delayed release, his fourth album The Sin Of Nature was released almost immediately after on September 4, 2007. This album proved to be his most unusual and ambitious album yet, which was said to be an album made for himself, and did not consider time constraints or worrying whether or not the songs had a hook in them. The CD has extremely heavy dark and religious overtones. While the CD is filed in record stores as "New Age" or "Christian", the release was officially labeled "Electronic".

That album's single titled, "Sin of Nature – (Wumpscut Version)", was remixed by Rudy Ratzinger of Wumpscut. An a cappella version of the title track was included.

=== The Perfect Lie, album, 2008 ===
The Perfect Lie began production on August 6, 2008 and was rescheduled several times each year between 2009 and 2012. VonAllen began the production himself but six months later, Roman Marisak of the band Professional Murder Music took over as producer. Marisak's vision for the album draws along the lines of a more numetal feel Ehron VonAllen album while still maintaining his unique pop electronic style. The production of the album moved to PMM Studios in Los Angeles in 2011. The album will have several guest vocalists including Morgan Hinton (who has worked on two previous albums of his) & Daniel Myer of Haujobb, Covenant and Architect. There will also be remixes available by Leaether Strip, Alien Skin and Incarnation's producer Jamison Weddle. Production on this album is officially on hold.

=== "When Music Meant Something", 2008 ===
A Digital Download EP called "When Music Meant Something" was released to cut down the length of time per release, due to the delays of making The Perfect Lie. The single contained a cover of "Nothing's Impossible" by Depeche Mode, another track called "Ode To Nitzer Ebb" which contained a few small samples of their previous work and an a cappella version of the title track.

=== I Am Electrovert, album, 2013 ===
New production began for an album titled I Am Electrovert. This album involves production by Ehron VonAllen and Jay Gordon, lead singer of Orgy. The album will contain all new material including remixes by prominent electronic groups including Haujobb, Orgy and Kant Kino. VonAllen recently finished filming the music video for the first single off the album entitled "Electrovert". As of December 2020, neither album nor single have been released.

== Discography ==
=== Albums ===
Year	Album	Additional information
2004	Incarnation	12-page booklet & Remix disc
2005	Your Only Friend	out of print
2007 / re-released 2012	God's Grandchild	2 disc special edition
2007	The Sin Of Nature	released September 4, 2007
2008	The Perfect Lie	progress unknown
2013	I Am Electrovert	progress unknown

=== Singles and EPs ===
Year	Song	B-Sides & Info	Album source
2003	Incarnation Radio Edits	out of print	Incarnation
2006	Don't Worry Anymore E.P.	out of print	God's Grandchild
2009	Sin Of Nature / Wumpscut Version E.P.	7 song EP with remixes	The Sin Of Nature
2009	When Music Meant Something E.P.	8 song EP with remixes & orig. tracks	none

=== Other work ===
Year	Project	Details
2007	IAMX – Nightlife	"Nightlife" Remix (Ehron VonAllen version)
2008	Wumpscut – Cut To See How Much I Bleed	"Cut To See" Remix (Ehron VonAllen version)
2009	Alien Skin – Burning in My Hands / single	"Burning in My Hands" Remix (Ehron VonAllen version)
2009	Depeche Mode – Peace	"Peace" Remix (Ehron VonAllen version)
2009	Oral Silence – Just Trust Me / single	"Just Trust Me" Remix (Ehron VonAllen version)
2010	Architect – The Shadow Of Eve / single	"The Shadow Of Eve" Remix (Ehron VonAllen version)
2010	Professional Murder Music – All Comes Down / single	"All Comes Down" Remix (Ehron VonAllen version)
2010	DMX – Who We Be	"Who We Be" (Ehron VonAllen's Industrial Mix)
2010	Leæther Strip – My Shadow Is Your Home / album track	"My Shadow Is Your Home" (Ehron VonAllen Mix)
2010	Recoil – Jezebel	"Jezebel" (Prophet Motive Mix)
2010	Recoil – Jezebel / single	"Jezebel" (Seductress Mix)
2010	Real Life – Send Me An Angel / single	"Send Me An Angel" (Ehron VonAllen Mix)
2011	Klutæ – We Are Nothing / album track	"We Are Nothing" (Ehron VonAllen Mix)
2011	Leæther Strip – Reunited with My Bitterness / album track	"Reunited with My Bitterness" (Ehron VonAllen Mix)
2011	Brian Vassallo – Memoirs of a Lifetime / single	"Memoirs of a Lifetime" (Ehron VonAllen Mix)
2013	Michael Jackson – They Don't Care About Us	"They Don't Care About Us" (Ehron VonAllen Mix)
2013	Haujobb – Letting The Demon's Sleep	"Letting The Demon's Sleep" (Ehron VonAllen's Electro Dubstep Mix)
2015	Dante's Inferno – Musical Theatre	composer, producer, script writing credits. Based on poem

== Summary of notable collaborators, remixers and associates ==
- Alan Wilder (Recoil, Depeche Mode): Remixing for Recoil
- Jay Gordon (Orgy): Production, Remixing
- Daniel Myer (Haujobb, Architect): Remixing, Vocals
- Rudy Ratzinger (Wumpscut): Remixing
- George Pappas (Real Life, Alien Skin): Remixing, Vocals
- Roman Marisak (Professional Murder Music): Remixing, Production
- William Branham: Narrator
- Architect: Remixing
- Leæther Strip, Klutæ: Remixing, Vocals
- Covenant, Live Synth

== See also ==
- Minimoog Voyager
- List of Moog synthesizer players
- Korg KARMA (notable users)
- Backing track
- Walnut Ridge, Arkansas (notable residents)
- List of industrial music bands
