= Nicole Blackman =

American poet (born 1971)

- Born: November 30, 1971 (age 54); New York City
- Occupations: Writer, spoken word performer
- Writing career
- Genres: Feminist, fantasy, goth, drama

Nicole Blackman (born November 30, 1971) is a New York City–born performance artist, poet, author, and vocalist.

== Literary career ==
Blackman is involved in the North American goth, spoken word, and transgressive literature scenes.

Blackman self-published three now out-of-print chapbooks: Pretty, Sweet, and Nice. The three were collected in Akashic Books' Blood Sugar (2002).

Her work as a performance artist include "Bloodwork" performed at The Kitchen/NYC in 2000, where she debuted her blood performance (and shook hands with the audience, bloodying them too), slipped secret messages into the audience's coat pockets, projected text on the street and created audio visual installations. Since then she has performed "Courtesan Tales" at PS122 art space in New York City, at The Andy Warhol Museum/Pittsburgh, and for three years at the Fierce Festival in Birmingham England. The "Courtesan Tales" are performances in which a blindfolded audience of one has a five-minute story whispered into their ear. She debuted "Harm's Way" (a multi-media performance of her email diary of working at Ground Zero) as a work in progress in New York.

After being commissioned for an audio work, "Stay Away from Lonely Places," by the British Arts Council for the UK's Art & Architecture Week in July 2006., she was again commissioned by the BAC to create a new work for the Fierce Festival—an audio tour of the Deritend neighborhood of Birmingham.

Blackman also created the piece Beloved, commissioned by the Fierce Festival and British Arts Council as a site-specific performance and installation. The piece was created expressly for the Compton Verney Museum in the British West Midlands in April 2007.

She is also a voice-over performer, and has been used in campaigns for Chrysler, Ford, Blockbuster, Lysol, and Verizon, and channels including Turner Classic Movies, Discovery Health Channel, Cartoon Network, Court TV, PBS and Cinemax.

== Music career ==
Some of Blackman's poems have been recorded. Her first recording was a 7" single from Cleveland label Carcrashh (sic). Both tracks were recorded by Kramer (Bongwater, Shimmy Disc records). Some have been reworked into lyrics, most notably on The Golden Palominos' 1996 album Dead Inside, for which she wrote all the lyrics and did vocals on all eleven songs.

Her vocal style leans more toward spoken word/chant rather than traditional pop music singing. She collaborated with Alan Wilder's Recoil project on Mute Records. She contributed to Recoil's 2000 Liquid album.

Blackman opened on the 1995 U.S. Beat By Beat tour for KMFDM, and her piece "Indictment" was later re-recorded as "Dogma" on KMFDM's Xtort album (Wax Trax!/TVT). She was a featured spoken word performer at Lollapalooza in 1994, collaborated with Scanner, John Van Eaton, and Mark Blasquez in Europe, where she opened at festivals for Nick Cave in Belgium and Placebo in the Netherlands. She's also done a number of small tours for her spoken word performances in the U.S. and Europe.

She refers to her style of spoken word as "broken word," and in the late 1990s, she appeared frequently on Liza Richardson's "Man in the Moon" spoken word show on KCRW in Santa Monica. She is frequently invited to perform and teach at poetry workshops around the world.

== Selected musical collaborations ==
- Indictment / I Believe (1995, Carcrashh); 7" single, produced by Kramer
- "What I Want for Christmas" on the compilation A Christmas Gift for You from Zero Hour Records (1995, Zero Hour)
- Poemfone: New Word Order: Two tracks with the electronic music outfit Space Needle, who provided backing music on the spoken word pieces "You Will" and "Caroline," and her live performances as an opening act for KMFDM's 1995 US tour
- Xtort by KMFDM (1996, Wax Trax!); vocals on the track "Dogma"
- Dead Inside by The Golden Palominos (1996, Restless); vocals on all tracks
- Hashisheen by Bill Laswell (1999, Sub Rosa); voices on the tracks "Freya Stark at Alamut," "Hashish Poem," "Assassinations," and "Assassinations 2"
- Liquid by Recoil (2000, Mute); vocals on the tracks "Breath Control," "Chrome," and "Want"
- Very Introspective, Actually: A Tribute to the Pet Shop Boys (2001, Dancing Ferret); provided the vocals for a cover of "West End Girls" with John Van Eaton
- Various recordings of her live spoken word performances with Scanner, some of which appear on the Americans for Radio Diversity compilation and website
- The Man on the Burning Tightrope by Firewater (2005, Jetset); voice on "The Truth Hurts"
