= SubHuman =

subHuman

Studio album by Recoil
- Released: 9 July 2007
- Recorded: Autumn 2005 – early 2007
- Genre: Electronic
- Length: 61:14
- Label: Mute
- Producer: Alan Wilder

Recoil chronology
Liquid (2000)	subHuman (2007)	Selected (2010)

Singles from subHuman
- 1. "Prey" Released: 25 June 2007; 2. "Killing Ground" Released: 1 October 2007

Professional ratings
Review scores
Source	Rating
AllMusic	3/5 stars
Release Magazine	9/10 stars
Soundsect	4.5/5 stars

SubHuman (stylized as subHuman) is the sixth studio album by Recoil. Alan Wilder stated in a September 2006 YouTube greeting that there would be a new album coming in spring or early summer 2007. On 23 April 2007, he released information regarding the album via Myspace and his official website, Shunt. "subHuman" was released on 9 July 2007, in Europe and 14 August 2007, in the US. It was made available in several formats, including standard CD, gatefold vinyl, and a special CD/DVD edition. The CD/DVD edition featured stereo, 5.1 surround, and exclusive "ambient" mixes. Additionally, the DVD included all music videos that were produced at the time of the album's release.

Working with Wilder on this album was New Orleans native bluesman Joe Richardson, who contributed vocals, guitar, and harmonica. Also working on subHuman was his wife and assistant, Hepzibah Sessa, and Paul Kendall, who worked on the album Liquid (2000) and mixes from the 1997 Unsound Methods album. Another contributor was English singer Carla Trevaskis, who has worked with Fred de Faye (Eurythmics), Cliff Hewitt (Apollo 440) and Dave McDonald (Portishead).

The track "99 to Life" refers to the maximum jail sentence handed out, short of the death penalty. This is based on a real story according to Richardson in an interview with the industrial music magazine Side-Line.

== Track listing ==
=== CD: Mute / CD STUMM 279 (United Kingdom) ===
No.	Title	Length
1.	"Prey"	8:21
2.	"Allelujah"	9:26
3.	"5000 Years"	6:37
4.	"The Killing Ground"	9:55
5.	"Intruders"	11:36
6.	"99 to Life"	8:10
7.	"Backslider"	7:09

=== CD/DVD: Mute / LCD STUMM 279 (United Kingdom) ===
Includes CD album as above plus a DVD featuring:

- High-quality 24-bit and 48 kHz recording of subHuman
- 5.1 DTS and AC3 surround sound versions of subHuman
- Exclusive ambient re-working (reduction mix) of subHuman also in 24-bit/48 kHz quality
- Music promo videos:
1. "Faith Healer"
2. "Drifting"
3. "Stalker"
4. "Strange Hours"
5. "Jezebel"
6. "Shunt" (hidden video)
7. "Electro Blues for Bukka White" (2000 mix) (hidden video)

== Credits and personnel ==
- Alan Wilder – all music
- Joe Richardson – lead vocal (1, 3, 4, 6, 7), guitar, harmonica
- Carla Trevaskis – lead vocal (2, 5)
- John Wolfe – bass guitar
- Richard Lamm – drums
- Hepzibah Sessa – violin, viola
- Lee Funnell – photography
- Jesse Holborn at Design Holborn – art direction, design
- Texas Treefort Studios – recording complex

== Singles ==
=== "Prey" ===
25 June 2007

==== 7": Mute / MUTE 372 (UK) ====
1. "Prey" (single version edit) – 5:56
2. "Prey" (reduction edit)

==== Download: Mute / iMUTE 372 (UK) ====
1. "Prey" (single version edit) – 5:56

==== Download: Mute / LiMute 372 (UK) ====
1. "Prey" (single version) – 5:56
2. "Prey" (radio edit) – 3:56
3. "Prey" (reduction) – 6:11
4. "Prey" – 8:03

==== Free download ====
8 December 2008

1. "Prey" (shotgun mix)

=== "The Killing Ground" ===
==== Free download ====
1 October 2007

1. "The Killing Ground" (The Slips RMX)

=== "Prey/Allelujah" ===
25 February 2008

==== Limited edition enhanced CD single: Mute / MUTE 372 (UK) ====
1. "Prey" (radio edit)
2. "Prey" (album version)
3. "Allelujah" (reduction)
4. "Allelujah" (film video)
