= Empirion =

British industrial dance band

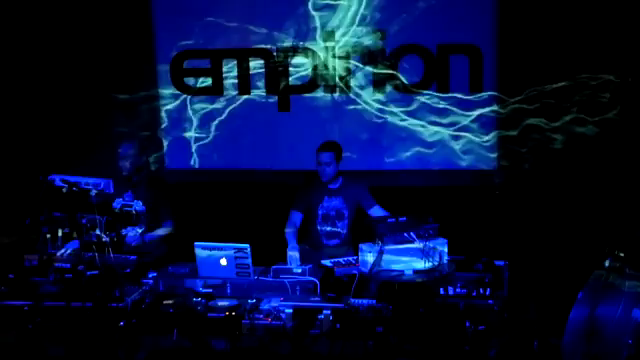
- Empirion live in London; 7 April 2011

Background information
- Origin: Essex, England
- Genres: Techno, electronic, industrial
- Years active: 1993–present
- Labels: XL, Beggars Banquet, Wanted Records
- Members: Austin Morsley; Jamie Smart
- Past members: Bob Glennie
- Website: www.empirion.org

Empirion are a British industrial dance music group, originating from Essex, England. They were formed in 1993, and the original line-up consisted of Austin Morsely, Bob Glennie and Jamie Smart.

== Career ==
=== 1993-1994: Beginnings ===
Smart was a resident DJ at the Essex nightclubs, Oscars in Clacton and TooToo's in Frating. He provided the vehicle for the band to release their music through their own record label, Wanted Records, and later went on to support the Prodigy. Morsely and Glennie met on the local rave scene. They had both been playing around with basic music equipment for a few years, and came together when Morsley purchased a Roland W-30 synthesiser which eventually spawned the track, "Narcotic Influence". The track was released and distributed by the band in November 1993 and, initially pressing 500 copies on vinyl, it went on to sell nearly 5,000 copies.

=== 1994-1998: Signing to XL Recordings ===
They followed "Narcotic Influence" with two singles in 1994, "Quark" and the double A-side "Ciao" / "Advanced Technology". During the latter part of 1994, XL Recordings offered them a recording contract.

XL chose to re-release "Narcotic Influence" in 1995 accompanied by a music video, and it went on to sell 15,000 copies and peaked at No. 64 on the UK Singles Chart. This was followed up with the release of the single "Jesus Christ" (1995) and the album Advanced Technology in 1996.

During this time, the band toured both the UK and Europe including the Phoenix Festival in 1994 and 1995, and Tribal Gathering in 1997 alongside Kraftwerk. They also toured with the Prodigy. They also remixed the Prodigy's "Firestarter".

The band toured the United States in 1997 as a part of the big top tour, alongside Moby, 808 State, System 7 and BT. The same year, they issued "BETA" (UK #75) featuring remixes by Front 242 and Doc Scott, followed later in the year by "See Yourself" as a vinyl-only release.

=== 1998-2011: Hiatus and Glennie's death ===
Tragedy then struck the group when Glennie was diagnosed with a brain tumour, and the band was eventually put on hiatus when it became impossible to complete the follow-up to Advanced Technology. Empirion parted ways with XL Recordings in 1998, and Glennie died of cancer in 2005.

Morsley went on to start his own project called KLOQ, and released several singles throughout the 2000s culminating in his debut album, Move Forward, in 2008. Kloq released their second studio album Begin Again on 8 October 2013 via Metropolis Records. Smart continued to DJ, and remixed for Leeroy Thornhill alongside Pete Crossman as Controlled Change, for the Flightcrank single "Amazing" in 2001, and the tracks "Machines" and "Depression" in 2010 on the Electric Tastebuds label.

=== 2011-present: Reformation ===
In 2011, Smart and Morsley came back together under the Empirion name with a remix of the Victory Pill track, "Burnout". They also embarked on several live dates throughout Europe, and made plans for some new material.

In April 2018, Empirion announced a new album, Resume. In September 2018, they released an EP via new record label, Dependent Records.

== Discography ==
=== Studio albums ===
- Advanced Technology (1996)
- Resume (2019)

=== Extended plays ===
- Narcotic Influence (1997; remixes by Dave Clarke, Secret Knowledge & Meat Beat Manifesto)
- b.e.t.a. (1997)
- I Am Electronic / Red Noise (2018)
- ADSR (2019)

=== Singles ===
- "Ayahuasca"
- "PH1"
- "Quark"
- "Narcotic Influence 2"
- "Ciao" (remixes by Front 242 & The Advent)
- "Jesus Christ"
- "New Religion"
- "BETA" (remixes by Doc Scott)
- "See Yourself"
- "Ciao" (Ciao mix)
- "Quark" (Remix)
- "I Am Electronic"
- "Red Noise"

=== Remixes ===
- The Prodigy - "Firestarter"
- Front 242 - "Headhunter"
- Terrorvision - "Bad Actress"
- Cubanate - "Voids"
- Victory Pill - "Burnout"
- Hate Dept. - "Release It"
- Fluke - "Bullet"
- Vitro - "Mentally Dull"
- Hum - "Stars"
- Praga Khan - "Luv U Still"
- Twelve Trees - "Lost Tribe"
- China Drum - "Sleazeball"
- Hyperdex-1-sect - "Mind"
