= Begin Again (Kloq album) =

Studio album by KLOQ
- Released: 8 October 2013
- Recorded: July 2013
- Genre: Indie rock, Punk rock, electronic rock
- Length: 40:33
- Label: Metropolis Records
- Producer: Oz Morsley, KLOQ

KLOQ chronology
Move Forward (2008)	Begin Again (2013)	Behind The Screams (2016)

Singles from Begin Again
- 1. "High" Released: 8 October 2013

Professional ratings
Review scores
Source	Rating
Side-Line	8/10 stars
Brutal Resonance	8/10 stars
U&I Music Magazine	8/10 stars
New Noise Magazine	3.5/5 stars
Soundscape Magazine	9/10 stars

Begin Again is the second album by British electronic rock band KLOQ, released 8 October 2013. The album was released via Metropolis Records.

The album reached No. 1 in its 13th week in the European Alternative Charts and also reached No. 1 on the Rockadia new release chart in its first week.

== Track listing ==
All tracks are written by Morsley, Goodwin and Jackson. Also writing on the album were Aldridge who co wrote and performed on Crash and Jenny and Freeman who co wrote Begin Again, Bleed, Setting Sun and Zero One.

No.	Title	Length
1.	"True Crusader"	3:29
2.	"Chainsaw"	3:51
3.	"Jenny"	3:25
4.	"Setting Sun"	3:40
5.	"High"	4:35
6.	"Bleed"	4:17
7.	"Crash"	3:32
8.	"Step Up"	3:56
9.	"Zero One"	5:39
10.	"Begin Again"	4:19

== Personnel ==
- Dean Goodwin – lead vocals (all tracks except "Jenny")
- Oz Morsley – Synths and Programming
- Tim Jackson (Bass player) – bass
- Alex Baker – drums
- Roy 'Buster' Foster - guitars
- Jason Aldridge - guest vocals (Jenny and Crash)
