= KLOQ (band) =

British electronic rock band

Kloq
- Origin: Chelmsford, England
- Genres: Electronic rock, alternative rock, punk rock, indie rock
- Years active: 2005–present
- Labels: Metropolis Records, Out of Line Music
- Members: Dean Goodwin; Oz Morsely; Tim Jackson; Chris Jacobs
- Past members: Steve Wilson; Alex Baker; Greg Cumbers; Tom Freeman
- Website: Official website

KLOQ (pronounced "clock") is an electronic rock band that was formed in Chelmsford, Essex in 2005 by Oz Morsley of Empirion. The current lineup is Dean Goodwin (Vocals), Oz Morsley (Keys, Electronics), Tim Jackson (Bass), and Chris Jacobs (Drums). Kloq has released two studio albums: Move Forward (2008) and Begin Again (2013).

The band's music and sound have evolved through many genres over the years including trance, EBM, electro-industrial, alternative rock, punk rock and electronic rock.

== History ==
=== Pre-Kloq (1993-2010) ===
Oz's first project was electro-acid band Empirion. Having a major hit with the 12" acid house anthem "Narcotic Influence" Oz and Empirion were Signed by XL Recordings and enjoyed relative commercial success. Empirion worked closely with The Prodigy, joining them on one of their tours of Europe and also re-mixing the No. 1 hit Firestarter. This appeared on Prodigy's single and vinyl release. Front man Dean Goodwin over the years has been in many indie rock bands including the 'Thieves of Time' where he released the single 'More To Give' and the EP 'Scream And Shout' and also featured on some compilation albums. Tim is currently endorsed by Warwick and has featured in many bands throughout the years most notably 'British Intelligence' who played on the BBC Introducing at the Reading and Leeds Festivals in 2009. Alex Baker is Skindred's current touring drum tech and has also done the rounds, playing in the band Seven Summers which included Matt Cardle. Not having a record contract, they distributed their music independently reaching No. 30 on the Official UK Album Downloads Chart, No. 11 on the Official UK Independent Album Charts for week ending 25 December 2010 and No. 1 on the Official UK Independent Album Breakers Charts for week ending 2 December 2010. The album's success was mainly a backlash from Matts success on the show. The band split in 2010 when Matt won The X Factor. Band members Dean, Tim and Alex have crossed paths over the years either being on the same bill and even performing at the same festivals.

=== Move Forward (2008-2011) ===
The original band hailed from Chelmsford, Essex and was started by Oz as a studio project. His vision was to create a live festival band. They released the 'We're Just Physical' EP in March 2007 and the 'Ibiza' EP shortly after Move Forward was released on 24 June 2008 through Out of Line Music. The record featured such tracks as club classic 'Ibiza' along with 'We're Just Physical' & 'You Never Know' co-written and performed by Douglas McCarthy from Nitzer Ebb. The album reached the No.1 spot in the Deutsche Alternative Charts and spent several weeks there and also ended the year in No.2 in the Top Album International Act behind only Nine Inch Nails. Oz added Tim Jackson on Bass guitar to give the band's music more of a live sound, along with the touring vocalist Greg Cumbers. After touring Europe for the next two years, the band took some time out to write their next album.

=== Begin Again (2013) ===
Early 2012 after the departure of touring vocalist Greg, the band implemented the permanent addition of front man Dean Goodwin. This was shortly followed by the addition of Alex Baker former drummer of Matt Cardles old band Seven Summers and earthtone9. The band finished the recording of their second studio album Begin Again in the summer of 2013. Which was then released on Tuesday 8 October 2013 with Metropolis Records. They showcased the album at a sold out Scala (club) in London, King's Cross, on Friday 18 October where Bloc Party, Alt-J and XFM DJ Sunta Templeton all performed DJ sets. The album reached No.1 on the Rockadia new release chart in its first week and was No.9 in the iTunes Alternative New Releases chart also in its first week. Begin Again also reached No.11 in its 9th week in the European Alternative Charts. KLOQ performed Begin Again at the Alt-J end of tour after party at The Jamm in Brixton, Essex Festival Brownstock Music Festival, and at Electronic festival Bas 2013 where Heaven 17 and Saffron (singer) from Republica also performed. The album received mostly positive reviews which included Side-Line magazine stating 'I didn't exactly expect this kind of album, but I’ve to say that Kloq is a band that doesn't repeat itself preferring to innovate and simply go with the flow. After a few listens, I can only recommend this magnificent production.' New Noise Magazine gave the album 3.5/5 in their positive review of Begin Again, saying 'Imagine putting The Killers, Ke$ha, Eminem, and Blur into a blender and hitting the "on" button. You might be surprised to find out that this combination makes a pretty damn good smoothie. The name of this new drink is Begin Again.' Brutal Resonance rated the album at 8/10. Soundscape gave a review of the album which stated that 'one track that doesn't quite slot into the bigger picture and it's a shame because otherwise Begin Again would have been a flawless release.'

=== The Gun EP (2015) ===
In 2015 the band announced via their Twitter and Facebook page that they would be releasing new material before the end of the year. The Gun EP was released on 18 September 2015 and the EP launch party was held at London's Cargo where the band played all 4 songs from the EP along with songs from previous albums Move Forward and Begin Again. The Gun EP received several good reviews along with the Electricity Club and Side-Line where Side-Line gave the EP an 8 out of 10. The Gun EP was also given an 8/10 review by Soundscape magazine who stated "The Gun is an Excellent listen that shows a great deal of talent".

=== Behind The Screams (2016) ===
Kloq released their third studio album 10 June 2016. The band were scheduled to release a trilogy of EPs starting with The Gun, which was released late 2015, but later they decided to release the album. The single "Behind The Screams" reached No. 5 on the German Alternative single charts and the album reached No. 3 on the German alternative album charts. The band toured the album in the UK with Inertia, who are fronted by Killing Joke keyboard player Reza Uhdin.

=== Other work ===
Along with the transformation over the years, KLOQ have also remixed tracks for various artists. In June 2008, KLOQ's remix of Sunscreem's "Coda" was included on the single and EP for that song. In 2009, their remix of "Everything I Made" was included on Mesh's Only Better EP and then later in 2011 was also included on the Deluxe Edition of Mesh's An Alternative Solution. In September 2013, KLOQ also remixed the Douglas McCarthy track "Move On" from his album Kill Your Friends. They have also had tracks appear on compilation albums. In January 2006, the track "Kloq Music 2" was included on Solstice Black Compilation #01 and in February 2007, "You Never Know" (which had guest vocals by Douglas McCarthy) appeared on Machineries of Joy Vol. 4. In June 2008, "I Never Said" was released on Awake The Machines Vol. 6.

== Band members ==
=== Current members ===
- Dean Goodwin - Lead Vocals
- Oz Morsley - Keys/Electronics/Programming
- Tim Jackson - Bass
- Chris Jacobs - Drums

=== Touring musicians ===
- Roy 'Buster' Foster - Guitar

=== Past members ===
- Steve Wilson - Drums
- Alex Baker - Drums
- Greg Cumbers - Vocals
- Tom Freeman - Vocals

== Discography ==
- Move Forward (2008)
- Begin Again (2013)
- Behind the Screams (2016)
