= Gofer =

A gofer is an errand runner.

Gofer may also refer to:

- Gofer (programming language), educational version of Haskell
- GOFER, mnemonic device for a decision-making method

== See also ==
- Gofer wood, used to construct Noah's Ark in the Bible
- Gopher (disambiguation)
