= 1 + 2 (album) =

Studio album by Recoil
- Released: August 1986
- Genre: Electronica
- Length: 33:01
- Label: Mute – STUMM 31
- Producer: Alan Wilder

Recoil chronology
1 + 2 (1986)	Hydrology (1988)

Professional ratings
Review scores
Source	Rating
AllMusic	4/5 stars

1 + 2 is the debut album by Recoil, released in August 1986. The CD and cassette version were released two years later with Recoil's second release, Hydrology.

Alan Wilder had always experimented with his own ideas, but when Daniel Miller heard some demos (recorded on a Portastudio, a 4-track cassette machine) and asked to reproduce them, Recoil became a musical entity. The early recordings show Wilder's position as a pioneer in sampling technology and demonstrated how he could completely change the "Depeche Mode" sound into something new. 1 + 2, his first collection of demos, was inconspicuously released as a twelve-inch EP the same year as his band Depeche Mode's fifth studio album, Black Celebration.

== Re-release ==
The CD of Hydrology Plus 1 + 2 was re-released in 2007, again on Mute Records. The track listing and artwork remain the same.

== Track listing ==
All tracks are written by Alan Wilder.

No.	Title	Length
1.	"1"	14:24
2.	"2"	18:37

== Credits and personnel ==
- Alan Wilder – production, instruments
- T + CP Associates – sleeve photography and design

== Sample sources ==
The recording is largely built upon samples of other music, primarily by other Mute Records artists, to avoid legal issues during an era when such approach to music-making was not overtly common.

The samples include the following:

- Depeche Mode – "Any Second Now (Altered)"
- Depeche Mode – "If You Want"
- Depeche Mode – "The Sun and the Rainfall"
- Depeche Mode – "Oberkorn (It's a Small Town)"
- Depeche Mode – "The Great Outdoors!"
- Depeche Mode – "Shouldn't Have Done That"
- Depeche Mode – "Tora! Tora! Tora!"
- Depeche Mode – "Shake the Disease (Edit the Shake)"
- Depeche Mode – "Pipeline"
- Depeche Mode – "Blasphemous Rumours"
- Kraftwerk – "Radioaktivität"
- Kraftwerk – "Uran"
- Kraftwerk – "Radioland"
- Duet Emmo – "Or So It Seems"
- Duet Emmo – "Heart of Hearts"
- The Hitmen – "Shade In, Fade Out"
- The voice of Daniel Miller
- Random radio broadcasts
