= Maggie Estep =

American poet (1963 - 2014)

- Born: Margaret Ann Estep; March 20, 1963; Summit, New Jersey, U.S.
- Died: February 12, 2014 (aged 50); Albany, New York, U.S.
- Occupations: Writer; poet; spoken word artist
- Website: www.maggieestep.com

Margaret Ann "Maggie" Estep (March 20, 1963 – February 12, 2014) was an American writer and poet, best known for coming to prominence during the height of the spoken word and poetry slam performance rage. She published seven books and released two spoken word albums: No More Mr. Nice Girl and Love is a Dog From Hell.

== Biography ==
Margaret Ann Estep was born in 1963 in Summit, New Jersey. As a poet, she emerged in the early 1990s when grunge was the height of fashion and her "direct, aggressive and uncompromisingly modern" poetry was highly accessible.

Estep appeared on Lollapalooza's third stage in 1994, and featured on MTV's Spoken Word Unplugged, PBS's The United States of Poetry, and on Season 3 of HBO's Def Poetry. Her video for her spoken word track "Hey Baby" received moderate rotation on MTV and was highlighted on MTV's Beavis & Butt-head. She also contributed vocals to two songs on Recoil's 1997 album Unsound Methods. In 2003 she wrote sleevenotes for the Talking Heads box set Once in a Lifetime.

Estep went on to write many novels, including Diary of an Emotional Idiot, the Ruby Murphy mystery trilogy, Gargantuan, Hex and Flamethrower, and Alice Fantastic. Hex was named New York Times Notable Book for 2003. She had, for several years, been at work on The Angelmakers, a novel about 19th Century female gangsters and the founding of animal rights.

== Death ==
Estep suffered a heart attack on February 10, 2014, at her home in Hudson, New York, and died from complications two days later in an Albany hospital, aged 50. She was survived by her mother and three half-siblings.

== Discography ==
Studio albums

- No More Mr. Nice Girl (1994, NuYo/Imago)
- Love is a Dog From Hell (1997, Mouth Almighty Records/Mercury)

Compilation appearances

- Skid Row Wine, on compilation Kicks, Joy, Darkness: A Tribute to Jack Kerouac (1997)

Music videos

- "Hey Baby" (1994, dir. Mark Pellington)
- "Vicious" (1997, dir. Steve Buscemi)

== Bibliography ==
- Diary of an Emotional Idiot: A Novel, Harmony, 1997, ISBN 9780517701799; Counterpoint LLC, 2003, ISBN 9781887128988
- Soft Maniacs: Stories, Simon & Schuster, 1999, ISBN 9780684863337
- Hex: A Ruby Murphy Mystery. Three Rivers Press. 2003. ISBN 9781400048373.; Crown Publishing Group, 10 March 2010, 978-0-307-53082-0
- Love Dance of the Mechanical Animals: Confessions, Highly Subjective Journalism, Old Rants and New Stories, Three Rivers Press, 2003, ISBN 9781400047550
- Gargantuan: A Ruby Murphy Mystery. Three Rivers Press. 2004. ISBN 9780609610336.; Crown Publishing Group, 24 March 2010, ISBN 978-0-307-52576-5
- Flamethrower: A Ruby Murphy Mystery. Three Rivers Press. 2006. ISBN 9781400082735.; Crown Publishing Group, 31 March 2010, ISBN 978-0-307-52381-5
- Alice Fantastic. Akashic Books. 2009. ISBN 9781933354811.; Akashic Books, 2013, 978-1-61775-005-2
