= Move Forward =

Studio album by KLOQ
- Released: 26 June 2008
- Recorded: February 2008
- Genre: EBM, electronic rock, industrial, EDM
- Length: 61:39
- Label: Out of Line Music
- Producer: Oz Morsley

KLOQ chronology
Move Forward (2008)	Begin Again (2013)

Singles from Begin Again (Kloq Album)
- 1. "We're Just Physical EP" Released: 9 February 2007; 2. "Ibiza EP" Released: 8 October 2007

Professional ratings
Review scores
Source	Rating
Side-Line	9/10 stars
Dark Sonus	4.5/5 stars
Terrorverlag	8.5/10 stars
Reflections Of Darkness	9/10 stars
Uselinks	10/10 stars

Move Forward is the debut album by British electronic rock band KLOQ, released 26 June 2008. The album was released via Out of Line Music.

The album reached No. 1 on the Deutsche Alternative Charts, spending 7 weeks there and was No. 7 also on that chart's album of the year chart. Due to the success of the album, the album also finished the year at No. 2 on the International Album Charts only behind Nine Inch Nails.

== Track listing ==
All tracks are written by Morsley unless stated

No.	Title	Length
1.	"You Never Know" (Written by Oz Morsley, Douglas McCarthy)	3:14
2.	"I Never Said" (Vocals by Greg Cumbers)	6:10
3.	"Ibiza" (Written by Amnesia)	7:18
4.	"We're Just Physical" (Written by Oz Morsley, Douglas McCarthy)	3:37
5.	"So Long Cylon"	6:29
6.	"Kloq Film 1" (Vocals performed by Lucia Holm (Sunscreem))	7:51
7.	"Move Forward" (Vocals by Greg Cumbers)	6:01
8.	"Connecting" (Vocals by Greg Cumbers)	5:25
9.	"My Safe Place" (Vocals by Paolo Morena)	4:55
10.	"Lucky Star" (Written by Madonna)	5:43
11.	"KM1"	6:16

== Personnel ==
- Oz Morsley – synths, programming
- Douglas McCarthy - guest vocals ("You Never Know" and "We're Just Physical")
- Greg Cumbers - guest vocals ("I Never Said", "Move Forward" and "Connecting")
- Lucia Holm - guest vocals ("Kloq Film 1")
- Paolo Morena - guest vocals ("My Safe Place")
