= Love Is a Dog from Hell =

Love is a Dog From Hell

Studio album by Maggie Estep
- Released: July 1, 1997
- Genres: Spoken word, trip hop, ambient, alternative rock
- Length: 38:12
- Label: Mouth Almighty/Mercury
- Producers: Knox Chandler, Maggie Estep, Steve Lyon

Maggie Estep chronology
No More Mr. Nice Girl (1994)	Love is a Dog From Hell (1997)

Love is a Dog From Hell is the second and final studio album by American spoken word artist Maggie Estep. It was released on July 1, 1997 via Mouth Almighty and Mercury Records. The album represents a musical departure from Estep's previous album, No More Mr. Nice Girl. It features spoken word tracks that are influenced by various electronic music genres, such as ambient, techno and trip hop, as well as "straight-on rock songs."

The album also includes a cover of the Lou Reed song, "Vicious", from Transformer. A music video for the cover was directed by Steve Buscemi and features an appearance by Reed.

== Critical reception ==
Professional ratings
Review scores
Source	Rating
AllMusic	3/5 stars
Christgau's Consumer Guide	(2-star Honorable Mention)

The album generally received positive reviews. Stephen Thomas Erlewine of Allmusic wrote: "Although Maggie Estep's poetry, prose and songs lose some power when they are not seen live, Love Is a Dog from Hell is a more effective album than her debut, No More Mister Nice Girl. Estep sounds more comfortable in the studio than before, and the musical backdrops are a little sharper," while also describing her words as "stellar, capturing her acidic wit at its biting best." Tom Roe of CMJ also praised the album, stating: "Estep sounds more at home in this environment than making all that pseudo-metal noise." He also compared Estep to other "poets with musical sides", such as John S. Hall and Laurie Anderson, while noting the newly introduced ambient and techno elements in her music. Village Voice critic Robert Christgau named "Emotional Idiot", "Jenny's Shirt", and "Scab Maids on Speed" as highlights while giving the album an honorable mention in his May 1997 "Consumer Guide" column.

== Track listing ==
1. "Master of Lunacy" – 3:52
2. "I'm an Emotional Idiot" – 2:09
3. "Mrs. McCormick" – 0:08
4. "Gum" – 3:39
5. "Stalk Me" – 3:07
6. "Portnoy's Psychiatric Complaint" – 0:27
7. "Vicious" (Lou Reed) – 3:00
8. "Fireater" – 4:17
9. "David Cronenberg" – 0:35
10. "(Writer Guy) I Want Mangos" – 3:37
11. "Jenny's Shirt" – 4:12
12. "How to Get Free Hamburgers" – 4:19
13. "Miles Howard Chandler" – 0:08
14. "Scab Maids On Speed" – 1:33
15. "Welcome To The Monkeyhouse" – 3:59

== Personnel ==
- Maggie Estep – vocals, arrangement, composition, production

Guest speakers

- Rick Moody
- Pat Place
- Michael Portnoy

Additional personnel

- Knox Chandler – arrangement, composition, bass, cello, guitar, loops, production, programming, sampling, vocals, toy piano
- Paul Garisto – drums
- Margery Greenspan – art direction
- Steve Lyon – arrangement, engineering, production, programming
- George Marino – mastering
- Roger Scheepers – assistant engineering
- Dan Yashiz – assistant engineering

== Chart positions ==
Chart (1997)	Peak position
CMJ Top 200	75
