= No More Mr. Nice Girl =

Studio album by Maggie Estep
- Released: April 26, 1994
- Genre: Spoken word, alternative rock
- Length: 42:28
- Label: Nuyo, Imago
- Producer: Steve Boyer, Maggie Estep (exec.), Jason M. Solomon (exec.)

Maggie Estep chronology
No More Mr. Nice Girl (1994)	Love is a Dog From Hell (1997)

No More Mr. Nice Girl is the debut album by American poet and spoken word artist Maggie Estep. It was released on April 26, 1994, via Nuyo and Imago Records. The album sold more than 30,000 copies, which was considered as "a modest showing by the recording industry but a clear bestseller by poetry standards."

The video for the track "Hey Baby" gained rotation on MTV and was featured on an episode of Beavis and Butt-head.

== Critical reception ==
Professional ratings
Review scores
Source	Rating
AllMusic	3/5 stars

The album received generally positive reviews. Stephen Thomas Erlewine of AllMusic stated: "...the musical numbers are a little awkward, but Estep's words are vicious, cutting, smart, provocative and funny." He also further added: "The music may have dated and so has some of the pop culture references, but Estep's words retain their power on No More Mister Nice Girl." Stereo Review wrote: "Estep is really more out of the beatnik performance tradition, and so the music on No More Mister Nice Girl is essentially functional, a post-modern rock equivalent of bongo drums at a poetry reading."

In The Trouser Press guide to '90s rock, Ira Robbins wrote: "Even though her solo performances seethe with a star quality combination of charisma and content that should make such crutches superfluous, Estep's album, No More Mr. Nice Girl, finds her so bent on coloring within the lines of rock song structure that she sacrifices her usual slashing intensity for mere melodicism."

== Legacy ==
In The A.V. Club's obituary of Estep, Sean O'Neal wrote: "Like other spoken-word artists of the grunge era such as King Missile (and even Henry Rollins, if you like), Maggie Estep married her aggressive, sardonic verse to rock music, on albums such as 1994’s No More Mister Nice Girl. Tracks like “I’m Not A Normal Girl” and “The Stupid Jerk I’m Obsessed With” found Estep embracing her own neuroses and taking aim at boringly conventional idiots—two of the guiding philosophies of Generation X."

== Track listing ==
1. "Hey Baby" – 3:22
2. "I'm Not a Normal Girl" – 2:18
3. "Paradise Lost" – 3:58
4. "Even If" – 3:42
5. "Car Guy" – 0:10
6. "The Stupid Jerk I'm Obsessed With" – 2:15
7. "My Life of Gardening" – 3:35
8. "Fuck Me" – 2:26
9. "Scarification" – 3:09
10. "Pee Lady" – 0:27
11. "Sex Goddess of the Western Hemisphere" – 2:42
12. "I Swear" – 2:56
13. "Vegetable Omelet" – 0:37
14. "Rip Trip Strip" – 2:47
15. "Ingeborg, Mistress of the Dark" – 3:12
16. "Bad Day at the Beauty Salon" – 4:52

== Personnel ==
- Maggie Estep – vocals, production (exec.)

Session musicians

- Knox Chandler – cello
- Steve Dansiger – drums
- Julia Murphy – bass
- Pat Place – guitar

Additional personnel

- Chris Albert – engineering, mixing
- Steve Boyer – mixing, production
- Barbara Lipke – assistant engineering
- Gail Marowitz – art direction, design
- Jason M. Solomon – production (exec.)
- Leon Zervos – mastering
