= Liquid (Recoil album) =

Studio album by Recoil
- Released: 21 March 2000
- Recorded: July 1998 – June 1999
- Studio: The Thin Line (Sussex)
- Genre: Electronica
- Length: 60:04
- Label: Mute
- Producer: Alan Wilder

Recoil chronology
Unsound Methods (1997)	Liquid (2000)	subHuman (2007)

Professional ratings
Review scores
Source	Rating
AllMusic	4/5 stars
Release Magazine	8/10 stars

Liquid is the fifth studio album by the British musical project Recoil, released by Mute Records on 21 March 2000. It was recorded at Alan Wilder's home studio, The Thin Line, in Sussex, during sessions that lasted from July 1998 to June 1999. The album was produced by Wilder, with production assistance and co-ordination by Hepzibah Sessa, and additional production and sound design by PK.

== Background ==
Liquid's music continues in much the same vein as Recoil's previous album, Unsound Methods, but it is considered to be a concept album revolving around a near-death experience in 1994. Wilder and his partner, Hepzibah Sessa, were driving in Scotland and a Tornado Bomber hit a hillside in front of them, and two airmen were killed. The idea of the album, especially the bookending track "Black Box" (read by Reto Bühler), centered on what was going through the pilot's last moments of life.

Recoil again picked a diverse set guest vocalists – internationally acclaimed (and fellow Mute artist) Diamanda Galás, 1940s gospel singers the Golden Gate Jubilee Quartet, New York spoken word performers Nicole Blackman and Samantha Coerbell, and Catalan narrator (and Recoil fan) Rosa Torras. Additional musicians utilized were Curve's Dean Garcia (bass) and Steve Monti (drums), Ian Dury and the Blockheads' Merlin Rhys-Jones (guitar), and Miranda Sex Garden's Hepzibah Sessa (violin).

Of note is the track "Jezebel", which features the Golden Gate Jubilee Quartet. There is some debate that it was inspired by the Moby album Play (released a year prior to Liquid) and its use of Alan Lomax field recordings. However, a similar track appears on Recoil's 1992 Bloodline album, "Electro Blues for Bukka White", dispelling this idea. Furthermore, Moby appeared on the Bloodline album.

Nine Inch Nails played the Liquid album before taking the stage during their Fragility tour in 2000.

== Track listing ==
All music written by Alan Wilder

1. "Black Box, Part 1" (Words: Alan Wilder)
2. "Want" (Words: Nicole Blackman)
3. "Jezebel" (Words: Traditional/Orlandus Wilson)
4. "Breath Control" (Words: Nicole Blackman)
5. "Last Call for Liquid Courage" (Words: Samantha Coerbell)
6. "Strange Hours" (Words: Diamanda Galás)
7. "Vertigen" (Words: Rosa M. Torras)
8. "Supreme" (Words: Coerbell)
9. "Chrome" (Words: Nicole Blackman)
10. "Black Box, Part 2" (Words: Alan Wilder)

== Credits and personnel ==
- Alan Wilder – all music and production
- Paul Kendall – additional production and sound design
- Reto Bühler – narration on "Black Box, Part 1" and "Black Box, Part 2"
- Nicole Blackman – lead vocals on "Want", "Breath Control", and "Chrome"
- Golden Gate Jubilee Quartet – lead vocals on "Jezebel"
- Samantha Coerbell – lead vocals on "Last Call for Liquid Courage", "Supreme" and "New York Nights"
- Diamanda Galás – lead vocals on "Strange Hours", additional vocals on "Jezebel" and "Vertigen"
- Rosa M. Torras – lead vocals on "Vertigen", background vocals on "Black Box" (Complete)
- Sonya Madan – lead vocals on "Don't Look Back"
- Dean Garcia – additional bass and guitar
- Steven Monti – drum sources
- Merlin Rhys-Jones – guitar sources
- Hepzibah Sessa – violin and backing vocals
- Lee Funnell – photography
- Michael Williams at Intro – art direction/design

== Singles ==
=== "Strange Hours" ===
==== CD: Mute / CD MUTE 232 (UK) ====
1. "Strange Hours" (Radio Edit, by Wilder)
2. "Jezebel" (Filthy Dog Mix, by Wilder)
3. "New York Nights" (also credited as "Manhattan". Non-album track; Music: Wilder, Words: Samantha Coerbell)
4. "Don't Look Back" (Non-album track; Music: Wilder, Words: Sonya Madan)
5. "Strange Hours" (Video)
6. "Drifting" (Video, from the album Unsound Methods)
7. "Stalker" (Video, from Unsound Methods)
8. "Faith Healer" (Video, from the album Bloodline)

=== "Jezebel" ===
==== CD: Mute / CD MUTE 233 (UK) ====
1. "Jezebel" (Radio Edit)
2. "Jezebel" (The Slick Sixty vs. RJ remix)
3. "Electro Blues for Bukka White" (2000 Version; Music: Wilder, Words: Bukka White)
4. "Black Box" (Complete)
5. "Jezebel" (Video)
