= Hydrology (album) =

Studio album by Recoil
- Released: January 25, 1988
- Genre: Electronica
- Length: 37:18
- Label: Mute – STUMM 51
- Producer: Alan Wilder

Recoil chronology
1 + 2 (1986)	Hydrology (1988)	Bloodline (1992)

Alternative cover
- Hydrology Plus 1 + 2 CD album

Professional ratings
Review scores
Source	Rating
AllMusic	4/5 stars

Hydrology is the second album by Recoil, released January 25, 1988. It was Alan Wilder's second Recoil release. The CD and cassette version included the first release, 1 + 2.

Wilder was unable to promote his new album because of the onset of Depeche Mode's Music for the Masses tour. Wilder described the project at this stage as "an antidote to Depeche Mode in some ways; a way to alleviate the frustrations of always working within a pop format."

== Re-release ==
The CD of Hydrology Plus 1 + 2 was re-released in 2007, again on Mute Records. The track listing and artwork remain the same.

== Track listing ==
All music written by Alan Wilder

1. "Grain" – 7:44
2. "Stone" – 14:32
3. "The Sermon" – 15:03

== Credits and personnel ==
- Alan Wilder – production, instruments
- T + CP Associates – sleeve photography and design
