= Alan Wilder =

English musician and composer (born 1959)

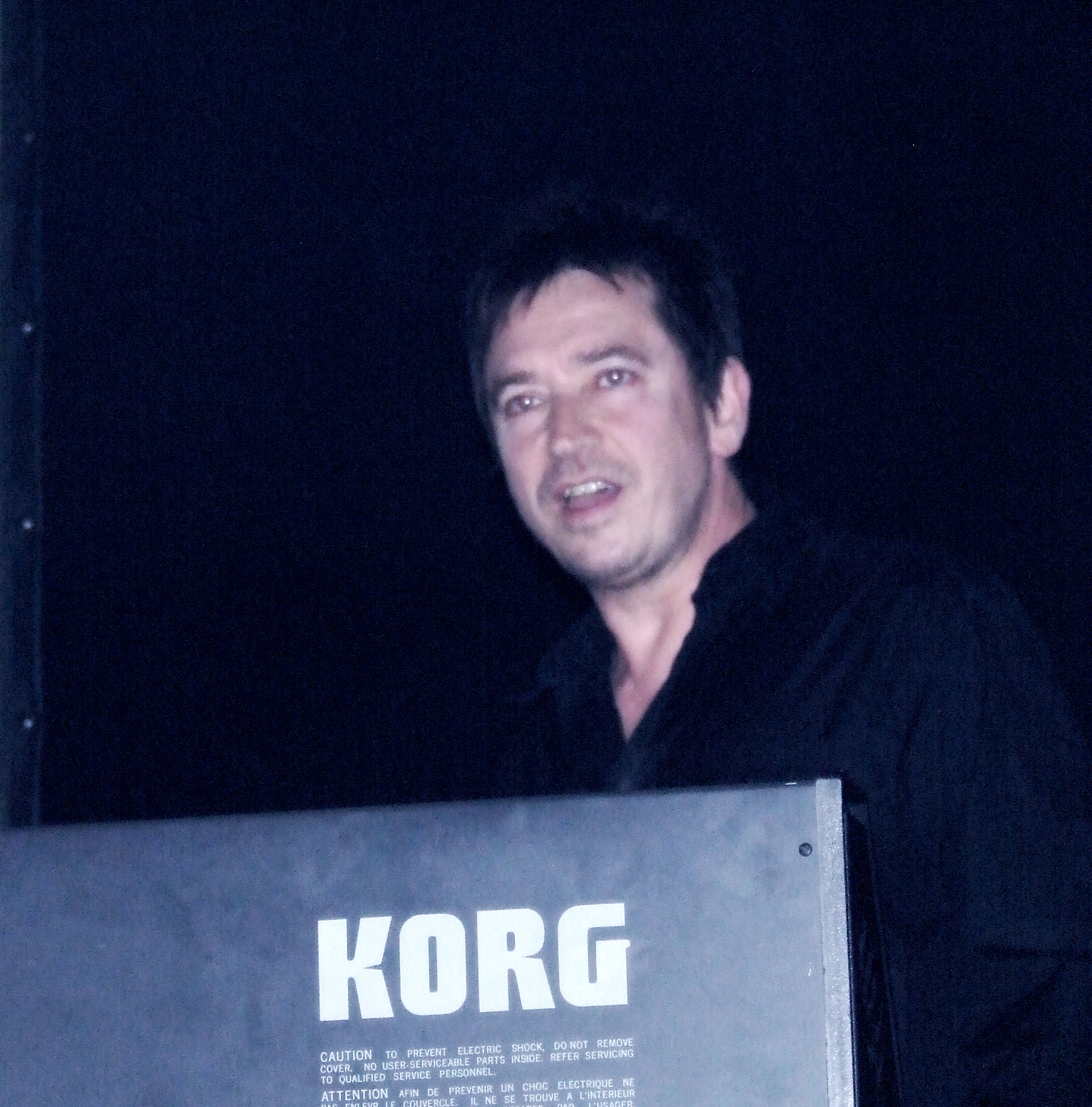
- Wilder performing in 2010

Background information
- Born: Alan Charles Wilder; 1 June 1959 (age 67); Hammersmith, London, England
- Genres: Synth-pop; new wave; electronic rock; electronic
- Occupations: Musician; composer; arranger; record producer
- Instruments: Keyboards; sampler; drums; percussion; flute; guitar; bass guitar; vocals
- Years active: 1975–present
- Labels: Mute; Reprise; Warner Bros.
- Member of: Recoil
- Formerly of: The Hitmen; Depeche Mode
- Website: recoil.co.uk

Alan Charles Wilder (born 1 June 1959) is an English musician, composer, arranger, and record producer. A classically trained musician, Wilder was a member of the English electronic band Depeche Mode from 1982 to 1995. After his departure from Depeche Mode, the musical project Recoil—which began as a side project in 1986—became Wilder's primary musical enterprise. Wilder has also provided production and remixing services to the bands Nitzer Ebb and Curve. In 2020, Wilder was inducted into the Rock and Roll Hall of Fame as a member of Depeche Mode.

== Early life and musical career ==
Alan Charles Wilder was born in Hammersmith, west London, on 1 June 1959 to Albert and Kathleen Wilder, the youngest of their three sons. Born into a middle-class English family, Wilder was musically gifted as a child, and was trained as a classical musician who was able to play flute, brass instruments and piano, the latter of which he received top marks for in his early schooling. However, he was largely uninterested in school, dropping out of university after one year. Influenced by rock and pop music acts such as David Bowie and Marc Bolan, Wilder wanted to work in the music industry, applying for jobs at recording studios, for which he was "rejected about forty times." He finally got a job as a tape op at DJM Studios in London, where he learned about studio equipment and grew his desire to be a musician. Wilder's role was the lowest rung of employees at the studio, with Wilder later calling his role "a tea boy, really - an overworked gofer", but later acknowledge how much it helped him learn, saying "I would get your training from real experience in a commercial studio, rather than trying to learn in a classroom. Working in the area of music entails so much more than simply twiddling knobs and knowing how to mic up a band. You'll have to start at the bottom — making the tea and being abused by producers, but you'll learn so much more than you would at any school." Wilder said that he "was great at the more musical aspects of studio work, such as tape editing, drop—ins, etc., but useless when it came to the [technical aspects of setting up studio equipment]". When bands would leave the studio for the day, they often left their equipment, which allowed Wilder to practice playing keyboards and drums and hone his skills.

For a few years, Wilder joined rock, reggae and pop bands including The Dragons, Real to Real, The Hitmen and Dafne and the Tenderspots, the latter of which he joined under the stage name "Alan Normal", but none of the bands lasted for long. It was just after The Hitmen had split in late 1981 that Wilder spotted an ad in the music magazine Melody Maker for a band that was looking for a keyboardist.

== Depeche Mode (1982–1995) ==
=== Joining as a touring musician ===
Following the departure of founding member Vince Clarke, the remaining members of Depeche Mode realized that their heavy tour commitments would necessitate finding a musician to help play on tour, so the band put an advertisement in Melody Maker stating "Synth / Vocals needed for electronic pop group with UK & International commitments – must be under 21." Wilder was initially vetted by Mute Records label owner and producer Daniel Miller, who allowed Wilder to audition in front of the band, which occurred at Blackwing Studios in London. Miller called Wilder "technically and musically very adept ... he could play everything they requested with one hand tied behind his back." At their first meeting, Wilder was struck by the "rudimentary" level of the band's musical skills. Band member Andrew Fletcher had said in an interview the previous year, "None of us play piano. ... You'd have to go into it seriously, and we haven't got the time." Wilder found their initial meeting hard, as he came from a middle-class family, and the rest of the band came from working-class backgrounds. Wilder also later admitted that, while he didn't know much about electronic music when he auditioned, he knew who Depeche Mode were before he decided to go and try out for the part.

The band had auditioned many potential keyboardists before hearing Wilder; Gahan remembered later that "we auditioned [potential replacements] at Blackwing, and all these strange and wonderful characters showed up. And they were all dressed up to the nines, but couldn't play. And Alan [Wilder] came along and could play anything."

Wilder's ability to play along with the rest of the band easily, as well as his non-deferential treatment to the band, earned Wilder the spot with the band, despite being 22 years old. As Wilder was on unemployment benefits and was without work at the time, he was happy to join.

Initially hired as a touring musician and paid a weekly wage, Wilder's first show with Depeche Mode was a warm-up gig at Croc's in Rayleigh, England, on 20 January 1982. His addition to the band was reported in Smash Hits as being a 'trial period', with his potential to join the band later uncertain. Wilder played on Depeche Mode's See You Tour, with shows in the UK, Europe and the US, which ran from January to May 1982. In a later interview, Wilder said that "I wanted to always be a musician, and I always had a conviction about being a musician, I didn't want to do anything else ... but at the time I didn't see it [being in Depeche Mode] as a long term thing. It evolved into something I became more and more interested in." Looking back on his early days with the band, Wilder said that

"They were a very tight unit, somewhat self-deprecating and lacking in confidence. All the musicians I had been involved with prior to this had exuded self-belief, while enjoying little or no success. I'd never met a group like this one, and it made me wonder how they had come so far in such a short time. Then I realised how much of an influence Daniel Miller had over them. As I got to know them, it became clear that it was actually Vince Clarke and Daniel who had been the driving forces up to that point. Daniel was extremely protective of the group, and I found him a difficult person to get to know. With the others, they were friendly enough, but I must admit to feeling like an outsider. Differences in our backgrounds were never far from the surface."

=== 1982: A Broken Frame ===
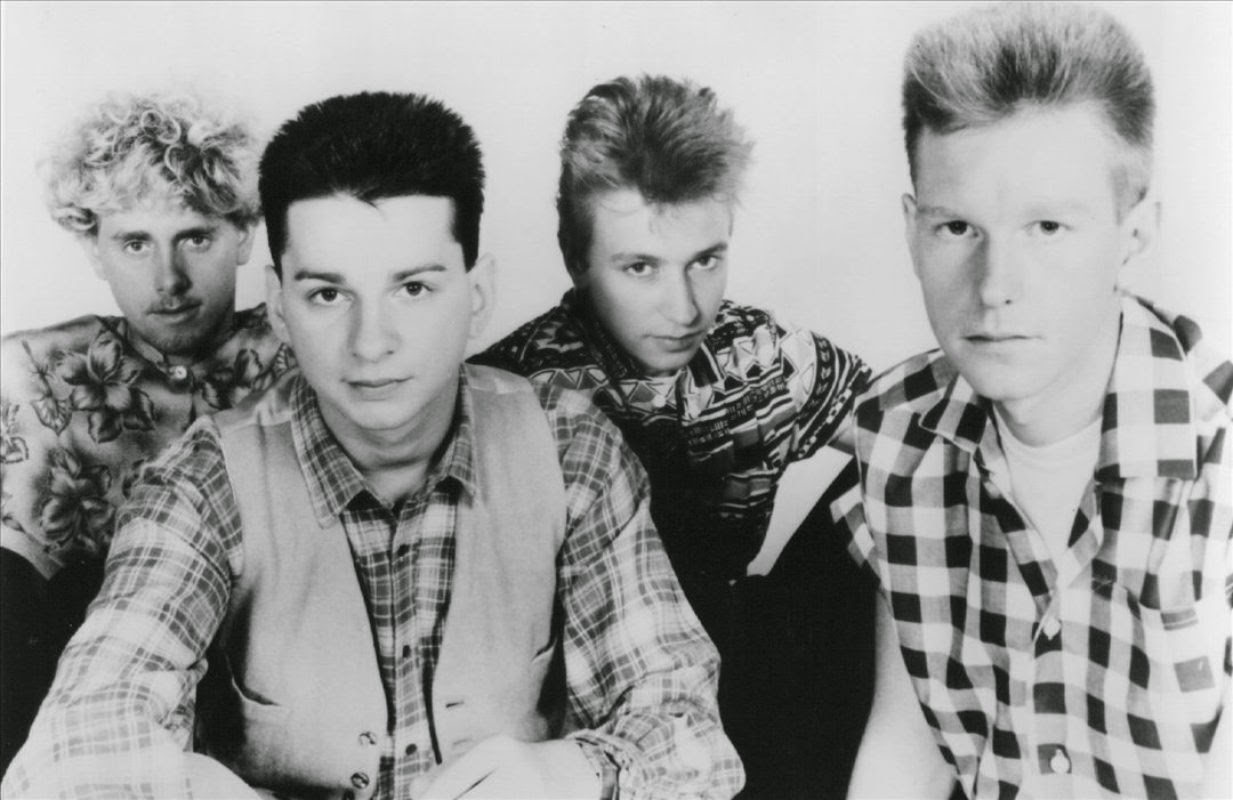
Depeche Mode in 1982; Wilder on the centre-right.

In July 1982, the band, without Wilder, went into the studio in London to record their second album, A Broken Frame, which was released in September 1982. As a way of explaining Wilder's exclusion from the sessions, Fletcher said in contemporary interviews that "at the moment he [Wilder] is a live session man. He just plays live for us, not in the studio, but that might change."

After the release of the album, the band, with Wilder, supported it with the A Broken Frame Tour, which ran from October 1982 through May 1983 with shows in the UK, Europe, the US and Asia. It was during the UK leg of the tour, in October 1982, that Wilder was officially inducted into the band. His induction was without fanfare; producer Daniel Miller simply phoned Wilder to let him know that he was an official member of the band. Said songwriter and original member Martin Gore, "after Vince [Clarke] left and went to form Yazoo, we were getting ready to record a new album. Alan [Wilder] started playing with us, but we wanted to make certain that any change in direction in our music wasn't attributable to Alan joining. We needed to show we were capable of musical alteration by ourselves. So we recorded A Broken Frame with that in mind, although Alan will be playing on our tours when we perform songs from the album. Now we feel free for him to be a full time recording member of the group now that the change in pattern has been established!"

In mid-November, while still on tour but on a break between the UK and European legs, the band, now including Wilder, went back to the studio to record a new song, "Get the Balance Right!". The song was released as a non-album single in January 1983, before the US and Asian legs of the tour. Wilder co-wrote the single's b-side, "The Great Outdoors!", for the single with Gore. Wilder was also responsible for creating the 12" remix of the "Get the Balance Right!", cutting up tape and re-assembling it by hand to make the remix.

=== 1983: Construction Time Again ===
In early 1983, Depeche Mode went into the studio to record Construction Time Again, the first album in which Wilder was included. Wilder brought both a Synclavier and an Emulator, which allowed the band to capture and manipulate sounds in a way they hadn't been able to prior. Wilder wrote a handful of songs for the album, including "Two Minute Warning", "The Landscape Is Changing", as well as B-sides "Fools" and "Work Hard". Wilder felt that, as this was the first Depeche Mode album he worked on, he should take part in songwriting, although he did not consider it his strong suit, saying, "I felt I should participate in the process. However, it became clear that my strengths were more to do with placement of sounds and the structuring of the music, and I suppose my classical upbringing was a factor in this. What I really added was an enthusiasm and desire to experiment more. I was also desperate for us to be taken more seriously, which meant producing a darker, more weighty sound." He later added that "at one point I did try and persuade Martin [Gore] to co-write because I thought as a team we might be able to write some good songs together, but he completely blanked that idea. He wasn't into it at all."

After releasing the album, the band supported it with the Construction Time Again Tour, which ran from September 1983 through the end of that year, with over a half-dozen one-off shows stretching through mid-1984.

=== 1984: Some Great Reward ===
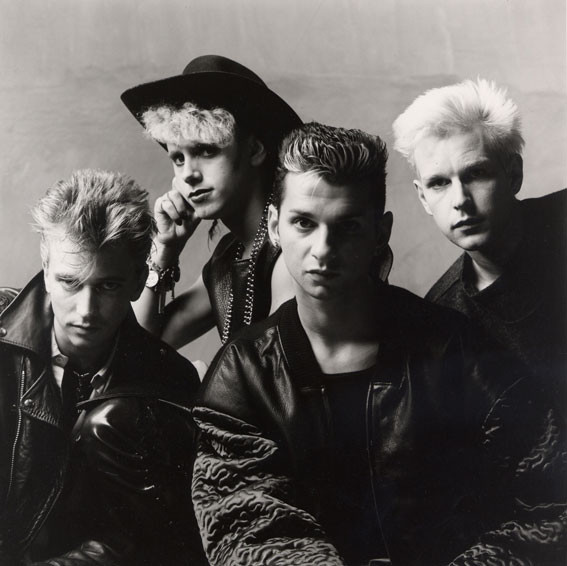
Wilder (left) with Depeche Mode, 1985

1984's Some Great Reward was, according to Gore, a "turning point" for Wilder's role in Depeche Mode, as he started to focus more on the production of the band's songs, and took over a greater role in engineering the band's sound. Wilder wrote "If You Want" for the album, and the B-side track to "People Are People", "In Your Memory". "If You Want" would be the last song Wilder wrote that appeared directly on a Depeche Mode album, although he would write more B-side material for their next album in 1986. After the recording sessions for Some Great Reward were over, the other members of the band went on holiday while they left co-producers Daniel Miller, Gareth Jones and Wilder to finish the production of and mixing of the album. Wilder had held off on arranging his own vacation, saying, "I foresaw the fact that we were going to go over deadline and held off arranging one [holiday] myself because I didn't want to miss out on the whole mixing process." The album was the first time it was noted that the rest of the band would leave the album's arrangement and mixing to Wilder while they would leave, with Gore later saying Wilder would "often sit in the studio with Daniel [Miller] and Gareth [Jones] till two or three in the morning" while the rest of the band was out at a club.

The supporting Some Great Reward Tour ran from September 1984 through July 1985, and saw the band's first shows behind the Iron Curtain.

In 1985, Depeche Mode focused on a singles release instead of a full album; the band recorded two new singles, "It's Called a Heart" and "Shake the Disease", both released in 1985 and included on the compilation albums Catching Up with Depeche Mode (1985; US release) and The Singles 81→85 (1985; UK release).

=== 1986: Black Celebration ===
Depeche Mode's next album, Black Celebration, recorded in late 1985 and early 1986, saw Wilder living with his girlfriend Jeri Young. The album sessions are notable for including Wilder's last writing contributions to the band in the B-sides "Black Day" and "Christmas Island". Starting with this album and going forward, Wilder's more notable contributions to Depeche Mode were as a musician, arranger, and producer. Although Black Celebration saw the whole band credited for its production, it was Wilder who was effectively the third producer for the album alongside Miller and Jones. Years later, Wilder said he stopped songwriting for the band because it didn't come naturally to him, and he struggled with the lyrics, saying "My interest is more about atmosphere and production and editing and all the other things." Black Celebration was released in early 1986 and supported by the Black Celebration tour, which ran from March to August of that year.

Also in 1986, Wilder released 1 + 2, the first album under the name Recoil, a collection of sampled Depeche Mode sounds that he originally didn't intend to make public until Miller persuaded him to turn the project into an album. Said Wilder, it was "an experiment, an improvisation that I had recorded in my home studio using really simple equipment."

=== 1987: Music for the Masses ===
In the second half of 1986, the band met to start work on their next album by meeting at Wilder's home recording studio to listen to the song demos that Gore had prepared. Their early 1987 single "Strangelove" was recorded and released from these early sessions at Wilder's home studio before the rest of the album was recorded.

David Bascombe was hired by the band as a co-producer for their new album, but he took more of an audio engineer role in the studio. Instead, Wilder was described by Bascombe as the person "steering the ship", as he was the one most interested in the process of recording and producing the music. Wilder, as the one with the vision for how the album should sound, said that "It was very important to have a focus for each track. ... Each song, let's have an idea, a theme for how we're going to try and approach this. As a result of Bascombe's engineering influence, Wilder's production style and the use of reverb in the songs, Bascombe and later reviews described the sound of the songs and album overall as "epic" and "orchestral". The recording process was described as 3-step: Gore would write the basic song, then Wilder would perform and arrange the songs on his own at his home studio, and then the band would meet at the studio to record the final versions together. During the sessions for the album, Wilder played most of the piano parts on a grand piano that was found at the studio, with lead singer Dave Gahan later saying "[Wilder] is a fantastic piano player, and I don't think we appreciated it at the time."

The band undertook the Music for the Masses Tour to support the album that ran from October 1987 through June 1988. The final show of the tour, the 101st of the tour, was recorded in the documentary 101, whose name was one that Wilder proposed, named after both the fact that the final show was the 101st of the tour, and the nearby 101 highway. Wilder was the spokesman for the band, announcing the 101st show to the press.

In January 1988, Wilder released his Recoil side project's second album, Hydrology (1988).

=== 1990: Violator ===
The band started recording their follow-up album in early 1989. For the album, the band brought in music producer Mark Ellis, known professionally as Flood. With co-producer Flood, Wilder began a complementary working relationship, with Flood able to provide the technical know-how and Wilder working on the arrangements and song textures. "That's how we made the group work at that time", said Wilder, "by accepting that we all had different roles and not actually all trying to do the same thing. So we ended up with this unwritten agreement in the band, where we'd all throw together a few ideas at the beginning of a track. Then [Gahan and Andy Fletcher and Gore] would go away, and they'd come back after we'd worked on it for a while to give an opinion." In the studio, Wilder and Flood sent the rest of the band away most of the time while they worked on the new material. Said Wilder, "In the earlier years, everybody would be there [in the studio] with the result often being lots of chat and mucking around with little actual work being achieved. As time went on, we all realised that less people in the control room equaled more work done." Miller later suggested that this was the beginning of cracks in the band, with Wilder often irritated at other members of the band, who would wander into the control room with unwanted feedback before wandering off again. Gore later said that Wilder had been a great influence on the band, but "Flood in tandem with Wilder was a great team."

"Enjoy the Silence" was initially written as a ballad by Gore, performed on a Harmonium with just Gore's voice. When he first heard the demo, Wilder said when he heard the lyric "All I ever wanted", he heard it in his head in Neil Tennant's (of the Pet Shop Boys) voice. Said Wilder, "it occurred to me that it [Enjoy the Silence] could work brilliantly as a sort of up-temp dance track. ... I think the others were a little dubious, but after a little bit of persuasion they said, 'Well, why don't you and Flood put together something that you think will be appropriate for this track, and we'll go away and come back when you're ready to play it to us.'" Flood and Wilder spent time putting together the song, and later invited Gore back into the studio to record the guitar riff, after which point, the band realised that they had a hit on their hands. In 2006, the band described the song as "the most successful single in [Depeche Mode's] history."

To support the album, the band embarked on the World Violation Tour, which ran from May to November 1990.

During 1991, Wilder recorded his third Recoil album, Bloodline (1992) and collaborated with the band Nitzer Ebb by remixing a song for their EP As Is (1991) and co-producing their album Ebbhead (1991). In August, Wilder married his long-time girlfriend, Jeri Young.

Also in mid-1991, the Wilder and Gore went back into the studio to record a new track, titled "Death's Door", for Wim Wenders' upcoming new film, Until the End of the World (1991). Of recording the song, Wilder said "Martin [Gore] obviously wrote the song, but the backing track to 'Death's Door' was mostly my work. The guitar parts were sampled, but not from the demo. I reworked Martin's previously recorded guitar from 'Blue Dress' and also used some pedal steel out-takes play by Nils Tuxen, which were recorded direct to DAT when we hired him to perform on 'Clean'. Dave [Gahan] didn't want to come to England to do this track, so I worked on it myself at my home studio and called Martin in to do the vocals later on. It was mixed with Steve Lyon at Konk [studio]."

=== 1993: Songs of Faith and Devotion ===
In early 1992, the band joined together to record their follow-up album, Songs of Faith and Devotion. Wilder said that the band wanted to do something different from their previous album, saying "we needed to push the boundaries a bit, and try and do something completely different to Violator. I'm sure, subconsciously, there was a big pressure to repeat that success, and the obvious thing to do would have been to make a very similar record. None of us really wanted to do that, and I think particularly Flood, Dave [Gahan] and myself wanted to make it as different as we could, and surprise people with it." As a result, according to Wilder, "After some discussion between myself, Flood and the others, we agreed that our approach should be more towards performance whilst trying to push ourselves into areas we hadn't explored. Some of the songs like 'I Feel You', 'In Your Room' and 'Rush' suggested a looser, more 'live' feel and it's probably fair to say that myself, Flood and Dave [Gahan] were the main instigators of this open and fluid sound. This more performance–based style of working threw its own spanner in the works which some of us found hard to come to terms with." Said Wilder, "I suppose the emphasis is much more on performing on this record, but once that performance was created, we applied all the technology we've come to know and love over the years to put it together in a way that's still uniquely Depeche Mode."

Unfortunately, due to the time off since their last full record and tour, Gahan's heroin addiction, Gore's drinking and Fletcher's depression, tensions were high between the band during sessions for Songs of Faith and Devotion. Due to the poor state of the band, an initial six-week recording session in Madrid was largely unusable, which Wilder described as "a complete fucking waste of time" in a sarcastic toast to Flood at the airport on their way back home.

During subsequent recording sessions, Wilder focused on the work, and didn't socialize with the rest of the band outside of the studio in Madrid where early sessions took place. Partly this was due to Gahan's behavior, which was becoming more erratic, including occasions where Gahan would pick fights with people on the street or in bars. Wilder said "[Gahan] caused another incident, totally unprovoked, in a Madrid nightclub by insulting a group of Hells Angels, which resulted in a street brawl." Wilder's creative differences with Gore and poor relationship with Fletcher were the real source of the tension in the band.

By August 1992, the band had relocated to Château du Pape Studio in Hamburg, Germany. Wilder said that the atmosphere within the group was "much better" in Hamburg, since they were working in a "normal" studio environment, and could leave at the end of the day and Fletcher, who had left to seek treatment for his depression, was not in attendance. There were still disagreements, however, with Flood noting that compared to the Violator sessions, the sessions for Songs of Faith and Devotion were more "confrontational", where no decision was made without someone disagreeing. Gore suggested that Fletcher's absence improved Wilder's mood, as the two of them never got along very well: "that's probably why Alan [Wilder] cheered up and started coming out – he was out with us every night!"

The band moved to London to continue recording and mixing at Olympic Studios in late 1992. Wilder also spent time while at Olympic Studios mixing "Walking in My Shoes" for its single release later in 1993. Wilder, Flood and Mark "Spike" Stent completed the final album mix at Olympic Studios in December 1992.

It was during the recording of the album that Wilder realized that he might have to leave the band. Wilder later was comparing the friction between the members of the Beatles during the recording of their 1968 self-titled album to conditions working on Songs of Faith and Devotion: "We were in the worst possible state as members but we were creating some of our best work. The stories I hear about them [The Beatles] not being even in the same room together – that was very much the same with us, when one person would be in the studio and the other would be in another city, and then the next day that person would come and do their vocal and you'd go away, because you couldn't bear to be in the same room. ... at the time, it was a living hell. During the making of that album, I really made a decision to leave the group; even though I didn't leave until two or three years later, I remember thinking 'I'm never going to make another record under these circumstances again, because it's so much not fun'. And music should be fun – there should be some sort of enjoyment there." When asked by the Depeche Mode fan club magazine Bong in early 1992 about whether or not he saw himself still with the band in ten years, he said no.

Songs of Faith and Devotion was released in March 1993.

The band supported the album with the Devotional Tour, which was initially supposed to run only through 1993. Work for the supporting began by Christmas 1992 when Wilder and Lyon started to assemble the backing tracks to be used on tour. Tracks from the first European leg of the tour were also recorded for a live album; during the month-long break between the European and US legs in August 1993, Wilder and Lyon went to Dublin to mix the live album at Windmill Lane Studios while the rest of the band went on holiday. For the first time on a Depeche Mode tour, Wilder played drums live along to some tracks. Relationships between band members were poor during the tour; most of the band took their own limos from hotels to the show and back and did not spend time with each other outside of the shows themselves. Producer and label owner Daniel Miller later said, "It was different limos, different hotel floors. I don't think anyone spoke to Dave [Gahan] the entire tour. They saw Dave on stage and then he went off into his dressing room and his candles and everything. Alan [Wilder] wasn't really talking to Martin [Gore] and [Fletcher]. Obviously it was very sad."

During the tour, Wilder began a relationship with Hepzibah Sessa of the band Miranda Sex Garden, who had opened for the band on some dates during the tour.

On 1 and 2 July 1993, after playing two nights in Paris, Wilder and Lyon went to Studio Guillaume Tell, where they had recorded some of the songs from Music for the Masses years earlier, to remix their single "Condemnation", giving the remix the name "Paris mix".

During the break between the European and North American legs in August 1993, tracks recorded during the European leg for a live album were mixed by Wilder and Lyon, who went to Dublin to mix the live album at Windmill Lane Studios. The resulting live album, Songs of Faith and Devotion Live, was released in December 1993.

Most of the band took January 1994 off for a holiday, except Wilder, who worked out changes to the tour's setlist for the upcoming leg in Milan. Only Wilder, Lyon and Daryl Bamonte worked on the updated songs. Said Wilder, "The remaining members of the band didn't hear [the new songs or their arrangements] until [they were] played on stage."

In early February, when the tour was in South Africa, Wilder had some of his luggage stolen, despite being locked in secure storage that was patrolled by guards. Said Wilder, "We concluded that it must have been an inside job. ... I lost about £10,000 worth of clothing, some very personal bits and pieces and, of course, most of my stage outfits, which had to be remade."

The 22 February 1994 show in Durban had to be cancelled after Wilder was hospitalized on 21 February with kidney stones.

Once the tour resumed, Fletcher's depression started to drive a wedge further between him and Gahan and Wilder, who were both enjoying the hard-partying atmosphere of the tour. Said Gore, "It was very difficult. [Fletcher] has been my closest friend since we were 12. But for the other two, he'd become unbearable." As a result of Fletcher's depression and anxiety, and the dysfunction within the band, Fletcher made the decision to pull out of the tour after the shows in Honolulu on 25 and 26 March 1994. As he left, Fletcher reportedly told Miller that he would not tour again so long as Wilder remained in the band. During the week break after the shows after Fletcher left, the band enlisted Bamonte to take Fletcher's place on stage. While Gahan and Gore partied on the beaches, Wilder spent a week with Bamonte teaching him how to play the parts for the tour. Wilder later said that Bamonte "subsequently played it perfectly for the rest of the tour – pretty good, considering he'd hardly ever played a keyboard before in his life."

Wilder would later say that his memories of the album and tour were "very dark", adding "I think something broke in me, during the making of that. ... It's perverse, because the music moves me more than anything else we've ever done." After the tour completed, Wilder left his wife Jeri Young, whom he had married in 1991, for Sessa. Wilder was still not sure if he would stay in the band, saying later that "I took some time out after the tour [in late 1994] to be absolutely sure that I was thinking clearly. And I told myself that if I felt the same in six months' time or as with the last album, then I should stop."

=== 1995: Departure ===
By early 1995, Wilder had come to a decision to leave the band. Citing frustration with the band, the process of creating the album, and unequal workload, Wilder reached out to Gore, Fletcher and Gahan to let them know his decision. He met with Gore and Fletcher in London to deliver the news in person. Of all the members, Wilder was closest to Gahan, but was unable to reach him due to Gahan's addiction. After trying to reach him over the phone, in the end he could only send a fax to Gahan saying roughly "Look, I've tried to call you, Dave. I can't get a hold of you. I've just had a meeting with the others to say I've left the group. Good luck."

On 1 June 1995, Wilder officially announced his departure from Depeche Mode, saying

"Due to increasing dissatisfaction with the internal relations and working practices of the group, it is with some sadness that I have decided to part company from Depeche Mode. ... I have continually striven to give total energy, enthusiasm and commitment to the furthering of the group's success and in spite of a consistent imbalance in the distribution of the workload ... this level of input never received the respect and acknowledgement that it warrants. ... Suffice to say that relations have become seriously strained, increasingly frustrating and, ultimately, in certain situations, intolerable. ... The remaining band members have my support and best wishes for anything they may pursue in the future."

Gore later said,

"We always spoke openly about the fact that Andy [Fletcher] wasn't particularly musical – during live shows, we gave him certain parts to play that weren't too taxing. (Note: In a Depeche Mode look-alike competition around 1993 hosted by KROQ-FM, the sole entrant as Fletcher won the contest when he "just stood there, then took a step to the side and did a big off–the–beat clap, and then stepped back. He may have also pretended to hit a keyboard with one finger.") Around this time, Alan had a very large share in what made Depeche Mode, both in its production and preparations. I think he thought it was wrong that he earned exactly the same as Andy, who did practically nothing in the studio."

Miller understood Wilder's decision, saying "I've always thought [Wilder] was underrated by the others. Or rather, Dave valued what he did. Fletch played down what he did and Martin was just off in his world and really didn't think about it. It wasn't just the musical element. Alan was the one who took the trouble to check things and listen to the cuts. He looked at the artwork, and so on. He took a lot of interest in all the aspects of [the band and its business]."

After his split from the band, Wilder was approached by Robert Smith with an offer to join the Cure. According to Wilder himself, the possibility was offered on behalf of the Cure by Bamonte, and Wilder declined as joining another band was the last thing on his mind.

Wilder briefly reunited with Depeche Mode during the Teenage Cancer Trust concert at the Royal Albert Hall in London on 17 February 2010. During the encore, Wilder played piano on "Somebody".

== Recoil (1986–2012) ==
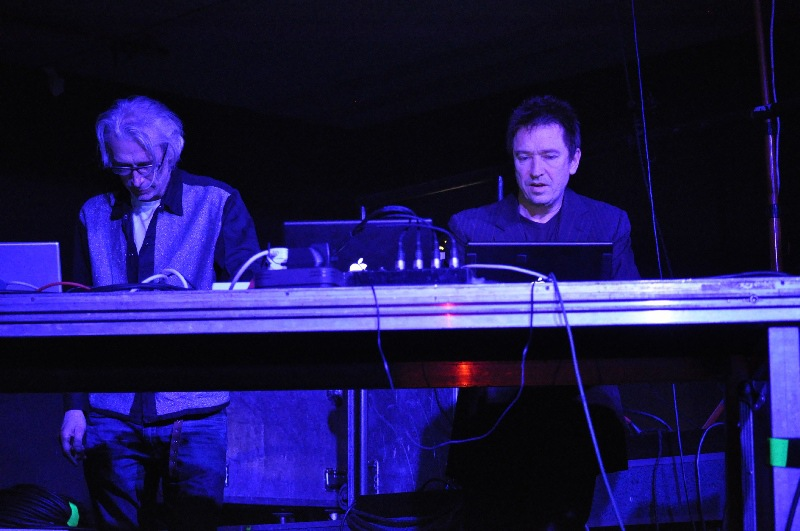
Wilder (right) performing in 2010

Recoil was a musical project created by Wilder. Recoil began whilst Wilder was still in Depeche Mode as an outlet for his experimental, less pop-oriented compositions. Once he announced his departure from the group in 1995, Recoil became Wilder's primary musical enterprise.

Recoil began in 1986 by releasing a two-track experimental EP. Simply entitled 1 + 2, the collection of primitive demos caught the attention of Mute Records label boss Daniel Miller and was inconspicuously released as a mini-album on 12" vinyl. An album, Hydrology, soon followed in 1988, and both were eventually re-issued by Mute on CD as Hydrology plus 1 + 2.

Douglas McCarthy of Nitzer Ebb sang on Recoil's next album, Bloodline, released in 1992. Wilder recruited guest vocalists for the first time, with further contributions from Toni Halliday and Moby. Bloodline also yielded the first Recoil single, a cover of Alex Harvey's song "Faith Healer".

In September 1996, after leaving Depeche Mode, Wilder began work in his own studio, The Thin Line. He pieced together what would become Recoil's next album, Unsound Methods (1997). The album was followed by Liquid (2000), SubHuman (2007), and Selected (2010).

Recoil returned in 2012 to release the concert film A Strange Hour in Budapest on Blu-ray.

== Personal life ==
In August 1991, after marrying his first wife, Jeri Young, Wilder bought a 30-acre, eight-bedroom country estate in Itchingfield, West Sussex, England, where he later built his personal recording studio, The Thin Line.

In 1993, while on the Devotional Tour, Wilder started a relationship with Hepzibah Sessa of Miranda Sex Garden, who opened for the band during the first leg of the tour; after the completion of the tour in 1994, Wilder divorced Young for Sessa. During a road trip holiday in Scotland on 1 September 1994, Wilder and Sessa witnessed the crash of an RAF Panavia Tornado airplane, in which both pilots were killed. Said Wilder in an interview to Melody Maker later,

As I approached a sharp bend in the road, the sound of the Tornado appeared behind me, and as I looked up, I saw the underside of the aircraft not more than 50 feet above me. Within a split second, to my complete astonishment, the plane had crashed beside the road into the glen about 200 yards ahead. Apparently, it had been travelling at nearly 400mph. ... I heard the sound of the impact and witnessed an enormous explosion from which the smoke and debris almost engulfed [us]. ... At the same time, particles of carbon, etc., began to rain down on the open-top car. Beyond the bend, parts of the dead airmen's bodies were clearly visible in the road ... I realised what an incredible escape I'd had. I would surely have been killed or, worse, severely maimed, had I been 10 seconds further into my journey.

Wilder married Sessa in 1995 and they divorced in 2010.

In 2024, Wilder listed his Itchingfield property (minus the studio) for sale, citing the desire to downsize. In May 2024, he purchased a holiday property in Vestfold, Norway.

== Discography ==
=== With Depeche Mode ===
Wilder appeared on all of Depeche Mode's releases from "Get the Balance Right!" (31 January 1983) up to "In Your Room" (10 January 1994), later taking part in reissues and compilations containing material from his time in the band.

==== Depeche Mode songs composed by Alan Wilder ====
- "The Great Outdoors!" (single "Get the Balance Right!", 1983 – co-written with Martin Gore)
- "Work Hard" (single "Everything Counts", 1983 – co-written with Martin Gore)
- "Two Minute Warning" (album Construction Time Again, 1983)
- "The Landscape Is Changing" (album Construction Time Again, 1983)
- "Fools" (single "Love, in Itself", 1983)
- "In Your Memory" (single "People Are People", 1984)
- "If You Want" (album Some Great Reward, 1984)
- "Black Day" (single "Stripped" and album Black Celebration, 1986 – co-written with Martin Gore and Daniel Miller)
- "Christmas Island" (single "A Question of Lust", 1986 – co-written with Martin Gore)

=== Covers and collaborations ===
- 1991 – Mixed the Nitzer Ebb song "Come Alive" from the As Is EP.
- 1991 – Along with Flood, produced the Nitzer Ebb album Ebbhead.
- 2001 – Provided strings and ambient sounds for the song "Polaroid" from the Curve album Gift.
- 2003 – Provided strings and sounds for The Digital Intervention track "Coma Idyllique" from the album Capture. 'PK', a longtime Recoil collaborator is one of its members, along with Olivia Louvel.
- 2012 – Covered two tracks: "Inheritance" – Recoil (ft. Linton Kwesi Johnson & Paul Marshall) and "Dum Dum Girl" – Recoil (ft. Shara Worden) for a Talk Talk tribute album (double) CD/book set called Spirit of Talk Talk. He was also executive music producer for the album.
- 2016 – Provided music and arrangements for "Calling the Clock" by Dede (featuring Alan Wilder).

=== Remixes ===
- 1989: Toni Halliday – "Time Turns Around" (Euro-Tech Version)
- 1991: Nitzer Ebb – "I Give to You" (Wilder Mix Full Version)
- 2010: Nitzer Ebb – "I Am Undone" (Alan Wilder Remix)
- 2011: Depeche Mode – "In Chains" (Alan Wilder Remix)
- 2011: Sonoio – "Minutes" (Expansion Mix)
