= Douglas McCarthy =

English singer (1966–2025)

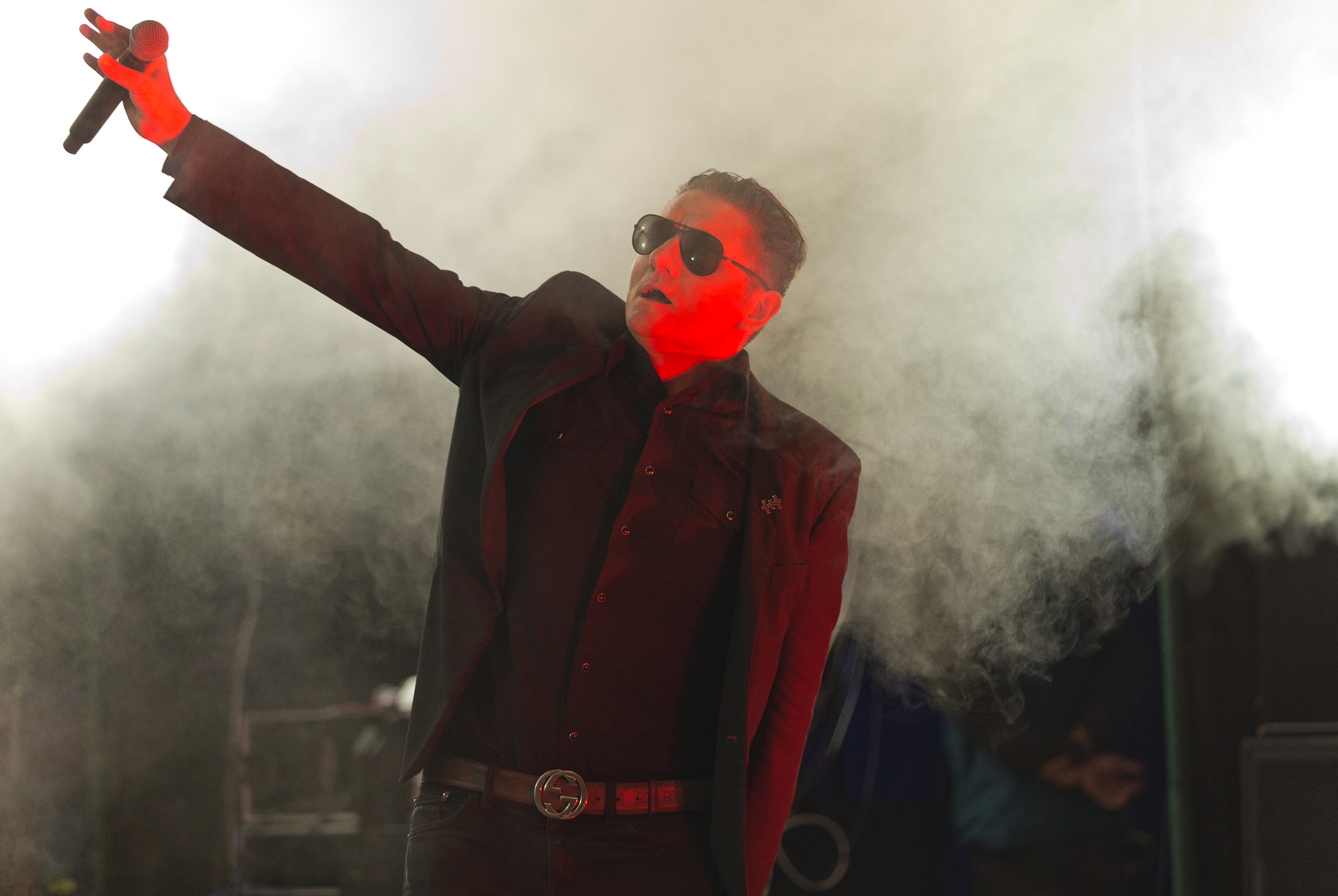
- McCarthy performing in 2016

Background information
- Born: 1 September 1966; Barking, London, England
- Origin: Chelmsford, Essex, England
- Died: 11 June 2025 (aged 58)
- Genres: EBM; techno; industrial
- Occupations: Vocalist; songwriter
- Years active: 1982–2024
- Formerly of: Nitzer Ebb
- Website: douglasjmccarthy.com

Douglas John McCarthy (1 September 1966 – 11 June 2025) was an English singer whose work covers a range of electronic music genres. He was the lead singer of the EBM band Nitzer Ebb from 1982 until 2024. Outside of Nitzer Ebb, he worked with DJ and producer Terence Fixmer as Fixmer/McCarthy, and with musician Cyrusrex as DJM/REX. McCarthy, Cyrusrex, and Nitzer Ebb bandmate Bon Harris formed the music collective Blackline along with such musicians as Paul Barker of Ministry, Mark Walk of Skinny Puppy, and Depeche Mode touring musician Christian Eigner. He released the solo album Kill Your Friends in 2012.

McCarthy contributed as a guest singer on tracks by Recoil, as well as recordings by Die Krupps, KLOQ, Client, Adult and Kenneth James Gibson's Reverse Commuter project.

== Early life ==
McCarthy was born in Barking, East London, in September 1966, and grew up in the county of Essex, the son of a sheet metal worker. His father exposed him to classical artists such as Elgar, Bach and Strauss, as well as contemporary artists such as Tony Bennett, Ella Fitzgerald, Sarah Vaughan and Frank Sinatra.

McCarthy met future Nitzer Ebb drummer David Gooday at ten years of age while skateboarding in Chelmsford, and met the band's keyboardist, Bon Harris, through Gooday. Harris and Gooday attended the same school as McCarthy, although they were a year older. The young men would attend disco and funk nightclubs, such as Goldmine on Canvey Island, at times sneaking in while underage.

As he got older, McCarthy listened to such artists as Showaddywaddy, Slade and Roxy Music. He also cited Brian Eno, Talking Heads, Deutsch Amerikanische Freundschaft as early musical influences, and Fad Gadget, Siouxsie Sioux and Nick Cave as influences on his performance style as Nitzer Ebb's frontman.

== Nitzer Ebb ==
McCarthy, Harris and Gooday founded Nitzer Ebb in 1982 and held their first musical performance at the Chelmsford YMCA. The band was signed to Mute Records in the UK, and Geffen Records in the U.S., and released their first studio album That Total Age in 1987. They opened for Depeche Mode during the European leg of their Music For The Masses tour and joined the European and North American legs of their World Violation Tour, further exposing Nitzer Ebb to an international audience.

McCarthy was responsible for most of the band's lyrics. His performance style, particularly in the early years of Nitzer Ebb, frequently involved repetitive chants and energetic live performances.

Mike Boehm of the Los Angeles Times described a 1989 Nitzer Ebb performance as an "interesting show, thanks largely to McCarthy's athletic, pumped-up performing style and the punk-influenced fervor of his yowling. With short, tousled hair, angular looks and jerk-to-the-beat movements, he resembled Mark Mothersbaugh of Devo, minus Mothersbaugh's way of sweetening technological music with pop hooks." In a review of a 1992 Nitzer Ebb performance, New York Times journalist Jon Pareles wrote: "[Nitzer Ebb's] songs rant about hopelessness or explore dark impulses, with chants that are just barely melodic above dank grids of electronic sound," and added, "when Mr. McCarthy sings a melodic line, he dips into a baritone register that echoes Jim Morrison. But more than most of Morrison's descendants, he seems immune to pretensions of Romantic poetry; he stares at brutal, murderous impulses without the buffer of flowery metaphor. And as he rants, he offers catharsis to an audience eager to slam its frustrations away."

In a 2018 PopMatters article, Hans Rollman wrote: "To watch one of Nitzer Ebb's early videos—"Murderous", say, or "Join in the Chant"—is to be left breathless at the angry passion and sheer physicality of the energy expressed on the camera. Ironically, McCarthy explains, the frenzied body movements and violent passion expressed by the band, and especially by McCarthy himself, was a reaction against the stage fright he felt when they first began performing. He was only 15 at the time."

Subsequent to the band's 1995 album, Big Hit, Nitzer Ebb disbanded. They reformed in 2006, released two more albums, and continued to tour into the 2024, before McCarthy had to take a break due to health reasons.

== Collaborations and solo work ==
In 1992, McCarthy worked with Alan Wilder of Depeche Mode on his then side-project, Recoil, providing the vocals for "Faith Healer", the first single on Recoil's third album Bloodline. McCarthy also worked with Recoil on the follow-up album Unsound Methods (1997), performing on the tracks "Incubus" and "Stalker".

McCarthy collaborated with French techno producer Terence Fixmer under the name Fixmer/McCarthy. The pair were introduced by producer Seth Hodder at Novamute Records, who had previously done work with Nitzer Ebb. Fixmer/McCarthy's debut album Between The Devil, was released in 2004. The duo released the album Into The Night in 2008, and Selected Works—a compilation of unreleased tracks created from 2003 to 2016—in 2016. They also released the standalone singles "So Many Lies", "Chemicals" and "Let it Begin" between 2016 and 2019.

In 2012, he released his first solo album, Kill Your Friends, as Douglas J. McCarthy, on Los Angeles–based label Pylon Records. In a review of the album, Luke Turner of The Quietus said: "McCarthy and his producer, DJ Mark Bell, have taken his voice – estuarine, sneering, threatening, seductive – to interesting new places."

McCarthy provided vocals on the 2013 EP Noise by Swiss DJ and producer Headman (alias of DJ and producer Robi Insinna) and also collaborated with LA-based musician Cyrus Rex under the moniker DJM/REX. In 2013, DJM/REX opened for Depeche Mode at a performance in France and toured the U.S. with Skinny Puppy in 2014.

== Personal life ==
McCarthy first moved to the U.S. in 1995, initially settling in Los Angeles before moving to Grosse Pointe, Michigan, near Detroit. There, he lived with his second wife, Carrie Martin, who had grown up in Grosse Pointe and whom he had met backstage at St. Andrew's Hall in 1989, while he was still married to his first wife.

McCarthy later returned to England, taking a break from musical performance. He lived in Cambridge while studying design and film, and worked for a time in advertising, before returning to the U.S. and settling in Los Angeles, where he lived with his third wife, filmmaker Hazel Hill McCarthy III.

Born with "very politically aware parents", McCarthy identified himself with left-wing politics and ideas, which at times seemed to clash with Nitzer Ebb's imagery ("riding boots and jodhpurs, shaved heads and white shirts and braces", as McCarthy recalled).

== Health issues and death ==
McCarthy was hospitalized in 2021 during Nitzer Ebb's U.S. tour, prompting a break from performing. He returned to the stage in 2023, but in 2024 the band announced that he was taking a break from performing due to the effects of cirrhosis "after years of alcohol abuse". McCarthy wrote: "I will not be performing any live shows as Nitzer Ebb, Fixmer/McCarthy, or any other vehicle until such time I can do so safely and stress-free for myself and the amazing people I have around me who continue to stand by my side in full support of getting me better." McCarthy died on 11 June 2025, at the age of 58.

== Discography ==
As solo artist

- Kill Your Friends (2013)

With Nitzer Ebb

With Recoil

- Bloodline (1992)
- Unsound Methods (1997)

As Fixmer/McCarthy

Albums

- Between The Devil (2004)
- Into The Night (2008)

EPs and singles

- Destroy/Freefall (2003)
- And Then Finally (2006)
- So Many Lies (2016)
- Chemicals (2017)
- Let It Begin (2019)

As DJMREX

- EP1 (2013)
- EP2 (2015)

With Black Line

- Treason, Sedition, and Subversive Activities (2017)
- Sedition EP (2019)

=== Other collaborations ===
Release	Year	Collaborator	Comment
Untitled Remix	2007	Client	Vocals on "Suicide Sister"
Too Much History. The Electro Years (Vol. 1)	2008	Die Krupps	Vocals on "Machineries Of Joy"
Move Forward	2008	KLOQ	Co-writer and vocals on "You Never Know", "I Never Said" and "We're Just Physical"
Noise	2013	Headman feat. Scott Fraser	Vocals
Exposure	2014	Reverse Commuter	Vocals on "Whisper In"
Detroit House Guests	2017	ADULT.	Vocals on "We Are A Mirror" and "They're Just Words"
