= Gopher wood =

Biblical hapax and variety of wood

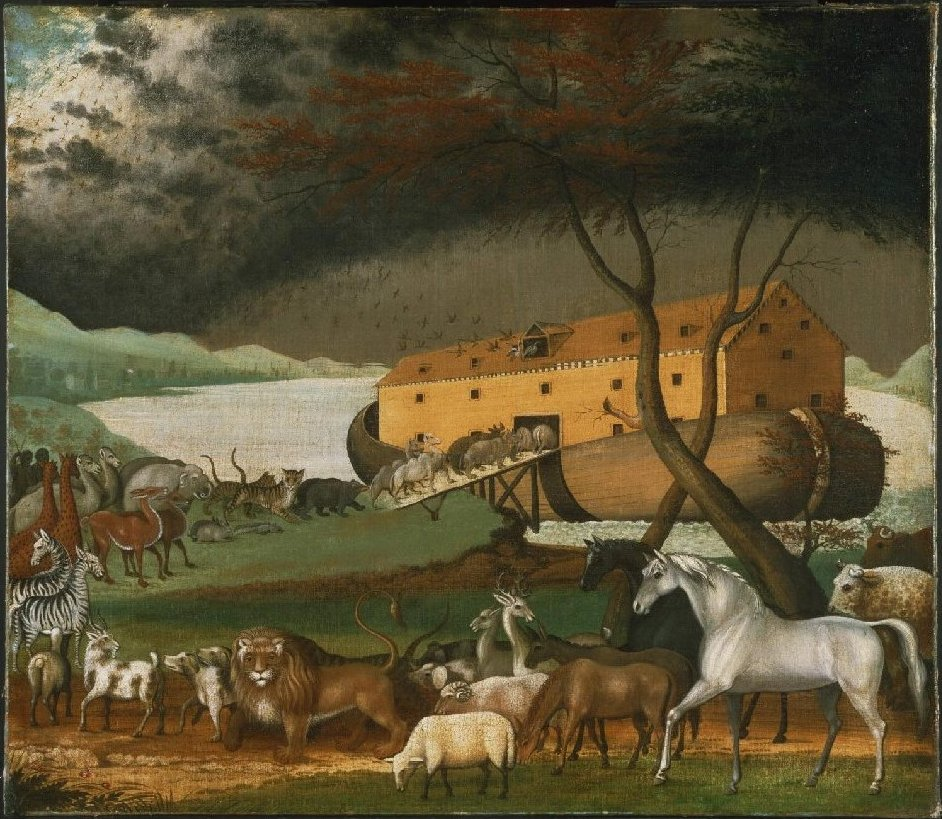
Noah's Ark by Edward Hicks, 1846. Genesis 6:14 says that Noah's Ark was constructed from gopher wood.

Gopher wood or gopherwood is a term used once in the Bible, to describe the material used to construct Noah's Ark. Genesis 6:14 states that Noah was instructed to build the Ark of gofer (גֹפֶר), commonly transliterated as gopher wood, a word not otherwise used in the Bible or the Hebrew language in general (a hapax legomenon). Although some English Bibles attempt a translation, older English translations such as the King James Version (17th century) leave it untranslated. The word is unrelated to the name of the North American animal known as the gopher.

== Identity ==
The Greek Septuagint (3rd–1st centuries BC) translates the phrase as ἐκ ξύλων τετραγώνων (ek xúlōn tetragṓnōn), 'out of squared timber', translating gofer as 'squared'. Similarly, the Latin Vulgate (5th century AD) rendered it as de lignis levigatis (lævigatis, in the spelling of the Clementine Vulgate), 'of timber planks'.

The Jewish Encyclopedia states that it was most likely a translation of the Akkadian term gushure iṣ erini, 'cedar beams', or the Assyrian giparu, 'reeds'. Ancient and modern kuphar boats on the Tigris and Euphrates are also built of reeds, waterproofed with pitch. The Aramaic Targum Onkelos renders this word as qadros, 'cedar'. The Syriac Peshitta translates this word as arqa, 'box' (boxwood).

Many modern English translations favor an identification with cypress. This was espoused (among others) by Adam Clarke, a Methodist theologian famous for his commentary on the Bible: Clarke cited a resemblance between the Greek word for cypress, κυπάρισσος kyparissos, and the Hebrew word gopher. Likewise, the Nova Vulgata (20th century) has it as de lignis cupressinis 'out of cypress wood'.

Others, noting the visual similarity between the Hebrew letters gimel (ג) and kaf (כ), suggest that the word may actually be kopher, the Hebrew word meaning 'pitch': thus kopher wood would be 'pitched wood'. Later suggestions for a dynamic equivalent of the word have included 'laminated wood' (to strengthen the Ark), or a now-lost type of tree, but there is no consensus.
