= Unsound Methods =

Studio album by Recoil
- Released: 27 October 1997
- Recorded: September 1996 – March 1997 at The Thin Line (Sussex, England)
- Genre: Electronica
- Length: 58:58
- Label: Mute – STUMM 159; Reprise/Warner Bros. – 46820
- Producer: Alan Wilder

Recoil chronology
Bloodline (1992)	Unsound Methods (1997)	Liquid (2000)

Professional ratings
Review scores
Source	Rating
AllMusic	4/5 stars
babysue	4/5 stars
NME	3/10 stars

Unsound Methods is the fourth studio album by Recoil, released in 1997. It was recorded at Alan Wilder's home studio, The Thin Line, in Sussex, during sessions that lasted from September 1996 to March 1997. The album was produced by Alan Wilder, with assistance and coordination by Hepzibah Sessa, and additional production and engineering by Steve Lyon. The album was mixed by Wilder (with assistance from Paul Stevens and Simon Shazell).

Unsound Methods was Alan Wilder's fourth Recoil release (after three extended plays), and his first since his departure from his band Depeche Mode in June 1995.

The music was very different from previous Recoil offerings. According to Wilder, "...[T]he sound relates much more to the approach taken on Depeche Mode's Songs of Faith and Devotion LP, which featured and combined lots of snatches of performance (with all their inherent feel). These parts were then sampled and sequenced utilizing all the available technology, to hopefully achieve something more interesting than the sound of a band playing together."

Spoken word artist Maggie Estep, Nitzer Ebb vocalist Douglas McCarthy, Songs of Faith and Devotion back-up singer Hildia Campbell and Siobhan Lynch were all vocalists. The avant-garde electronic duo Pan Sonic from Turku, Finland remixed the song "Shunt".

== Track listing ==
All music written by Alan Wilder

1. "Incubus" (Words: Douglas McCarthy/Francis Ford Coppola (listed as F. Copolla))
2. "Drifting" (Words: Siobhan Lynch)
3. "Luscious Apparatus" (Words: Maggie Estep)
4. "Stalker" (Words: McCarthy)
5. "Red River Cargo" (Words: Thomas A. Dorsey)
6. "Control Freak" (Words: Estep)
7. "Missing Piece" (Words: Lynch)
8. "Last Breath" (Words: Ernest Gold/Pat Boone)
9. "Shunt" (Words: Wilder)

== Credits and personnel ==
- Alan Wilder – All music (except as noted), producer, programmer, mixer, and background vocals on "Missing Piece" and "Shunt"
- Douglas McCarthy – Lead vocals on "Incubus" and "Stalker"
- Siobhan Lynch – Lead vocals on "Drifting" and "Missing Piece", background vocals on "Control Freak" and "Stalker"–Punished Mix
- Maggie Estep – Lead vocals on "Luscious Apparatus" and "Control Freak", background vocals on "Stalker"–Punished Mix
- Hildia Campbell – Lead vocals on "Red River Cargo" and "Last Breath", background vocals on "Incubus" and "Control Freak", (also uncredited background vocals on "Missing Piece–Night Dissolves")
- Hepzibah Sessa – Violin solo on "Missing Piece", talking on "Drifting" and "Last Breath", background vocals on "Incubus", "Control Freak", and "Shunt", assistance and coordination
- Oliver Kraus – Cello on "Stalker" and "Control Freak"
- Steve Lyon – Additional production and programming
- Paul Stevens – Mix assistant
- Simon Shazell – Mix assistant
- Ian Cooper – Metropolis mastering
- House (at Intro) – Sleeve design
- Merton Gauster – Photography
- "Shunt (Pansonic Mix)" remixed by Pan Sonic

== Singles ==
=== "Drifting" ===
==== CD: Mute / CD MUTE 209 (UK) ====
1. "Drifting"–Radio Mix (by Wilder)
2. "Drifting"–Poison Dub (by Wilder)
3. "Control Freak"–Barry Adamson Mix
4. "Shunt"–Pansonic Mix

=== "Stalker/Missing Piece" ===
==== CD: Mute / CD MUTE 214 (UK) ====
1. "Stalker"–Punished Mix (by Alan Wilder and PK)
2. "Missing Piece"–Night Dissolves (by Wilder and PK)
3. "Red River Cargo"–(album version)

== Trivia ==
- Francis Ford Coppola is listed as a co-writer of "Incubus" as the song is filled with quotes from Apocalypse Now. Douglas McCarthy even sounds like Martin Sheen's Capt. Benjamin L. Willard. The album title also comes from a quote from Willard: "They told me that you had gone totally insane, and that your methods were unsound."
- Pat Boone and Ernest Gold are listed as a co-writer of "Last Breath" because an interpolation of their song "Exodus (This Land Is Mine)", from the 1960 film Exodus, is used.
- Hildia Cambell was tapped to sing on the album after joining Depeche Mode as a touring singer during the Devotional Tour. She also sings on the song "Get Right with Me" on the Depeche Mode album Songs of Faith and Devotion.
- Douglas McCarthy is the only collaborator to sing lead vocals on two Recoil albums. He also sang the single "Faith Healer" on the Bloodline album.
- "Red River Cargo" is based on the Thomas A. Dorsey gospel song "Take My Hand, Precious Lord", written in 1932.
- In "Control Freak", there is an interpolation of part of the Ashford & Simpson song "You're All I Need to Get By" (made popular by Marvin Gaye and Tammi Terrell). The words are changed to "You're all I need to get high".
