= Bloodline (Recoil album) =

Studio album by Recoil
- Released: April 14, 1992
- Recorded: January–March 1991 (mixed in October–December 1991)
- Studio: Konk (London)
- Genre: Electronic
- Length: 50:38
- Label: Mute – STUMM 94; Sire; Reprise; Warner Bros. – 26850
- Producer: Alan Wilder

Recoil chronology
Hydrology (1988)	Bloodline (1992)	Unsound Methods (1997)

Professional ratings
Review scores
Source	Rating
AllMusic	3/5 stars

Bloodline is the third album by Recoil, released on April 14, 1992. It was recorded at Konk Studios in London, during sessions that lasted from January to March 1991, being mixed later that same year. The album was produced by Alan Wilder, engineered by Steve Lyon, and assisted by Dave Eringa.

== Background ==
After completing Depeche Mode's most successful album, Violator, and subsequent World Violation Tour (with Nitzer Ebb as the support act), Wilder co-produced Nitzer Ebb's 1991 album Ebbhead. This cemented both a good personal and working relationship with the band's lead singer Douglas McCarthy.

Bloodline was the first Recoil album to feature guest vocalists, with contributions from Moby, Toni Halliday of Curve, and McCarthy. McCarthy's vocals were featured on the album's first single, a cover of the Alex Harvey song "Faith Healer".

The album is also notable for the track "Electro Blues for Bukka White", which introduced the idea of taking very old recordings and setting them in a new electronic setting. Moby, who contributed vocals for the song "Curse", would later release his 1999 breakthrough album, Play, which arguably contains clear stylistic similarities to "Electro Blues for Bukka White". On Play, Moby used several old field recordings by Alan Lomax, much as Wilder had used a 1963 recording of White's "Shake 'Em on Down" on his own "electro blues". The spoken elements in the track are taken from a recording titled "Remembrance of Charley Patton". Both source recordings can currently be found on Bukka White’s Revisited album, released on Fuel 2000 in 2003.

== Track listing ==
All music written by Alan Wilder except "Faith Healer" (Alex Harvey and Hugh McKenna)

1. "Faith Healer" (vocals: Douglas McCarthy)
2. "Electro Blues for Bukka White" (vocals: Bukka White)
3. "The Defector" (instrumental)
4. "Edge to Life" (vocals: Toni Halliday)
5. "Curse" (vocals: Moby)
6. "Bloodline" (vocals: Toni Halliday)
7. "Freeze" (instrumental)

== Credits and personnel ==
- Alan Wilder – production, instruments
- Douglas McCarthy – lead vocals on "Faith Healer"
- Toni Halliday – lead vocals on "Edge to Life" and "Bloodline"
- Moby – rap on "Curse"
- Bukka White – vocals taken from the track "Shake 'Em on Down" and used for "Electro Blues for Bukka White"
- Diamanda Galás – vocals (whispering) on "Curse"
- Jimmy Hughes – bass guitar on "Edge to Life"
- Steve Lyon – engineering
- Aaron Trinder – guitar on "Faith Healer"
- Dave Eringa – engineering assistant
- Martin Atkins, T + CP Associates – sleeve photography and design
- Diamanda Galás contribution is unexplained in the credits, but she is mentioned as appearing on the album. The coda to "Curse" contains a backmasked sample from "The Lord Is My Shepherd" (Psalm 23) from You Must Be Certain of the Devil.
- In the short interlude between "Electro Blues for Bukka White" and "The Defector", there's a piano sample from the end of David Bowie's "Aladdin Sane".
- Samples of Anthony Hopkins' voice from The Silence of the Lambs are used throughout "The Defector".
- In "Edge to Life", the end of Ippolita's monologue from Depeche Mode's Strange can be heard twice.
- An interpretation (or slowed down sample) of "Laura Palmer's Theme" from Twin Peaks is featured in the instrumental interlude in "Bloodline".
- "The Defector" is Wilder's tribute to one of his favorite bands, Kraftwerk.

== Single ==
=== "Faith Healer" ===
==== 7" (MUTE 110) (UK) ====
1. "Faith Healer" (LP version) – mixed by Wilder and Lyon
2. "Faith Healer" (Healed mix) – remixed by LFO

==== 12" and CD (12 MUTE 110 / CD MUTE 110) (UK) ====
1. "Faith Healer" (LP version) – mixed by Wilder and Lyon
2. "Faith Healer" (Trance mix) – mixed by Wilder and Lyon
3. "Faith Healer" (Conspiracy Theory) – remixed by Daniel Miller and Philipp Erb, engineered by Mike Bigwood
4. "Faith Healer" (Disbeliever mix) – remixed by LFO
5. "Faith Healer" (Deformity) – mixed by Wilder and Lyon
6. "Faith Healer" (Barracuda mix) – additional production and mix by Moby (credited as Richard Hall)
7. "Faith Healer" (Conspiracy (Double Bullet) Theory) – remixed by Miller and Erb, engineered by Bigwood
