= Recoil (band) =

Musical project created by English musician Alan Wilder

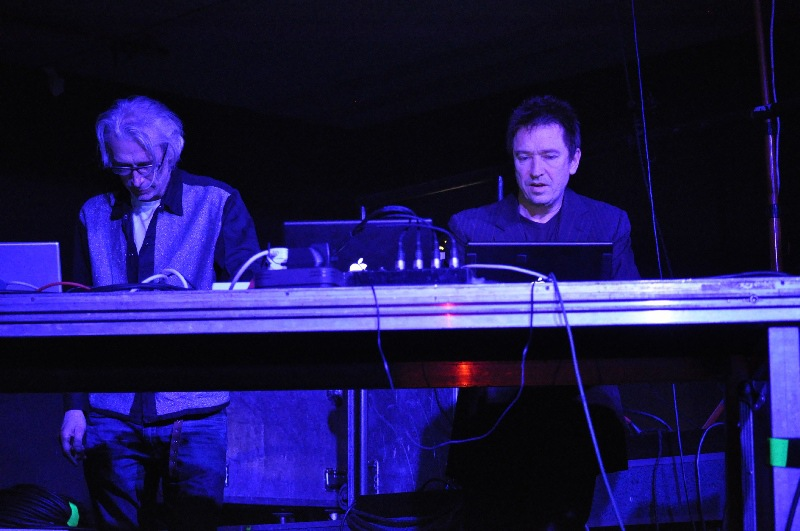
- Paul Kendall (left) and Alan Wilder (right) in 2010

Background information
- Origin: London, England
- Genres: Electronic; trip hop; synth-pop; breakbeat; techno
- Years active: 1986–present
- Labels: Mute; Sire; Reprise/Warner Bros.
- Members: Alan Wilder
- Website: recoil.co.uk

Recoil is a musical project created by English musician and former Depeche Mode member Alan Wilder. Recoil began whilst Wilder was still in Depeche Mode as an outlet for his experimental, less pop-oriented compositions. Once he announced his departure from the group in 1995, Recoil became Wilder's primary musical enterprise.

== History ==
=== 1980s and 1990s ===
Recoil began in 1986, when Daniel Miller (record producer and founder of Mute Records) heard some of Alan Wilder's demo recordings, which he had made on a 4-track cassette Portastudio. These recordings were substantially different from anything Depeche Mode had released—whilst they were still created using synthesizers and sampling, they featured little of Depeche Mode's catchy pop songwriting, instead opting for an experimental, John Cage-esque style. Due to the primitive and decidedly uncommercial nature of these pieces, Wilder and the record label decided to release the album inconspicuously, naming it 1 + 2. It eventually came out in mid-1986, not long after the release of Depeche Mode's well-received Black Celebration.

In January 1988, during the middle of Depeche Mode's hugely successful Music for the Masses tour, Mute released the second Recoil album, Hydrology. This followed in a similar vein to the previous Recoil record, consisting of entirely instrumental, synthesized landscapes. Unfortunately, due to Wilder's busy touring schedule, he was unable to effectively promote the record.

Recoil's first single was from its third album Bloodline, a cover of the Sensational Alex Harvey Band's "Faith Healer", with Douglas McCarthy from Nitzer Ebb on vocals. McCarthy would later reappear for two songs on the next album, Unsound Methods, including the single "Stalker". 1997's Unsound Methods was the first release after Wilder's decision to leave Depeche Mode. The fifth album, Liquid, was released in 2000.

=== 2007–2008: subHuman ===
Although there had been no releases for some time, in 2005 Wilder confirmed that he would start work on a new album. On 20 October 2006, Wilder appeared on a web greeting confirming a Summer 2007 target date for the next Recoil album. On 22 April 2007, Wilder released a statement on his Myspace page that the new album would be entitled subHuman and had been provisionally set for release on 9 July 2007. Included as guest vocalists this time were Carla Trevaskis and Joe Richardson. The latter also delivered the vocals for a track titled "Prey" which was the only single taken from subHuman. A sample from the song was also put on Recoil's MySpace page. "Prey" was released on 27 June 2009 via iTunes and related download portals.

In addition, 2007 saw the re-release of Bloodline (originally released in 1992) and Hydrology plus 1 + 2 (originally released in 1988). iTunes also prepared a special Recoil pack (similar to the Complete Depeche Mode iTunes pack) holding all Recoil releases. It was the first time that all Recoil material was available via iTunes. The packet didn't hold exclusives but did come in a DRM free high quality download version.

A special download-only remix of subHuman track "Killing Ground" by the Slips was released on 1 October 2007 on the Slips' Myspace page. Rumours surfaced that Wilder was to start work on a new album pretty soon. Late 2007, IGN, a unit of Fox Interactive Media, Inc., selected Recoil's subHuman album as "Best Electronic Album" for the year 2007.

In February 2008, Wilder announced, due to popular demand, a limited edition CD release of the double sided Recoil single "Prey"/"Allelujah" out on 25 February 2008. The CD was issued, with the support of Mute, through the Russian label Gala Records in conjunction with depeche-mode.ru and was exclusively available online via their website.

Also in February, the ex-Depeche Mode member released an open letter on the Side-Line magazine website, titled "Music for the Masses – I think not". In the article Wilder handles his vision on today's shifting music market and the position of the artist in this. In the small essay Wilder touches the volume war, the effect of excessive compression, the download spiral, alternative ways to release music, the birth of the fan-powered release of the limited enhanced single "Prey"/"Allelujah" in Russia, Mute Records, Depeche Mode and much more.

December saw a brand new free bonus mix of "Prey" (taken from the subHuman album) released as a Christmas download on 8 December. The mix was approved by Wilder and remixed by David Husser.

=== 2010–2012: Selected ===
In January 2010, Wilder announced a new compilation (Selected) and tour ("Selected Events 2010") on his official Recoil website. With tracks selected by Wilder himself, Selected is a collection of Recoil tracks culled from prior albums. A special bonus disc includes exclusive remixes and alternative versions.

"Selected Events" took Wilder through Europe and North America, spanning from March through May 2010. These shows represented the first live performances ever undertaken by Wilder with the Recoil project. The next part of the tour kicked off with dates across North America, South America and ended in Europe between October & December 2010.

On 17 February 2010, Wilder reunited briefly with former band Depeche Mode live on-stage at the Royal Albert Hall for one song, accompanying Martin Gore for a rendition of the Depeche Mode standard, "Somebody". This was the first time in nearly 16 years that Wilder performed with Depeche Mode, and roughly 15 years since he left the band. The band was playing a charity show, benefiting the Teenage Cancer Trust. According to Wilder, "Dave [Gahan] contacted me a few weeks back and asked if I'd be willing to join them on-stage. He assured me that everyone in the band was into the idea. I was very happy to accept, especially as it was all in a good cause and we were long overdue some kind of reunion of this sort. It was great to see everyone again and catch up a bit, and it was also the first time I have actually 'seen' Depeche Mode perform!"

"Selected Events" continued in 2011, featuring shows in three Baltic countries and appearances at festivals until the end of October.

Also in 2011, Wilder organised with Omega an auction selling a lot of Depeche Mode collectable items on 3 September in Manchester. A DVD called Collected+ was released as promotion for this event.

The Blu-ray only live disc A Strange Hour in Budapest was released in 2012, from the Selected Events from Recoil's tour.

== Discography ==
=== Studio albums ===
- 1 + 2 (18 August 1986 / Stumm 31)
- Hydrology (25 January 1988 / Stumm 51)

1 + 2 and Hydrology were released on CD as Hydrology plus 1 + 2 (1988).

- Bloodline (13 April 1992 / Stumm 94)
- Unsound Methods (27 October 1997 / Stumm 159)
- Liquid (6 March 2000 / Stumm 173)
- subHuman (9 July 2007 / Stumm 279)

=== Compilation albums ===
- Selected (19 April 2010)

=== Singles ===
- "Faith Healer" (9 March 1992 / Mute 110) UK No. 60
- "Drifting" (13 October 1997 / Mute 209)
- "Stalker / Missing Piece" (9 March 1998 / Mute 214)
- "Strange Hours" (3 April 2000 / Mute 232)
- "Jezebel" (21 August 2000 / Mute 233)
- "Prey" (25 June 2007 / iMute 372)
- "Prey / Allelujah" (enhanced CD) (25 February 2008 / CDMute372)

=== Video ===
- A Strange Hour in Budapest (2012)

=== Other releases ===
- "Dum Dum Girl" – Spirit of Talk Talk (2012) by various artists
- "Inheritance" – Spirit of Talk Talk (2012) by various artists
