= For the Masses =

1998 tribute album

Compilation album by various artists
- Released: 4 August 1998
- Recorded: 1993–1998
- Genre: Alternative rock; electronic; alternative metal
- Length: 73:48
- Label: 1500/A&M
- Producer: Philip Blaine (exec.); Gary Richards (exec.)

Singles from For the Masses
- 1. "Stripped" Released: 28 July 1998

For the Masses is a 1998 tribute album to the British band Depeche Mode, specifically the works of Martin Gore. The album charted in America and reached the Top 20 in Germany, making it the most successful Depeche Mode tribute album of all time. The album title is taken from Depeche Mode's 1987 album Music for the Masses. The album cover was photographed by Martyn Atkins who shot and designed early Depeche Mode artwork; the whole album artwork is consistent with the past Depeche Mode albums.

== Background ==
The project was started by the band members of God Lives Underwater, David Reilly in particular, in collaboration with their manager Gary Richards and Philip Blaine of 1500 Records (an A&M Records label until 2001), featuring a wide array of bands including the Cure, the Smashing Pumpkins, Deftones, Rammstein, and Meat Beat Manifesto. Nine Inch Nails, Marilyn Manson, and Foo Fighters wanted to do tracks but schedule complications prevented them. Manson, who wanted to cover "Personal Jesus", eventually did so for his greatest hits album Lest We Forget: The Best of in 2004. Credited executive producers for the album are Philip Blaine and Gary Richards.

== Release ==
The compact disc release features a notoriously poor use of HDCD encoding. When decoded as HDCD, one channel signals a −4 dB gain adjustment throughout, making it noticeably quieter than the other. If played as a regular CD, however, the gain adjustment information is ignored.

The Smashing Pumpkins version of "Never Let Me Down Again" was originally released a few years previously as a B-side for "Rocket". Billy Corgan of the Smashing Pumpkins performed the song "Never Let Me Down Again" with Depeche Mode at the KROQ Acoustic Christmas concert in 1998. The "World in My Eyes" cover by the Cure also appears on the Cure box set Join the Dots.

Rammstein released their cover of "Stripped" as a single, accompanied by a controversial music video, directed by Philipp Stölzl, which uses excerpts from Olympia, a Leni Riefenstahl documentary film covering the 1936 Olympic Games in Berlin. The single charted at No. 14 in Germany. A live version is available on the Völkerball DVD.

== Reception ==
Professional ratings
Review scores
Source	Rating
AllMusic	2.5/5 stars
NME	4/10 stars

In his critical review for AllMusic, Stephen Thomas Erlewine writes that Depeche Mode songs are "difficult to cover without replicating the original arrangements" and that only a few bands succeeded in making the songs their own. He singles out the versions from the Smashing Pumpkins, the Cure, Gus Gus, and Rammstein, stating that "they're almost good enough to make the overall mediocrity of the album worthwhile".

NME states that this tribute album is "not about investigating Depeche Mode's legacy, but massaging swollen egos". The Smashing Pumpkins and the Cure are commended for attempting something different while the rest of the entries fail in adding their own twist to the songs and are hoping for "some controversy-free exposure".

== Track listing ==
All tracks are written by Martin Gore.

No.	Title	Artist	Length
1.	"Never Let Me Down Again" (from Music for the Masses, 1987)	The Smashing Pumpkins	4:01
2.	"Fly on the Windscreen" (from Black Celebration, 1986)	God Lives Underwater	5:22
3.	"Enjoy the Silence" (from Violator, 1990)	Failure	4:20
4.	"World in My Eyes" (from Violator, 1990)	The Cure	4:51
5.	"Policy of Truth" (from Violator, 1990)	Dishwalla	3:45
6.	"Somebody" (from Some Great Reward, 1984)	Veruca Salt	4:05
7.	"Everything Counts" (from Construction Time Again, 1983)	Meat Beat Manifesto	5:24
8.	"Shake the Disease" (from The Singles 81→85, 1985)	Hooverphonic	3:59
9.	"Master and Servant" (from Some Great Reward, 1984)	Locust	3:40
10.	"Shame" (from Construction Time Again, 1983)	Self	4:12
11.	"Black Celebration" (from Black Celebration, 1986)	Monster Magnet	4:16
12.	"Waiting for the Night" (from Violator, 1990)	Rabbit in the Moon	7:34
13.	"I Feel You" (from Songs of Faith and Devotion, 1993)	Apollo Four Forty	5:21
14.	"Monument" (from A Broken Frame, 1982)	GusGus	5:21
15.	"To Have and to Hold" (from Music for the Masses, 1987)	Deftones	2:53
16.	"Stripped" (from Black Celebration, 1986)	Rammstein	4:44
Total length:			73:48

== Charts ==
Chart performance for For the Masses
Chart (1998)	Peak position
US Billboard 200	69
