= The Best of Depeche Mode Volume 1 =

2006 greatest hits album by Depeche Mode

Greatest hits album by Depeche Mode
- Released: 8 November 2006
- Recorded: 1981–2005
- Length: 74:56
- Label: Mute
- Producers: David Bascombe; Mark Bell; Depeche Mode; Flood; Ben Hillier; Daniel Miller; Tim Simenon
- Compilers: Roland Brown; Daniel Miller

Depeche Mode chronology
Recording the Angel (2006)	The Best of Depeche Mode Volume 1 (2006)	Sounds of the Universe (2009)

Singles from The Best of Depeche Mode Volume 1
- 1. "Martyr" Released: 30 October 2006

Professional ratings
Review scores
Source	Rating
AllMusic	4.5/5 stars
The Encyclopedia of Popular Music	4/5 stars
laut.de	3/5 stars
Pitchfork	8.2/10

The Best of Depeche Mode Volume 1 is a greatest hits album by the English electronic music band Depeche Mode, released on 8 November 2006 by Mute Records. The album consists of select Depeche Mode singles from their then-25-year career, as well as the previously unreleased track "Martyr"—recorded during the Playing the Angel sessions—which was released as a single in late October 2006.

The album has sold over one million copies in Europe alone and has been awarded the IFPI Platinum Europe Award.

== Track listing ==
All tracks are written by Martin L. Gore, except where noted.

No.	Title	Writer(s)	Original Album	Length
1.	"Personal Jesus"		Violator, 1990	3:47
2.	"Just Can't Get Enough"	Vince Clarke	Speak & Spell, 1981	3:43
3.	"Everything Counts"		Construction Time Again, 1983	4:01
4.	"Enjoy the Silence"		Violator	4:15
5.	"Shake the Disease"		The Singles 81→85, 1985	4:52
6.	"See You"		A Broken Frame, 1982	3:58
7.	"It's No Good"		Ultra, 1997	5:59
8.	"Strangelove"		Music for the Masses, 1987	3:47
9.	"Suffer Well"	Dave Gahan; Eigner; Phillpott	Playing the Angel, 2005	3:53
10.	"Dream On"		Exciter, 2001	3:42
11.	"People Are People"		Some Great Reward, 1984	3:46
12.	"Martyr"		previously unreleased	3:25
13.	"Walking in My Shoes"		Songs of Faith and Devotion, 1993	5:01
14.	"I Feel You"		Songs of Faith and Devotion	4:35
15.	"Precious"		Playing the Angel	4:09
16.	"Master and Servant"		Some Great Reward	3:49
17.	"New Life"	Clarke	Speak & Spell	3:46
18.	"Never Let Me Down Again"		Music for the Masses	4:18
Total length:				74:56

iTunes Store bonus tracks

1. "Personal Jesus" (Boys Noize Rework) – 6:55
2. "Never Let Me Down Again" (Digitalism Remix) – 4:40
3. "Everything Counts" (Oliver Huntemann & Stephan Bodzin Dub) – 6:55
4. "People Are People" (Underground Resistance Assault DJ 3000 Remix) – 7:24
5. "Personal Jesus" (Heartthrob Rework 2) – 5:15

=== The Best of Depeche Mode Videos Volume 1 DVD ===
Limited edition copies of The Best of Depeche Mode Volume 1 (LCDMUTEL15) include a bonus DVD of music videos and The Best of Depeche Mode Volume 1 (A Short Film), which is a 30 minute electronic press kit (EPK) featuring interviews with the band (including former members Vince Clarke and Alan Wilder) and associates on all the songs included on the album. The cover art for this version has a pink flower rather than the white flower depicted on the cover of the regular CD.

On 16 March 2007, the DVD was released on its own as The Best of Depeche Mode Videos Volume 1.

Track listing

1. "Just Can't Get Enough" – (Directed by Clive Richardson)*
2. "Everything Counts" – (Directed by Clive Richardson)*
3. "People Are People" – (Directed by Clive Richardson)**
4. "Master & Servant – (Directed by Clive Richardson)*
5. "Shake the Disease" – (Directed by Peter Care)*
6. "Stripped" – (Directed by Peter Care)
7. "A Question of Time" – (Directed by Anton Corbijn)
8. "Strangelove" – (Directed by Anton Corbijn)
9. "Never Let Me Down Again" – (Directed by Anton Corbijn)
10. "Behind the Wheel" – (Directed by Anton Corbijn)
11. "Personal Jesus" – (Directed by Anton Corbijn)
12. "Enjoy the Silence" – (Directed by Anton Corbijn)
13. "I Feel You" – (Directed by Anton Corbijn)
14. "Walking in My Shoes" – (Directed by Anton Corbijn)
15. "In Your Room" – (Directed by Anton Corbijn)
16. "Barrel of a Gun" – (Directed by Anton Corbijn)
17. "It's No Good" – (Directed by Anton Corbijn)
18. "Only When I Lose Myself" – (Directed by Brian Griffin)
19. "Dream On" – (Directed by Stéphane Sednaoui)**
20. "I Feel Loved" – (Directed by John Hillcoat)**
21. "Enjoy the Silence '04 – (Directed by Uwe Flade)**
22. "Precious" – (Directed by Uwe Flade)
23. "Suffer Well" – (Directed by Anton Corbijn)
24. The Best of Depeche Mode Volume 1 (A Short Film)

* First official release on DVD
** First official release on any home video format ("People Are People"'s regular video was not used in the original Some Great Videos release. None of the Exciter videos or "Enjoy the Silence 04" were released commercially on home video prior to Best of)

== Personnel ==
=== Depeche Mode ===
- Dave Gahan – lead vocals, sampler, percussion on "Personal Jesus"
- Martin Gore – guitar, keyboard, acoustic guitar ("Personal Jesus", "Dream On", "People Are People"), bass ("Suffer Well"), melodica ("Everything Counts"), backing vocals, sampler, co-lead vocals ("Everything Counts", "Shake the Disease", "People Are People", "Never Let Me Down Again"), percussion
- Andy Fletcher – keyboard, sampler, backing vocals, bass guitar, percussion
- Alan Wilder – keyboard, drum machine and backing vocals, electronic drums ("Personal Jesus"), drums ("Walking in My Shoes", "I Feel You"), sampler, bass guitar ("Walking in My Shoes"), percussion
- Vince Clarke – keyboard, drum machine, and backing vocals ("Just Can't Get Enough" and "New Life")

=== Other musicians ===
- Victor Indrizzo – percussion ("It's No Good")
- Flood – additional percussion ("Personal Jesus"), additional keyboards and programming ("Personal Jesus", "Enjoy the Silence", "Walking in My Shoes", "I Feel You")
- Mark Bell – drum machine ("Dream On")
- Daniel Miller – additional synthesizer ("Just Can't Get Enough", "See You", "New Life"), additional production ("Strangelove")
- Gareth Jones – additional production, pre-production ("Dream On")
- Richard Morris, Dave McCracken – programming ("Suffer Well", "Precious"); synthesizers and drum machines ("Martyr")
- Christian Eigner – drums ("Martyr"), original programming ("Suffer Well")
- Andrew Phillpott – original programming ("Suffer Well")

== Charts ==
=== Weekly charts ===
2006–2007 weekly chart performance for The Best of Depeche Mode Volume 1
Chart (2006–2007)	Peak position
Austrian Albums (Ö3 Austria)	9
Belgian Albums (Ultratop Flanders)	8
Belgian Albums (Ultratop Wallonia)	5
Canadian Albums (Nielsen SoundScan)	53
Croatian Albums (HDU)	4
Czech Albums (ČNS IFPI)	8
Danish Albums (Hitlisten)	12
Dutch Albums (Album Top 100)	40
European Albums (Billboard)	2
Finnish Albums (Suomen virallinen lista)	15
French Compilation Albums (SNEP)	2
German Albums (Offizielle Top 100)	1
Greek Albums (IFPI)	7
Hungarian Albums (MAHASZ)	5
Irish Albums (IRMA)	17
Italian Albums (FIMI)	5
Japanese Albums (Oricon)	197
Norwegian Albums (VG-lista)	14
Polish Albums (ZPAV)	14
Portuguese Albums (AFP)	10
Scottish Albums (Official Charts)	16
Spanish Albums (Promusicae)	14
Swedish Albums (Sverigetopplistan)	13
Swiss Albums (Schweizer Hitparade)	3
UK Albums (Official Charts)	18
US Top Dance Albums (Billboard)	2

2013 weekly chart performance for The Best of Depeche Mode Volume 1
Chart (2013)	Peak position
French Albums (SNEP)	36

=== Year-end charts ===
2006 year-end chart performance for The Best of Depeche Mode Volume 1
Chart (2006)	Position
Belgian Albums (Ultratop Flanders)	89
Belgian Albums (Ultratop Wallonia)	55
Danish Albums (Hitlisten)	68
German Albums (Offizielle Top 100)	88
Hungarian Albums (MAHASZ)	39
Italian Albums (FIMI)	26
Swiss Albums (Schweizer Hitparade)	52

2007 year-end chart performance for The Best of Depeche Mode Volume 1
Chart (2007)	Position
European Albums (Billboard)	44
German Albums (Offizielle Top 100)	39
Hungarian Albums (MAHASZ)	44
Italian Albums (FIMI)	62
US Top Dance/Electronic Albums (Billboard)	4

== Certifications ==
Certifications for The Best of Depeche Mode Volume 1
Region	Certification	Certified units/sales
Argentina (CAPIF)	Gold	20,000^{^}
Belgium (BRMA)	Platinum	50,000^{*}
Denmark (IFPI Danmark)	3× Platinum	60,000^{‡}
France (SNEP)	Gold	75,000^{*}
Germany (BVMI)	7× Gold	700,000^{‡}
Hungary (MAHASZ)	Platinum	6,000^{^}
Ireland (IRMA)	Gold	7,500^{^}
Italy sales in 2006	—	150,000
Italy (FIMI) sales since 2009	Platinum	60,000^{*}
Portugal (AFP)	Gold	10,000^{^}
Russia (NFPF)	Platinum	20,000^{*}
Spain (Promusicae)	Gold	40,000^{^}
Switzerland (IFPI Switzerland)	Gold	15,000^{^}
United Kingdom (BPI)	2× Platinum	600,000^{‡}
Summaries
Europe (IFPI)	Platinum	1,000,000^{*}
^{*} Sales figures based on certification alone.^{^} Shipments figures based on certification alone.^{‡} Sales+streaming figures based on certification alone.

== Release history ==
Release history for The Best of Depeche Mode Volume 1
Region	Date	Label	Ref.
Japan	8 November 2006	EMI	
Germany	9 November 2006	EMI	
France	13 November 2006	Labels	
United Kingdom	13 November 2006	Mute	
Canada	14 November 2006	Sire; Reprise	
United States	14 November 2006	Sire; Reprise	
