= Greatest Hits (Depeche Mode album) =

Greatest hits album by Depeche Mode
- Released: 1987
- Recorded: April 1983 – January 1986
- Length: 49:17
- Label: Amiga
- Producer: Depeche Mode; Daniel Miller; Gareth Jones

Depeche Mode chronology
Black Celebration (1986)	Greatest Hits (1987)	Music for the Masses (1987)

Greatest Hits is a greatest hits album by the English electronic music band Depeche Mode, released in 1987 by Amiga. It was released exclusively in East Germany on LP and cassette.

== Background and release ==
Depeche Mode had acquired a fanbase in East Germany from illegal recordings and their performances behind the Iron Curtain starting in 1985, and Greatest Hits was their first legally available release in the GDR. Their UK label, Mute Records, worked with Intercord and Amiga Records in West and East Germany to produce an official release for East Germany. There was only an agreement for a single release, and limited funds available, so they jointly decided to release a twelve-track greatest hits LP. Only 15,000 copies were pressed, and the cover was a slightly altered version of the cover used for The Singles 81→85 (1985) / Catching Up with Depeche Mode (1985).

Amiga released the album on LP (catalogue number 8 56 260) and cassette (0 56 260). Specially-printed copies for exclusive use of VEB Deutsche Schallplatte were also printed. The master plates used to create the pressing were found in a scrapyard in 2006.

== Track listing ==
Source for this section:

Side 1

1. "Shake the Disease" – 4:45
2. "A Question of Lust" – 4:24
3. "It's Called a Heart" – 3:45
4. "Blasphemous Rumours" – 5:06
5. "Everything Counts" – 3:57
6. "People Are People" – 3:43

Side 2

1. "Master and Servant" – 3:50
2. "Something to Do" – 3:44
3. "Stripped" – 4:13
4. "Here Is the House" – 4:16
5. "It Doesn't Matter" – 4:45
6. "It Doesn't Matter Two" – 2:49
