= Stripped (song) =

1986 song by Depeche Mode

Single by Depeche Mode

from the album Black Celebration
- B-side: "But Not Tonight"; "Breathing in Fumes"; "Black Day"
- Released: 10 February 1986
- Recorded: November 1985 – early 1986
- Studio: Westside (London); Hansa Mischraum (Berlin)
- Genre: Synth-pop; dark wave
- Length: 3:52 (7″ single version); 4:14 (album version); 6:42 (12″ version)
- Label: Mute
- Songwriter: Martin Gore
- Producers: Depeche Mode; Gareth Jones; Daniel Miller

Depeche Mode singles chronology
"It's Called a Heart" (1985)	"Stripped" (1986)	"A Question of Lust" (1986)

"Stripped" is a song by the English electronic band Depeche Mode. It was released as the lead single from their fifth studio album Black Celebration (1986) on 10 February 1986, through Mute Records. Written by the band's lead songwriter Martin Gore, "Stripped" incorporates various samples into the song; most notably, the sound of an idling car engine.

It was the band's sixth consecutive single to enter the UK Top 20, peaking at number 15. Elsewhere, it peaked at No. 4 in Germany and reached the top 10 in Finland, Sweden and Switzerland. German metal band Rammstein later covered the song for the 1998 Depeche Mode tribute album For the Masses.

== Background ==
Depeche Mode released two non-album singles, "Shake the Disease" and "It's Called a Heart" in April and September 1985 respectively, and had entered the studio in November 1985 to begin work on their first studio album since Some Great Reward (1984).

== Recording ==
Recording for "Stripped" began the first week of November 1985 at Westside Studios in London. According to Alan Wilder, it was one of the few songs that was "easy" to record. As with their previous albums, Depeche Mode incorporated samples into their songs, which the band always created in-house. Gore's demo of "Stripped" incorporated the sound of an idling motorcycle; the album version instead sampled singer Dave Gahan's idling Porsche 911. They also included the sound of a bottle rocket in the song, as they were recording "Stripped" on Guy Fawkes Night, 5 November. To get the sound of the fireworks, they launched the rockets horizontally so that several microphones, set up in sequence, could capture the sound of the firework fizzing by. Final mixing for the song took place at Hansa Studios in early 1986.

While making the album, Andy Fletcher said that "the idea of 'Stripped' is to get away from technology and civilisation for a day and get back to basics in the country. It's about two people stripping down to their bare emotions. In the video we're seen demolishing a car and taking a TV apart... it's a bit, er, symbolic." Dave Gahan explained that "it's not about sex. It's to do with having nothing except yourself. The people in the song could strip off if they wanted to though."

For B-sides, the band deliberately wanted to move away from just doing "simple extended version[s]" of their singles, instead opting to include "experimental" tracks "Black Day" and "Breathing in Fumes", which were based on album tracks "Black Celebration" and "Stripped", respectively. Also included as a B-side was "But Not Tonight", which the band's US label, Sire Records, included on the soundtrack to the movie Modern Girls (1986), in part because it was "the only optimistic and slightly upbeat track from the Black Celebration recording sessions."

In 1987, Gore said that "Stripped" was his favorite Depeche Mode song to date.

== Release and promotion ==
"Stripped"
A 14 second sample of "Stripped" illustrating the distorted and slowed-down sound of a car engine running as a percussive element.

=== "Stripped" ===
"Stripped" was released as the lead single to the album Black Celebration on 10 February 1986, a month before the album. Released by Mute Records in the UK and Intercord Records in Germany, the single saw 7" and 12" vinyl releases. In the UK, the 7" and 12" were assigned catalogue numbers 7BONG10 and 12BONG10, and in Germany, the initial copies of the 7" (catalogue number INT 111.834) were issued on red vinyl. In Japan, the 7" was released promotionally by Warner-Pioneer with catalogue number P-2097, and promotional copies of the 7" were distributed in Australia and Spain as well. In addition, the UK, a rare promotional 12" containing "Breathing in Fumes" was released (with catalogue number RR12BONG10) to local dance clubs with a press release calling it "an aggressive dance track with some spectacular effects that sound great at high volume – it's got an almost hip hop drumtrack that is very persuasive and effective and it should have no problem in getting great floor response from the first play onward."

The band and label's hopes for the single were high, with Gahan saying that the song "excites me. It feels powerful to sing. The chorus is rousing and mob-like which I can get off on," and they were disappointed when it only made it to number 15 in the UK. In a 1998 interview, Gore said that the single marked a turning point for the band, saying "since the Black Celebration album we've started getting things right, and 'Stripped' is one of the best atmospheres we've ever captured."

=== "But Not Tonight" ===
"But Not Tonight"

Single by Depeche Mode

from the album Black Celebration (U.S. edition)
- B-side: "Stripped"
- Released: 22 October 1986
- Genre: Synth-pop
- Length: 4:15 (album version); 3:54 (single version); 5:14 (extended remix); 6:17 (12″ mix)
- Label: Sire
- Songwriter: Martin Gore
- Producers: Depeche Mode; Gareth Jones; Daniel Miller

Depeche Mode singles chronology
"A Question of Time" (1986)	"But Not Tonight" (1986)	"Strangelove" (1987)

In the US, label Sire Records decided that B-side "But Not Tonight" was a better choice for their American audience, and so "Stripped" was not released as a single in that country. Martin Gore expressed his frustration with the American release in the 2007 documentary The Songs Aren't Good Enough, There Aren't Any Singles and It'll Never Get Played on the Radio, saying, "The worst thing, though, about 'Stripped' was the Americans, who somehow decided to not release it at all and to put out the B-side, 'But Not Tonight,' because they got it into some dodgy film. [For] 'Stripped', we took nine days mixing and God knows how long recording, and, you know, 'But Not Tonight' I think we did in about three hours. And the Americans in their wisdom decided to release that instead." Wilder echoed this sentiment, saying "I don't pretend to understand it but whenever we 'deliver' a product, they want something different that 'suits their market'," indicating a strained relationship between the band and their US label.

Released on 22 October 1986 on 7" and 12" vinyl by Sire Records with catalogue numbers 7-28564 and 0-20578, "But Not Tonight" failed to chart in the US despite its inclusion on the soundtrack for the movie Modern Girls (1986), which itself was considered a commercial failure. Later, then-Senior VP Craig Kostich at Reprise admitted that "sometimes you're right, and sometimes you're wrong" regarding the label's decision to push "But Not Tonight" instead of "Stripped". Gore later said that this was the last time they allowed their label to "bully" them, saying "the last time that happened at all, I think, was in 1986 when our American record company (Sire) made us flip 'Stripped', which we'd spent three weeks perfecting – for the B-side, 'But Not Tonight', which was a throwaway thing we did in a day, because there was some naff film, called Modern Girls, that wanted to use it. It bombed, they lost our respect and that was it."

=== Music videos ===
The music video for "Stripped" was directed by Peter Care and was filmed outside Hansa Studios in Berlin. The video for "Stripped" appears on The Videos 86>98 (1998), the DVD of The Best of Depeche Mode Volume 1 (2006) and Video Singles Collection (2016).

A music video was also shot for "But Not Tonight", directed by Tamra Davis. The video, in which the band appeared bored while miming playing their instruments in a nameless film studio, was not released until the video collection The Videos 86–98+ (2002) was made available, leading to many fans not even knowing the video existed until 2002.

== Reception ==
John Freeman of The Quietus described "Stripped" as an "ominous and intriguing pop song".

== Other releases ==
Versions of "Stripped" have appeared on compilations such as Greatest Hits (1987) and The Singles 86–98 (1998). Live versions of the song appear on 101 (1989), Devotional (1993), releases of Recording the Angel (2006) and Recording the Universe (2010), Tour of the Universe: Barcelona 20/21.11.09 (2010) and on Spirits in the Forest (2019). "Stripped" also appeared on the soundtrack to the movie Say Anything... (1989).

"But Not Tonight" appeared on Remixes 81–04 (2004).

== Track listings ==
7": Mute / 7Bong10 (UK)

1. "Stripped" – 3:52
2. "But Not Tonight" – 4:15

12": Mute / 12Bong10 (UK)

1. "Stripped (Highland Mix)" – 6:42
2. "But Not Tonight (Extended Remix)" – 5:13
3. "Breathing in Fumes" – 6:07
4. "Fly on the Windscreen (Quiet Mix)" – 4:24
5. "Black Day" – 2:37

CD: Mute / CDBong10 (UK)

1. "Stripped" – 3:52
2. "But Not Tonight" – 4:15
3. "Stripped (Highland Mix)" – 6:42
4. "But Not Tonight (Extended Remix)" – 5:13
5. "Breathing in Fumes" – 6:07
6. "Fly on the Windscreen (Quiet Mix)" – 4:24
7. "Black Day" – 2:37

The CD single was released in 1991 as part of the singles box set compilations.

7": Sire / 7-28564 (US)

1. "But Not Tonight" [*] – 3:52
2. "Stripped " – 3:59

12": Sire / 0-20578 (US)

1. "But Not Tonight (Extended Mix)" [*] – 6:18
2. "Breathing in Fumes" – 6:07
3. "Stripped (Highland Mix)" – 6:42
4. "Black Day" – 2:37

[*] The 7" and 12" versions on the US "But Not Tonight" single are different versions than used on the UK singles – they were remixed by Robert Margouleff. The 12" mix later appeared on the rare fourth disc of Depeche Mode's remix compilation, Remixes 81–04, as the "Margouleff Dance Mix."

CD: Intercord / INT 826.835 (Germany)

1. "Stripped (Highland Mix)" – 6:42
2. "But Not Tonight (Extended Remix)" – 5:12 [*]
3. "Breathing in Fumes" – 6:07
4. "Fly on the Windscreen (Quiet Mix)" – 4:24
5. "Black Day" – 2:37

[*] This is the UK Extended 12" version. The German CD was released in 1986

All songs written by Martin Gore except "Black Day" which is written by Gore, Alan Wilder, and Daniel Miller

== Charts ==
=== Weekly charts ===
Weekly chart performance for "Stripped"
Chart (1986)	Peak position
Europe (European Hot 100 Singles)	10
Finland (Suomen virallinen lista)	10
Ireland (IRMA)	6
Italy (Musica e dischi)	16
New Zealand (Recorded Music NZ)	41
Sweden (Sverigetopplistan)	9
Switzerland (Schweizer Hitparade)	8
UK Singles (Official Charts)	15
UK Indie (OCC)	1
West Germany (GfK)	4

=== Year-end charts ===
Year-end chart performance for "Stripped"
Chart (1986)	Position
West Germany (Media Control)	48

In Australia, "Stripped" missed the Kent Music Report top 100 singles chart but was listed as one of the singles receiving significant sales reports beyond the top 100 for six non-consecutive weeks in May and June 1986, with its highest ranking being fourth on this list.

== Rammstein cover ==
"Stripped"

Single by Rammstein

from the album For the Masses
- B-side: Remixes of "Stripped"
- Released: 28 July 1998
- Genre: Neue Deutsche Härte; industrial metal
- Length: 4:25
- Label: Motor
- Songwriter: Martin Gore
- Producers: Jacob Hellner; Rammstein

Rammstein singles chronology
"Du riechst so gut '98" (1998)	"Stripped" (1998)	"Asche zu Asche" (2001)

Music video
- "Stripped" on YouTube

Neue Deutsche Härte band Rammstein recorded a cover of "Stripped" for the 1998 Depeche Mode tribute album For the Masses. This version cut the line "Let me see you stripped down to the bone" to "Let me see you stripped" because of singer Till Lindemann's difficulty singing "down to the bone" in a manner that fit with the rest of the song (the entire line is restored in the "Heavy Mental Mix" by Charlie Clouser). Released as a single on 28 July 1998, it reached number 14 on the German single charts. The song also appears as the twelfth track on some special editions of the band's sophomore release, Sehnsucht (1997). It was also the band's first song done entirely in English.

The video for the song incorporated footage from Olympia, a documentary film on the 1936 Summer Olympics directed by Leni Riefenstahl. Following the Second World War, Riefenstahl was classified as a Nazi sympathizer by postwar authorities; the choice to use footage from a film by her led to threats against the band. Members of the band praised Riefenstahl's filmmaking abilities and aesthetic choices in a 2011 documentary of the making of the video, particularly the imagery of the athletes, while simultaneously disassociating themselves from Riefenstahl's political views. Members of Depeche Mode, especially Dave Gahan, responded positively to the cover, since it was so different from any other versions of Depeche Mode's work.

=== Track listing ===
1. "Stripped" – 4:25
2. "Stripped" (Psilonaut Mix by Johan Edlund-Tiamat) – 4:28
3. "Stripped" (Heavy Mental Mix by Charlie Clouser) – 5:12
4. "Stripped" (Tribute to Düsseldorf Mix by Charlie Clouser) – 5:10
5. "Stripped" (FKK Mix by Günter Schulz-KMFDM) – 4:35
6. "Wollt ihr das bett in Flammen sehen?" (Live Arena, Berlin '96; video) – 5:01

=== Charts ===
==== Weekly charts ====
Weekly chart performance for "Stripped"
Chart (1998–1999)	Peak position
Australia (ARIA)	72
Austria (Ö3 Austria Top 40)	27
Germany (GfK)	14
Switzerland (Schweizer Hitparade)	42

==== Year-end charts ====
Year-end chart performance for "Stripped"
Chart (1998)	Position
Germany (Media Control)	94
