= Video Singles Collection =

Video by Depeche Mode
- Released: 18 November 2016
- Genres: Synth-pop; alternative dance; electronic rock; dance-rock; new wave
- Length: 383 minutes (including commentaries)
- Label: Sony Music

Depeche Mode chronology
| Live in Berlin (2014) | Video Singles Collection (2016) | Live Spirits (2020) |

Video Singles Collection is a 2016 three-DVD music video compilation by Depeche Mode, containing all the videos released for singles by the band between 1981 and 2013.

The compilation is the first official Depeche Mode archival title to be released under the Sony imprimatur since SME acquired rights to the band's catalog in July 2015. The videos have been restored for this collection, and some of the videos have audio commentaries from members Dave Gahan, Martin Gore and Andy Fletcher.

Most videos on the DVDs are in 4:3 aspect ratio (including ten videos recorded in 16:9, which are letterboxed), but a few later videos are in anamorphic 16:9.

== Track listing ==
| Title | | Director | Commentary |
|---|---|---|---|
| 1 | "Just Can't Get Enough" | Clive Richardson | Fletcher, Gahan, Gore |
| 2 | "See You" | Julien Temple | Fletcher, Gore |
| 3 | "The Meaning of Love" | Julien Temple | Gore |
| 4 | "Leave in Silence" | Julien Temple | |
| 5 | "Get the Balance Right!" | Kevin Hewitt | Gahan |
| 6 | "Everything Counts" | Clive Richardson | |
| 7 | "Love, in Itself" | Clive Richardson | |
| 8 | "People Are People" | Clive Richardson | |
| 9 | "Master and Servant" | Clive Richardson | Fletcher |
| 10 | "Blasphemous Rumours" | Clive Richardson | |
| 11 | "Somebody" | Clive Richardson | |
| 12 | "Shake the Disease" | Peter Care | Fletcher |
| 13 | "It's Called a Heart" | Peter Care | Gore |
| 14 | "Stripped" | Peter Care | Gahan, Gore |
| 15 | "But Not Tonight" | Tamra Davis | |
| 16 | "A Question of Lust" | Clive Richardson | |
| 17 | "A Question of Time" | Anton Corbijn | Gore |
| 18 | "Strangelove" | Anton Corbijn | Fletcher, Gahan |
| 19 | "Never Let Me Down Again" | Anton Corbijn | Fletcher, Gahan |
| 20 | "Behind the Wheel" | Anton Corbijn | Fletcher, Gahan |
| 21 | "Little 15" | Martyn Atkins | |
| 22 | "Strangelove '88" | Martyn Atkins | |
| 23 | "Everything Counts" (Live) | D.A. Pennebaker | |
| 24 | "Personal Jesus" | Anton Corbijn | Fletcher |
| 25 | "Enjoy the Silence" | Anton Corbijn | Gahan, Gore |
| 26 | "Policy of Truth" | Anton Corbijn | |
| 27 | "World in My Eyes" | Anton Corbijn | |
| 28 | "I Feel You" | Anton Corbijn | Gahan |
| 29 | "Walking in My Shoes" | Anton Corbijn | Gore |
| 30 | "Condemnation" | Anton Corbijn | |
| 31 | "One Caress" | Kevin Kerslake | |
| 32 | "In Your Room" | Anton Corbijn | Gore |
| 33 | "Barrel of a Gun" | Anton Corbijn | Gore |
| 34 | "It's No Good" | Anton Corbijn | Fletcher, Gahan |
| 35 | "Home" | Steven Green | |
| 36 | "Useless" | Anton Corbijn | |
| 37 | "Only When I Lose Myself" | Brian Griffin | |
| 38 | "Dream On" | Stéphane Sednaoui | |
| 39 | "I Feel Loved" | John Hillcoat | |
| 40 | "Freelove" | John Hillcoat | Gore |
| 41 | "Goodnight Lovers" | John Hillcoat | |
| 42 | "Enjoy the Silence '04" | Uwe Flade | |
| 43 | "Precious" | Uwe Flade | |
| 44 | "A Pain That I'm Used To" | Uwe Flade | |
| 45 | "Suffer Well" | Anton Corbijn | Gahan |
| 46 | "John the Revelator" | Blue Leach | |
| 47 | "Martyr" | Rob Chandler | |
| 48 | "Wrong" | Patrick Daughters | Fletcher, Gahan |
| 49 | "Peace" | Jonas & François | |
| 50 | "Hole to Feed" | Eric Wareheim | |
| 51 | "Fragile Tension" | Barney Steel, Rob Chandler | |
| 52 | "Personal Jesus 2011" | Patrick Daughters | |
| 53 | "Heaven" | Timothy Saccenti | |
| 54 | "Soothe My Soul" | Warren Fu | |
| 55 | "Should Be Higher" (Live) | Anton Corbijn | |
Bonus alternate music videos
| 1 | "People Are People" (12″ version) | Clive Richardson | |
| 2 | "Stripped" (Unreleased alternate cut) | Peter Care | |
| 3 | "But Not Tonight" (Pool version) | Tamra Davis | |
| 4 | "Soothe My Soul" (Extended) | Warren Fu | |
