= People Are People =

1984 single by Depeche Mode

Single by Depeche Mode

from the album Some Great Reward
- B-side: "In Your Memory"
- Released: 12 March 1984
- Studio: Hansa Mischraum (Berlin)
- Genre: Synth-pop; dance-pop; industrial
- Length: 3:43 (single version); 3:52 (album version); 7:11 (12″ version)
- Label: Mute
- Songwriter: Martin L. Gore
- Producers: Daniel Miller; Depeche Mode; Gareth Jones

Depeche Mode singles chronology
"Love, in Itself" (1983)	"People Are People" (1984)	"Master and Servant" (1984)

Music video
- "People Are People" on YouTube

"People Are People" is a song by the English electronic music band Depeche Mode, released on 12 March 1984 as the lead single from their fourth studio album, Some Great Reward (1984). Recorded at Hansa Mischraum in West Berlin, it was the band's biggest hit to date: it hit number 1 in West Germany, was the first Top 20 single in the United States, peaking at number 13 on the Billboard Hot 100, and was their highest charting single in the UK to date, hitting number 4.

== Background ==
Depeche Mode had released their previous studio album, Construction Time Again in August 1983 and had followed up with a tour that ran from September through December that year, although the band played a variety of one-off shows through June 1984. Starting in December 1983, as their tour wrapped up, they started their recording sessions at Music Works Studios in North London. Their initial plan had been to record the album in London before going back to West Berlin to Hansa Studios to mix and master the album, as they had done for Construction Time Again. However, due to recording taking longer than planned (they had rented a room at Music Works only for a short time), most of the recording for the album actually took place at Hansa. The band wanted to shed the "teenybopper" image they'd acquired with the first album and early singles, and felt that the "big" sound produced at Hansa combined with their improved songwriting and image, they were starting to be taken more seriously as musicians. "People Are People" continued with the socially- and politically-conscious themes of their songs, as they had started on Construction Time Again. Gore partly drew on his own experiences of being taunted on the streets of his hometown Basildon because of his appearance for the lyrical content of the song.

== Recording ==
"People Are People" was a song that was started at the London sessions, but finished at Hansa. According to Wilder, the track was the first to "benefit from a period of pre-programming to save studio time," although some time was lost when one of the band tripped over the power cord before all the work had been saved.

Producer Gareth Jones remembered that, compared to how they recorded tracks for the previous album, Construction Time Again,

"We went even more extreme in our practice of sending instruments out into different rooms and amps. We rented two studios at Hansa - the huge hall, Studio 2, as well as the mix room. In Studio 2 we put a huge PA system and an array of mics going down the hall; many of the beats went out into this. We also had another system in the bright reverb-y recording room upstairs by the mix room. Lots of these effects were running live in the mix."

Band member Alan Wilder agreed, saying that "the vocals were recorded in a big room - that is, the vocals were sent down through a PA into a big, live room so we could not only get a great, big sound, but so we could effects like echo on the vocal while it was being recorded and mixed afterwards on the desk."

The song included heavy use of sampled sounds: samples included running water, doors creaking, and the sound of hitting an anvil, plus "everything from acoustic bass drums through to an airline hostess going through pre take-off drill". Said Gore,

"I took a stereo Sony Walkman when I was going on a plane from England to somewhere. I originally brought it along to tape the takeoff, but while the air hostess was telling everyone to 'Check the instruction cards under your seat,' the door flew open and all this wind rushed in which made a real noise and everyone laughed. Anyway, I looped the end of what she was saying and the laughter ... I used it in conjunction with a choir sound and it added a really nice texture to the bridge."

In 2017 Gahan elaborated: "We were using all these tape loops to create rhythms and the technology was quite advanced, but it wasn't anything like it is today [35 years later], the things that you can do. We used to go into studios, and the first thing we'd do, we'd ask where the kitchen was – literally for pots and pans and things that we could throw down the stairs, and record the rhythms they would make crashing around, and then make it into loops."

For the bass drum in the beginning of the song, Gore said that it was "just an acoustic bass drum sampled into the Synclavier, then we added a piece of metal to that - just a sampled anvil-type sound - to give it a slight click and make it sound a bit different." Similarly, Gore described how the bass sound in the song was altered, saying that it was a combination of the Synclavier's bass combined with "part of it being an acoustic guitar plucked with a coin".

Wilder said that most of the song was sampled into their Synclavier, making the song one of the band's first almost entirely-programmed tracks. To keep the song sonically interesting, they purposefully sequenced some sounds milliseconds out of time with each other. The song was mixed on Hansa's Solid State Logic SL 4000 mixing desk.

According to songwriter Martin Gore, the song is about racism; Wilder suggested that it could also be about war.

== Release and reception ==
"People Are People" was released on 12 March 1984, a full 6 months before the album it appeared on, Some Great Reward. In the UK, Mute Records released the single on 7", 12" and Limited 12" vinyl with catalogue numbers 7BONG5, 12BONG5 and L12BONG5, respectively. Label Intercord released the single in Germany, with catalogue numbers INT 111.818, INT 126.820, and INT 126.821, respectively, and all on colored vinyl. The limited 12" release was notable for having the first remix by an outside remixer: Adrian Sherwood. Sherwood's mix was a "radical" step away from the structure and sound of the original song, and was one of the earliest examples of the growing importance of remixes in the music industry. The single's B-side, "In Your Memory", was written by Wilder.

In the US, the song was not released until 11 July 1984, though it did not reach the Billboard Hot 100 chart until May 1985, and was initially played only on modern rock and college radio. The single would eventually peak at number 13, and was at that time, the best-performing Depeche Mode track in the US. In the UK, the single reached number four, which was at the time the band's highest singles chart position in their home country. A plan to perform the song on BBC's Top of the Pops was cancelled when a worker's strike put the show on a brief hiatus.

In West Germany, the song reached number one and was used as the theme to West German TV's coverage of the 1984 Summer Olympics, alluding to East Germany's participation in the Soviet-led boycott of the games.

In 1990, Dave Gahan listed the song among some of the music he "regrets", calling "People Are People" "too nice, too commercial". It has not been played live since 1988, and the final performance was captured on their live album/documentary 101. Although Gore dislikes the song he also recognises that "without it, we might not have been around as a band right now", and Gahan conceded that "People Are People" "was the first song of ours that made a dent, really, into popular radio".

In 2011, the song was included on the Rock and Roll Hall of Fame's list of the "500 Songs that Shaped Rock and Roll".

"People Are People" in its original or in remixed form appeared in later compilation releases, including People Are People (1984), The Singles 81→85 (1985), Greatest Hits (1987), Remixes 81–04 (2004), and The Best of Depeche Mode Volume 1 (2006).

"People Are People" appeared in its live form on The World We Live In and Live in Hamburg (1985) and 101 (1989).

== Music video ==
Clive Richardson directed the "People Are People" video. It featured footage of various military scenes from the Cold War, mixed with footage of the band aboard the British warship HMS Belfast. The video appears on the video collections Some Great Videos (1985), the DVD of The Best of Depeche Mode Volume 1 (2006) and Video Singles Collection (2016).

== Track listings ==
- 7-inch single

A. "People Are People" – 3:43
B. "In Your Memory" – 4:01

- 12-inch single

A. "People Are People" (Different Mix) – 7:11
B. "In Your Memory" (Slik Mix) – 8:12

- UK and German limited-edition 12-inch single

A. "People Are People" (On-USound Mix by Adrian Sherwood) – 7:30
B1. "People Are People" – 3:43
B2. "In Your Memory" – 4:01

- US 12-inch single

A. "People Are People" (Different Mix) – 7:11
B1. "People Are People" (On-USound Mix) – 7:30
B2. "In Your Memory" – 4:01

"In Your Memory" is falsely labeled as the "Slik Mix Edit"

- French and German CD single (1988)
1. "People Are People" (Different Mix) – 7:11
2. "In Your Memory" (Slik Mix) – 8:12
3. "People Are People" (7″ Version) – 3:50
- UK CD single (1991)
1. "People Are People" – 3:43
2. "In Your Memory" – 4:01
3. "People Are People" (Different Mix) – 7:11
4. "In Your Memory" (Slik Mix) – 8:12

== Charts ==
=== Weekly charts ===
1984–1985 weekly chart performance for "People Are People"
Chart (1984–1985)	Peak position
Australia (Kent Music Report)	25
Austria (Ö3 Austria Top 40)	6
Belgium (Ultratop 50 Flanders)	3
Canada Top Singles (RPM)	15
Europe (European Top 100 Singles)	4
Ireland (IRMA)	2
Netherlands (Dutch Top 40)	10
Netherlands (Single Top 100)	8
Norway (VG-lista)	10
South Africa (Springbok Radio)	23
Sweden (Sverigetopplistan)	15
Switzerland (Schweizer Hitparade)	4
UK Singles (Official Charts)	4
UK Indie (MRIB)	1
US Billboard Hot 100	13
US Dance Club Songs (Billboard)	44
US Dance Singles Sales (Billboard)	44
US Cash Box Top 100 Singles	16
West Germany (GfK)	1

2013 weekly chart performance for "People Are People"
Chart (2013)	Peak position
France (SNEP)	155

=== Year-end charts ===
Year-end chart performance for "People Are People"
Chart (1984)	Position
Australia (Kent Music Report)	116
Belgium (Ultratop 50 Flanders)	50
Netherlands (Dutch Top 40)	84
Netherlands (Single Top 100)	66
UK Singles (Gallup)	80
West Germany (Official German Charts)	12

== Certifications ==
Certifications for "People Are People"
Region	Certification	Certified units/sales
United Kingdom (BPI)	Silver	250,000^{^}
United States (RIAA)	Gold	500,000^{‡}
^{^} Shipments figures based on certification alone.^{‡} Sales+streaming figures based on certification alone.

== RuPaul version ==
"People Are People"

Single by RuPaul

from the album Red Hot
- Released: 26 January 2006
- Recorded: 2004
- Genre: Dance
- Label: RuCo
- Songwriter: Martin L. Gore
- Producers: RuPaul; Tom Trujillo

RuPaul singles chronology
"WorkOut" (2005)	"People Are People" (2006)	"SuperModel (You Better Work)" (The RuMixes) (2006)

American drag queen RuPaul covered "People Are People" in 2004 for his fourth studio album, Red Hot. His version, which features Tom Trujillo, was released as a retail single on 26 January 2006 to promote the remix album ReWorked. It peaked at number 10 on the Billboard Hot Dance Club Play chart.

=== Track listing ===
- CD single
1. "People Are People" (Craig C. Radio) – 4:42
2. "People Are People" (Giuseppe D's Rutroactive Club) – 8:20
3. "The Price of One" (Craig C. Ru Edit) – 6:43
4. "People Are People" (Craig C. Main Vocal) – 8:01
5. "The Price of One" (Craig C.'s Mo' Trippin' Dub) – 10:02
6. "People Are People" (Goodandevil) – 3:42
7. "People Are People" (DJ Record Player's SSSnakin' Breakin') – 7:11
8. "The Price of One" (Craig C.'s Mo' Trippin' Beats) – 2:41
9. "People Are People" (Craig C. Dub) – 8:01
10. "I Just Can't Wait" (Till Christmas) – 2:42

=== Charts ===
Chart performance for "People Are People"
Chart (2006)	Peak position
US Dance Club Songs (Billboard)	10

== See also ==
- List of number-one hits of 1984 (Germany)
