= Blasphemous Rumours / Somebody =

"Blasphemous Rumours" / "Somebody"

Single by Depeche Mode

from the album Some Great Reward
- Released: 29 October 1984
- Recorded: June 1984
- Studio: Music Works (Highbury, London); Hansa Studios (Berlin)
- Genre: New wave
- Length: "Blasphemous Rumours": 5:06 (single version); 6:20 (12″/album version); "Somebody": 4:19 (remix); 4:27 (album version)
- Label: Mute
- Songwriter: Martin L. Gore
- Producers: Depeche Mode; Daniel Miller; Gareth Jones

Depeche Mode singles chronology
"Master and Servant" (1984)	"Blasphemous Rumours" / "Somebody" (1984)	"Shake the Disease" (1985)

Music videos
- "Blasphemous Rumours" on YouTube
- "Somebody" on YouTube

Professional ratings
Review scores
Source	Rating
AllMusic	4.5/5 stars

"Blasphemous Rumours" / "Somebody" is a single by the English electronic band Depeche Mode. It was released on 29 October 1984, as the third single from their 1984 album Some Great Reward and their twelfth UK single overall.

Concerned about potential controversy due to the religious theme of the song, "Blasphemous Rumours" was released as a double A-side single with "Somebody"; it was a top 20 hit in the UK.

== Background ==
Both "Blasphemous Rumours" and "Somebody" are tracks from Depeche Mode's 1984 album Some Great Reward, recorded in late 1983 through mid-1984 at Music Works in London and Hansa Studios in West Germany.

== Controversy ==
Depeche Mode had released their previous single, "Master and Servant", to mild controversy due to its sexual theme. BBC Radio had considered, but did not, ban "Master and Servant" from radio airplay, and were still concerned about radio censorship following the blowback from their censoring Frankie Goes to Hollywood's song "Relax" a few months before the "Blasphemous Rumours" / "Somebody" single was released. Wary of growing pushback from British press and clergy, Mute decided to release "Blasphemous Rumours" on Depeche Mode's first-ever double-A side release, paired with "Somebody". Band member Andy Fletcher later said, "we wouldn't say our songs are controversial. They do cause controversy, but Martin [Gore] would say all he does is write about life."

== "Blasphemous Rumours" ==
The song stems from the times that Martin Gore would go with bandmate Andy Fletcher and former bandmate Vince Clarke to the church. When Gore initially showed Fletcher the song, he found it quite offensive. Gore describes the song's meaning:

"I was going to church a lot at the time, not because I believed in it, but because there was nothing else to do on a Sunday. I found the service very hard to take seriously. The whole setup is quite handy but I'm not sure that's what God intended. Particularly a part of the service called the prayer list, when the preacher rattles off the names of those sick and about to die. The person at the top of the list was guaranteed to die, but still everyone went right ahead thanking God for carrying out his will. It just seemed so strange to me, so ridiculous and so removed from real experiences."

Singer Dave Gahan said,

"I'm by the way not anti-religious at all! I only oppose a certain kind of religion that was forced upon me when I was young. My mother was in the Salvation Army. So she sent me to the church every Sunday till my 18th birthday. Together with my sister, we usually went for a ride with the bike and told mum afterwards how lovely the homily was. The song only wants to say that no one should let someone force anything upon him. Whether it's politics or something else, that doesn't matter. You have to choose yourself what you wanna do with your life. And dare to take risks."

According to Jonathan Miller's biography Stripped: The True Story of Depeche Mode, the song includes a "cunningly disguised" 16-bar instrumental rendition of the hymn "Jesus' Love Is Very Wonderful". Billboard later described the song as drawing on early Industrial music, with its "distinct, heavy percussion samples" and said it brought a "harsh sound to the mainstream world half a decade before Trent Reznor and Nine Inch Nails."

== "Somebody" ==
"Somebody", which was sung by Gore in the studio in the nude, includes one of Gore's "little twists", where the song builds as if it is a song about finding your perfect love, only to have him reveal at the end "though things like this make me sick / in a case like this I'll get away with it." Gore added this because "I simply can't write your conventional pop fare. A pleasant song to me is unfinished, it isn't telling the full story. Which is why I introduced the twist at the end of 'Somebody' because the song was just too nice. You say I'm cynical about love in my songs and perhaps I am but I think that's an interesting angle. Otherwise you just become mundane like most chart music. Relationships do have their darker side and I like to write about it."

== Release and promotion ==
The single was released on 29 October 1984 by Mute Records in the UK, and Intercord records in Germany. In the UK, there were two 7" vinyl releases, the first of which included only the two songs, and the second of which was an extended play 7" that also contained live tracks recorded during the then-underway Some Great Reward Tour. The 12" release included additional live tracks recorded from the same performance. Catalogue numbers were 7BONG7, 7BONG7E and 12BONG7, respectively. In Germany, the same releases were given catalogue numbers INT 111.824 regardless of the release format. The live tracks were recorded just a month before the single's release, on 29 September 1984 at Liverpool Empire Theatre. The single represented the first double A-side single for Depeche Mode. "Blasphemous Rumours" was later included on Greenpeace – The Album (1985).

Videos for both "Blasphemous Rumours" and "Somebody" were directed by Clive Richardson.

In 2017, "Blasphemous Rumours" was included on Billboard's list of their top 20 Depeche Mode songs.

== Later releases and performances ==
"Blasphemous Rumours" was included on later compilation albums including The Singles 81→85 (1985), Catching Up with Depeche Mode (1985) and Greatest Hits (1987). "Somebody" appeared on Catching Up with Depeche Mode.

Live performances of "Blasphemous Rumours" and "Somebody" both appeared on The World We Live In and Live in Hamburg (1985) and 101 (1989).

The videos for "Blasphemous Rumours" and "Somebody" appeared on later video collections included Some Great Videos (1985) and Video Singles Collection (2016).

During the 2009–10 Tour of the Universe at the Royal Albert Hall, Alan Wilder, who had left Depeche Mode in 1995, made a surprise appearance on stage by playing the piano while Gore sang "Somebody".

== Track listings ==
All tracks written by Martin L. Gore, except "Ice Machine", written by Vince Clarke, and "Two Minute Warning", written by Alan Wilder

=== 7″: Mute / 7Bong7 (UK) ===
1. "Blasphemous Rumours" – 5:06
2. "Somebody" (remix) – 4:19

=== 7″ EP: Mute / 7Bong7E (UK) ===
1. "Somebody" (remix) – 4:19
2. "Everything Counts" (live) – 5:53
3. "Blasphemous Rumours" – 5:06
4. "Told You So" (live version) – 4:54

=== 12″: Mute / 12Bong7 (UK) ===
1. "Blasphemous Rumours" – 6:20
2. "Somebody" (live) – 4:26
3. "Two Minute Warning" (live) – 4:36
4. "Ice Machine" (live) – 3:45
5. "Everything Counts" (live) – 5:53

=== CD: Mute / CDBong7 (UK) ===
1. "Blasphemous Rumours" – 6:20
2. "Told You So" (live) – 4:56
3. "Somebody" (remix) – 4:19
4. "Everything Counts" (live) – 5:53
- The CD single was released in 1991 as part of the singles box set compilations.

== Charts ==
Chart performance for "Blasphemous Rumours" / "Somebody"
Chart (1984–1985)	Peak position
Belgium (Ultratop 50 Flanders)	24
Ireland (IRMA)	8
Netherlands (Dutch Top 40) "Somebody"	27
Netherlands (Single Top 100)	34
Switzerland (Schweizer Hitparade)	19
UK Singles (Official Charts)	16
West Germany (GfK)	22
