= 101 (album and film) =

1989 live album and documentary film by Depeche Mode

Live album by Depeche Mode
- Released: 13 March 1989
- Recorded: 18 June 1988
- Venue: Rose Bowl (Pasadena, California)
- Length: 95:45
- Label: Mute
- Producer: Depeche Mode

Depeche Mode chronology
Music for the Masses (1987)	101 (1989)	Violator (1990)

Singles from 101
- 1. "Everything Counts" Released: 13 February 1989

101

Video by Depeche Mode
- Released: 13 March 1989
- Recorded: 18 June 1988
- Venue: Rose Bowl (Pasadena, California)
- Length: 117:00
- Label: Mute Film
- Directors: David Dawkins; Chris Hegedus; D. A. Pennebaker
- Producer: Frazer Pennebaker

Depeche Mode chronology
Strange (1988)	101 (1989)	Strange Too (1990)

Professional ratings
Review scores
Source	Rating
AllMusic	4/5 stars
CD Review	5/10 & 6/10
The Encyclopedia of Popular Music	2/5 stars
Rolling Stone	4/5 stars
The Rolling Stone Album Guide	3.5/5 stars

101 is a live album and documentary film by the English electronic music band Depeche Mode, released on 13 March 1989 by Mute Records. It chronicles the final leg of the band's tour in support of their album Music for the Masses (1987) and the final show on 18 June 1988 at the Rose Bowl in Pasadena, California.

The show was the 101st and final performance of the tour and coincidentally also the number of a famous highway in the area. The film was directed and produced by D. A. Pennebaker.

== Background ==
Depeche Mode had released their previous album, Music for the Masses in September 1987 and had followed up with the successful Music for the Masses Tour, which ran through June 1988. The tour had a US leg in December 1987, and when a second US leg was scheduled between April and June 1988, the band decided to document the leg and cap off the tour with a special show. Singer Dave Gahan told press in interviews that the band wanted a video that reflected the highs and lows of spending 10 months on the road for a tour. Said Gahan, "We didn't want to make a run-of-the-mill 'band on stage' type of film that's been done [by others] so many times. ... We wanted to make an honest film about what it's really like," and show the backstage disagreements, discussions, and the fans.

== Venue ==
The band wanted to finish their successful tour with a large, final show. Their initial idea was to do a free concert somewhere, but that idea was quickly abandoned. When the Rose Bowl was suggested, it was met with scepticism by the band's US label Sire Records, who were concerned that, because the venue was so large, it wouldn't sell out, and if it didn't sell out, it would suggest that the band's growing success was fraudulent. In addition, the label was concerned because they thought that the venue hadn't been used to host a concert since the 1970's, although it had in fact been host to a musical event just six years earlier, when a concert was held there with performers including Stevie Wonder, Aretha Franklin, Quincy Jones and Luther Vandross.

== Documentary ==
The band's original concept for the film was going to be about how Depeche Mode fit into the 1980s. They began discussions amongst themselves about the film in March 1988, before the second leg of the US tour began. After discussions with an experienced but unnamed director, they came to the conclusion that their original choice was going to do something "too glossy" for their tastes, as they were not looking for a "slick commercial" for the band. At this point, Virgin Records, who were handling video releases for Mute Records, suggested that they reach out to renowned documentary filmmaker D. A. Pennebaker to see if he would be interested in the project. He accepted, but discarded their initial concept, feeling that it was "impossible to examine in an entertainingly cinematic fashion".

Ultimately, the film focused on what Depeche Mode considered to be their strongest selling point, their live performance, as well as capturing the spirit of their fan base. Notably, the film prominently features a group of young fans travelling across America as winners of a "be-in-a-Depeche Mode-movie-contest". Their bus visited New York, Pittsburgh, Nashville, Memphis, New Mexico and Arizona on its way to LA, where the movie culminates at the band's landmark concert at the Rose Bowl stadium in Pasadena. Depeche Mode had noticed that in America, they often sold more concert tickets than albums.

The film features performances at the Rose Bowl concert, interspersed with snippets of the band, the "bus kids" and live performances recorded throughout the tour. The 2003 DVD reissue included more concert footage, but as Pennebaker was "shooting a documentary, not a concert film", a complete video record of the Rose Bowl concert does not exist. Pennebaker noted there was a similarity between Depeche Mode and some of the other artists he'd filmed before, including Bob Dylan and David Bowie, saying "I found the audience very rapt; they were there for that band. Not any band would do. I got the feeling that maybe there was no other band they'd ever go out for again in that assemblage, and it made me take that audience fairly seriously."

During the tour, Gahan was not faithful to his wife, later saying, "I felt like shit because I constantly cheated on my wife. I went home and lied, my soul needed cleansing badly." On the tour, Gahan started a relationship with Teresa Conroy, the US Press Liaison Officer for the band, whom he would later marry in 1992. However, none of this was captured on film, according to band member Alan Wilder, "we never really allowed Don Pennebaker to see the darker side of being on the road."

=== Style ===
Pennebaker used his direct cinema approach, which he described as "letting the camera run as unobtrusively as possible, thereby encouraging events to unfold on their own. [...] You edit more and the film changes every three days, but [the band] were very nice and patient about it."

== Live album ==
Although the entire Rose Bowl concert was not recorded on video, the complete concert was recorded for an audio release. Mixed at Swanyard Studios in London by then-unknown producer Alan Moulder, 101 was Depeche Mode's first full live album. (Note: Their first concert video was The World We Live In and Live in Hamburg (1985), although no corresponding live album was ever released, and fragments of their 1982 tour were released as B-sides to several of their 1983 singles.) Wilder said that the album had a few overdubs, saying "I doubt there's ever been a live album in the history of pop music that hasn't been touched up here and there."

== Name ==
The original name for the live album/documentary was going to be Mass, inspired by both the name of album it supported and the large crowds who were coming to the concerts. Said Gahan, the name 'Mass' felt appropriate because "there's something that is very religious about the whole thing [performing live to a large crowd], and it's not just from the fans to the band, it's the other way as well. You definitely feel a massive energy from all the people who are out there. ... There's an incredible energy that none of us understand."

Another name they considered was A Brief Period of Rejoicing, named after the Winston Churchill quote that opened their album Black Celebration (1986). However, they ultimately chose the name that Wilder proposed, 101, named after both the fact that the final show was the 101st of the tour, and the nearby 101 highway.

== The final show ==
We'd like to announce that as a special final concert for our world tour, on Saturday June the 18th, we'll be playing a Concert for the Masses here at the Rose Bowl Pasadena.

— Alan Wilder on behalf of Depeche Mode, announcing the show to the press and fans in June 1988.

For the final show, the band had to use a completely different sound system and stage setup than had been used on the rest of the tour. The roof of the stage was too heavy for the existing rigging system, a fact that was not discovered until they tried to raise the roof after attaching all of the lights and speakers. This resulted in the band and management racing to rent a crane on the day of the show, to help lift and hold the roof in place. The band remembered that everything about the soundcheck for the show "felt disjointed and weird", everyone was nervous, and Gahan started to lose his voice at the soundcheck, but fortunately was able to perform that night.

Fellow synth-pop bands Pet Shop Boys, Orchestral Manoeuvres in the Dark, Thomas Dolby and Wire were opening guests for the show.

Depeche Mode's set went on without any major issues, other than the weather. Said songwriter Martin Gore, "we've joked about the cloud of doom that followed us around ... Every time we played anywhere, it rained" and this was no exception, with a rainstorm starting coincidentally during the religiously-themed "Blasphemous Rumours".

One of the highlights of the show was the crowd waving in unison with Gahan during their performance of "Never Let Me Down Again", which the band thought looked like a field of wheat waving in the wind. This final show of the tour was the last time the band played their 1984 hit "People Are People" live. Although the song was popular and a catalyst for the band's success in the years leading up to the show, the band felt that the song was too commercial and their dislike for the song had grown to the point where they didn't want to perform it in concert anymore.

Gahan said that near the end of the show, he started getting so emotional that he had trouble singing. After the show, Gahan visibly broke down backstage. He later said "I had a strange feeling at that concert, I remember at the end of it, I felt like it was all over. There was nowhere to go now. ... What were we going to do now? It was almost like we had reached our destination." In 2006, nearly 20 years after the concert, Gahan said that, despite all the band's success in the years since, "There hasn't really been another concert like it, for us."

A review in the Los Angeles Daily News was mostly positive, saying "it was the music that was most enticing. Though the band's somber disco at times seemed downright narcotic, their elegant Germanic-Mediterranean melodies were more often seductive."

=== Attendance and ticket and merchandise sales ===
Reports of the total attendance at the show vary, but all agree it was at least 60,000: In the 101 video itself, paid attendance was listed as 60,453, Gahan and label manager Daniel Miller quoted 70,000 or 80,000 in interviews in later years, contemporary reviews in Q and Rolling Stone magazines cite figures of 72,000 and 75,000, respectively, and the liner notes for the 2006 special edition re-release of Music for the Masses cites the attendance as "almost 80,000". The paid attendance gross for the show, as reported in the 101 video, was about USD $1,360,000, or roughly $3.7 million in today's dollars. The Q review also notes the band sold at least $1,000,000 in t-shirt sales alone at the show. Said Gahan, "things like merchandising are far more important than ticket sales. Merchandise finances tours. ... To tour in America you need to sell T-shirts."

== Release ==
=== Video ===
The 101 video was released on 13 March 1989 by Mute Records in the UK and Sire Records in the US. In the UK, the release was given catalogue number VVD469. The video was released on DVD for the first time in 2003, and again on blu-ray with additional content and upgraded 4k video in 2021. The video was Rated 'R' due to strong language.

=== Live album ===
101 was released on 13 March 1989 by Mute Records in the UK and Sire Records in the US, and was assigned catalogue number STUMM101 in the UK. Upon its release, the live album charted higher than Music for the Masses had in the UK, coming in at number 5.

The release included a booklet with pictures taken by Anton Corbijn of the band, show, fans, and merchandise. The album was supported with the single release of "Everything Counts (Live)" on vinyl, released on 13 February 1989. A promotional-only 7" of the live version of "Pleasure, Little Treasure" was released by Virgin Records in Spain with catalogue number SA1246.

=== Reviews ===
A review in The Seattle Times said "Sometimes the film feels like satiric expose, a la Decline of Western Civilization Part II: The Metal Years. Sometimes it feels like honest homage to a band that sells 60,000 seats and earns a cool million in a single night on the basis of a cache of catchy, sometimes sumptuous, minor-key ditties", adding that "fans may want more music".

== Legacy ==
Due to the prominence of the "bus kids" in the film, it is widely considered to be the impetus for the "reality" craze that swept MTV in the following years, including The Real World and Road Rules.

In various interviews, DVD commentaries and on their own website, both Pennebaker and collaborator Chris Hegedus have cited 101 as "their favourite" and "the one that was the most fun to make" out of all their films to date.

== Track listing ==
All tracks are written by Martin L. Gore, except "Just Can't Get Enough", written by Vince Clarke.

=== LP and cassette ===
Side 1

1. "Pimpf" – 0:58
2. "Behind the Wheel" – 5:55
3. "Strangelove" – 4:49
4. "Something to Do" – 3:54
5. "Blasphemous Rumours" – 5:09

Side 2

1. "Stripped" – 6:45
2. "Somebody" – 4:34
3. "The Things You Said" – 4:21
4. "Black Celebration" – 4:54

Side 3

1. "Shake the Disease" – 5:10
2. "Pleasure Little Treasure" – 4:38
3. "People Are People" – 4:59
4. "A Question of Time" – 4:12

Side 4

1. "Never Let Me Down Again" – 6:40
2. "Master and Servant" – 4:30
3. "Just Can't Get Enough" – 4:01
4. "Everything Counts" – 6:31

=== CD ===
==== Disc 1 ====
1. "Pimpf" – 0:58
2. "Behind the Wheel" – 5:55
3. "Strangelove" – 4:49
4. "Sacred" – 5:09
5. "Something to Do" – 3:54
6. "Blasphemous Rumours" – 5:09
7. "Stripped" – 6:45
8. "Somebody" – 4:34
9. "The Things You Said" – 4:21

==== Disc 2 ====
1. "Black Celebration" – 4:54
2. "Shake the Disease" – 5:10
3. "Nothing" – 4:36
4. "Pleasure Little Treasure" – 4:38
5. "People Are People" – 4:59
6. "A Question of Time" – 4:12
7. "Never Let Me Down Again" – 6:40
8. "A Question of Lust" – 4:07
9. "Master and Servant" – 4:30
10. "Just Can't Get Enough" – 4:01
11. "Everything Counts" – 6:27

=== SACD ===
Disc 1

1. "Pimpf" – 0:58
2. "Behind the Wheel" – 5:55
3. "Strangelove" – 4:49
4. "Sacred" – 5:09
5. "Something to Do" – 3:54
6. "Blasphemous Rumours" – 5:09
7. "Stripped" – 6:45
8. "Somebody" – 4:34
9. "The Things You Said" – 4:21

Disc 2

1. "Black Celebration" – 4:54
2. "Shake the Disease" – 5:10
3. "Nothing" – 4:36
4. "Pleasure Little Treasure" – 4:38
5. "People Are People" – 4:59
6. "A Question of Time" – 4:12
7. "Never Let Me Down Again" – 6:40
8. "A Question of Lust" – 4:07
9. "Master and Servant" – 4:30
10. "Just Can't Get Enough" – 4:01
11. "Everything Counts" – 6:31
12. "Pimpf" (full version) (multi-channel SACD only)

- Audio available in three formats: two-channel CD, two-channel SACD, multi-channel SACD

=== VHS ===
1. "101 – The Movie" – 117:00

=== DVD ===
Disc one

1. 101 – The Movie (includes optional audio commentary with filmmakers D.A. Pennebaker and Chris Hegedus, and bandmembers Dave Gahan, Martin Gore, and Andy Fletcher)

Disc two
All songs are isolated live video footage, uninterrupted by documentary footage. Songs with a * are exclusive to the DVD and were not in the VHS film. Footage of "Sacred", "Something To Do", and "A Question of Lust" were lost and not able to be recovered for the DVD, though they were eventually found and restored in 4K for the Blu-ray release in 2021.

1. "Master and Servant"
2. "Pimpf"
3. "Behind the Wheel"
4. "Strangelove"
5. "Blasphemous Rumours"
6. "Stripped"
7. "Somebody"*
8. "Black Celebration"
9. "Pleasure, Little Treasure"*
10. "Just Can't Get Enough"
11. "Everything Counts"
12. "Never Let Me Down Again"

Extras:

- Interview
1. Dave Gahan
2. Martin Gore
3. Andrew Fletcher
4. Jonathan Kessler
5. Daniel Miller
6. Christopher Hardwick
7. Oliver Chesler
8. Jay Serken
- "Everything Counts (live)" (music video)

=== Blu-ray ===
101 – The Movie

1. 101 – The Movie (4K restoration from original 16mm film elements)

Rose Bowl Concert (uninterrupted by documentary footage, also restored in 4K)

1. "Master and Servant"
2. "Pimpf"
3. "Behind the Wheel"
4. "Strangelove"
5. "Blasphemous Rumours"
6. "Stripped"
7. "Somebody"*
8. "Black Celebration"
9. "Pleasure, Little Treasure"*
10. "Just Can't Get Enough"
11. "Everything Counts"
12. "Never Let Me Down Again"

Bonus Videos (all restored in 4K)

- "Everything Counts (live)" (music video)
- "A Question of Lust" bonus performance
- "Sacred" bonus performance
- "Something to Do" bonus performance

The limited edition Blu-ray set also includes:

- The two-disc DVD with its additional extras (the commentary and interviews)
- 48-page behind-the-scenes story of the day photo book
- 20" × 30" replica of original US theatrical release film poster
- 16-page Anton Corbijn Photo Mode book as featured in the original album release
- Download card to access the HD download of the film and the 24-bit audio files of the 101 concert release

== Personnel ==
Credits adapted from the liner notes of 101.

- Randy Ezratty – recording
- Mark Shane – recording assistance
- John Harris – recording assistance
- Billy Yodelman – recording assistance
- Alan Moulder – engineering
- Depeche Mode – production
- Anton Corbijn – cover
- Paul West – cover

== Charts ==
=== Weekly charts ===
Weekly chart performance for 101 (album)
Chart (1989)	Peak position
Australian Albums (ARIA)	71
Austrian Albums (Ö3 Austria)	13
Belgian Albums (IFPI)	3
Canada Top Albums/CDs (RPM)	16
Dutch Albums (Album Top 100)	43
European Albums (Music & Media)	6
Finnish Albums (Suomen virallinen lista)	14
French Albums (IFOP)	4
German Albums (Offizielle Top 100)	3
Italian Albums (Musica e dischi)	7
Japanese Albums (Oricon)	76
Spanish Albums (AFYVE)	8
Swedish Albums (Sverigetopplistan)	14
Swiss Albums (Schweizer Hitparade)	11
UK Albums (Official Charts)	5
UK Independent Albums (MRIB)	2
US Billboard 200	45

Weekly chart performance for 101 (video)
Chart (2003)	Peak position
Swedish Music DVD (Sverigetopplistan)	7
UK Music Videos (Official Charts)	17

=== Year-end charts ===
Year-end chart performance for 101 (album)
Chart (1989)	Position
Canada Top Albums/CDs (RPM)	90
European Albums (Music & Media)	30
German Albums (Offizielle Top 100)	54

Year-end chart performance for 101 (video)
Chart (2003)	Position
Swedish Music DVD (Sverigetopplistan)	64

== Certifications ==
Certifications for 101 (album)
Region	Certification	Certified units/sales
Canada (Music Canada)	2× Platinum	200,000^{^}
France (SNEP)	2× Gold	200,000^{*}
Germany (BVMI)	Gold	250,000^{^}
Spain (Promusicae)	Gold	50,000^{^}
United Kingdom (BPI)	Gold	100,000^{‡}
United States (RIAA)	Gold	250,000^{^}
^{*} Sales figures based on certification alone.^{^} Shipments figures based on certification alone.^{‡} Sales+streaming figures based on certification alone.

Certifications for 101 (video)
Region	Certification	Certified units/sales
France (SNEP)	Platinum	20,000^{*}
Germany (BVMI)	Gold	25,000^{^}
Poland (ZPAV)	Platinum	10,000^{*}
Spain (Promusicae)	Gold	10,000^{^}
United States (RIAA)	Platinum	100,000^{^}
^{*} Sales figures based on certification alone.^{^} Shipments figures based on certification alone.
