= Catching Up with Depeche Mode =

1985 compilation album by Depeche Mode

Compilation album by Depeche Mode
- Released: 11 November 1985
- Recorded: December 1980 – July 1985
- Length: 51:59
- Label: Sire
- Producers: Depeche Mode; Daniel Miller; Gareth Jones

Depeche Mode chronology
The Singles 81→85 (1985)	Catching Up with Depeche Mode (1985)	Black Celebration (1986)

Catching Up with Depeche Mode is a compilation album by the English electronic music band Depeche Mode, released solely in North America on 11 November 1985 by Sire Records. It reached number 113 on the Billboard Top 200 Pop album chart, and was certified Platinum by the Recording Industry Association of America (RIAA) 15 years after its release.

== Background ==
Depeche Mode had released their last studio album, Some Great Reward in September 1984 and by the end of that year, they already knew that they would not record a new album in 1985, and instead focus on a singles collection to be released instead. News of the impending compilation started rumours that the band was going to break up which the band had to refute in the press. To support the collection, Depeche Mode went into the studio twice in 1985 to record new singles to be included in the collection; once in February to record "Shake the Disease" and again in June to record "It's Called a Heart".

In the UK, October 1985 saw the international release of the album The Singles 81→85, which collected the band's seven-inch singles to that date. However, US label Sire Records had released the compilation album People Are People in 1984 to help boost the popularity of the band in the US when their previous album, Construction Time Again had failed to chart there. Not wanting to release another compilation album with many of the same tracks, Sire Records instead modified the track listing from the UK release to avoid any repetition with People Are People and instead added a few of the band's songs that had not been released in the US yet.

== Release ==
Catching Up with Depeche Mode was released by Sire Records in the US in November 1985 with catalogue number 1-25346. The release peaked at number 113 on the US Billboard Top Pop Albums chart. On 2 August 2000, the album was certified Platinum by the RIAA.

=== Artwork ===
Except for the 1984 compilation People Are People, pictures of the band had not appeared on the cover of their previous albums. The cover image, taken by photographer by Eric Watson, was also used on the cover of the band's first video compilation, Some Great Videos (1985). The image was also later displayed at the National Portrait Gallery in London.

Professional ratings
Review scores
Source	Rating
AllMusic	4.5/5 stars
Robert Christgau	B+
The Encyclopedia of Popular Music	4/5 stars
The Rolling Stone Album Guide	4.5/5 stars

== Track listing ==
All tracks are written by Martin L. Gore, except where noted. All tracks are produced by Daniel Miller and Depeche Mode, except where noted.

No.	Title	Writer(s)	Original album	Length
1.	"Dreaming of Me"	Vince Clarke	Non-album single (UK) / Speak & Spell (US)	3:44
2.	"New Life"	Clarke	Speak & Spell	3:44
3.	"Just Can't Get Enough"	Clarke	Speak & Spell	3:36
4.	"See You"		A Broken Frame	3:53
5.	"The Meaning of Love"		A Broken Frame	3:04
6.	"Love, in Itself"		Construction Time Again	3:55
7.	"Master and Servant" (producers: Miller, Depeche Mode, Gareth Jones)		Some Great Reward	3:50
8.	"Blasphemous Rumours" (producers: Miller, Depeche Mode, Jones)		Some Great Reward	5:04
9.	"Somebody" (producers: Miller, Depeche Mode, Jones)		Some Great Reward	4:21
10.	"Shake the Disease" (producers: Miller, Depeche Mode, Jones)		Non-album single	4:46
11.	"Flexible" (producers: Miller, Depeche Mode, Jones)		Shake the Disease B-side	3:09
12.	"It's Called a Heart"		Non-album single	3:48
13.	"Fly on the Windscreen"		It's Called a Heart B-side	5:05
Total length:				51:59

== Personnel ==
Credits adapted from the liner notes of Catching Up with Depeche Mode.

- Daniel Miller – production (all tracks)
- Depeche Mode – production (all tracks)
- Gareth Jones – production (tracks 7–11, 13)
- Eric Watson – front cover photography
- Martyn Atkins – design, photo treatment
- Mark Higenbottam – design, photo treatment
- David A. Jones – design, photo treatment

== Charts ==
Chart (1986)	Peak position
US Billboard 200	113

== Certifications ==
Region	Certification	Certified units/sales
United States (RIAA)	Platinum	1,000,000^{^}
^{^} Shipments figures based on certification alone.
