= Shake the Disease =

1985 single by Depeche Mode

- Cover artwork by Tamara Capellaro

Single by Depeche Mode

from the album The Singles 81→85
- B-side: "Flexible"
- Released: 29 April 1985
- Recorded: February 1985
- Studio: Hansa Mischraum (Berlin)
- Genre: Synth-pop; dark wave
- Length: 4:49
- Label: Mute
- Songwriter: Martin L. Gore
- Producers: Daniel Miller; Depeche Mode; Gareth Jones

Depeche Mode singles chronology
"Blasphemous Rumours / Somebody" (1984)	"Shake the Disease" (1985)	"It's Called a Heart" (1985)

Music video
- "Shake the Disease" on YouTube

"Shake the Disease" is a song by English electronic music band Depeche Mode, released as a single on 29 April 1985 and intended for inclusion on two of their 1985 compilation albums, The Singles 81→85 and Catching Up with Depeche Mode.

== Background ==
Depeche Mode had finished 1984 riding relative success, and had live performance commitments in March, April and July of 1985. At the end of 1984, they knew they would be releasing a singles collection in 1985 instead of releasing an all new album, and as such went into Hansa Studios in West Germany in February 1985 to record a new single.

Band member Alan Wilder felt this song captured the essence of the band, saying that "there's a certain edge to what we do that can make people think twice about things. If we've got a choice between calling a song 'Understand Me' or 'Shake the Disease', we'll call it 'Shake the Disease'. There's a lot of perversity and innuendo in our lyrics, but nothing direct." Described at the time as one of the band's favorite of their entire repertoire, the production also saw the rise of some of the tensions between the band and their longtime producer Daniel Miller. Said Wilder, Miller knew the song was good, but tried too hard to make it sound special, saying of one particular simple sound, he "ended up using 24 sounds layered on top of each other – every sound in the orchestra! These, of course, all then cancelled each other out, and the end result sounded like a sine wave! That epitomised how far up your arse you could go."

== Release and promotion ==
Released on 29 April 1985, "Shake the Disease" reached number 18 on the UK Singles Chart, while charting within the top 10 in Ireland, Sweden, Switzerland and West Germany. In France, it peaked at number 13, spending six months in the top 50. The track also reached number 33 on the Hot Dance/Disco 12 Inch Singles Sales chart in the United States. It reached number one on the KROQ Top 106.7 Countdown of 1985.

In the UK, Mute Records released the single on 7", 12" and limited 12" vinyl releases, with catalogue numbers 7BONG8, 12BONG8 and L12BONG8, respectively. The single's B-side, "Flexible", was remixed by Flood and Miller. The limited edition remix was done by John Fryer. In West Germany, Intercord Records released the singles (catalogue numbers INT 111.827, INT 126.828 and INT 126.829, respectively), and first editions were pressed in red vinyl (7") and marbled grey vinyl (12").

"Shake the Disease" was included on Depeche Mode's two "greatest hits" albums, The Singles 81→85, which was released in the UK, and Catching Up with Depeche Mode, which was released in the US.

Depeche Mode performed "Shake the Disease" on the West German TV show Peter Illmanns Treff (P.I.T.) on 15 May 1985.

In 2017, Billboard magazine included "Shake the Disease" on their list of Top 20 Depeche Mode songs, coming in at number 10.

=== Music video ===
The music video is the first Depeche Mode video directed by Peter Care, and features a camera trick that makes the band members appear to slowly tip over. It was shot in the Docklands area of London, prominently featuring the cranes that were still on site at that time. Between May and July 1985 the video was performed on 10 television programs across Europe.

The video was later released on Some Great Videos (1985), The Best of Depeche Mode Volume 1 (2006) and Video Singles Collection (2016).

=== Later releases ===
The original studio version or remixes of the song appear on later compilation albums including Greatest Hits (1987), and The Best of Depeche Mode Volume 1 (2006).

Live versions of "Shake the Disease" appeared on 101 (1989), Touring the Angel: Live in Milan (2006), Recording the Angel (2006), and on some releases of Recording the Universe (2009–2010).

== Reception ==
AllMusic reviewer Dave Thompson praised the song, saying, "with its plump melody and stirring refrain, it's a haunting and soulful number that deserved better than its #18 chart position."

== Track listings ==
All tracks are written by Martin L. Gore

- 7-inch single

A. "Shake the Disease" – 4:48
B. "Flexible" – 3:11

- US and Canadian 7-inch single

A. "Shake the Disease" (fade) – 3:59
B. "Flexible" – 3:09

- 12-inch single

A. "Shake the Disease" (remixed extended version) – 8:44 (engineered by Flood)
B. "Flexible" (remixed extended version) – 6:15 (engineered by Flood)

- 12-inch single (special edition)
- French and Italian cassette maxi single

A1. "Shake the Disease" (Edit the Shake) – 7:10
A2. "Master and Servant" (live) – 5:37
B1. "Flexible" (Pre-Deportation mix) – 4:40 (remixed by Bert Bevans)
B2. "Something to Do" (Metalmix) – 7:26 (remixed by Gareth Jones)

"Master and Servant" was recorded at the Basel, Switzerland, show on 30 November 1984.

- 1988 French CD single
1. "Shake the Disease" (Edit the Shake) – 7:10
2. "Master and Servant" (live) – 5:37
3. "Flexible" (Pre-Deportation mix) – 4:39 (remixed by Bert Bevans)
4. "Something to Do" (Metalmix) – 7:26 (remixed by Gareth Jones)
5. "Shake the Disease" (7″ mix) – 4:49
- 1990 Belgian and German CD single
1. "Shake the Disease" (Edit the Shake) – 7:09
2. "Master and Servant" (live) – 5:38
3. "Flexible" (Pre-Deportation mix) – 4:40 (remixed by Bert Bevans)
4. "Something to Do" (Metalmix) – 7:25 (remixed by Gareth Jones)
- 1991 CD single
1. "Shake the Disease" – 4:47
2. "Flexible" – 3:10
3. "Shake the Disease" (remixed extended) – 8:45
4. "Flexible" (remixed extended) – 6:16
5. "Shake the Disease" (Edit the Shake) – 7:10
6. "Something to Do" (Metalmix) – 7:27

The UK CD single was also released as part of the 3 (Singles 13–18) box set compilations.

== Charts ==
=== Weekly charts ===
Weekly chart performance for "Shake the Disease"
Chart (1985)	Peak position
Belgium (Ultratop 50 Flanders)	25
Europe (European Top 100 Singles)	5
Finland (Suomen virallinen lista)	18
France (SNEP)	13
Ireland (IRMA)	9
Italy (Musica e dischi)	20
Netherlands (Dutch Top 40 Tipparade)	2
Netherlands (Single Top 100)	47
Sweden (Sverigetopplistan)	5
Switzerland (Schweizer Hitparade)	6
UK Singles (Official Charts)	18
UK Indie (OCC)	1
US Dance Singles Sales (Billboard)	33
West Germany (GfK)	4

=== Year-end charts ===
Year-end chart performance for "Shake the Disease"
Chart (1985)	Position
West Germany (Official German Charts)	29
