= Some Great Reward =

1984 studio album by Depeche Mode

Studio album by Depeche Mode
- Released: 24 September 1984
- Recorded: December 1983 – August 1984
- Studios: Music Works (Highbury, London); Hansa Mischraum (Berlin)
- Genres: Synth-pop; industrial; new wave
- Length: 40:18
- Label: Mute
- Producers: Daniel Miller; Depeche Mode; Gareth Jones

Depeche Mode chronology
People Are People (1984)	Some Great Reward (1984)	The Singles 81→85 (1985)

Singles from Some Great Reward
- 1. "People Are People" Released: 12 March 1984; 2. "Master and Servant" Released: 20 August 1984; 3. "Blasphemous Rumours" / "Somebody" Released: 29 October 1984

Some Great Reward is the fourth studio album by the English electronic band Depeche Mode, released on 24 September 1984 by Mute Records. The album peaked at number five in the United Kingdom and number 51 in the United States, and was supported by the Some Great Reward Tour. This also saw the band using samplers, much like they did in their previous studio album Construction Time Again (1983).

The album was Depeche Mode's most successful to date in Europe, hitting number 5 on the album charts in the UK, and number 3 in West Germany. In the US it hit number 54 and spent 42 weeks on the charts. The album was supported by the Some Great Reward Tour, which ran from September 1984 through July 1985, during which the band filmed the live home video The World We Live In and Live in Hamburg, which was released in Europe, North America and Japan.

This was the first album where they achieved chart success in the US with the single "People Are People" which reached No. 13 on the charts in mid-1985 on the Billboard Hot 100, and was a Top 20 hit in Canada. It was also the first album that peaked at a higher position on a chart that was not from the band's home country as it peaked at No. 1 in Germany. Singles "Master and Servant" and "Blasphemous Rumours", which was released as a double A-side with "Somebody", both also charted in Europe. Depeche Mode followed Some Great Reward with the compilation album The Singles 81→85 in October 1985. A companion compilation home video, Some Great Videos, was named after Some Great Reward.

== Background and recording ==
The band had released their previous album, Construction Time Again, in August 1983, and followed up with a supporting tour that lasted through early 1984. The band went into the studio around Christmas 1983 to begin recording tracks for Some Great Reward while still on tour. Mixing of Construction Time Again had taken the band to Hansa Studios in West Berlin, where the band had embraced the city's all-night partying atmosphere. Songwriter Martin Gore, who had recently left his long-term girlfriend in London and started a new relationship with West German Christina Friedrich, found himself taking advantage of Berlin's S&M clubs and nightlife, and started cross-dressing. In a 1984 interview, Gore claimed that "sexual barriers are silly. My girlfriend and I swap clothes, make-up, anything – so what?" Singer Dave Gahan explained to a journalist that "Martin's [Gore] just being the way he always wanted to be. He missed out on his teens, missed out on just going out, seeing different girls every night and getting drunk all the time. He's living that now. It's not a bad thing – everybody should go through that phase!" Overall, Gahan remembered that the band had a great vibe during this time, saying "We really had like a gang mentality then as well. It was us against the world." Like Gore, Gareth Jones, who was now one of the album's producers after being the sound engineer on their previous album, had relocated to Berlin and was living with his new German girlfriend. Said Jones, "I felt that my contribution was worth a production credit and when I asked Daniel [Miller] and the band, they agreed - luckily for me! My role didn't change that much, however; we were all pulling together in the service of the songs and our quest for new sonic panoramas." During their time in Berlin, the band befriended West German artist Annette Humpe, formerly of the band Ideal, and Gore would later play keyboards on two songs from her 1985 album Humpe.

The band's recent album and single reviews had been positive, and they were upbeat on the new material they were recording, with Gore saying "We just want to produce a really fine album which will hopefully establish us as a major act." Jones said that the band wanted to "evolve", shed their "wimpy" sound, and "make powerful, strong records with a lot of atmosphere."

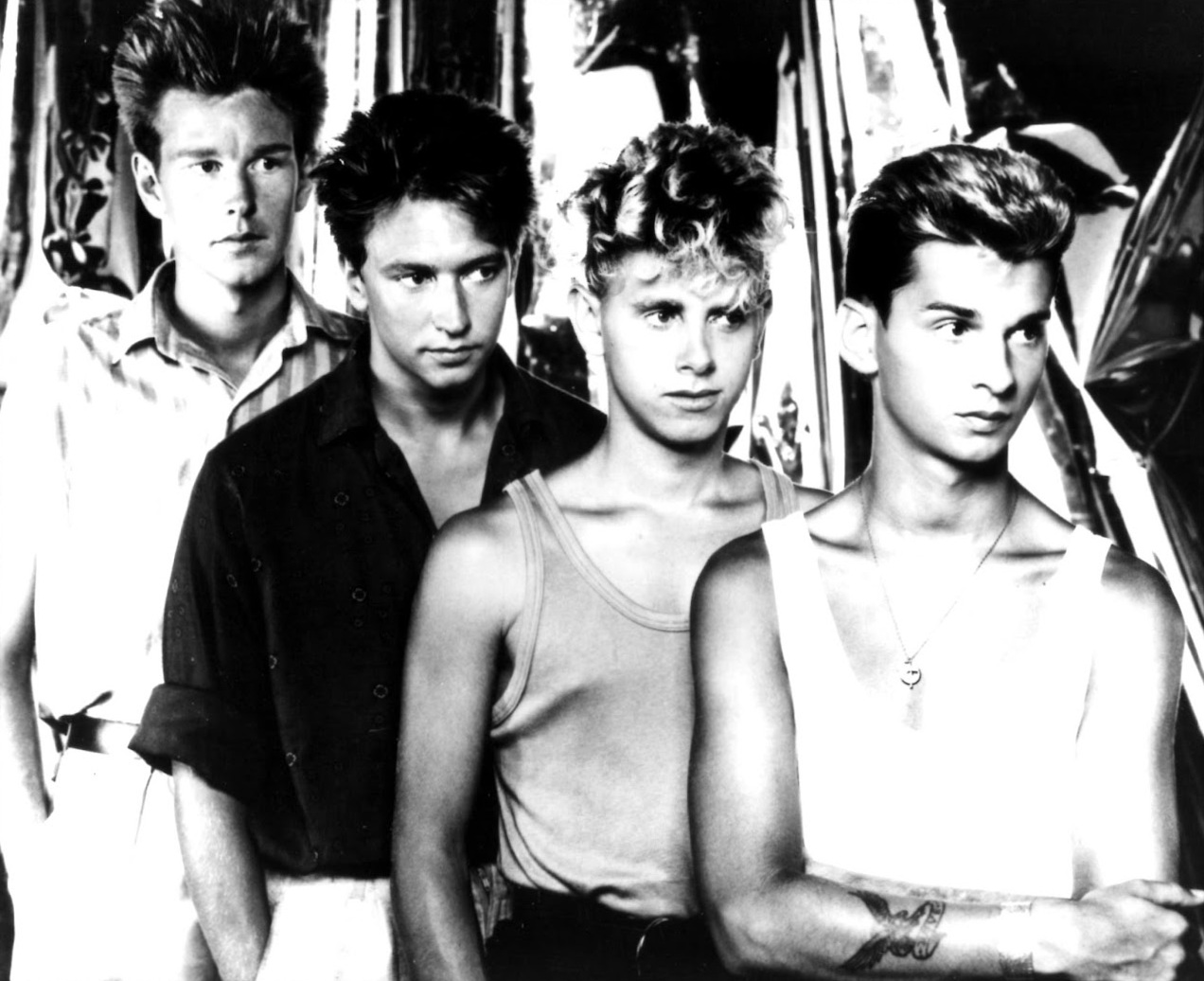
Depeche Mode in 1984. From l to r: Andrew Fletcher, Alan Wilder, Martin Gore, Dave Gahan

The band also worked to improve their public image, and started to be photographed on stage and in the press wearing black leather inspired by their time in West Berlin; Gore started wearing fetish leather harnesses in photoshoots. Gahan said "A lot of people still think we're teeny-wimps," and Gore agreed, saying a few years later that "we had such a terrible image, very sickly. Even I thought we were wimps."

In April 1984, the band's official newsletter reported that "all or at least most of" the songs intended for the album had been written, and they were looking to record their new material starting in mid-May. Depeche Mode originally planned to record Some Great Reward at Music Works studios in London before going back to West Berlin to Hansa Studios to mix and master the album, as they had done for Construction Time Again. Singer Gahan said "we wanted to definitely go somewhere else ... the idea of going to another country [to record the album] really appealed to us." The band also liked Hansa, knowing that David Bowie and Iggy Pop had recorded some of their albums there, (Note: Bowie and Pop had recorded several albums at Hansa in 1976 and 1977, including Pop's Lust for Life and Bowie's Low and "Heroes") and preferred the energy of West Berlin to the "dead" energy of London. However, when the month of recording time that they had set aside at Music Works Studio in London expired, they moved to West Berlin to complete the recording sessions at Hansa; as a result, "most of" the album was recorded at Hansa.

As they had done on their previous album, the band used a heavy amount of sampling on Some Great Reward. The band attempted to sample a live drummer in the studio, an endeavor which resulted in very few usable sounds, but did have success sampling "industrial" sounds such as the sound of striking concrete with a hammer. Said Gore, one day there was construction next door to the studio, and the band would "have the track running with us hitting skips and concrete, and they'd be next door tearing a wall down and we couldn't tell which was which! It was very confusing at times." Alan Wilder, keen to avoid "factory preset and Drumulator syndrome", would typically process voices and sounds through his synthesiser, infuse it with additional effects, and then further modify it via the E-mu Emulator or Synclavier. The band brought in a drummer to sample him playing various drum sounds, and later hit the band up with a large bill, with Wilder saying that "he agreed to be sampled literally just hitting one drum, once at a time. Anyway, we sampled all his drums once, maybe twice. ... he gave us this bill for about 50 different sessions, plus a consultation fee. It was enormous, and the stupid thing was that most of the sounds weren't good; we only used about two for maybe two seconds each on a couple of songs."

One song that was started at the London sessions was "People Are People". Gore partly drew on his own experiences of being taunted on the streets of his hometown Basildon because of his appearance for the lyrical content of the song. Although started in London, "People Are People" was finished at Hansa, where Wilder said that most of the song was sampled into their Synclavier, making the song one of the band's first almost entirely-programmed tracks. Gore's exposure to the hedonistic culture in West Germany led him to write songs on taboo subjects, including the S&M-focused "Master and Servant" and the religiously-themed "Blasphemous Rumours", both of which caused mild controversies when they were later released as singles. "Blasphemous Rumours" was inspired by Gore's early experience at church in England, where he witnessed hypocrisy instead of faith. Fellow bandmate Andy Fletcher, also a lapsed churchgoer, said "I can see why people would dislike it ["Blasphemous Rumours"]. It certainly verges on the offensive." Gore sang "Somebody", which he wrote for Friedrich, nude in the studio. Recorded live, with just Wilder on the piano and Gore on vocals, Wilder called it "the first acoustic-performed track" that Depeche Mode had recorded. Album track "Lie to Me", which "[bemoaned] the diminished role of truth in the world", was one of the band's favorite tracks, although Gore expressed regret that the album version wasn't maybe as good as it could have been. Wilder wrote two songs during the sessions, "In Your Memory", the B-side to the "People Are People" single, and "If You Want", which was the last song he wrote for a Depeche Mode album, although two years later he co-wrote a few songs that ended up as B-sides to singles from their follow-up album, Black Celebration.

During recording downtime, the band recorded an all-covers album called Toast Hawaii, named after Andy Fletcher's favourite snack from Hansa's cafeteria, though this album has never been released. During the course of recording, Gahan spent some time with a vocal coach, where he practiced singing scales and breathing control.

On 3 February 1984, the band played a one-off live show at Birmingham Odeon for the BBC TV show Oxford Road Show. In the midst of recording their new album, and despite "People Are People"'s imminent release as a single, the band's 40-minute set for the show included no songs from Some Great Reward. (Note: The setlist was reportedly "Everything Counts", "Two Minute Warning", "The Landscape is Changing", "See You", "Shame", "Told You So", "More Than a Party" and "Just Can't Get Enough")

In March, the band took a break from recording the album to play a handful of final shows on the Construction Time Again Tour in Eastern Europe, Italy and Spain, and as the band returned to the studio, Mute Records released "People Are People" as the band's next single. "People Are People", bolstered by its use in a West German ad campaign for the 1984 Summer Olympics, went to number 1 in West Germany, representing the band's first chart-topping single. At the time, however, the single failed to make a dent in the US charts. "People Are People" took "social and political subject matter and [made] it quite poppy and commercial," although by 2006, the band's view of the song soured, with Fletcher calling it "our biggest hit that we don't play [live anymore]".

With their popularity rising, Depeche Mode were invited to play a one off-show with Elton John in June 1984 in Ludwigshafen, West Germany to 40,000 fans.

In July 1984, having returned to recording at Hansa, the band's US label Sire Records released their first compilation album, People Are People, when Construction Time Again failed to chart in the US.

In August, Mute released "Master and Servant" as their next single as Miller, Jones and Wilder finished mixing the rest of the album, while Fletcher, Gore and Gahan each took a brief holiday, as none of them had interest in the production side of recording. Wilder held off on arranging his own vacation, saying "I foresaw the fact that we were going to go over deadline and held off arranging one [holiday] myself because I didn't want to miss out on the whole mixing process." Gore recalled that the album was a "turning point" for Wilder's role in the band: "Alan would often sit in the studio with Daniel [Miller] and Gareth [Jones] till two or three in the morning" while the rest of the band was out at a club. In order to maintain better control of his songs, Gore created his own publishing company, Grabbing Hands. The sexual lyrical nature of "Master and Servant" caused a mild controversy, and some radio stations refused to play it. The band performed "Master and Servant" on the BBC's Top of the Pops when it rose in the charts.

=== Album cover ===
Cover design was done by Martin Atkyns and photography by Brian Griffin, with a look described as "industrial chic". The photograph was taken at Round Oak Steelworks near Stourbridge, where Griffin had worked. Both Atkyns and Griffin were responsible for Depeche Mode's previous album cover, Construction Time Again and Griffin had taken the photographs for all of Depeche Mode's album covers to this point. On the back of the cover, the lyric "The world we live in and life in general", taken from "Somebody" was included.

=== Title ===
Like the previous album, which took its name from a lyrical fragment from an album track, the title Some Great Reward was a partial lyric from the album track "Lie to Me".

== Release and promotion ==
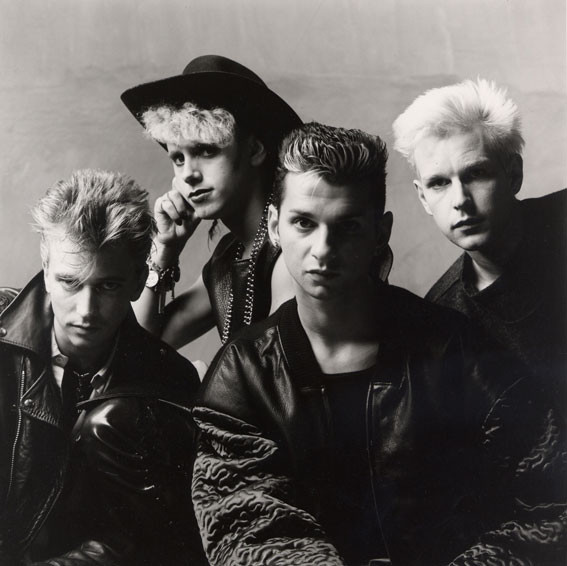
Depeche Mode pictured in 1985

Some Great Reward was mastered in late August 1984 (Note: The cassette master copy of Some Great Reward was dated 31 August 1984.), and released on 24 September 1984 by Mute Records in the UK with catalogue number STUMM19. In West Germany, Intercord Records released the album with catalogue number INT 146.812; initial pressings were made on grey vinyl after the success of their colored vinyl releases for earlier singles. Sire Records released the album in the US, and they also made available a special promotional 12" release with a custom track list and custom sleeve (catalogue number PRO-A-2271).

In Europe, the album was a top 10 hit in four countries, including the UK where it hit number 5 and sold more than 80,000 copies in the first two weeks, and West Germany where it hit number 3. Although it did not chart highly in the US (reaching only number 54), it spent 42 weeks on the charts there.

On 29 October 1984, Depeche Mode released the third single from the album, a "double-A-side" release that included both "Blasphemous Rumours" and "Somebody". Like the "Master and Servant" single before it, "Blasphemous Rumours" stirred up some controversy due to its religious message, prompting rebuking from some members of the clergy in the UK. Depeche Mode contributed "Blasphemous Rumours" to Greenpeace – The Album, which was released in June 1985.

=== Tour ===
Promotional poster for the concert held in Lund, Sweden

The Some Great Reward Tour was the band's longest to date, starting in late September 1984 just three days after the album's release and running through the end of July 1985.

Melody Maker reported that the band were among the first to bring the E-Mu Emulater on tour to help with the musical performance. According to Wilder, "It was a logistical exercise. The live versions were structured in such a way that everybody could load their sounds [into their keyboards] in time to be ready for their first keyboard part. Sometimes extended intros were programmed to cover this problem. Since it took about 30 seconds for each back of sounds to load, it was often touch and go whether everyone would make it on time."

The stage for the tour was their most elaborate yet, with "ramps and risers amongst quasi-industrial strip lights, sheets of metal, and neon tubes." Melody Maker, in a review of their 29 September show, called the set "an impressive design in fashionable grey, [which] combines hi-tech metallics with occasional projections". Gore stood out on the tour, as he continued to wear makeup, fetish harnesses and leather miniskirts on stage. The other members of the band asked Gore to reconsider his choice of wardrobe on tour, but he refused to tone it down. A few years later, Gore reflected on his choice of outfits and said "There was some kind of sexuality to it that I liked and enjoyed but I look back now and see a lot of the pictures, and I'm embarrassed," but also admitted "I didn't think it was going to cause such a fuss." In an interview in 1987, Gore said "The 'Berlin scene' is a bit of a myth – the idea that it's full of weirdos and junkies, though there are quite a lot. The clubs are quite good but not as shocking and different as people imagine. ... I'm not very happy about some of the clothes I've worn. Every interview we do, the skirt is mentioned. I actually think it's quite funny, though I didn't look at it deeply. I regret that so much attention was paid to it and that even now there are still people who think I go round dressed [that way]."

The band played in the UK in September and October 1984, Europe in November and December, then took a break before playing the US in March and April 1985 before returning to Europe in July. American synth-pop and electronic band Book of Love were the opening act for all 15 tour dates of the North American leg of the tour. Although "People Are People" had not had chart success upon its release in the US in March 1984, in early 1985 it had a resurgence there, bolstered in part by LA radio station KROQ-FM, and partly because of the US-only release of the People Are People compilation album, and as a result Depeche Mode were surprised by the large attendance at their US shows; they had not toured the US on the previous tour because of low attendance when they had visited the US in early 1983. Said Gore, "We thought that we would never be popular in America. And when we went back in 1985, we'd suddenly become this cult phenomenon. And we were playing for 15,000 people a night."

In February 1985, before the US leg of the tour, the band returned to Hansa Studios in West Berlin to record a new song, "Shake the Disease". "Shake the Disease" was released as a single in April 1985, just as the US and Asian legs of the tour completed.

In July, on the final European leg of the tour, Depeche Mode played two dates behind the Iron Curtain, a rarity for Western bands at the time. Wilder remembered that "we'd all heard these stories about our popularity in that part of the world and in Eastern Europe in general. People always said 'You're so popular in those countries, you have to go there.' But many bands at that time didn't do that. There were too many obstacles." Depeche Mode played in Budapest, Hungary on 23 July and in Warsaw, Poland on 30 July 1985; they tried to arrange concerts in both Moscow and East Germany as well, but were prevented due to "bureaucracy". (Note: Depeche Mode would eventually play a show in East Germany on 7 March 1988 as part of their Music for the Masses Tour.) In between the two Iron Curtain dates, Depeche Mode played at one of Athens, Greece's first large, open-air festivals to 80,000 fans.

=== Live recordings ===
On 3 November 1984, Depeche Mode played a concert at the Hammersmith Odeon, and the performance was recorded and broadcast on BBC Radio 1 and introduced by radio personality Richard Skinner. (Note: In June 1981, Depeche Mode had performed on Skinner's evening radio show on BBC Radio 1, performing tracks from their album Speak & Spell before most of the album had even been recorded.) Tracks from the broadcast were released on a promotional-only vinyl release (catalogue number CN 4498/S). The 30 November 1984 show in Basel, Switzerland, was recorded and released on a promotional record by Warner Brothers Music in the US; radio stations that received a copy of the 30 minute excerpt from the show were allowed to play the record on air only once. The concert on 14 December 1984 at Alsterdorfer Sporthalle in Hamburg, West Germany, was recorded and issued as Depeche Mode's first live concert video release titled The World We Live In and Live in Hamburg (1985), which was released in the US, UK and Japan on various formats.

=== Subsequent events ===
After the non-stop cycle of recording and touring an album that the band had been under since 1981, they decided that, after the tour for Some Great Reward completed, to break the cycle and that 1985 would be focused on releasing a compilation album, for which they recorded another single, "It's Called a Heart". Both "Shake the Disease" and "It's Called a Heart" as well as all of the band's previous singles were collected on The Singles 81→85, released in October 1985 in the UK. A companion home video, Some Great Videos, was also issued. In the US, a slightly different compilation album, titled Catching Up with Depeche Mode, was issued November 1985, in place of The Singles 81→85.

Some Great Reward was remastered and re-released in 2006. Album track "Stories of Old" was performed as part of Depeche Mode's studio sessions in 2008.

== Critical reception ==
Professional ratings
Review scores
Source	Rating
AllMusic	4.5/5 stars
The Austin Chronicle	3/5 stars
Number One	3/5
PopMatters	10/10
Q	4/5 stars
Record Mirror	4/5 stars
The Rolling Stone Album Guide	3/5 stars
Smash Hits	8 1/2/10
Sounds	4/5 stars
Uncut	3/5 stars

Melody Maker's Barry McIlheney hailed Some Great Reward and noted a "truly remarkable development" in Dave Gahan's voice, concluding that while "[i]t used to be okay to slag this bunch off because of their lack of soul, their supposed synthetic appeal, their reluctance to really pack a punch", the album "just trashes such bad old talk into the ground and demands that you now sit up and take notice of what is happening here, right under your nose".

NME critic David Quantick was critical of the sound of the record, and felt that it "suffers from too many missed grips on good ideas". He continues: "It ought to be an intelligent chart contender, a mix of commercial class and magpie manipulation of the unconventional; it isn't. When that bonk and clatter is used... it's just a nod to left-field, rather than use of the sound." Of the songs and singing he says: "Often the tunes are ordinary; Martin Gore, as ever, favours a bit of a drone. In small doses (singles) this is fine. Over 40 minutes, the interest begins to wane. Dave Gahan's voice has improved greatly – in that he's learned how to use its limited range – but like the melodies, it imparts mucho sameiness to the record." He concludes: "Depeche Mode can be one the few acts worthy of the name pop group. It's just that they should be so much better."

In Number One, Sunie expressed similar reservations: "The sadly under-rated Depeches turn out consistently excellent singles. But 45s rather than LPs remain their forte [...] They've progressed a million musical miles from their boppy origins, but Martin Gore's lyrics haven't kept up. Over a whole LP, their gaucheness is a major distraction from the record's musical merits."

Carole Linfield, in Sounds, felt the balance of powerful music and personal lyrics was just right: "The combination of the Depeche strength of vocal and now the Depeche delicacy is going to be hard to beat... This package is a carefully assorted, daintily arranged symphony ... one that carries emotion, devotion and yet never gives way to feebleness or predictability. OK... the lyrics look trite, often naïve and frequently clichéd when printed out [...] Yet Depeche have the right balance and necessary gauche to pull it off. Perhaps it's simply that power – never mawkish – that sustains it. Whichever way, the combination locks in. The Depeche Mode clicks."

German DJ Paul van Dyk cited Some Great Reward as his all-time favourite album, stating it is "one of the albums that really has influenced both myself and probably everyone who is somehow involved in electronic music."

== Track listing ==
All tracks are written by Martin L. Gore, except "If You Want" written by Alan Wilder. All lead vocals by Dave Gahan, except where noted.

Side one
No.	Title	Lead vocals	Length
1.	"Something to Do"	Gahan; Gore	3:45
2.	"Lie to Me"		5:04
3.	"People Are People"	Gahan; Gore	3:52
4.	"It Doesn't Matter"	Gore	4:45
5.	"Stories of Old"		3:12

Side two
No.	Title	Lead vocals	Length
6.	"Somebody"	Gore	4:26
7.	"Master and Servant"		4:13
8.	"If You Want"		4:40
9.	"Blasphemous Rumours"	Gahan; Gore	6:21
Total length:			40:18

=== 2006 Collectors Edition CD + DVD ===
Disc one (CD)
No.	Title	Length
1.	"Something to Do"	3:47
2.	"Lie to Me"	5:04
3.	"People Are People"	3:52
4.	"It Doesn't Matter"	4:45
5.	"Stories of Old"	3:14
6.	"Somebody"	4:28
7.	"Master and Servant"	4:12
8.	"If You Want"	4:41
9.	"Blasphemous Rumours"	6:22

Disc two (DVD): DTS 5.1, Dolby Digital 5.1 and PCM Stereo
No.	Title	Length
1.	"Depeche Mode: 1984 (You Can Get Away with Anything If You Give It a Good Tune...)" (a short film)	29:20
2.	"Something to Do"	3:47
3.	"Lie to Me"	5:04
4.	"People Are People"	3:52
5.	"It Doesn't Matter"	4:45
6.	"Stories of Old"	3:14
7.	"Somebody"	4:28
8.	"Master and Servant"	4:12
9.	"If You Want"	4:41
10.	"Blasphemous Rumours"	6:22

Disc 2 (DVD) additional tracks: DTS 5.1, Dolby Digital 5.1 and PCM Stereo
No.	Title	Length
11.	"If You Want" (live in Basel, 30 November 1984)	5:15
12.	"People Are People" (live in Basel, 30 November 1984)	4:16
13.	"Somebody" (live in Liverpool, 29 September 1984)	4:30
14.	"Blasphemous Rumours" (live in Basel, 30 November 1984)	5:30
15.	"Master and Servant" (live in Basel, 30 November 1984)	5:33

Disc 2 (DVD) additional tracks: PCM Stereo
No.	Title	Writer(s)	Length
16.	"In Your Memory"	Wilder	4:06
17.	"(Set Me Free) Remotivate Me"		4:18
18.	"Somebody" (Remix)		4:21

== Personnel ==
Credits adapted from the liner notes of Some Great Reward.

=== Depeche Mode ===
- Martin Gore
- Alan Wilder
- David Gahan
- Andrew Fletcher

=== Technical ===
- Daniel Miller – production
- Depeche Mode – production
- Gareth Jones – production
- Ben Ward – engineering assistance
- Stefi Marcus – engineering assistance
- Colin McMahon – engineering assistance

=== Artwork ===
The artwork photo was taken by the Round Oak Steelworks in Brierley Hill near Dudley, England. The Steelworks was demolished in 1984. Nowadays Merry Hill Shopping Centre is at the location.

- Brian Griffin – photography
- Stuart Graham – photography assistance
- Martyn Atkins – design
- David A. Jones – design
- Marcx – design

== Charts ==
=== Weekly charts ===
1984–1985 weekly chart performance for Some Great Reward
Chart (1984–1985)	Peak position
Austrian Albums (Ö3 Austria)	19
Canada Top Albums/CDs (RPM)	34
Dutch Albums (Album Top 100)	34
European Albums (Eurotipsheet)	12
German Albums (Offizielle Top 100)	3
Swedish Albums (Sverigetopplistan)	7
Swiss Albums (Schweizer Hitparade)	5
UK Albums (Official Charts)	5
UK Independent Albums (MRIB)	1
US Billboard 200	51

2017 weekly chart performance for Some Great Reward
Chart (2017)	Peak position
Polish Albums (ZPAV)	48

=== Year-end charts ===
1984 year-end chart performance for Some Great Reward
Chart (1984)	Position
German Albums (Offizielle Top 100)	58

1985 year-end chart performance for Some Great Reward
Chart (1985)	Position
German Albums (Offizielle Top 100)	72
US Billboard 200	91

== Certifications ==
Certifications for Some Great Reward
Region	Certification	Certified units/sales
Germany (BVMI)	Gold	250,000^{^}
United Kingdom (BPI)	Silver	60,000^{^}
United States (RIAA)	Platinum	1,000,000^{^}
^{^} Shipments figures based on certification alone.
