= Christopher Bono =

American songwriter

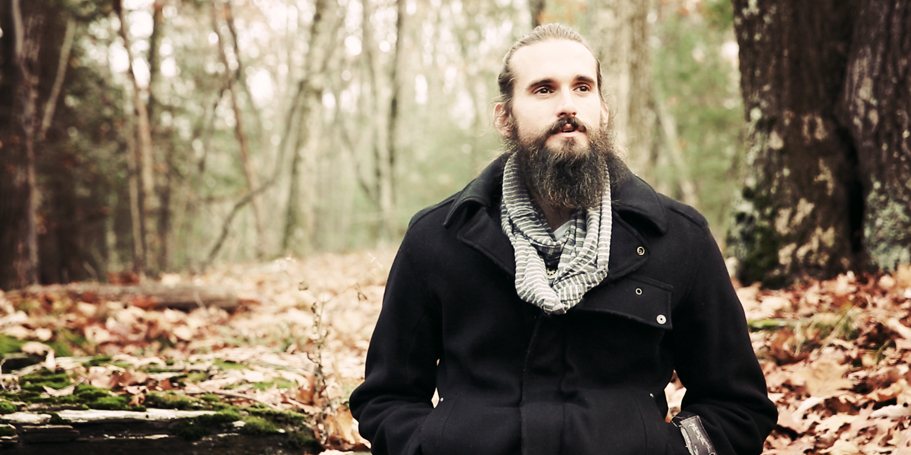

Background information
- Born: 1979 (age 46–47)
- Genres: Contemporary classical, ambient, electronica
- Occupations: Composer, producer, songwriter
- Label: Our Silent Canvas
- Website: www.christopherbono.com

Christopher Bono (/ˈboʊnoʊ/ BOH-noh; born 1979) is an American composer, producer, and songwriter. He is the founder of the ambient post-rock band Ghost Against Ghost, experimental ensemble NOUS, and arts collective and record label Our Silent Canvas. Bono began playing the guitar when he was 21 after being injured while playing baseball at the University of South Carolina. For several years he toured, recorded, and performed in an alternative roots-rock style. In his mid-20s, he made the choice to learn classical composition techniques and for seven years, in nearly hermetic isolation, he taught himself to read music, and studied composition independently with Juilliard professor Kendall Briggs and at La Scola Cantorum in Paris.

In 2010, Bono began the independent label, Our Silent Canvas, a non-profit multi-media arts collective. Our Silent Canvas organizes performances and events featuring the works of contemporary composers and visual artists. "The aspiration is to offer an opportunity for artists, musicians, and composers to reach a more diverse audience through alternative venues and environments." Our Silent Canvas works to encourage exploration of the complete sensory experience, by developing performances featuring a collaboration of these various arts.

== Invocations ==
Bono's first classical album, Invocations, a chamber music collection, was released in fall 2012 and on vinyl in August 2013. Invocations features music for string trio, string quartet, and chamber ensemble, enhanced with electronics and field recordings. Gramophone magazine declared, "If you like Michael Nyman, you'll probably like Christopher Bono." NewMusicBox writer Frank Oteri wrote, "While much of 21st-century contemporary composition is not beholden to any rules, to the extent that I could probably claim everyone to be an 'outsider' in some ways, Bono's music sounds as though everything he writes is something he is discovering for the very first time, even if there are clear reference points throughout to the sound worlds of other composers from both our own time and other eras."

== The Unexcelled Mantra & Unity ==
In October 2013, Christopher Bono released recordings of two choral works, The Unexcelled Mantra and Unity, performed by The New York Virtuoso Singers led by music director Harold Rosenbaum. The recordings were made at the American Academy of Arts and Letters in New York by Grammy-winning producer Silas Brown.

The Unexcelled Mantra is a setting of text from the Heart Sutra, a sacred text in Mahayana Buddhism on practicing Shunyata, or Emptiness, in order to obtain Nirvana. The mantra reads "gaté gaté paragaté parasamgaté bodhi svaha," which can be translated as "Go, go, go beyond, go totally beyond, be rooted in the ground of enlightenment."

== BARDO ==
Christopher's next album release in 2014, BARDO, incorporates a vast source of multicultural influences including -The Tibetan Book Of The Dead, various archetypal symbolism and characters from the ancient Tarot system, sound healing, and sacred geometry. This surreal musical drama narrates the path of "The Fool," a character derived from the Tarot system, as he experiences a spiritual journey through a cycle of loss, despair, inspiration, destruction, death, the afterlife, and rebirth.

The recording of BARDO features members of the Czech Philharmonic Orchestra and the Prague Philharmonic conducted by Teddy Abrams. The sessions were recorded at the legendary Dvorák Hall in Prague, and were produced by Christopher Bono with Grammy Award-winners Adam Abeshouse and Silas Brown.

BARDO was originally a site-specific work commissioned by Sympho Concerts and was premiered to a capacity crowd at the Ann Hamilton Tower in Geyserville, CA in June 2012. Performers and audience members were positioned along the length of the entire structure on double-helix interior staircases. This vertical plane was taken into consideration for the compositional process, and then was translated onto a horizontal level for a larger orchestra.

== Upcoming Releases and Projects ==
Christopher Bono & Anthony Molina (Mercury Rev, White Light Recording) are at work finishing Bono's electro ambient, post- rock project Ghost Against Ghost. Οία, will be released in late 2014, with an accompanying US and European tour.

== Collaborations ==
Nous (pronounced (/ˈnuːs/)) is an experimental music project exploring ritual and spontaneity within music. Nous featured what The New York Times called "a wise, postcategory, electric and acoustic 12-person crew." The inaugural public performances by Nous were on at the Basilica Hudson in Hudson, New York and at Baby's All Right in Williamsburg, New York. These shows followed a five-day recording session with producer and engineer Kevin McMahon (Swans, Titus Andronicus, Real Estate) at Dreamland Recording Studios near Woodstock, New York.

== Discography ==
- Ten Senators and the Rebel Son (2005) Digital, CD
- Invocations (2012) Digital, CD,180g Special Edition Vinyl LP
- Unity and The Unexcelled Mantra (2013) Digital, Special edition 7" vinyl
- Bardo (2014) Digital, CD, Double Vinyl LP
- Ghost Against Ghost (primary composer and producer), still love (2017) Digital, CD, Double Vinyl LP
- Ghost Against Ghost, Checkpoint Charlie (2014) Digital, Limited Edition Vinyl 12
- NOUS, NOUS I: A Musical Rite (2019), Digital, Vinyl LP
- Nous Alpha, Without Falsehood (2019), Digital
- NOUS, NOUS II (2020), Digital
- NOUS, NOUS III (2020), Digital
- Nous Alpha, A Walk in the Woods (2021), Vinyl LP, Digital

== Upcoming Releases ==
- NOUS & Laraaji - Circle of Celebration
- Gabbarein
