= Master and Servant =

1984 single by Depeche Mode

- 12″ single cover

Single by Depeche Mode

from the album Some Great Reward
- B-side: "(Set Me Free) Remotivate Me"
- Released: 20 August 1984
- Recorded: May 1984
- Studio: Music Works (Highbury, London); Hansa Mischraum (Berlin)
- Genre: Synth-pop; industrial
- Length: 3:46 (single version); 3:27 (radio edit); 9:38 (12″ version); 4:12 (album version)
- Label: Mute
- Songwriter: Martin L. Gore
- Producers: Daniel Miller; Depeche Mode; Gareth Jones

Depeche Mode singles chronology
"People Are People" (1984)	"Master and Servant" (1984)	"Blasphemous Rumours" / "Somebody" (1984)

Music video
- "Master and Servant" on YouTube

"Master and Servant" is a song by the English electronic band Depeche Mode, released on 20 August 1984 as the second single from their fourth studio album, Some Great Reward (1984). Its sexual subject matter caused some controversy, leading some radio stations to refuse to play it. It was a top 10 hit on the UK Singles Chart, and charted in the US on both the Hot Dance Club Songs chart and the Billboard Hot 100.

== Background and recording ==
Like the other tracks on the album Some Great Reward on which it was included, "Master and Servant" was recorded mostly in West Berlin to Hansa Studios in early 1984. The band was working to deliberately shed the "teenybopper" image they'd acquired with the first album and early singles, and used the "big" sound produced at Hansa combined with their improved songwriting and evolved image to be taken more seriously as musicians.

"Master and Servant" continued with the socially- and politically-conscious themes of the songs they'd written over the past two years. According to songwriter Martin Gore, "it's a song about domination and exploitation and we use the sexual angle to get that song across."

Similar to their previous single, "People Are People", the band included sampled sounds on "Master and Servant", such as the whip effect, which is based on producer Daniel Miller standing in the studio hissing and spitting. According to the band, they tried to sample a real whip, but "it was hopeless". Other sampled sounds included band member Andrew Fletcher spanking Martin Gore. Final mixing of the track took one week.

== Release and reception ==
"Master and Servant" was released as the second single from their forthcoming album on 20 August 1984, preceding the album's release by one month. The B-side to the single was another new original song, "Set Me Free (Remotivate Me)". In the UK, Mute Records released the single on 7", 12" and limited 12" vinyl, with catalogue numbers 7BONG6, 12BONG6 and L12BONG6, respectively. In Germany, Intercord Records released the single on colored vinyl, with catalogue numbers INT 111.821, INT 126.824 and INT 126.826 for the 3 vinyl formats as well.

The limited 12" single had remixes of both "Master and Servant" and "People Are People" by Adrian Sherwood, Sherwood's second time mixing a Depeche Mode track and also the second time that an artist outside the band was responsible for an official Depeche Mode single remix. Sherwood's remix of "People Are People", called "Are People People?", was called an "innovative", "disturbing" "complete deconstruction" of the song that, according to the Depeche Mode biography Monument by Burmeister and Lange, "fit perfectly into the band's industrial image."

In the US, Sire Records released 7", 12" and promotional 12" versions of the single, though they contained unique remixes not available on the European releases (catalogue numbers 7-28918, 0-20283, and PRO-A-2221). A promotional 7" vinyl was released by Sire Records in Canada (92 89187), and the limited 12" UK single was released promotionally by RCA Records in Spain.

The single reached number 9 on the UK Singles Chart, number 49 on the US Hot Dance Club Songs chart and number 87 on the US Billboard Hot 100.

In 2017, Billboard magazine included "Master and Servant" on their list of Top 20 Depeche Mode songs.

=== Controversy ===
The BDSM-themed lyrics, complete with synthesized whip-and-chain sound effects, led to some radio stations refusing to play the song. BBC Radio 1 debated whether or not to play it; Gore said "There was one guy at the BBC who thought the lyrics were obscene, but he was away on holiday when the final decision was made. The girl who did make the decision agreed with us that it was not an indecent song." Band member Andy Fletcher later said, "we wouldn't say our songs are controversial. They do cause controversy, but Martin [Gore] would say all he does is write about life."

=== Music video ===
Directed by Clive Richardson, the music video was more ambiguous about the interpretation of the song; it included some references to the BDSM scene, but also scenes of construction men working, housewives hard at work at home, and political debates in the German Parliament.

The video was released on Some Great Videos (1985), The Best of Depeche Mode Volume 1 (2006), and Video Singles Collection (2016).

=== Later releases ===
"Master and Servant", in its original or remixed form, appeared on later compilation albums such as The Singles 81→85 (1985), Catching Up with Depeche Mode (1985), Greatest Hits (1987), Remixes 81–04 (2004), The Best of Depeche Mode Volume 1 (2006), and Remixes 2: 81–11 (2011).

=== Live versions ===
Live versions of the song appear on The World We Live In and Live in Hamburg (1985) and 101 (1989).

== Track listings ==
All tracks written by Martin L. Gore.

- 7-inch single

A. "Master and Servant" – 3:46
B. "(Set Me Free) Remotivate Me" – 4:12

- US 7-inch single

A. "Master and Servant" (edit) – 3:27
B. "(Set Me Free) Remotivate Me" – 4:12

- 12-inch single

A. "Master and Servant" (Slavery Whip Mix/12" Version) – 9:38
B1. "(Set Me Free) Remotivate Me" (Release Mix) – 8:49
B2. "Master and Servant" (Voxless) – 4:00

- UK and German limited-edition 12-inch single

A. "Master and Servant" (An ON-USound Science Fiction Dance Hall Classic) – 4:34
B1. "Are People People?" – 4:29
B2. "(Set Me Free) Remotivate Me" (7" Mix) – 4:12

Track 1 was re-released on the 2- and 3-disc CD versions of Remixes 81–04 (2004), while track 2 only appears on the 3-disc version.

- US 12-inch single

A. "Master and Servant" (US Black & Blue Version) – 8:02 (edited by Joseph Watt)
B1. "(Set Me Free) Remotivate Me" (12" Mix) – 7:59 (edited by Joseph Watt)
B2. "Are People People?" – 4:29

- CD single (1990)
1. "Master and Servant" (Slavery Whip Mix) – 9:38
2. "(Set Me Free) Remotivate Me" (Release Mix) – 8:49
3. "Master and Servant" (Voxless) – 4:00
4. "Master and Servant" (7" Version) – 3:46
- CD single (1991)
1. "Master and Servant" – 3:46
2. "(Set Me Free) Remotivate Me" – 4:12
3. "Master and Servant" (Slavery Whip Mix) – 9:38
4. "(Set Me Free) Remotivate Me" (Release Mix) – 8:49
5. "Master and Servant" (Voxless) – 4:00

Released as part of the 2 (Singles 7–12) box set.

== Charts ==
=== Weekly charts ===
Weekly chart performance for "Master and Servant"
Chart (1984–1985)	Peak position
Australia (Kent Music Report)	89
Belgium (Ultratop 50 Flanders)	6
Denmark (IFPI)	4
Europe (European Top 100 Singles)	5
France (SNEP)	34
Ireland (IRMA)	6
Netherlands (Dutch Top 40 Tipparade)	13
Netherlands (Single Top 100)	41
Sweden (Sverigetopplistan)	7
Switzerland (Schweizer Hitparade)	8
UK Singles (Official Charts)	9
UK Indie (MRIB)	1
US Billboard Hot 100 with "(Set Me Free) Remotivate Me"	87
US Dance Club Songs (Billboard) with "(Set Me Free) Remotivate Me"	49
West Germany (GfK)	2

=== Year-end charts ===
Year-end chart performance for "Master and Servant"
Chart (1984)	Position
Belgium (Ultratop 50 Flanders)	92
West Germany (Official German Charts)	33
