= It's Called a Heart =

1985 single by Depeche Mode

Single by Depeche Mode

from the album The Singles 81→85
- B-side: "Fly on the Windscreen"
- Released: 16 September 1985
- Recorded: June 1985
- Studio: Genetic (Streatley, England)
- Genre: Synth-pop
- Length: 3:48
- Label: Mute
- Songwriter: Martin L. Gore
- Producers: Daniel Miller; Depeche Mode

Depeche Mode singles chronology
"Shake the Disease" (1985)	"It's Called a Heart" (1985)	"Stripped" (1986)

Music video
- "It's Called a Heart" on YouTube

"It's Called a Heart" is a song by English electronic music band Depeche Mode, released as a single on 16 September 1985. It reached number 8 in West Germany and 18 in the UK.

"It's Called a Heart", alongside their previous single "Shake the Disease", were both included on the 1985 compilation albums The Singles 81→85 (UK) and Catching Up with Depeche Mode (US).

== Background ==
Depeche Mode had commitments to perform live in the first half of 1985, but had no plans to release a new album, instead choosing to focus on releasing their first-ever singles collections in the UK and US. Under pressure from their label to produce another single after "Shake the Disease", the band went into Genetic Studios in Streatley, Berkshire in June 1985 to record "It's Called a Heart".

== Release and promotion ==
When it came time to release the song, member Alan Wilder disagreed with releasing "It's Called a Heart", instead suggesting that the song "Fly on the Windscreen" would be a superior choice. Said Wilder, "I felt it ['It's Called a Heart'] was really going backwards, it was so poppy and trite." However, the rest of the band outvoted Wilder, and "Fly on the Windscreen" was released as the single's B-side. A year later, singer Dave Gahan admitted that "It's Called a Heart" was a poor choice, and the band remixed and added "Fly on the Windscreen" to their follow-up album, Black Celebration. In a 1998 interview, songwriter Martin Gore called the song "one of the worst things we've ever released."

Both songs were produced by Daniel Miller and Depeche Mode. The Slow Mix of "It's Called a Heart" and the Death Mix of "Fly on the Windscreen" were both produced by Gareth Jones at Hansa Studios.

"It's Called a Heart", backed with "Fly on the Windscreen", was released as a single on 16 September 1985. In the UK, Mute Records released the single on 7", 12" and "Double" 12" vinyl releases with catalogue numbers 7BONG9, 12BONG9 and D12BONG9, respectively. Breaking with Depeche Mode's recent single tradition, there was no limited / L12BONG release of this record, instead a double / D12BONG release, which contained two 12" records released together. Initial pressings of the 7" in the UK came with a fold-out poster. In addition, a promotional 12" was released with a whitelabel to DJs with catalogue number BONG9. In Germany, Intercord Records released the 7" and 12" vinyl singles with catalogue numbers INT 111.831 and INT 126.832, respectively. Initial pressings of the German 7" were on red vinyl, and the 12" initial pressings were made on blue vinyl. In addition, in Germany, "It's Called a Heart" was included on a promotional-only cassette release titled Hitaktiv 85/86.

Cover design of the singles was done by Martyn Atkins and T+CP Associates with illustrations by English artist Tamara Capellaro.

The song reached number 18 on the UK Singles Chart.

=== Music video ===
Depeche Mode's official music video for "It's Called A Heart".

A video was created for "It's Called a Heart", directed by Peter Care. After leaving Depeche Mode in 1995, Wilder suggested that one of his few regrets during his time in the band was participating in the shoot for the video.

The video was included on Some Great Videos (1985) and Video Singles Collection (2016).

=== Later releases ===
"It's Called a Heart" was included as one of two new tracks on the compilation The Singles 81→85 in the UK the same year, along with "Shake the Disease". In the US, it was released on the compilation album Catching Up with Depeche Mode, also includes the B-side, "Fly on the Windscreen", which reappeared in a slightly different mix on the band's 1986 album Black Celebration.

"It's Called a Heart" later appeared on the compilations album Greatest Hits (1987).

A remix of "Fly on the Windscreen" appeared on the compilation album Remixes 2: 81–11 (2011).

=== Live versions ===
A live version of "It's Called a Heart" has not been officially released. Live versions of "Fly on the Windscreen" were released on Devotional (1993), Tour of the Universe: Barcelona 20/21.11.09 (2010), and some versions of Recording the Universe (2009–2010).

== Track listings ==
All tracks are written by Martin L. Gore.

- UK 7-inch single (7BONG9)

A. "It's Called a Heart" – 3:48
B. "Fly on the Windscreen" – 5:03

- UK 12-inch single (12BONG9)

A. "It's Called a Heart" (extended) – 7:19
B. "Fly on the Windscreen" (extended) – 7:47

- UK double 12-inch single (D12BONG9)

A. "It's Called a Heart" (extended) – 7:19
B. "Fly on the Windscreen" (extended) – 7:47
C. "It's Called a Heart" (slow mix) – 4:49 (remixed by Gareth Jones)
D. "Fly on the Windscreen" (Death mix) – 5:06 (remixed by Gareth Jones)

- US 12-inch single

A1. "It's Called a Heart" (Emotion remix) – 6:48 (remixed by Joseph Watt)
A2. "It's Called a Heart" (Emotion dub) – 5:33 (remixed by Joseph Watt)
B1. "Flexible" (Deportation mix) – 4:38 (remixed by Bert Bevans)
B2. "It's Called a Heart" – 3:48

- UK CD single (1991)
1. "It's Called a Heart" – 3:48
2. "Fly on the Windscreen" – 5:03
3. "It's Called a Heart" (extended) – 7:19
4. "Fly on the Windscreen" (extended) – 7:47
5. "Fly on the Windscreen" (Death mix) – 5:06

Released as part of the 3 (Singles 13–18) box set.

- German and French CD single (1990)
1. "It's Called a Heart" (extended) – 7:19
2. "Fly on the Windscreen" (extended) – 7:47
3. "It's Called a Heart" (Slow mix) – 4:49 (remixed by Gareth Jones)
4. "Fly on the Windscreen" (Death mix) – 5:06 (remixed by Gareth Jones)

== Charts ==
Chart performance for "It's Called a Heart"
Chart (1985)	Peak position
Belgium (Ultratop 50 Flanders)	31
Denmark (IFPI)	2
Europe (European Top 100 Singles)	10
Finland (Suomen virallinen lista)	11
France (SNEP)	29
Ireland (IRMA)	5
Italy (Musica e dischi)	19
Netherlands (Dutch Top 40 Tipparade)	16
Netherlands (Single Top 100)	47
Sweden (Sverigetopplistan)	7
Switzerland (Schweizer Hitparade)	7
UK Singles (OCC)	18
UK Indie (OCC)	1
West Germany (GfK)	8
