= Some Great Videos =

Video by Depeche Mode
- Released: 14 October 1985
- Recorded: 1981; 1983–1985
- Genre: Synth-pop
- Length: 46:00
- Label: Virgin; Sire

Depeche Mode chronology
The World We Live In and Live in Hamburg (1985)	Some Great Videos (1985)	Strange (1988)

Professional ratings
Review scores
Source	Rating
AllMusic	4/5 stars

Some Great Videos is the first music video compilation by Depeche Mode, featuring ten music videos directed by Clive Richardson and Peter Care, released on 14 October 1985. Its release coincided with The Singles 81→85 and Catching Up with Depeche Mode compilations released in the UK and US.

== Background ==
In 1985, Depeche Mode elected not to record a new album, and instead release singles collections in the US and UK titled Catching Up with Depeche Mode and The Singles 81→85, respectively.

Depeche Mode did not like the videos made for their second album A Broken Frame ("See You", "The Meaning of Love", and "Leave in Silence"), all of which were directed by Julien Temple, with the band's opinions of these videos ranging from "embarrassing" to being "a complete disaster". Alan Wilder later said, "You can pretty much lump all the Julian Temple videos into one collective disaster. In those days, we were very naive and it wasn’t until Anton Corbijn got involved in 1986, that we realised we could take more control over the cohesive image of the group." The video for "Get the Balance Right!", directed by Kevin Hewitt, was also not included. Videos directed by Clive Richardson, which the band did like, were included on Some Great Videos, as well as videos for their two latest singles, "It's Called a Heart" and "Shake the Disease", both of which were directed by Peter Care.

== Release ==
Some Great Videos was released on 14 October 1985. It was released by Virgin Records on VHS in the UK (catalogue number VVD103), VHS and LaserDisc in the US and Japan (SM048-3062), and Betamax in Mexico. In the US and Mexico regions, where it was issued in 1986, the video for "A Question of Lust", from the 1986 album Black Celebration, was also included.

The cover image was taken by photographer by Eric Watson.

== Track listing ==
=== UK 1985 release ===
VHS / Betamax: Virgin Video / VVD103

1. "Just Can't Get Enough"
2. "Everything Counts"
3. "Love, in Itself"
4. "People Are People" (12" version)
5. "Master and Servant"
6. "Blasphemous Rumours"
7. "Somebody"
8. "Shake the Disease"
9. "It's Called a Heart"
10. "Photographic" (live version)

=== US 1986 releases ===
VHS: Sire / 38124-3
LD (CLV): Sire / 38124-6

11. "A Question of Lust"

=== UK 1998 release ===
VHS: Mute Film / MF034

- Re-issued as Some Great Videos 81>85 to coincide with the release of The Videos 86>98. Contains the same track listing as the 1985 release.

== Notes ==
- All songs were written by Martin Gore, except "Just Can't Get Enough" and "Photographic", written by Vince Clarke.
- "Photographic" is taken from the video The World We Live In and Live in Hamburg, released in the same year.
