= The Singles 81→85 =

1985 greatest hits album by Depeche Mode

Greatest hits album by Depeche Mode
- Released: 14 October 1985
- Recorded: December 1980 – July 1985
- Studios: Blackwing, The Garden and Music Works (London); Hansa Mischraum (Berlin); Genetic (Streatley, England)
- Genre: Synth-pop
- Length: 51:56
- Label: Mute
- Producers: Depeche Mode; Daniel Miller; Gareth Jones

Depeche Mode chronology
Some Great Reward (1984)	The Singles 81→85 (1985)	Catching Up with Depeche Mode (1985)

1998 reissue cover

Singles from The Singles 81→85
- 1. "Shake the Disease" Released: 29 April 1985; 2. "It's Called a Heart" Released: 16 September 1985

Professional ratings
Review scores
Source	Rating
AllMusic	4.5/5 stars
The Encyclopedia of Popular Music	4/5 stars
The Rolling Stone Album Guide	5/5 stars

The Singles 81→85 is a greatest hits album by the English electronic music band Depeche Mode, released on 14 October 1985 by Mute Records. The compilation was not originally released in North America, where it was replaced by its counterpart Catching Up with Depeche Mode.

In 1998, to coincide with the release of The Singles 86>98, the album was reissued and remastered under the title The Singles 81>85, featuring new cover art and two additional tracks.

== Background ==
Depeche Mode had released their last studio album, Some Great Reward in September 1984 and supported it with a world tour that lasted into 1985. By the end of 1984, they already knew that they would not record a new album in 1985, and instead focus on a singles collection to be released instead. News of the collection started rumours that the band was going to break up which the band had to refute in the press. 1984 had been Depeche Mode's most commercially successful to date, and the band wanted to capitalize on the newfound fans they had acquired and give them a way to become familiar with their earlier work. They went into the studio twice in 1985 to record new singles to be included in the collection; once in February to record "Shake the Disease" and again in June to record "It's Called a Heart". Both were released as singles prior to the release of their supporting Singles album.

== Artwork ==
The band had not appeared on the cover of their previous studio albums. (Note: A picture of the band was on the cover of the US compilation album People Are People, released the year before.) The cover image was taken by photographer Eric Watson, and was included in promotional posters for the single "It's Called a Heart", on the cover of the US version of the release called Catching Up with Depeche Mode, and on the cover of the band's first video compilation, Some Great Videos (1985). It was also later displayed at the National Portrait Gallery in London. The inner sleeve included private photographs of the band, as well as their history to date.

== Releases ==
=== Original 1985 release ===
The Singles 81→85 was released in the UK by Mute Records on 15 October 1985 with catalogue number MUTEL1. (Note: Burmeister & Lange's Monument discography incorrectly attributes the date to 1995 instead of 1985.) It was the first retrospective released for the band in the UK. All of the band's singles except "The Meaning of Love" and "Somebody" were included. (Note: Subsequent CD releases of the collection included "Somebody" and "A Meaning of Love" as well.) A promotional pressing of the album in the UK was printed on blue vinyl and is considered one of the rarest collector's items from the band. In Germany, Intercord Records released the album with catalogue number INT 146.817.

In the US, the release was given a different track listing and a different name (Catching Up with Depeche Mode), as the US had seen the compilation album People Are People released the previous year and US label Sire Records did not want to release another compilation album with the same tracks.

=== 1998 re-release ===
To coincide with the release of Depeche Mode's compilation album The Singles 86>98, the Singles 81→85 album was reissued and remastered under the title The Singles 81>85, featuring new cover art and two additional tracks. One of the additional tracks, the "Some Bizarre" version of "Photographic", was the first track the band had ever recorded in the studio, and that original version had not been available to fans since it was included on the Some Bizzare Album compilation in 1981.

== Reception ==
The initial release sold well, reaching number 6 in the UK, number 7 in France, number 9 in West Germany, 14 in Switzerland and 18 in Sweden. Music magazine NME rated the release well, saying "It was only when you heard their career in this way ... that the truth hit you. Depeche Mode are one of the great exponents of the pop single on the planet."

As of April 2006, the 1998 reissue had sold 283,000 copies in the United States.

== Track listing ==
All tracks written by Martin L. Gore, except where noted. All tracks produced by Daniel Miller and Depeche Mode, except where noted

=== Original 1985 releases ===
==== LP ====
Side one
No.	Title	Writer(s)	Original album	Length
1.	"Dreaming of Me"	Vince Clarke	Non-album single	3:46
2.	"New Life"	Clarke	Speak & Spell	3:45
3.	"Just Can't Get Enough"	Clarke	Speak & Spell	3:44
4.	"See You"		A Broken Frame	3:57
5.	"Leave in Silence"		A Broken Frame	4:02
6.	"Get the Balance Right!"		Non-album single	3:15
7.	"Everything Counts"		Construction Time Again	3:59

Side two
No.	Title	Original album	Length
8.	"Love, in Itself"	Construction Time Again	4:00
9.	"People Are People"	Some Great Reward	3:46
10.	"Master and Servant" (producers: Miller, Depeche Mode, Gareth Jones)	Some Great Reward	3:47
11.	"Blasphemous Rumours" (producers: Miller, Depeche Mode, Jones)	Some Great Reward	5:09
12.	"Shake the Disease" (producers: Miller, Depeche Mode, Jones)	Previously unreleased	4:49
13.	"It's Called a Heart"	Previously unreleased	3:51
Total length:			51:56

==== CD ====
No.	Title	Writer(s)	Original album	Length
1.	"Dreaming of Me"	Clarke	Non-album single	3:46
2.	"New Life"	Clarke	Speak & Spell	3:45
3.	"Just Can't Get Enough"	Clarke	Speak & Spell	3:44
4.	"See You"		A Broken Frame	3:57
5.	"The Meaning of Love"		A Broken Frame	3:05
6.	"Leave in Silence"		A Broken Frame	4:02
7.	"Get the Balance Right!"		Non-album single	3:15
8.	"Everything Counts"		Construction Time Again	3:59
9.	"Love, in Itself"		Construction Time Again	4:00
10.	"People Are People"		Some Great Reward	3:46
11.	"Master and Servant" (producers: Miller, Depeche Mode, Jones)		Some Great Reward	3:47
12.	"Blasphemous Rumours" (producers: Miller, Depeche Mode, Jones)		Some Great Reward	5:09
13.	"Somebody" (producers: Miller, Depeche Mode, Jones)		Some Great Reward	4:22
14.	"Shake the Disease" (producers: Miller, Depeche Mode, Jones)		Previously unreleased	4:49
15.	"It's Called a Heart"		Previously unreleased	3:51
Total length:				59:17

Notes

- Original 1985 cassette release: side A (tracks 1–8), side B (tracks 9–15).

=== Remastered 1998 release ===
==== CD ====
Tracks 1–15 on the remastered edition are the same as on the original 1985 CD; additional tracks listed as tracks 16 and 17.

1998 reissue bonus tracks
No.	Title	Writer(s)	Album	Length
16.	"Photographic" (Some Bizzare version)	Clarke	Some Bizzare Album	3:13
17.	"Just Can't Get Enough" (Schizo mix)	Clarke	"Just Can't Get Enough" (single)	6:46
Total length:				69:24

== Charts ==
=== Weekly charts ===
1985 weekly chart performance for The Singles 81→85
Chart (1985)	Peak position
European Albums (Eurotipsheet)	11
Finnish Albums (Suomen virallinen lista)	36
French Albums (IFOP)	19
German Albums (Offizielle Top 100)	9
New Zealand Albums (RMNZ)	33
Swedish Albums (Sverigetopplistan)	18
Swiss Albums (Schweizer Hitparade)	14
UK Albums (Official Charts)	6
UK Independent Albums (MRIB)	1

1998 weekly chart performance for The Singles 81→85
Chart (1998)	Peak position
Australian Albums (ARIA)	135
Belgian Albums (Ultratop Wallonia)	20
UK Albums (Official Charts)	57
UK Independent Albums (Official Charts)	7

1999 weekly chart performance for The Singles 81→85
Chart (1999)	Peak position
US Billboard 200	114

2005 weekly chart performance for The Singles 81→85
Chart (2005)	Peak position
Italian Albums (FIMI)	99

2006 weekly chart performance for The Singles 81→85
Chart (2006)	Peak position
Spanish Albums (Promusicae)	74

=== Year-end charts ===
Year-end chart performance for The Singles 81→85
Chart (1985)	Position
UK Albums (Gallup)	64

== Certifications ==
Certifications for The Singles 81→85
Region	Certification	Certified units/sales
Germany (BVMI)	Gold	250,000^{^}
United Kingdom (BPI)	Gold	100,000^{^}
^{^} Shipments figures based on certification alone.
