= Peter Care =

British music video director

- Born: 28 April 1953 (age 72); Penzance, Cornwall, England
- Occupation: Music video director
- Years active: 1979–present

Peter Alan Care (born 28 April 1953) is an English director of music videos, commercials and film. He has directed music videos for Cabaret Voltaire, R.E.M., Bruce Springsteen, Roy Orbison, Depeche Mode and New Order, amongst others.

== Biography ==
Care began his directorial career as a film student at the Sheffield School of Art (in the North of England).

Upon graduating, he set up the Sheffield Independent Film Company, with funding from the Arts Council and Channel 4. He wrote, directed and produced numerous documentaries and two short films; one of which, "Johnny Yesno", incorporated a soundtrack by a British Industrial cult band Cabaret Voltaire, which was later released as Johnny Yesno: The Original Soundtrack From the Motion Picture. This led to making several ground-breaking music videos for the band. One of them, "Sensoria", became the most successful "underground" video of all time. Voted Best Video of the Year (1985) by LA Times; it enjoyed a seven-month run on MTV and was one of the first three videos to be procured by the New York Museum of Modern Art.

Care later moved into the mainstream, making videos for Killing Joke, Thomas Dolby, ABC, Bananarama, Depeche Mode, Fine Young Cannibals, and Public Image Ltd.

Moving to the USA (with Limelight Films) brought a larger variety of artists: Robbie Nevil, Simply Red, Paul Carrack, Belinda Carlisle, Anita Baker, and Tina Turner.

In 1992, Care helped form Satellite, a division of Propaganda Films. There, his video career blossomed, working with New Order, Suzanne Vega, James, Robert Cray, Los Lobos, Tom Petty, Bruce Springsteen and especially R.E.M. With R.E.M. he directed five videos and the concert film Road Movie.

At Satellite, his commercial career also took off. Clients included Nintendo, Levi's, Lee Jeans, H.I.S. Jeans, Microsoft, Coca-Cola, ESPN, MTV itself, Philips, Southwestern Bell, Saturn, Polaroid, MCI, and MasterCard.

Care's first feature film was The Dangerous Lives of Altar Boys, produced by Jodie Foster's Egg Pictures. The film, starring Emile Hirsch, Jena Malone and Kieran Culkin, was based on the novel (of the same title) by Chris Fuhrman. Released in 2002, it was voted Best First Feature Film at the Independent Spirit Awards.

In 2002, Care joined the bi-coastal Bob Industries, where he was able to return to commercial projects.

In 2004, he re-united with R.E.M. to direct two music videos. He directed an episode of the HBO Series Six Feet Under (Season Four) and continued to direct commercials. In 2005, Care received a Lifetime Achievement Award for his music videos from the Music Video Production Association.

In 2011, Care released "Johnny Yesno Redux", a DVD project in conjunction with Cabaret Voltaire and Mute Records.

== Filmography ==
=== Television ===
- Six Feet Under episode "The Black Forest" (2004)

=== Film ===
- Johnny Yesno (1982) (short film)
- Road Movie (1996) (concert film)
- The Dangerous Lives of Altar Boys (2002)
- Johnny Yesno Redux (2008) (short film)

=== Music videos ===
Song	Artist	Year	Note
"Aftermath"	R.E.M.	2004	
"Leaving New York"	R.E.M.	2004	
"Electrolite"	R.E.M.	1996	co-directed with Spike Jonze
"Secret Garden"	Bruce Springsteen	1995	
"It's Good to Be King"	Tom Petty	1995	
"What's the Frequency, Kenneth?"	R.E.M.	1994	
"Say Something"	James	1994	
"Why Must We Wait Until Tonight?"	Tina Turner	1993	
"I Don't Wanna Fight"	Tina Turner	1993	
"Regret"	New Order	1993	
"When Heroes Go Down"	Suzanne Vega	1993	
"Man on the Moon"	R.E.M.	1992	
"Drive"	R.E.M.	1992	
"I Drove All Night"	Roy Orbison	1992	
"Radio Song"	R.E.M.	1991	
"Keep Coming Back"	Richard Marx	1991	
"I'm Not the Man I Used to Be"	Fine Young Cannibals	1989	
"Hypnotised"	Cabaret Voltaire	1989	
"Leave a Light On"	Belinda Carlisle	1989	
"Good Thing"	Fine Young Cannibals	1989	
"Back on Holiday"	Robbie Nevil	1988	
"One Time One Night"	Los Lobos	1988	
"Circle in the Sand"	Belinda Carlisle	1988	
"Don't Shed a Tear"	Paul Carrack	1987	
"American Dream"	Simon F (Simon Fellowes)	1987	
"Maybe Someday..."	Simply Red	1987	
"Don't Argue"	Cabaret Voltaire	1987	
"What You Get Is What You See	Tina Turner"	1987	
"C'est la Vie"	Robbie Nevil	1986	
"Space"	It's Immaterial	1986	
"More Than Physical"	Bananarama	1986	
"Venus"	Bananarama	1986	
"Stripped"	Depeche Mode	1986	
"Smoking Gun"	The Robert Cray Band	1986	
"Driving Away from Home"	It's Immaterial	1986	
"Final Solution"	Peter Murphy	1986	
"Rise"	P.I.L.	1986	
"Friday Night in This Cold City"	Floy Joy	1986	
"It's Called a Heart"	Depeche Mode	1985	
"May the Cube Be with You"	Thomas Dolby & George Clinton	1985	
"Shake the Disease"	Depeche Mode	1985	
"Be Near Me"	ABC	1985	
"Waving a Flame"	Pookah Makes Three	1985	
"Ed's Funky Diner"	It's Immaterial	1985	
"Love like Blood"	Killing Joke	1985	
"I Want You"	Cabaret Voltaire	1985	
"Vanity Kills"	ABC	1985	
"Hypnotize"	Scritti Politti	1984	
"Sensoria"	Cabaret Voltaire	1984	
"Resistance"	Clock DVA	1983	
"Just Fascination"	Cabaret Voltaire	1983	
"Crackdown"	Cabaret Voltaire	1983	

== Awards ==
- Lifetime Achievement Award for his music videos from the Music Video Production Association (MVPA) in 2005
- The Dangerous Lives of Altar Boys won the honor of Best First Feature Film at the 2003 Independent Spirit Awards
- Best Cinematography for H.I.S Jeans at the 1996 Clio Awards
- International Monitor Awards 1996 – Best Music Video for "It's Good to Be King" by Tom Petty
- Six nominations for R.E.M.'s "Man on the Moon" video at the 1993 MTV Video Music Awards
