= Gareth Jones (music producer) =

- Born: 1954 (age 70–71); Warrington, Lancashire, England
- Origin: London, England
- Genres: Electronic; synth-pop; electronic rock
- Occupations: Record producer; audio engineer
- Website: garethjones.com

Gareth Jones (born 1954) is an English record producer and audio engineer notable for working with Depeche Mode, Einstürzende Neubauten, Wire and Erasure.

== Early life ==
Jones was born in Warrington, Lancashire. When he was young he played different instruments but became more interested in music technology. He owned a simple valve tape recorder and began experimenting with tape editing.

== Career ==
Jones trained at the BBC and began working at Pathway Studios in North London. While at Pathway he recorded Madness' first single, "The Prince", in 1979 and mixed John Foxx's 1980 album Metamatic. When Foxx established his own London recording studio, The Garden, Jones began working there, and it was at this studio that he first worked with Depeche Mode, contributing to their 1983 album Construction Time Again, the first of three albums in a row that Jones would do with the band.

While working with a band in Vienna, the band's manager suggested Jones mix the recordings in West Germany, and took Jones to Hansa Tonstudio in West Berlin to do the mixing. The studio was the most high-tech Jones had worked in, and he decided to live in Berlin and freelance at Hansa. At the time, many English bands chose to record in Berlin as the exchange rate made it far less expensive than recording in London, and Jones worked with bands such as Fad Gadget and Wire at Hansa. At Hansa, Jones began experimenting with recording atmospheres. Bands would play their instruments through large amplifiers which were then recorded with microphones, creating a large arena-type sound. This sound would catch the attention of bands like Depeche Mode, who used this method on many recordings.

Gareth Jones was a pioneer in the use of digital equipment. He introduced sampling to many bands such as Depeche Mode and Einstürzende Neubauten. He began recording with new electronic instruments such as AMS digital delays and the Synclavier sampler synthesiser, which was brought in by Daniel Miller of Mute Records. In the mid 1990s he moved back to London and worked in famous studios such as Abbey Road and The Strongroom in London.

In 2020, Jones produced several tracks for a new technopop band called Of Love and Lust.

Jones collaborates with American composer/producer/Our Silent Canvas label owner Christopher Bono on Nous Alpha, who release new album A Walk in the Woods in 2021.

In May, 2021, Jones and Daniel Miller, recording as Sunroof, released their debut album Electronic Music Improvisations Vol. 1.

== Gear ==
Jones has used the following hardware gear in the past: Roland System-100M modular synthesizer, Akai S-3200 sampler, Waldorf PPG Wave 2.v synthesizer, multiple hardware effects racks, and a Revox G36 2-track tape recorder.

In 2005, he stated that he had begun using mostly software for his productions, keeping him more mobile. However, he subsequently started collecting Eurorack synthesizer modules as the format became more popular.

Jones has used the following music software: Reason and ReBirth, VST plug-ins, Arboretum Hyperprism, SonicWorx Time Designer, BIAS Peak, TC Works Mercury-1, and Native Instruments Reaktor, FM7, B4, and Absynth. He also has an outstanding knowledge of the Logic Pro digital audio workstation.

== Notable work ==
- John Foxx - Metamatic (1980)
- Tuxedomoon - Desire (1981)
- Depeche Mode - Construction Time Again (1983)
- Depeche Mode - Some Great Reward (1984)
- Einstürzende Neubauten - Halber Mensch (1985)
- Depeche Mode - Black Celebration (1986)
- Einstürzende Neubauten - Fünf auf der nach oben offenen Richterskala (1987)
- Wire - The Ideal Copy (1987)
- Diamanda Galas - You Must Be Certain of the Devil (1988)
- Wire - A Bell Is a Cup... Until It Is Struck (1988)
- Crime and the City Solution - The Bride Ship (1989)
- Nick Cave and the Bad Seeds - The Good Son (1989)
- Erasure - Wild! (1989)
- Erasure - Erasure (1995)
- Depeche Mode - Ultra (1997)
- Erasure - Cowboy (1997)
- Indochine - Dancetaria (1999)
- Clinic - Internal Wrangler (2000)
- Depeche Mode - Exciter (2001)
- Indochine - Paradize (2002)
- Interpol - Turn on the Bright Lights (2002)
- Erasure - Other People's Songs (2003)
- Erasure - Light at the End of the World (2007)
- These New Puritans - Beat Pyramid (2008)
- Grizzly Bear - Veckatimest (2009)
- Erasure - Snow Globe (2013)

== Personal life ==
Jones is married and currently living in North London.
