= List of cover versions of Depeche Mode songs =

The following is a list of notable cover versions of songs originally written by Depeche Mode. The list is organized alphabetically by song and then release year.

== "A Question of Time" ==
- Clan of Xymox, 2012
- Exit Eden, 2017

== "Behind The Wheel" ==
- The Quakes, 1993

== "Black Celebration" ==
- Monster Magnet, 1998
- Crematory, 2010
- DMK, 2012

== "Enjoy the Silence" ==
- Failure, 1998
- Mike Koglin, 1998
- Tori Amos, 2001
- Mike Shinoda, 2004 (remix)
- It Dies Today, 2005
- Lacuna Coil, 2006
- Anberlin, 2006
- Breaking Benjamin, 2011
- DMK, 2012
- Lacuna Coil, 2022

== "Everything Counts" ==
- Meat Beat Manifesto, 1998
- In Flames, 1997
- Unter Null, 2011
- DMK, 2011

== "Fly on the Windscreen" ==
- God Lives Underwater, 1998
- Ane Brun with Vince Clarke, 2012

== "Freelove" ==
- Sandra, 2002

== "Get the Balance Right!" ==
- Marsheaux, 2017

== "Here Is the House" ==
- Bluvertigo, 1995
- Andain
- The Echoing Green
- Akos Kovacs

== "Ice Machine" ==
- S.P.O.C.K, 1991
- Lights of Euphoria, 1995
- Röyksopp, 2012

== "In Your Room" ==
- Zeraphine, 2003
- Ayria, 2009
- Tori Amos, 2014
- Anti-M, 2019

== "I Feel You" ==
- Vader, 1996
- Apollo Four Forty, 1998
- Placebo, 1999
- Catupecu Machu, 2000
- The Narrow, 2005
- Samael, 2005
- Collide, 2009
- Johnny Marr, 2015

== "It's No Good" ==
- Chevelle, 2003
- The Dreaming, 2011
- In Flames, 2017

== "Judas" ==
- Tricky, 1996
- Charlotte Martin, 2010
- Leæther Strip, 2021

== "Just Can't Get Enough" ==
- Charly Lownoise & Mental Theo, 1997
- Erasure, 1997
- Nouvelle Vague, 2004
- Hog Hoggidy Hog, 2005
- Mika, 2008 (performed on tour)
- The Saturdays, 2009
- DMK, 2013

== "Leave In Silence" ==
- Marsheaux, 2015

== "Little 15" ==
- God Module, 2004
- Between the Buried and Me, 2006

== "Master and Servant" ==
- Locust, 1998
- Nouvelle Vague, 2009
- Massive Ego, 2009

== "Monument" ==
- GusGus, 1998
- Marsheaux, 2015

== "More Than a Party" ==
- Leæther Strip, 2021

== "My Secret Garden" ==
- Elegant Machinery, 1991
- Marsheaux, 2015

== "Never Let Me Down Again" ==
- Rikk Agnew, 1990
- The Smashing Pumpkins, 1994
- Farmer Boys, 2001
- The Mission, 2002
- Berlin, 2005
- Tre Lux, 2006
- Supersuckers, 2014

== "New Life" ==
- Marsheaux, 2012
- Sheer Terror, 2019

== "Now This Is Fun" ==
- Marsheaux, 2015

== "Nothing To Fear" ==
- Marsheaux, 2015

== "Oberkorn" ==
- Marsheaux, 2015

== "One Caress" ==
- Leaves' Eyes, 2013

== "People Are People" ==
- Atrocity
- A Perfect Circle, 2004
- RuPaul, 2004
- Dope, 2005
- Code of Ethics, 2008
- Callejon (band), 2017

== "Personal Jesus" ==
- Lollipop Lust Kill, 2002
- Gravity Kills, 2002
- Johnny Cash, 2003
- Marilyn Manson, 2004
- Jerry Williams, 2004
- Nina Hagen, 2010
- Placebo
- Tori Amos
- Shaka Ponk, 2011
- Sammy Hagar, 2013
- Slapshot, 2014
- Mindless Self Indulgence, 2015
- Def Leppard, 2018
- DMK, 2018
- Garbage, 2018
- Lauren Mayberry, 2023
- Trevor Horn (featuring Iggy Pop and Phoebe Lunny), 2023 (on Echoes: Ancient & Modern)

== "Photographic" ==
- Pouppée Fabrikk, 1991
- Freezepop, 2005
- Zeromancer, 2009
- Theatres des Vampires, 2016
- Leæther Strip, 2021

== "Policy of Truth" ==
- Dishwalla, 1998
- Disown, 2005
- Trapt, 2012
- Rublood, 2013

== "Precious" ==
- Tangerine Dream, 2010
- Starbenders, 2020

== "Sacred" ==
- Moonspell, 1997

== "Satellite" ==
- Marsheaux, 2015

== "See You" ==
- Marsheaux, 2015

== "Shake the Disease" ==
- Hooverphonic, 1998
- Fokofpolisiekar, 2005
- DMK, 2010
- The Faceless, 2017

== "Shame" ==
- Self, 1998
- Battery, 1995

== "Shouldn't Have Done That" ==
- Marsheaux, 2015

== "Somebody" ==
- Dune, 1997
- Veruca Salt, 1998
- Scala & Kolacny Brothers, 2004
- The Parlotones, 2005
- Peter Jöback, 2009
- Damian Wilson, 2016

== "Something To Do" ==
- Leæther Strip, 2021

== "Strangelove" ==
- Northern Kings, 2008
- Bat for Lashes, 2011
- DMK, 2011
- Friendly Fires, 2012

== "Stripped" ==
- Rammstein (two versions: one ft. KMFDM and one ft. Charlie Clouser)
- Scooter
- Kent
- Novembre, 1996
- In Strict Confidence, 1997
- Shiny Toy Guns, 2005
- Longview (British band)
- Psy'aviah, 2009
- Duncan Sheik, 2011
- Lights of Euphoria
- Leæther Strip, 2021

== "Sweetest Perfection" ==
- Deftones
- Null Device, 1998

== "The Great Outdoors" ==
- Marsheaux, 2017

== "The Meaning of Love" ==
- Marsheaux, 2015
- DMK, 2017

== "The Sun and the Rainfall" ==
- The Merry Thoughts, 1996
- Fireside (band), 1997
- Marsheaux, 2015
- Leæther Strip, 2021

== "The Things You Said" ==
- Arsis, 2006
- Ben Gibbard of Death Cab for Cutie, 2020

== "To Have and to Hold" ==
- Deftones, 1998
- The Ruins of Beverast, 2011

== "Waiting for the Night" ==
- Rabbit in the Moon, 1998
- Lights of Euphoria, 2000
- Ghost (Swedish band), 2013
- Leæther Strip, 2021

== "Walking in My Shoes" ==
- Finger Eleven, 2000
- The Dreamside, 2014

== "World in My Eyes" ==
- The Cure, 1998
- Sonata Arctica, 2004
- Ákos Kovács
- Warpaint, 2018
