= Arisen =

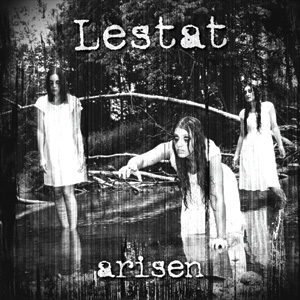
- Original cover art. Released = 2012

Studio album by Lestat
- Recorded: 2012
- Genre: Darkwave, Gothic
- Length: 48:40
- Label: Nilaihah Records
- Producer: Lestat

Arisen is a 2012 album by the band Lestat. This release marks the return of the band after a 10+ year hiatus and an all-new lineup. Jess does not appear on Arisen, but new bass player War, and drummer Scott do. Arisen is available through Nilaihah Records in both physical and digital download formats. Arisen features a remake by industrial band Click Click, Awake and Watching, and a remix of Midnight Toll by Adrian Smith of the same band. Lestat also decided to pay homage to their beginnings by re-re-releasing Red Light by Siouxsie and the Banshees with their new line-up. The little girl vocalist for Little Girl Lost is Susan's daughter, Sarah.

== Track listing ==
No.	Title	Length
1.	"Them"	4:29
2.	"Awake and Watching"	4:53
3.	"Midnight Toll"	4:32
4.	"Arisen"	4:37
5.	"Room 13"	3:13
6.	"Long Since Forgotten"	5:24
7.	"Red Light (Revisited)"	4:02
8.	"Little Girl Lost"	4:36
9.	"Sent from Hell"	3:04
10.	"Nothing Left"	4:16
11.	"Midnight Toll (Spinal Mix)"	5:29

== Credits ==
- Razz (Evan Nave) - Vocals, Drum Programming and Keys
- Susan - Guitar and Backing Vocals
- Timothy - Keys and Backing Vocals
- War - Bass
- Scott - Drums
