= Fiction 8 =

American dark wave/industrial rock band

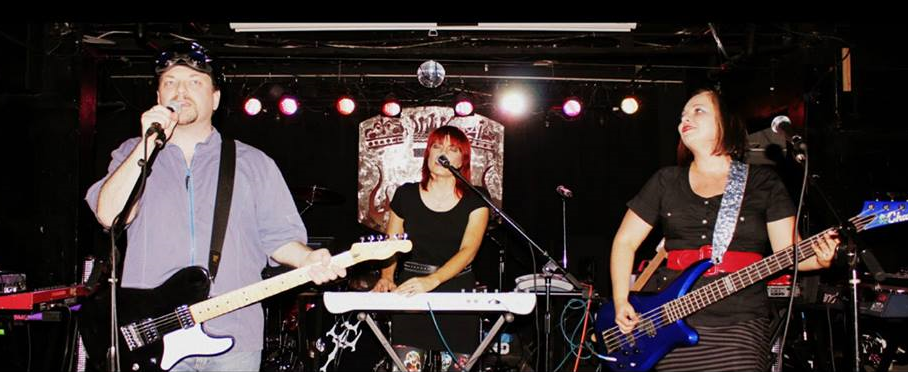
- Fiction 8 live at 3 Kings, Denver. June 2013

Background information
- Also known as: Creeping Eruption
- Origin: Colorado, USA
- Genres: Industrial rock; dark wave; EBM
- Years active: 1989–present
- Labels: Nilaihah; Discordia; Matrix Cube/Trinity; Cryonica; Erisian; Shadowplay Release
- Members: Michael Smith; David DeVoe; Mardi "Paisli" Salazar; Heather Valey
- Past members: Andrea DiNapoli; Steven Hart; Michael Lepper; James Schrechengost
- Website: www.fiction8.com

Fiction 8 is a Colorado-based dark wave and industrial rock group, originally formed under the name Creeping Eruption in 1989.

== History ==
=== Formation: Creeping Eruption to Fiction 8 (1989–1994) ===
Michael Smith (aka Michael Alan) and Michael Lauter (né Lepper) met while attending Colorado State University in Fort Collins, Colorado in 1989. The pair shared a fondness for dark electronic music—including bands like Click Click, Front Line Assembly, and Leæther Strip—and began experimenting with making their own. By the beginning of 1991 they had recorded eight songs which became their first cassette, Eruption of the Mind, which they released under the name Creeping Eruption.

The band subsequently relocated to Boulder, CO, where they played several shows and produced a video for the track "Burn" which was aired on the KBDI TV's Teletunes video music program. In 1992, the band contributed a track for the compilation The Cyberflesh Conspiracy on the If It Moves... (later Re-Constriction Records) label. Around this time, Smith temporarily augmented the live lineup of recent Denver transplants, Society Burning.

During the remainder of 1992, Lepper worked to complete his computer science degree at the University of Colorado at Boulder, leaving Smith to record the majority of the band's second cassette, Dichotomy. Released in January 1993, the ten tracks on Dichotomy were noted for presenting a "softer EBM" style. That year the band enlisted the assistance of Andrea DiNapoli of Boulder band Venus Walk and percussionist James Schrechengost (aka James Ess). With Smith's assistance, Schrechengost built a custom digital drum kit that became a central fixture of early Fiction 8 live shows.

By 1994, the band changed their name to Fiction 8, citing their misrepresentation as a metal band and other perversions of their original name, "Creeping Eruption." That year, Smith issued the first release as Fiction 8, the cassette EP In The Dark, without contributions from Lepper but with production credits by Dave DeVoe of Denver band New Ben Franklins. The EP included several new tracks along with versions of three Creeping Eruption tracks: a live recording of "The Killing Season" and remixes of "Burn" and "Strangers In The Garden". In addition to releasing In The Dark, the band reissued Dichotomy under the Fiction 8 name. Over the following two years, the band achieved numerous appearances in Europe on compilations by Discordia, Side-Line, and Celtic Circle Productions, and in America on the Ras Dva Records quad compilation There is No Time and SDS Productions' Biotech 01 compilation.

=== Label years: Dissonance InDifference through Project Phoenix (1995–2014) ===
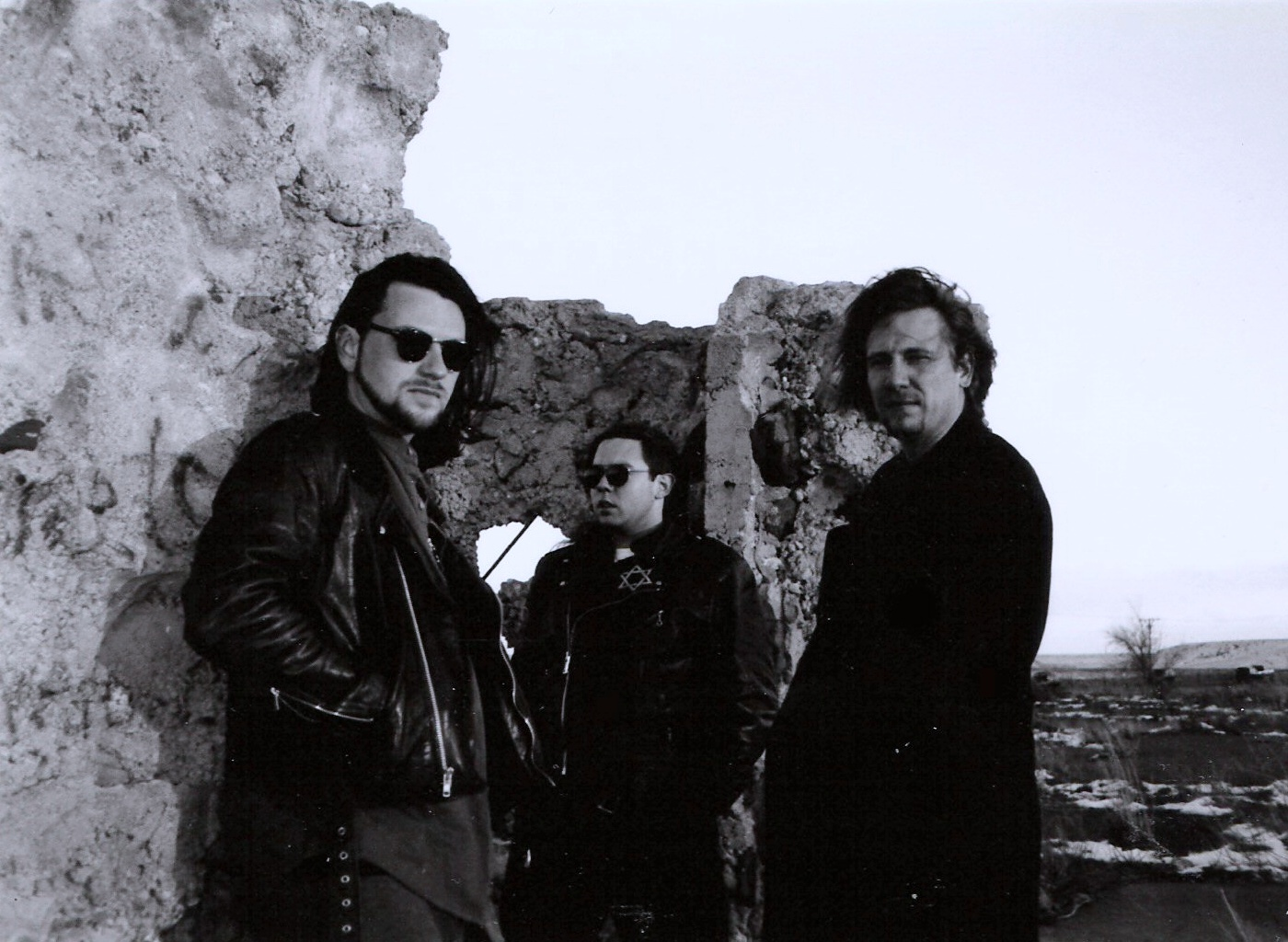
Fiction 8, circa 1996

By 1995, DeVoe became a formal member of the band. That year also saw the band's first CD release, Dissonance InDifference, on the German label Discordia. The release consisted of tracks from previous releases along with several new tracks, including the track "Medusa" which featured guest vocals by Malgorjata Wacht of Siren Project.

After Dissonance, Smith and DeVoe were joined by Steven Hart of Denver band Monastery and work began on new material. Spirits was completed in 1997 and featured all new material including a cover of the Siouxsie and the Banshees song, "Happy House". The CD was released by European label Matrix Cube (a subsidiary of Trinity Records, which later became Trisol Music Group) and was mastered at John Sellekaers' Metarc studio in Brussels. Although completed in 1997, the CD wasn't formally released until 1998.

DeVoe left Colorado after the completion of Spirits, effectively ending his participation in the band. By 1999, the remaining members were joined by multi-instrumentalist and singer Mardi Jones (née Salazar, aka "Paisli"), who had already been working on promoting the band before being asked to join. That year the band played alongside other Colorado bands in the "Underground Against Violence" show, a fundraiser for charities related to the Columbine High School massacre organized to bring awareness to "anti-goth" discrimination in the wake of the event.

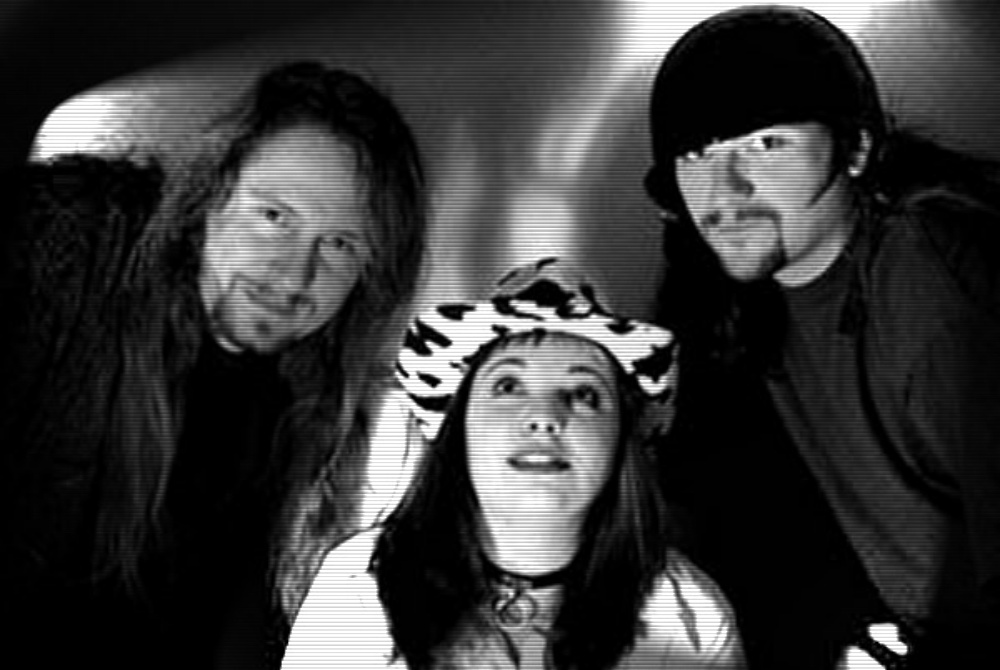
Fiction 8 circa 2000

The band began work on a new album, but Smith claimed that when new material for Chaotica was demoed to Matrix Cube, it became obvious that the band's vision did not align with the label's expectations. The search for new representation led to a deal with the newly-formed American label, Nilaihah Records, who released the album at the end of 2000. In 2001, the band embarked on a U.S. tour with label mates, The Azoic. Just before the tour began, the band signed a European licensing deal with Cryonica Records.

In early 2002, Fiction 8 played a headline set at GothCon 2002 in New Orleans. In May that year, Cryonica released a re-recorded version of Chaotica including five new bonus tracks in Europe. The relationship with Cryonica led to engagements in England including an appearance at Cryofest 2003 in London and an invitation to play the Morecambe goth festival.

In December 2003, the band released their fourth CD, Forever, Neverafter. The album made an appearance on the German Alternative Charts (DAC) in March 2004.

In 2008, the band released the full-length CD Project Phoenix on Erisian Records. The release was the last to credit Hart, who left the band that year.

In 2009 the band played the first Vendetta Festival in Denver, CO. In 2013 they played the Colorado Dark Expo (CoDE), which was a fundraiser for nonprofits that help gay and homeless youth.

=== Independence (2015–present) ===
After Project Phoenix, the band began self-producing their music releases beginning with 2015's Dark Star Disarray. The switch away from label support also saw a marked decrease in live shows in deference to the band spending more time on songwriting and recording. For instance, the recording session for Dark Star Disarray yielded 25 songs which was winnowed down to the 10 track CD release. By this time the band's lineup changed again with the return of DeVoe and the addition of composer and sound designer Heather Valey (née Sowards). The album was characterized as having a diverse darkwave and synth-pop sound that is on "the soft (but still dark side) of electro[-industrial]."

In 2018, the band self-released their seventh CD, The Bleak Disease, which included four tracks that were cut from Dark Star Disarray. That year they also digitally re-released all of their back catalog beginning with Dissonance InDifference on Bandcamp.

The band initially planned to follow-up the release of The Bleak Disease with an EP, but ended up releasing an album length release consisting of remixes from Disease and two new tracks. The result was Constructive Interference which included remixes by Probe 7 and former Nilaihah labelmates, Interface, as well as Fiction 8's own 20th anniversary remix of "Let Go".

After Constructive Interference, Fiction 8 produced a series of compilation tracks including a remix of Love and Rockets' "An American Dream" on The Work Of Sinners, The Work Of Saints – A Tribute To Love And Rockets / Tones On Tail.

== The Bleak Assembly ==
In 2022, Smith joined with Kimberly Kornmeier of Bow Ever Down (and formerly of Sonik Foundry) for a new project under the name The Bleak Assembly. The duo released their first EP We Become Strangers late in 2022, with a follow-up single "Alibi" in 2023.

== Members ==
=== Current lineup ===
- Michael Smith – composition, lyrics, vocals, guitars, programming, production (1989–present)
- David DeVoe – guitars, writing, production (1995–1997, 2015–present)
- Mardi "Paisli" Salazar – composition, lyrics, vocals, bass guitar, keyboards, violin (1999–present)
- Heather Valey – composition, programming, keyboards, vocals (2011–present)

=== Former members ===
- Andrea DiNapoli – live keyboards (1993)
- Steven Hart – composition, lyrics, programming, keyboards, backing vocals (1996–2008)
- Michael Lepper – composition, lyrics, vocals, programming, production (1989–1993)
- James Schrechengost – live percussion (1993–1994)

== Discography ==
=== Studio albums ===
Title	Details
Eruption of the Mind	Released: 1991 (reissued 2021); Label: Metronome Multimedia (self-reissued); Formats: Cassette, digital
Dichotomy	Released: 1993; Label: I.O.T.A. Records, Metronome Multimedia; Formats: Cassette
Dissonance InDifference	Released: 1995 (reissued 2018); Label: Discordia (self-reissued); Formats: CD, digital
Spirits	Released: 1997 (reissued 2018); Label: Matrix Cube/Trinity (self reissued); Formats: CD, digital
Chaotica	Released: 2000 (reissued 2002, 2005, & 2018); Label: Nilaihah Records (reissued Cryonica Music, Shadowplay Release, and self-released); Formats: CD, digital
Forever, Neverafter	Released: 2003 (reissued 2005 & 2018); Label: Nilaihah Records & Cryonica Music (reissued Shadowplay Release and self-released); Formats: CD, digital
Project Phoenix	Released: 2008 (reissued 2009 & 2018); Label: Erisian Records (reissued Shadowplay Release and self-released); Formats: CD, digital
Dark Star Disarray	Released: 2015; Label: Self-released; Formats: CD, digital
The Bleak Disease	Released: 2018; Label: Self-released; Formats: CD, digital
Constructive Interference	Released: 2019; Label: Self-released; Formats: CD, digital

=== EPs & singles ===
Title	Details
In The Dark	Released: 1994; Label: Laughing Tiger Multimedia; Formats: Cassette EP
Raise Your Voice	Released: 2020; Label: Self-released; Formats: Digital single
The Witching Hour	Released: 2021; Label: Self-released; Formats: Digital single

=== Remixes ===
List of remixes, showing year released and artist
Title	Year	Artist
"Ghost Of My Life"	1996	Aïboforcen
"Die Braut Im Regen"	1999	Sanguis Et Cinis
"Twilight World"	2000	Aïboforcen
"Guiding"	2001	Implant
"Plastic SOS"	2001	Aïboforcen
"Progression"	2001	The Azoic
"Everything & Nothing"	2001	Hexedene
"Land Of Tomorrow"	2002	Solitary Experiments
"Stranger In A Strange Land"	2006	Interface
"Serpent Bite"	2012	Fluorescent Echo
"Final Cut"	2015	Blackcell
"A Final Scent"	2020	Missing in Stars
"Strange Angels"	2020	Probe 7
