= Phantasy Theater =

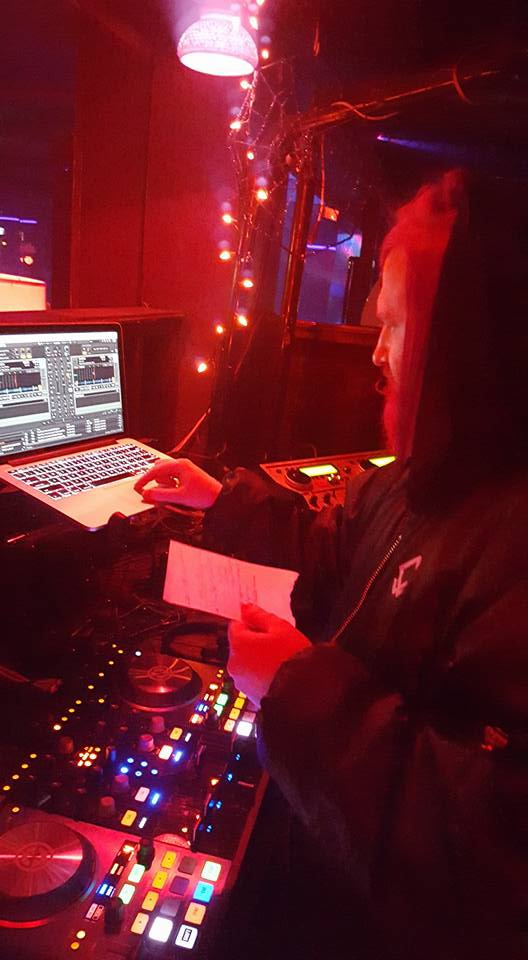
- Angela Rarsheid captures DJ Textbeak spinning at The Chamber, Phantasy Entertainment Complex, 2016

General information
- Location: 11802 Detroit Ave, Lakewood, Ohio, United States
- Coordinates: 41°29′02.1″N 81°46′14.0″W

The Phantasy Entertainment Complex was a staple in the Cleveland music scene since the early 1980s. The Phantasy helped launch nationally recognized bands Anne E. DeChant, Devo, Exotic Birds, Filter, Lucky Pierre, the Adults, The Pagans, Stabbing Westward, and was the debut location for Nine Inch Nails. It was also a stopover for other major acts like Iggy Pop, Jesus and Mary Chain, The Pogues, The Psychedelic Furs, the Ramones and Psychic TV and has hosted reunion shows for bands including Lestat, among others.

== History ==
The Phantasy Entertainment Complex, consisting of the Phantasy Nite Club, The Chamber, Symposium, and Phantasy Theater, first opened in 1918 when it was known as the Homestead Theater. The theater played movies until 1979 and at one point was referred to as the Detroit Theater. Between the years 1976-1977 it was called The Last Picture Show. In the eighties, the theater was renamed the Phantasy, with a focus on alternative, goth and industrial rock groups.

John De Frasia purchased the complex in 1965 when he opened a restaurant inside called Piccadilly Square. After seeing the 1962 film Mutiny on the Bounty, De Frasia built a pirate ship inside the restaurant, which was converted to a music club in 1973. One side of the ship is used as a DJ booth, while the second half is a sound stage. The walls of the complex contains early new wave posters and stickers from most bands that have appeared at the complex since its opening.

Michael J. Fox and Joan Jett performed at the Phantasy Theater in 1987 a day before their film premiere of Light of Day.

Within the same complex The Chamber dance club began in 1996 under the joint management of DJ Cable and Michele De Frasia and had since been the local haven for Alternative, Goth and Industrial subcultures. Notable artists that frequented The Chamber and are from the area included Andy Kubiszewski, Marilyn Manson, Kevin McMahon, Larry Szyms and Textbeak.

In 2009, the complex was investigated by paranormal researchers who claimed to have captured audio of spirits.

In 2010, a fire swept through the complex.

In 2015, the De Frasia family announced that the Phantasy Nite Club complex was for sale. A deal to sell the venue fell through at the last minute in 2018. As of June 2020, plans for the Phantasy to become an LGBTQ community hub and entertainment complex were nearing completion. On July 8, 2020 ownership was transferred to the West 117 Development Phantasy LLC as part of the Studio West 117 complex.

== See also ==
- List of music venues
