= Beyond Humanity =

Studio album by Interface
- Released: March 2006
- Recorded: Summer/Fall 2005
- Genre: Futurepop; Electro-industrial
- Length: 78:56
- Label: Nilaihah Records
- Producer: Eric Eldredge

Interface chronology
Angels in Disguise (2002)	Beyond Humanity (2006)	Visions Of Modern Life (2009)

Beyond Humanity is the third full-length album by Interface. It was released by Nilaihah Records on March 14, 2006.

The album was the band's first to be recorded and produced entirely within the environment of the computer, with little hardware instrumentation. It was also the band's first album in nearly four years thanks to the demise of the Tinman record label at the end of 2005. By that point the band had already committed to recording a new album, and began to shop it to other labels. Landing on Nilaihah in early 2006, the album saw the light of day March 14 with a series of bonus tracks added on. Some of these were remixes of songs on the album while others were of earlier material from Angels In Disguise songs, and the last track "Doubts And Fears" was exclusive to a compilation CD. To make room for the latter, the band was forced to drop a track from the original listing named "Darkness Prevails", which did appear when the band held a listening party premiere on the Side Line chat room in October 2005.

The cover art was done by Evan Eldredge, who at the time was still a member of the band. (He left the band for good later in the year, and his name doesn't appear in the album's notes as a member.) It depicts human DNA superimposed over images of printed circuitry.

== Track listing ==
- "Gravity" - 1:53
- "Age Of Computers" - 5:42
- "Mind Killer" - 4:10
- "Wonderland" - 4:16
- "Despair" - 5:33
- "Stranger In A Strange Land" - 5:47
- "Beyond Human" - 4:42
- "Insomniac" - 4:00
- "Nobody's Hero" - 5:21
- "Faith In Nothing" - 5:15

Nilaihah Records "Expanded Edition" Bonus Tracks:

- "Age Of Computers (Cross Platform Mix by Assemblage 23" - 4:45
- "Faith In Nothing (No Faith Mix by Combichrist)" - 5:20
- "Age Of Computers (Data Corruption Remix by Imperative Reaction)" - 4:42
- "Clear Night (Sean Tyas Melodic Intervention)" - 8:06
- "Doubts And Fears" - 4:55
