= Visions of Modern Life =

Visions Of Modern Life

Studio album by Interface
- Released: March 2009
- Recorded: Summer/Fall 2008
- Genre: futurepop electro-industrial
- Length: 52:51
- Label: Nilaihah Records
- Producer: Eric Eldredge

Interface chronology
Beyond Humanity (2006)	Visions Of Modern Life (2009)

Visions of Modern Life is the fourth full-length album by Interface. It was released by Nilaihah Records February 24, 2009 on CD, with digital downloads available March 10, 2009.

The CD was released as an "enhanced" disc, in that when placed in a CD-ROM drive, the disc reveals the entire album plus two additional bonus tracks in MP3 format and a photo gallery. Guest musicians on the album include Dawn Mitchell on "Voices (Echo)" performing lead vocals. The album's artwork centers around a sculpture by renowned New York-based artist.

The label also packaged the first 200 copies it with special versions of the Transit EP, in the form of a download card that allowed buyers to download the normally electronic EP for free.

In February 2010 the album spun off another EP, this time for "Body Flow".

== Track listing ==
1. "Entry" - 0:54
2. "Voices (Mono)" - 4:55
3. "Destination" - 5:08
4. "Modern Life" - 4:52
5. "Transit" - 4:12
6. "City Limits" - 4:43
7. "Antarctica" - 1:32
8. "Pavilion" - 4:27
9. "Indecision" - 4:24
10. "Body Flow" - 5:18
11. "Corridor V.2" - 4:21
12. "Voices (Echo)" - 4:12
13. "Paranoia's Lullaby" - 3:57

Enhanced CD bonus tracks:

- Destination (V1d3 Remix)
- Body Flow (System Syn Remix)
