= Theatre of the Vampires =

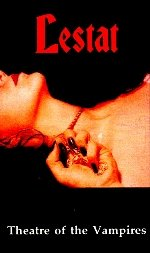
- Original cover art

Studio album by Lestat
- Released: 1990
- Recorded: 1990
- Genre: Darkwave, gothic
- Length: 42:11
- Label: Independent (Formerly Jevan Records)
- Producer: Lestat

Theatre of the Vampires is a 1990 album by the band Lestat. This release was available only on cassette and is currently out of physical print. It wasn't until 2010 that the full album would be available through digital distribution. Theatre of the Vampires was originally released by Jevan Records. This release featured original members Peter and Richard, who would leave the band before their next release in 1991, Grave Desires. Theatre of the Vampires also featured the band's cover of Red Light, by Siouxsie and the Banshees.

== Track listing ==
No.	Title	Length
1.	"Dark Trick"	5:38
2.	"Red Light"	5:32
3.	"Passing"	8:05
4.	"The Forge"	7:31
5.	"Remote Sensory Stimulation"	5:44
6.	"Phoenix"	5:01

== Credits ==
- Razz (Evan Nave) - Vocals, Drum Programming and Keys
- Susan - Guitar and Backing Vocals
- Jess - Keys and Backing Vocals
- Peter - Keys
- Richard - Keys
