= DMK =

DMK may refer to:

== Politics ==
- Dravida Munnetra Kazhagam, a political party in India
- Democratic Movement of Kerala, a political party in Kerala India

== Landmarks ==
- DMK, IATA code for Don Mueang International Airport, in Bangkok, Thailand
- Denmark Hill railway station, London, National Rail station code DMK

== Entertainment and music ==
- DMK (band), a Colombian Depeche Mode cover band

== People ==
- David Moberg Karlsson – Swedish footballer

== Other ==
- Dimethyl ketone, also known as propanone, a colourless organic solvent
