= Interface (band) =

American electronic music group

- Origin: Long Island, New York, United States
- Genres: aggrotech futurepop electro-industrial
- Years active: 1993 - present
- Labels: Tinman Records; Nilaihah Records
- Members: Eric Eldredge; Jon Billian; Justin Parker
- Past members: Michael Anthony Cummings; Joseph Destry; Evan Eldredge; J. Joseph Dobise
- Website: Official Site

Interface is an electronic music group based on Long Island, New York. It was founded in 1993 by Eric Eldredge (keyboards, sequences, and vocals). Its career has been lined with a steady output of songs and dance remixes for other artists and several lineup shifts. Each of its three albums to date display a blend of various styles of electronic music, most notably trance, synthpop, electro-industrial and aggrotech, with a strong sense of melody and songwriting.

== Band history ==
The project became a serious entity when Eldredge left another group, Valve, in 1997. The band's inaugural lineup also included Joseph Destry (guitar, vocals) and Mike Cummings a/k/a DJ ANGZTEK (drums). In total Interface released four demo tapes between 1993 and 1998, with little interest from record labels or the music press. DJ ANGZTEK (Mindsett, Absolution) and Destry left Interface in 1998, leaving Eldredge as its sole member.

Interface self-released the first LP The Artemis Complex in January 1999. New Brunswick, New Jersey based label Tinman Records signed the group, picked up the album and released it that summer. A rather ordinary sampling of Industrial and EBM aesthetics of the time, it did win Interface a small cult following, helped immensely by the mp3.com music website. The onstage lineup expanded to Eric's brother Evan Eldredge (guitar, keyboards, vocals) and Jon Billian (keyboards) that summer.

The second release, July 2002's Angels In Disguise, proved to be Interface's breakthrough into the dark electronic world. Besides a vastly improved overall sound, singles like "Wasted Time" and the title track saw heavy club, indie radio, and webcast play throughout North America and Europe. The higher profile landed them better remix work and live support slots (such as a 2003 show with The Human League). Despite the album's runaway success, Tinman fell into financial trouble, washing out a follow-up remix companion to Angels. Tinman finally shut down in 2005, just as the group announced a new album was in the works.

In 2005, after recording the album, titled Beyond Humanity, Interface began an exhaustive search for a new label, finally landing with Nilaihah Records, a Columbus, Ohio-based label founded by Kristy Venrick of The Azoic. Finally released in March 2006 as an expanded edition with extra tracks added on, the album once again solidified the group's songwriting and production ability. The album's tracks "Age of Computers" and "Doubts and Fears" found their way onto top compilation CDs (Cryonica Tanz 4 and The State of Synthpop 2005, respectively).

Evan Eldredge left the group in 2006 to pursue other interests.

In 2006, the band collaborated with fellow New Yorker Viral Consciousness on a remake of Depeche Mode's "Never Let Me Down Again" for the Cryonica tribute album Bright Lights, Dark Room.

2007 saw the debut of the band's most current touring lineup at the Black Sun Festival in August, now adding J. Joseph Dobise as an additional keyboard player and drummer Justin Parker. In addition, they finally recorded a cover of "Land Of Confusion" by Genesis for the Sigsaly Media compilation Machines Against Hunger (according to the Interface website, they have performed it live since 2003 and it was a fan favorite at concerts).

The Cryonica Tanz V5 compilation was announced on March 28, 2008 as including a new Interface song called "Destination", as remixed by Mindless Faith. On a Myspace blog on December 24, 2007 the band announced that a new album Destination Focus will be out in 2008, preceded by an EP called Modern Life. However, these names appeared reversed upon the release of Destination Focus as the EP on October 28. Visions Of Modern Life was released February 24, 2009 on Nilaihah. The first 200 copies sold from Nilaihah's mail order site also included a free copy of the Transit EP via digital download card.

Interface has spent much of 2009 and 2010 with more tour dates and festival appearances as well as the release of an EP for the song "Body Flow", making it the third single pulled from Visions of Modern Life.

== Members ==
- Eric Eldredge - lead vocals, programming/sequencing, production, keyboards
- Jonathan Billian - live keyboards, live guitar, programming/sequencing, sampling, vocoder
- Justin Parker - live electronic drums

== Former members ==
- Evan Eldredge (1999–2006) - guitars, keyboards, backing vocals, additional production
- Joseph Destry a/k/a DJ CYN (1997–1998) - guitars, vocals, keyboards
- Michael A. Cummings a/k/a DJ ANGZTEK (1997–1998) - drums

== Discography (Albums & EPs) ==
- 1999: The Artemis Complex (Tinman Records)
- 2002: Angels In Disguise (Tinman Records)
- 2003: Wasted Time EP (Internet limited edition)
- 2003: Disguised As Angels (Tinman Records, Companion remix album to Angels In Disguise)
- 2004: Doubts And Fears EP (Nilaihah Records)
- 2005: Age Of Computers EP (Nilaihah Records)
- 2006: Beyond Humanity (Nilaihah Records)
- 2008: Destination Focus EP (Nilaihah Records)
- 2009: Visions of Modern Life (Nilaihah Records)
- 2009: Transit EP (Nilaihah Records)
- 2010: Body Flow EP (Nilaihah Records)
- 2013: It Begins Today EP (Internet limited edition)
- 2013: The Perfect World (Nilaihah Records)
- 2014: Stateless EP (Internet limited edition)
- 2014: Mirror Mirror EP (Internet limited edition)
- 2018: Dangerous Game EP [Featuring Mari Kattman] (Nilaihah Records)
- 2019: Outside Looking In EP (Distortion Productions)
- 2019: Where All Roads Lead (Distortion Productions)

== Discography (Compilation Appearances) ==
- Ringworm V1 (1999, Tinman) - "Frantic"
- Don't Blow Your Cover: A Tribute to KMFDM (2000) - "Sex on a Flag"
- The Art of War: Divide (2004, Remixwars.com) - "Age Of Computers 2.0"
- The State of Synthpop 2005 (2005, A Different Drum) - "Doubts and Fears"
- Cryonica Tanz V4 (2005, Cryonica) - "Age of Computers (Club Version)"
- Bright Lights, Dark Room: A Depeche Mode B-Sides Tribute (2006, Cryonica) - Never Let Me Down Again (Aggro Mix) (collaboration with Viral Consciousness)
- Fourplay Vol.1 (2006, Nilaihah) - "Stranger In A Strange Land (Club Rapture)", "Escape (Momentum Mix)", "Stranger In A Strange Land (Blueliner Mix by Fiction 8)", "Doubts and Fears (Gold Paralax Mix)", "Beyond Human (Lukotyk Mutation)".
- Fxxk The Mainstream Vol. 1 Box Set (2007, Alfa Matrix) - "Nobody's Hero (Vengeance Version)"
- Machines Against Hunger (2008, Sigsaly Media) - "Land Of Confusion"
- Cryonica Tanz V5 (2008, Cryonica) - "Destination (Mindless Faith Remix)"
- Electronic Saviors: Industrial Music To Cure Cancer (2010, Metropolis Records) - "Never Say Farewell"

== Other "Interfaces" in Music ==
Due to "Interface" being a rather common word, especially in electronic music, other artists have used the name in the past, posing a potential element of confusion amongst music collectors.

- The website Discogs.com lists no fewer than 20 artist listings under "Interface". It is unclear how many of them are duplicates, or how many were one-off acts or projects that are currently still active.
- Hollywood, California based producer/remixer/sound designer Julian Synne contributed several remixes to Cleopatra Records throughout the 1990s, with many of them being called an "Interface Remix". Many of these are available on the label's extensive line of tribute compilations. Several websites have incorrectly attributed many of these tracks to "this" Interface.
- A jungle DJ/producer in England goes by the name Interface.
- UK sound engineer and music producer Mark Summers began as a DJ whose sound evolved and career expanded. In 1993-1995 he produced three or more 12" vinyl Tuch Wood Records as "Interface" with other aliases for other tracks. He produced and remixed many Chrysalis Music artists and their offshoot dance label Tuch Wood/Tuchwood Records, co-owned by DJ-producer Dave Lee (Joey Negro).
- hardcore legend Interface (aka Mike Ash)
- Interface was the name of an Italo disco group active in the late 1980s). They produced 2 notable singles, "Plastic Age" and "Like Puppets". The Last FM website has mistakenly merged them with the above incarnation.
- A Christian rock group made by members of a seminary in Fort Myers, Florida goes by the name Interface.
- A metal act from Lucerne, Switzerland emerged under the name, but usually adds "Lucerne" to avoid confusion.
- A one-off improvisational project released one album called Swank under the name in 2001, but have not done anything since.
- Active since early 2010s, a rock-pop band from Madrid, Spain goes by the name "Interfaces".
