= NNB =

NNB may refer to:

- New Northwest Broadcasters, radio station broadcaster
- NamNamBulu, music band
- Non Non Biyori, anime and manga series
