= Lestat =

Lestat may refer to:

- Lestat de Lioncourt, vampire character introduced in Anne Rice's 1976 novel Interview with the Vampire
- Lestat (band), American dark wave gothic band active 1988–2000 and 2010-2014
- Lestat (musical), 2006 Broadway show based on Anne Rice's The Vampire Chronicles
