= Cover band =

Type of band that plays cover songs

A cover band (or covers band) is a band that plays songs recorded by someone else, sometimes mimicking the original as accurately as possible, and sometimes re-interpreting or changing the original. These remade songs are known as cover songs. New or unknown bands often find the format marketable for smaller venues, such as pubs, clubs or parks. The bands also perform at private events, for example, weddings and birthday parties, and may be known as a wedding band, party band, function band or band-for-hire. A band whose covers consist mainly of songs that were chart hits is often called a top 40 band. Some bands, however, start as cover bands, then grow to perform original material. For example, the Rolling Stones released three albums consisting primarily of covers before recording one with their own original material.

Cover bands play several types of venues. When a band is starting out, they might play private parties and fundraisers, often for little or no money, or in return for food and bar privileges, although many professional musicians refuse to do this. With enough experience, a band will begin to "play out" professionally at bars and night clubs. Some cover bands are made up of full-time professional musicians. These bands are usually represented by an entertainment agency.

When cover bands consist of professional musicians, they often do not have a fixed lineup; rather, they are often made up of a flexible lineup of session musicians, utilizing "dep" (deputy, that is, stand-in) musicians where necessary. The music industry is considered by many musicians as a relatively difficult industry to make an income in, and cover bands can be a good source of income for professional musicians alongside other work.

== Music ==
Cover bands play songs written and recorded by other artists, usually well-known songs (as compared to "original" bands which play music they themselves have written). There are a wide variety of cover bands – some cover bands play material from particular decades, for example, a 1980s cover band. Others focus exclusively on the music of a particular group, usually iconic groups, and are called tribute bands. It is not uncommon to find tribute bands performing the songs of The Beatles, Led Zeppelin, Kiss, Pink Floyd, Oasis, Duran Duran, Aerosmith, or U2. Some cover bands will play a variety of song styles, from different artists, genres, and decades. Another type of cover band is one that plays songs in a different genre or style than that of the original composition (e.g., jazz versions of what were originally hard rock songs).

Some cover bands perform covers that are of a different musical genre from the originals. For instance:

- Richard Cheese covers rock and rap songs in the style of lounge music.
- Gregorian covers pop and rock songs in the style of Gregorian chant.
- Gabba covers the pop songs of ABBA in the punk style of the Ramones (the name is also a reference to the chant "Gabba Gabba Hey" from the Ramones' song "Pinhead" from their Leave Home album).
- Nouvelle Vague covers new wave-era bands with a bossa nova twist.
- Me First and the Gimme Gimmes is known for punk covers of other artists, with each album picking a different genre or era (i.e. hits of the 1970s, showtunes, etc.)
- Dread Zeppelin specialized in reggae versions of Led Zeppelin songs, with an Elvis impersonator on lead vocals.
- Hayseed Dixie started as a "hillbilly tribute to AC/DC" and has become a bluegrass tribute band covering many well-known rock bands in their own "rockgrass" style.
- Run C&W performed bluegrass arrangements of 1960s soul music, primarily classics from the Motown catalog.
- Turetsky's Choir, a former synagogue choir from Moscow is famous for its remakes of music pieces from different styles, ranging from opera classic to pop hits. The band's repertoire usually includes covers only. Some of them are arranged into medleys.
- The Baseballs are a German band, known for doing rockabilly covers of 2000s pop songs, like "Bleeding Love" and "Umbrella".
- UB40 were an English band best known for reggae versions of 1950s and 1960s pop songs.
- Mallavoodoo, a Brazilian band from Recife, plays instrumental covers of hard rock with keyboards and saxophone.
- DMK, a Colombian band featuring Dicken Schrader and his children Milah and Korben, plays Depeche Mode songs using an old keyboard, toys and various household items as instruments.
- Taco is most famous for his Great American Songbook show tune covers, rearranged as synthpop.
- Ray Charles, particularly from the 1960s onward, devoted much of his recording career to soul covers of pop, jazz and country music.
- The Mike Flowers Pops rearranges popular music into easy listening, with their most famous cover being that of "Wonderwall," originally by Oasis.
- Postmodern Jukebox reimagines popular music in classic pre-rock era styles such as jazz, gospel and rhythm and blues.

== Examples of cover acts ==
- Apocalyptica – Finnish metal band with covers of Metallica, Faith No More, Sepultura, Slipknot, David Bowie, and Pantera performed by four cellists and a drummer, among original music.
- Billy Murray – One of the early 20th century's most prolific recording artists, his covers of popular songs and show tunes of the time serve as some of the earliest recordings of popular music
- Blue Swede – Swedish cover band, active between 1973 and 1975, best known for their international hit cover of "Hooked on a Feeling"
- Bo Donaldson and The Heywoods – American band whose greatest success came with covers of British hits that failed to chart in the United States
- Camp Freddy – Cover band featuring Dave Navarro of Jane's Addiction, and several other successful musicians.
- Clout – Late 1970s South African cover band, best known for their international hit cover of "Substitute"
- Danny Marino – Finnish singer, who in addition to his own English language songs regularly covered hits in the Finnish language
- Dark Star Orchestra – Grateful Dead cover band that recreates the feel of individual Grateful Dead performances.
- Donny Osmond – 1970s teen idol whose greatest hits as a solo artist (and with duets with sister Marie Osmond) came from re-recordings of 1950s and 1960s pop songs. (In contrast, The Osmonds as a whole typically recorded their own music.)
- Engelbert Humperdinck – English singer who spent much of his early career as a cover artist, including a string of covers of American country songs.
- The Happenings – A 1960s cover band who charted several covers on the Billboard Hot 100 charts.
- The Human Beinz – A 1960s blue-eyed soul cover band, one-hit wonders in the U.S. for their version of The Isley Brothers' "Nobody but Me"
- Jimmy and the Soulblazers – Covers of 1960s and 1970s Soul music.
- Joe Cocker – The "Sheffield Soul Shouter" has covered music by many artists including The Beatles, Dave Mason, and The Lovin' Spoonful.
- Joe Dassin – American singer who was a major success in France through his French-language covers of English language hits.
- Johnny Rivers – A substantial portion of Rivers's hit discography came from covers of blues and R&B songs.
- Kidz Bop – Children cover pop songs. Songs with explicit lyrics are adjusted to be more kid-appropriate.
- Liquid Blue – Cover band from San Diego, California that mixes covers and originals and has performed in over 100 countries.
- Lt. Dan Band – a cover band founded by Kimo Williams and actor Gary Sinise. The band is named after the character Lieutenant Dan Taylor, whom Sinise portrayed in the film Forrest Gump.
- Pat Boone – Boone released an album in 1997 entitled In a Metal Mood: No More Mr. Nice Guy which is a collection of his rock and metal covers. He had previously earned notoriety for his pop covers of rhythm and blues hits in the 1950s, many of which outperformed the original versions on the charts.
- Richard Cheese and Lounge Against The Machine – a parody cover band created by comedian Mark Jonathan Davis. The band performs popular songs (typically from rock bands) in a lounge, big band, or swing style.
- Sha Na Na – Another 1960s and 1970s rock band that plays rock and roll music from the 1950s and early-1960s. They burst onto the scene in 1969 when they performed at the Woodstock music festival and went on to have their own variety show similar to the Monkees.
- Three Dog Night – 1960s and 1970s rock band that almost exclusively recorded covers of songs by many different artists and genres.
- Vicious White Kids – a short-lived punk rock band founded by former Sex Pistols members, Sid Vicious and Glen Matlock, that mainly covered songs by Sex Pistols, the Stooges and most notably Frank Sinatra's "My Way".
- Michael Bublé and Susan Boyle are internationally successful and most of their music consists of covers.
- Ukulele Orchestra of Great Britain – A ukulele cover band parodying an orchestra who have performed at the 50th anniversary VE day celebrations before an estimated audience of 170,000 and at WOMAD, Glastonbury festival, New York's Carnegie Hall, the Sydney Opera House and at the BBC Proms 2009 Season at London's Royal Albert Hall which was broadcast live on BBC Radio 3. A typical UOGB concert is an eclectic mixture of songs ranging from the Sex Pistols, David Bowie, Blur, Hawkwind, Grace Jones, Clean Bandit, Nirvana to Bach and Beethoven to Spaghetti Western soundtracks; a mix of music genres, from classical music to punk, grunge, rock and roll, and the whole range of popular music, with parody, musical humour and mixing genres long being part of their act.
- William Shatner – infamous for his spoken word covers of popular songs

== Fictional cover acts ==
- Rock Star starring Mark Wahlberg who had a small group that performs cover songs from a fictional band called Steel Dragon. He eventually became the lead singer of the said band when a recorded performance was seen by the band members.
- Detroit Rock City is the story of four teenagers in the 1970s who are in a Kiss cover band called "Mystery".
- Full House the character, Jesse Katsopolis is the frontman and guitarist for "Jesse and the Rippers" which was a local rock band who mostly did Beach Boys and Elvis Presley covers. John Stamos, who played Jesse on the series, has been an on-and-off drummer for the Beach Boys touring lineup.
- Saving Silverman features three friends who are diehard Neil Diamond fans, and they form a cover band called "Diamonds in the Rough".

== See also ==
- Tribute act
- Elvis impersonator
- Entertainment Agency
