= The Artemis Complex =

Studio album by Interface
- Released: January 1999
- Recorded: 1998
- Genre: electro-industrial
- Length: 60:56
- Label: Tinman Records
- Producer: Eric Eldredge

Interface chronology
The Artemis Complex (1999)	Angels In Disguise (2002)

The Artemis Complex is the debut album for Interface, released in January 1999. Originally self-pressed and intended to be sold independently, it wasn't long before Tinman Records signed Interface to a distribution deal. Between the album's release and the band's increasing marketing presence on the internet, Interface's fanbase grew accordingly. Tinman also lifted the track "Frantic" for their compilation CD Ringworm V1 in early 1999. It received favorable reviews in publications like "DAMN!" magazine and the Long Island Press.

Overall, the album's raw, gritty sound is reminiscent of mid 1990s electro-industrial, combining definitive recordings of tracks heard on earlier demo tapes with newer dance tracks and atmospheric instrumentals. The album was mainly performed, produced, and recorded by Eric Eldredge in the fall of 1998. It includes two of the band's most enduring songs, "Metalstorm" and "The Softest Blade".

The album's name comes from an article in a psychology magazine about women's behavior patterns when expecting negative results from romantic relationships before they occur.

The cover was designed by photo artist Kim Lauer, and depicts a heavily manipulated image of the Greek goddess Artemis.

With the now-defunct Tinman label's quantities depleted, the original album is now out of print.

== 2007 Re-Release ==
In 2007, Nilaihah Records had the album re-mastered and re-released through its digital download outlets. The updated album is not currently available on CD. In addition to the entire track listing being preserved, the new version also includes 3 remixes of "Metalstorm".

== Track listing ==
1. "Artemis 1" – 2:20
2. "Frantic" – 5:09
3. "Tortoise" – 4:00
4. "Autostation" – 7:03
5. "Black Sun" – 5:03
6. "Artemis 2" – 5:06
7. "Metalstorm" – 4:53
8. "Heaven and Hell" – 4:08
9. "Artemis 3" – 1:43
10. "The Softest Blade" – 6:33
11. "Horizon Orient" – 4:31
12. "Syndrome" – 5:29
13. "Ore" – 4:54

Bonus tracks on 2007 re-release:

- "Metalstorm (GASR Remix)"
- "Metalstorm (Blind Dead Mix by Monoculture)"
- "Metalstorm (HypoFixx Remix)"
