= Distorted Reality =

Distorted Reality
Formation:	1997
Genre:	Electro-industrial
Website:	https://web.archive.org/web/20041130063340/http://distorted-reality.com/
Founder members / current members
Singer:	Martha M. Arce
Keyboard / Synthesizer :	Christian Kobusch

Distorted Reality is a synthpop band from Germany / United States.

== Band history ==
Distorted Reality is the synthpop band formed in 1997 by a collaboration between Martha M. Arce from Miami, United States and Christian Kobusch from Bielefeld, Germany.

Distorted Reality's debut album, The Fine Line Between Love and Hate, was released on 17 May 2002, on Accession Records. The band produced the album along with Bruno Kramm from Das Ich. It also contains re-mixes by Propaganda, Sabotage QCQC and Noyce.

Distorted Reality has also signed with American label Nilaihah Records. The Fine Line Between Love and Hate was released in the US and Canada 13 May 2003. This version contains additional remixes by Assemblage 23, Forma Tadre, Cut.Rate.Box and Null Device.

In 2003 and 2005 Distorted Reality performed live gigs at the Wave-Gotik-Treffen in Leipzig, Germany. In October 2005 Distorted Reality played at the Electronic Pleasures 3 Festival in Berlin, Germany. Further live gigs are planned.

From 2004 to 2006 Martha and Christian worked on their current album ‘Daydreams and Nightmares’, together with the producer Andreas Meyer (Forma Tadre). Remixes from Haujobb, Dust of Basement and In Strict Confidence are included.

== Discography ==
- Daydreams and Nightmares (2006; US/Canada release, Nilaihah Records)
1. Never Change
2. Get a Clue
3. Forever
4. I Am Waiting
5. Those Eyes
6. Tag FÜr Tag
7. Will You Love Me?
8. Something Wicked
9. Into the Night
10. Rebel Yell
11. Something Wicked (In Strict Confidence Remix)
12. Never Change
13. Something Wicked
14. Never Change (Dust Of Basement remix)
15. Will You Love Me? (Sea Of Love Remix By Das Ich)
16. Rebel Yell (Live Mix)
- Daydreams and Nightmares (2006; EU release, Dark Dimsn (Soulfood Music))
- The fine Line between Love and Hate (2002; EU release, Accession Records)
1. Super Crush
2. In my Dream
3. Fever
4. Haunted
5. Your only Jewel
6. You want me, you hate me
7. Hate Factor
8. Sleeper Awaken
9. Fear
10. Drop
11. Fieber
12. In my Dream (The Context Mix) – remix by Propaganda
13. Fear – remix by Sabotage qcqc
14. Dance Factor – remix by Noyce
- The Fine Line between Love and Hate (2003; US/Canada release, Nilaihah Records)
1. Super Crush
2. Fever
3. You Want Me, You Hate Me [split] – remix by Assemblage 23
4. In My Dream
5. Dance Factor – remix by Noyce
6. Drop
7. Haunted
8. You Want Me, You Hate Me
9. In my Dream (The Context Mix) – remix by Propaganda
10. Super Crush (clip) – remix by cut.rate.box
11. Fever (Analog Mix) – remix by Forma Tadre
12. Your Only Jewel
13. Hate Factor
14. Fear – remix by Sabotage qcqc
15. Super Crush (ND Sodium Mix) – remix by Null Device

== Honors ==
- 2002: 4th place ‘Newcomer of the year 2002’ at Grenzwellen.de
