= XP8 =

Italian electronic group

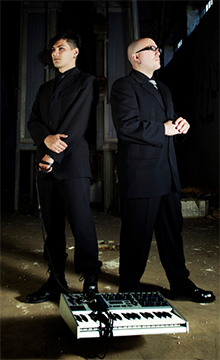
- XP8 in 2011, for "X: A Decade of Decadence" photoshoot.

Background information
- Origin: Rome, Italy
- Genres: Electro; Techno; Synthpop; Futurepop
- Years active: 2001–2014
- Labels: 2393 Records; Infacted Recordings; Metropolis Records (US); Deathwatch Asia (JP)
- Members: Marco Visconti; Marko Resurreccion
- Past members: Paul Toohill
- Website: XP8 Bandcamp

XP8 was an Italian electronic group. The band started in 2001 as a trio, composed of Marco Visconti, Marko Resurreccion, and singer Paul Toohill.

== History ==
The group self-released an album, Forgive on MP3.com. When they signed to the Polish label Black Flames Records, their album was released as Forgive[n] in May 2004. An EP of new material, RE_Productions, was released five months later. In 2005, the band released their second album, Hrs:Min:Sec, on the German label Infacted Recordings. The album peaked at #3 on the German Alternative Charts (DAC).

Toohill left the band in 2007, to work on his solo project, Generator. He is also the main singer for a Nitzer Ebb tribute band called "Muscle And Hate".

Their third album, The Art of Revenge, was released in January 2008 on Infacted. It was also licensed to Sigsaly Transmissions for North America and Gravitator Records for Russia the same year. A music video, the band's first, was produced for the album's title track.

Over the years, the band played all over Europe, from their native Italy to Russia, as well as performing at festivals like Wave-Gotik-Treffen in Germany. In 2008, XP8 also reached US shores for the first time with their live show, supporting System Syn on a one-month promotional tour.

The following year they played at the Kinetik Festival in Canada, and begun working on their fourth studio album Drop The Mask, which was released in early 2010 once again by Infacted Recordings, with the digital-only Want It coming up just a few months before. Straying away from a pure dancefloor sound, the band experimented also with different approaches to electronica, and the album immediately received good praises by the press, consecrating it as the most mature XP8 release to date. Soon afterwards the album was licensed to Metropolis Records for a North American released and peaked at number 1 on the label's mailorder a week before its street date, while a limited digipack edition with a bonus CD was released in Japan by Deathwatch Asia.

XP8 is also well known for their remixes, having reworked tracks of several other bands, including Steve Aoki, Attrition, Mortiis, and Icon of Coil, and countless others.

In 2013, XP8 released the crowd-funded concept album Adrenochrome, which they described as their best effort to date, without any record label support.

Everything came to a grinding halt in 2014 when the band decided to disband, quoting various reasons for this decision, among them the dwindling interest in alternative/industrial dance music, a trend that had a long run for almost two decades but that eventually ran dry. In an interview, Visconti also stated that “[...] no one wants to be the old guy in a room full of kids looking at you like a dinosaur: I remember vividly making fun of those old goths that simply didn’t want to get the fuck out of MY clubs a decade ago, and the last thing I wanted to become was one of them.” - clearly pointing out the necessity to make space for a younger generation to make things vital and vibrant once again.

Before disbanding, XP8 released a series of 3 EPs over a period of 9 months, each released tied to one of the phases of the Alchemical process: the three releases went on to be praised as the band's best material by critics and fans alike, proving how the Italian duo left a mark on the industrial scene for years and years to come. Steven Gullotta at Brutal Resonance stated that "XP8 may be dead, but their music will forever hold a place within my soul", giving the band a good send off.

In 2021, celebrating the 20th anniversary of the project, Visconti and Resurreccion resurrected it for a one-off release, TWENTY.

== Discography ==
=== Studio albums ===
- Forgive (2003, download)
- Forgive[n] (2004, Black Flames Records)
- Hrs:Min:Sec (2005, Infacted Recordings / Nilaihah Records)
- The Art of Revenge (2008, Infacted Recordings / Sigsaly Transmissions / Gravitator Records)
- Drop The Mask (2010, Infacted Recordings / Metropolis Records)
- Drop The Mask (Limited 2CD Digipack Japanese Edition) (2010, Deathwatch Asia)
- X: A Decade Of Decadence (2011, 2393 Records / Deathwatch Asia)
- Adrenochrome (2013, 2393 Records)

=== EPs ===
- RE_Productions (2004, Black Flames Records)
- Synthphony REMIXed! Vol.4 (2005, Synthphony Records)
- Infaction Two EP (2006, Infacted Recordings)
- Fouplay Vol.1 EP (2006, Nilaihah Records)
- Want It (2009, Infacted Recordings)
- Still Frames (2011, 2393 Records)
- Burning Down (2012, 2393 Records)
- Meathead's Lost HD (2013, 2393 Records)
- One Of Three: Nigredo (2014, 2393 Records)
- Two Of Three: Albedo (2014, 2393 Records)
- Three Of Three: Rubedo (2015, 2393 Records)
- TWENTY (2021, 2393 Records)

=== Compilations ===
- The Definitive XPerience: 2001 - 2016 (2016, 2393 Records)
