= Angels in Disguise (album) =

Studio album by Interface
- Released: July 2002
- Recorded: Fall 2001–winter 2002
- Genre: Futurepop, electro-industrial
- Length: 71:49
- Label: Tinman
- Producer: Eric Eldredge

Interface chronology
The Artemis Complex (1999)	Angels in Disguise (2002)	Beyond Humanity (2006)

Angels in Disguise is the second album released by Interface, and considered by many of its fans as its best to date. Clocking in at over 71 minutes, the album spans many different styles, from electro-industrial to trance to synthpop, with traces of trip hop and jungle for good measure. As with the debut album, it was almost entirely produced and performed by Eric Eldredge. It was released by Tinman Records on July 15, 2002.

Critics in magazines such as Industrial Nation, Side Line, and Outburn were highly taken with the album's overall positive imagery, which is uncommon in this genre. Part of the reason behind the vast improvements in the band's sound was the major upgrades Eldredge did to Interface's studio in the three-plus years between albums. The album produced several club ready tracks, such as "Wasted Time", "Ability", "Temperature", and the title track, all of which found their way onto playlists of many dance clubs, radio stations, webcasts, and podcasts.

Additional personnel on the album included live keyboardist Jon Billian and live guitarist/keyboardist Evan Eldredge (both of whom became official members in 2003) on various tracks. Mike Hoffman and Matt Clennan of fellow New York EBM band Final Project were guest vocalists on "You Will Learn", and Jaki Neko of New Jersey Gothic band Murder in the Dark sang lead vocals on "Labyrinth". The album's cover was designed by graphic artist Michelle Lee.

Two tracks from the album, "Wasted Time" and "Angels in Disguise", were released separately as EPs. In late 2005, Tinman went out of business and Interface signed with Nilaihah Records, who took over distribution of Interface's Tinman releases, including this album. Remixes of "Wasted Time" and "Clear Night" appear on the subsequent release Beyond Humanity. Interface re-released the album for its 20th anniversary.

== Track listing ==
1. "Wasted Time" – 5:56
2. "You Will Learn" – 3:43
3. "Movement (In)" – 1:58
4. "Ability" – 3:59
5. "Inside" – 4:29
6. "Temperature" – 5:29
7. "Katja" – 5:19
8. "Maximum Formula" – 6:36
9. "Sublimated" – 1:36
10. "Colors" – 4:44
11. "Within Your Reach" – 3:10
12. "Angels in Disguise" – 4:33
13. "Labyrinth" – 4:30
14. "Movement (Out)" – 3:03
15. "Clear Night (with hidden track)" – 12:37
