= Lestat (band) =

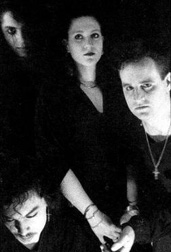
- Lestat in 1991

Background information
- Origin: Cleveland, Ohio, United States
- Genres: Gothic rock; industrial; dark wave
- Years active: 1988–2000, 2010-2014
- Labels: Nilaihah Records, Formerly Jevan Records
- Website: www.lestatmusic.com

Lestat was an American gothic rock band from Cleveland, Ohio.

== History ==
=== Theatre of the Vampires (1988–1991) ===
The group was founded by Evan Nave (then known as Razz) and Jess in Cleveland in 1988. In an interview, they claim to be one of the earliest performers of Dark Wave music. "We tried to create a more harmonic style of Goth," says Nave. "Creating moody soundtracks and turning them into songs." The two were later joined by Susan and former members Peter and Richard. The group's first release, titled Theatre of the Vampires, was a 6 track LP (available only on cassette and now out of print), released in 1990 on Jevan records.

=== Grave Desires (1991–1994) ===
During the time that Lestat was promoting their first release, Timothy was in another band in Cleveland at the time called Nation of Teflon Souls, which he left to become Lestat's full-time drummer. At this time, Peter and Richard left the band. When the band began writing their next release, they were now a four-piece, featuring Evan (Razz), Jess, Susan and Timothy. They began creating a sound heavier with industrial elements brought by Timothy and darker lyrics. In 1991, Lestat released their second cassette LP entitled Grave Desires on Jevan Records. The release consisted of 8 original tracks.

=== Vision of Sorrows (1994–1998) ===
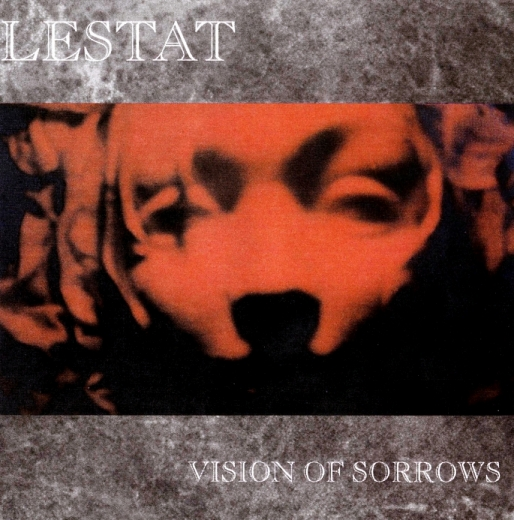
Vision of Sorrows cover art (1994).

When writing the material for their third release, Lestat took a slightly different direction with their sound. Less thundering and industrial, their sound bent more toward floating beautiful tones and harmonies. The overall feel of their music was the same melancholy despair and dark themes, but less experimental and harsh. They were also cognizant of the fact that this would be their first CD release, so more care was taken to craft their art and ready the songs for the digital world. At the same time, Lestat was working with their acts on Jevan Records, releasing new Bath and Fragment material.

When Vision of Sorrows was released in 1994, Lestat took a bold move and held their release show at the Cleveland Agora, a larger venue than they were used to playing. During this time, they also continued to travel to different cities, even playing in Chicago for the 100th anniversary of the writing of Bram Stoker’s Dracula. They also had their track “?” included on the Cleopatra Records Goth Box compilation (Cleopatra [CLP 9798-2], 1996).

In 1995, Lestat would release a 12 track compilation CD entitled One through Jevan Records, featuring all three acts on the label. Two of the tracks on the CD were remixed versions of earlier Lestat songs Realm and FallnAngel, along with a new song written for the release entitled Fate. This release would be the last release for Jevan Records. Also in 1995, Lestat performed at the first annual Convergence alt.gothic festival in Chicago alongside bands such as Mephisto Walz, Lycia, The Wake, and Sunshine Blind.

During this time, author Eric Muss-Barnes published The Gothic Rainbow: Beginning Volume of the Vampire Noctuaries (1997) which is said to be loosely based on the members of the band Lestat and the Cleveland music scene at that time.

=== Once Before I Die (1998–2000) ===
After the release of Vision of Sorrows, Lestat began writing material for a new release, but inspiration was not easily found. Writing blocks, outside influences and creative differences were taking their toll. An attempt to inject new life into the band resulted in auditions for a female vocal presence. After many auditions, Dawn was chosen and four tracks were written for a new release entitled Once Before I Die. However, that release would never see the light of day, as in 2000 the band decided to go their separate ways in an amicable split.

=== Lestat No More (2000–2010) ===
In the 10 years that followed, each member of Lestat continued through life in their own way. Susan and Jess no longer performed musically. Timothy formed electronic band UV, and continued performing, even having two songs picked up for the Matrix Trilogy box set. Razz, now known as Evan Nave, founded the Cleveland area metal band PKS (then known as Planet Killswitch) with fellow bassist War. PKS released two full-length CD’s and performed until the year 2010, when they also split amicably.

=== Arisen (2010–2014) ===
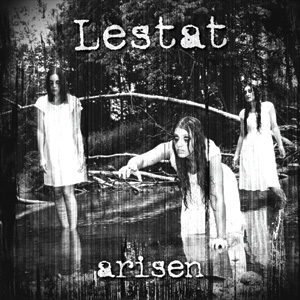
Cover art for Arisen (2012).

In 2010, after the split of PKS, Evan Nave decided that Lestat had never really gotten to a level that he had always wanted to see it rise to. Timothy and Evan had discussed reunion shows before, but Evan was ready for something much more daring and bold. After meeting with each member of the band, the decision was made to not only perform a reunion show, but to write a new release and continue on where the band had left off. Susan and Timothy quickly rejoined Lestat, but Jess politely refused, not wanting to perform musically any longer. He was, however, instrumental in assisting Lestat with the re-release of their original material as downloads for the new digital world. Evan worked with their original engineer and Jess, as well as the company who originally pressed their first releases to re-master and re-release all of their original songs, including the remixes and Fate from their compilation CD.

In an even bolder move, Lestat brought in two new musicians to bring their sound into the new era. War, former bassist for Evan’s band PKS and Scott, former drummer for the band Disown, were invited to join. They brought with them a new organic take to Lestat’s previously electronic heavy sound. For a full year, the band worked to mesh their unique sounds by reworking Lestat’s original material. When they felt ready, they wrote their first new material in over a decade, and performed a reunion show in August 2010 in their hometown of Cleveland, Ohio.

For the year that followed, Lestat began taking advantage of social media, all but non-existent during their first tenure, creating pages on Facebook, MySpace and their own Lestatmusic.com. They began to get the word out of their return, and started touring the country, visiting cities that they had never gotten to perform in such as Miami and Detroit. In 2011, Lestat had their first visit to California, playing San Jose, San Diego, Los Angeles and the Shadowdance festival in Oakland.

While touring, Lestat began feverishly writing material for their first full-length CD since 1994. The decision was made to re-recreate Red Light using the new band members as a tribute to how far they had come. They also had the pleasure of working closely with Adrian Smith of the classic industrial band Click Click. Adrian gave them his blessing to cover their song Awake and Watching, and remixed the song Midnight Toll for them for their release.

In April 2012, Lestat released Arisen, now signed to Columbus-based label Nilaihah Records. They performed at the Age of Decay festival in Jacksonville, Florida as well as New York City once more. Lestat also performed at the Anne Rice Vampire Lestat Fan Club Coven’s Ball in New Orleans, LA on October 26 of 2012.

In January 2013, Timothy left the band for personal and musical aspirations, leaving the band as a four-piece.

The band announced they would be disbanding once more in their official Facebook page on October 2, 2014. On Nov 22, 2023 after nine years, a one off appearance from the band took place at The Foundry Concert Club in Lakewood, Ohio.

== Discography ==
- Theatre of the Vampires (1990 – Jevan Records)
- Grave Desires (1991 – Jevan Records)
- Vision of Sorrows (1994 – Jevan Records)
- One (1995 – Jevan Records)
- Arisen (2012 – Nilaihah Records)

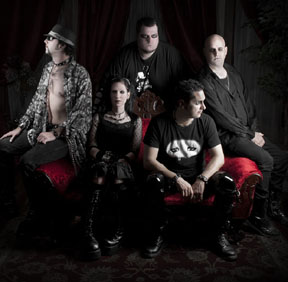
Scott, Susan, War, Nave, Timothy. Lestat in 2012.

== Members ==
- Dawn – vocals (1998–2000)
- Evan Nave – lead vocals, lyricist, keys, sampling, founding member (1988–2014)
- Jess – keys, backing vocals, founding member (1988–2000)
- Peter – keys (1988–1991)
- Richard – keys (1988–1991)
- Scott – drums (2010–2014)
- Susan – guitars, backing vocals, founding member (1988–2014)
- Timothy – keys, drum programming, sampling, backing vocals (1991–2012)
- War – bass guitar (2010–2014)

== Jevan Records ==
Jevan Records was an American independent record label based in Parma, Ohio between 1990 and 2000 founded by members of the band Lestat with the focus on promoting Cleveland electro, industrial and goth music artists. Jevan Records helped release the following albums under its tutelage:

- Lestat - Theatre of The Vampires (1990), Grave Desires (1991) and Vision of Sorrows (1994)
- Fragment - Sura (1995)
- Bath - Fools (1996), N-Graver I & II (1998)
