= New Ben Franklins =

American band

- Origin: Denver, Colorado
- Genres: Alternative rock, Americana
- Years active: 1992–1997, 2008–present
- Labels: Rainless Records, Dingo's Kidney, Iota Records
- Members: David DeVoe; Jeremy Ziehe; Damon Smith
- Past members: Andy Harris; Malcolm Tent; George Edwards; Bert Hamlin; David Meyer; Mark Kosta; Tom Oberheide; Benjamin Williams; Graham Armer; Heath Kopp; Carleton Pike; Daniel Sawyer; Tom Radigan; Greg Pasquariello; Jon Dennis; Bobby Taylor
- Website: newbenfranklins.com

New Ben Franklins are a Rock’n’Roll/Americana/Alternative Country band based in Denver, Colorado, USA. The band was formed in 1992 around the songwriting of principal member David DeVoe. New Ben Franklins are active currently in the Colorado music scene, continuing to record albums and perform live.

== Biography ==
=== Early years ===
In fall of 1991, David DeVoe drove out to California to bring back his childhood friend Malcolm Tent, who had been living in the San Francisco bay area for the previous few years. On their drive back they decided to put together a band in the Denver scene. Recruiting Andy Harris, who worked with DeVoe at a local record shop, to play bass guitar, the band began their life as a 3-piece backed by a drum machine. Initially, the band's intention was to make music in the vein of The Sisters of Mercy and Red Lorry Yellow Lorry. The band began playing shows in the Denver area and released their first cassette, titled Blake. The band also included a version of the Adam And The Ants' song “Ants Invasion” on the EP, a song that was also staple of their early live sets along with covers from the likes of Love & Rockets, Ricky Nelson, and The Rolling Stones.

Continuing to play in the Denver scene, the band replaced their drum machine with local drummer George Edwards. The band self-recorded and produced their second cassette release, No Songs For Christine, in 1993, with vocal duties split fairly evenly between Tent and DeVoe, foreshadowing the departure of Tent from the band's line up late in 1993. The freedom of performing as a 3-piece led to new experimentation with sound and songwriting and in mid-summer 1994 the band released their third cassette, Deaf Child Blind, also recorded and produced by DeVoe at his Dingo's Kidney Studios with the help of Michael Smith (Fiction 8).

=== Late 90s/2000s ===
In 1996, New Ben Franklins slowed their live schedule due to lineup changes. DeVoe continued to write and record songs, aided most of the time by George Edwards and other friends from the Denver scene. In 1997, DeVoe moved to Alaska, effectively ending the Franklins' activity for several years.

By the mid-2000s, DeVoe had returned to Colorado and, after playing as auxiliary guitarist on a couple of west-coast tours with friends' bands, he returned to writing for the Franklins. He recruited drummer Mark Kosta and bassist David Meyer for the new incarnation of the band, and they immediately began playing shows around the Colorado Front Range.

=== Americana years ===
In mid 2008, a mutual friend introduced steel guitar player Tom Oberheide to DeVoe, bringing DeVoe's new focus on playing “shoegazer noise rock with twang” into clearer focus. DeVoe's songwriting and musical history relied heavily on a classic country influence, and the band's new sound was enhanced with the addition of the steel guitar. The band also began planning and performing an annual Waylon Jennings tribute show every February, near the anniversary of the singer's death.

In 2009, the band released their first CD of the new millennium, simply titled EP. The follow-up release in early 2011 was titled Miserable, and featured Benjamin Williams on bass guitar, replacing David Meyer in the band's line up. The band spent most of 2011 playing shows and recording their 14-song album titled [peter gabriel], which was released in April 2012. Soon after the album's release Tom Oberheide left the band and was replaced by Graham Armer on second guitar.

The next few years found the band going through a few lineup changes and releasing new recordings on various compilations. In early 2014, the band joined the non-profit music co-op Rainless Records.

In March 2017, the band released What Happens When Things Fall Apart. The album was written and recorded by DeVoe with a cast of 5 different bass players and 8 different drummers. It is a dark and brooding album, one that recalls the band's earliest works.

In November 2023, the band released Existential Dread Capricious Joy, an album 6 years in the making. This album continued the darker bent in the Franklins' music, gathering together songs that had existed before the global pandemic and written during those years. The band had recorded piece by piece during the pandemic, gathering some 23 songs for the album, which pulled back to a sprawling 15-song opus at release. Songs about the suicide of close friends mix strangely with songs about the birth of DeVoe's son, as well as the effect the pandemic had on each of our lives. The tracks not released on EDCJ will likely become parts of upcoming EPs.

=== Discography ===
Blake EP [1992] Iota records
No Songs For Christine [1993] Iota records
Deaf Child Blind [1994] Dingo's Kidney
EP [2009] Dingo's Kidney
Miserable [2011] Dingo's Kidney
[peter gabriel] [2012] Dingo's Kidney
Something Old Something New [2015] Dingo's Kidney
Something Borrowed Something Blue [2015] Dingo's Kidney
What Happens When Things Fall Apart [2017] Dingo's Kidney
Existential Dread Capricious Joy [2023] Dingo's Kidney

==== Compilation appearances ====
Catherine Wheel Cover Compilation (“Something Strange” and “Salt”)
This Ain’t No Cowtown Vol. 1 [2011]
Kings Of The Queen City Vol. 1 [2013]
Rainless Records Volume 1 [2014]

==== Soundtrack appearances ====
The Creep Behind The Camera ("Whatever Happened To What's His Name?) [2015]
Derby Baby ("Miserable") [2012]
