= The Azoic =

American electronic dance band

- Origin: Columbus, OH, USA
- Genres: EBM
- Years active: 1996–present
- Labels: Nilaihah; Infacted
- Members: Kristy Venrick; Eric Eldredge; Nikademus
- Past members: Shawn Lower; Steve Laskarides
- Website: The Azoic (archived)

The Azoic is an electronic music band that was formed in Columbus, Ohio in February 1996.

== History ==
In October 1996, they received a record contract from Worm Records and released their first CD, The Divine Suffering, in April 1997. Shawn left the band in early 1998 to pursue an alternate musical direction. Their second CD, Where Broken Angels Lie, was released in May 1998 with Nilaihah Records, which was started by Kristy to promote talented, original electronic bands. Forward, The Azoic's third CD, was released on Nilaihah Records in 2001. They also released the Conflict EP in 2003 on Nilaihah Records and a video for the title track on YouTube. In 2003, the band signed a record deal throughout Europe with Infacted Recordings of Germany.

In 2004, Infacted released Forward+Conflict, which went to the fourth spot on the DAC and number 2 on the DUC Dutch Alternative Chart. That release completely sold out within 6 months. The Azoic's 4th CD, Illuminate, was released in 2004 on Nilaihah Records and Infacted Recordings (Europe). Xbox (Konami/Microsoft) released their hit game Dance Dance Revolution Ultramix 3; in March 2005 which featured The Azoic track "Conflict (Turmoil Mix)." In early 2008, Re:Illumination [the mixes] came out on Nilaihah Records. The album holds remixed version of "Illuminate" material by DJ Delobbo, GASR, Null Device, Hungry Lucy, and more. In late 2012, The Azoic released a video for "Corruption" on YouTube and in early 2013, they released an album on Nilaihah Records also called Corruption.

== Members ==
- Kristy Venrick (1996–present)- Based in Columbus, Ohio, she is responsible for vocals, lyrics, melody, keyboards, and programming.
- Andreas Kleinert (2008–present) - Based in Columbus, Ohio, he is responsible for melodies, programming, guitar and keyboards
- Nikademus (2012–present) - Based in Bangor, Maine, he is responsible for some production and mastering.
- Lawrence Zalewski (2008–present)- Based in Columbus, Ohio, he is responsible for live keyboards, guitar, and video.
- Eric Eldredge (2008–present)- Based in New York City, New York, live keyboards.
- Steve Laskarides (1996-2006) - His contributions were music, keyboard, programming, effects, some vocals and some lyrics. He is in a band called Access Zero.
- Shawn Lower (1996–1998) - He is in a band called Only Flesh.

== Discography ==
=== Albums ===
- the divine suffering (1997), Worm Records
- Where Broken Angels Lie (1998), Nilaihah Records
- forward... (2001), Nilaihah Records
- Illuminate (2004), Nilaihah Records and Infacted Recordings
- Re: Illuminated (The Mixes) (2008), Nilaihah Records

=== Singles & EPs ===
- Conflict (2003), Nilaihah Records
- Corruption (2013), Nilaihah Records

=== Compilations ===
- Forward + Conflict (2004), Infacted Recordings
- Unreleased & Exclusive Rarities (2013), self-release
