= Malka Mikkelsen =

Colombian-American musician (born 1973)

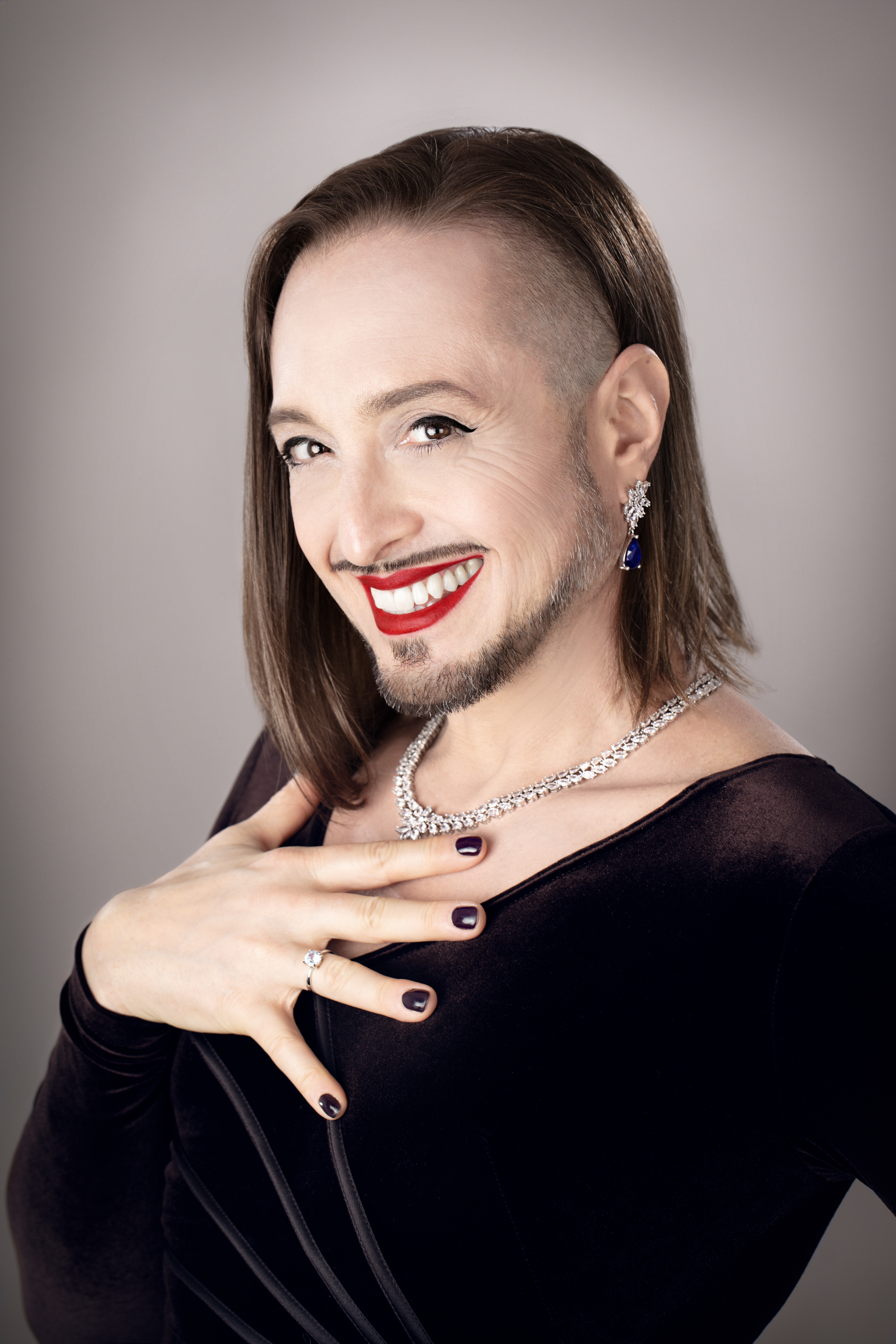
- Mikkelsen in 2025
- Born: Dicken Schrader Forero; December 4, 1973 (age 52); Bogotá, Colombia
- Education: Florida International University
- Occupations: Creative director; director; Video Artist; Musician
- Years active: 1995–present
- Musical career
- Genres: Pop; Electronic; Experimental
- Instruments: Vocals; Keyboards; Ukulele; Xylophone; Melodica; Kazoo; Percussion
- Formerly of: DMK

Malka Mikkelsen Forero (born Dicken Schrader Forero; December 4, 1973) is a Colombian–American creative director, director, video artist and musician. They are most noted for their YouTube viral videos featuring themself and their two children, Milah and Korben, performing cover versions of Depeche Mode songs using an old keyboard and various toys and household items as instruments, under the name DMK. Mikkelsen and their children are featured in the film Spirits in the Forest, directed by Anton Corbijn. Mikkelsen came out as non-binary in March 2025 and legally changed their name and gender marker on November 27, 2025.

== Early life ==
Mikkelsen was born Dicken Schrader in Bogotá, Colombia. They are the son of María Eugenia Forero and Christian Schrader, Dean of the Jorge Tadeo Lozano University School of Advertising. Since early age, they showed interest in video production and animation. They graduated from Liceo Boston high school in 1991, and was immediately drafted into the National Army of Colombia, where they served as part of the Multinational Force and Observers in the Sinai Peninsula. In 1993 Mikkelsen moved to Miami, Florida, to study journalism and mass communication at Florida International University, graduating magna cum laude in December 1996.

== Career ==
Mikkelsen's career launched in 1995, as a writer/producer for MTV Latin America, first producing popular shows like Ozono, Playa and Conexión, and later working in the on-air promos department. During their time at MTV he created memorable spots, some of them leading MTV Latin America into winning the Judge's Choice award at the 1999 PromaxBDA Latin America Awards.

After working in the on-air promotions department of several other cable channels airing in Latin America, like HTV and AXN, in 2004 they moved with his family to New York City to work as a Writer/Producer for VH1 promos and later as Creative Director for Vh1 digital. At Vh1 they created and directed campaigns for shows like Metal Month, Save The Music, Rock Honors and Hip-Hop Honors, the latter winning the Judge's Choice award at the 2006 PromaxBDA US Awards.

On 2007, Mikkelsen participated, as part of N Pictures, in the 48 Hour Film Project held in Miami, writing and editing the short "A Monkton Family Christmas" which won Best Film of 2007 and went to represent Miami/Ft. Lauderdale at Filmapalooza 2008.

Mikkelsen moved back to Colombia in 2009, where they took a job as Creative Director at G2, to later start their own video production/post-production company called Bualá, where they directed award-winning campaigns and video content for local and international clients like MTV, Discovery Networks, Coca-Cola, adidas, Samsung, Huawei, McDonald's, Abbott Laboratories, One Young World, Caracol Televisión, Bavaria Brewery, Juan Valdez Café and many more.

Bualá, led by Mikkelsen, won silver prize for animation at the 2015 World Media Festival, Hamburg, and their video mapping entry was chosen as finalist at the 2019 George Town festival in Penang, Malaysia. That same year, Mikkelsen moved back to New York City, where they currently work and reside.

Mikkelsen has also directed music videos for Puerto rican band Circo and Colombian bands Pirañas and Árbol de Ojos.

== DMK ==
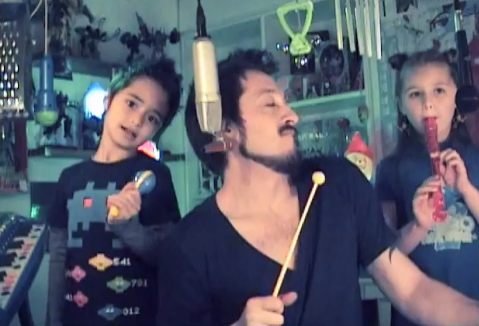
Malka Mikkelsen performing Depeche Mode's "Everything Counts" with their children, Korben and Milah, in 2011.

Mikkelsen had been a Depeche Mode fan since they first heard them in 1987. In late 2010, as they were going through the separation from their first wife, they decided to recreate their 1985 classic "Shake the Disease" and invited their children Milah, then 7, and Korben, then 4, to participate. The video was followed by a second Depeche Mode cover in mid-2011, "Strangelove" and by a third in late-2011 "Everything Counts". This video was suddenly picked up by news outlets and blogs around the world and it quickly went viral in late January 2012, becoming an internet sensation.

In February 2012, the band adopted the name DMK, which stands for "Depeche Mode Kids" but also refers to the initials of the band members' names at the time (Dicken, Milah, and Korben).

They have been nominated for "Favorite Web Personality" at the 2015 Nickelodeon Kids' Choice Awards Colombia, featured in MTV Iggy's "10 Colombian bands on the rise" article, and in Ultimate Guitar´s list of 10 weirdest cover bands, and their remake of "Everything Counts" has been noted by The Atlantic as one of the most transformative cover songs and by Electronic Beats as one of the ten best Depeche Mode covers ever made.

Since their viral success, DMK have been invited to perform in front of live audiences in Colombia, the United States, Spain, Poland and Germany.

On March 20, 2017, Mikkelsen was chosen to take over Depeche Mode's Facebook page as part of the Takeover campaign, becoming one of Martin Gore's favorite entries, and on March 16, 2018, they finally met Depeche Mode at a meet-and-greet in Bogotá during the band's Global Spirit Tour.

As of March 2025, DMK have covered ten Depeche Mode songs: "Shake the Disease", "Strangelove", "Everything Counts", "Black Celebration", "Enjoy the Silence", "Just Can't Get Enough", "But Not Tonight", "The Meaning of Love" "Personal Jesus". and "Precious." They have also released an original composition entitled "Pale Blue Dot" inspired on Carl Sagan's famous reflection on the photograph taken by the Voyager 1 space probe.

On November 21, 2019, Spirits in the Forest was released in theaters worldwide, featuring the stories of six life-long Depeche Mode fans, including Mikkelsen and DMK.

On February 26, 2022, DMK released their last video, "Enjoy the Silence '22" and announced their decision of going into "permanent hiatus" through an online Zoom event hosted by the Depeche Mode Global Fan Club, and on December of the same year they released their only album, Songs of Tiny Devotion: A Family Tribute to Depeche Mode 2010–2022, compiling all of the covers they created during the past 12 years plus an original song. The album was released on all major music streaming services including Spotify, Apple Music, iTunes, Amazon Music, and Pandora.

== Filmography ==
=== Short film ===
Title	Year	Client	Director	Writer	Editor / Post-producer	Notes
A Monkton Family Christmas	2007			Yes	Yes	Winner, Best Short Film, 48-Hour Film Project, Miami/Ft. Lauderdale

=== Production ===
- MTV Latin America – Conexión MTV (1996–1999)
- MTV Latin America – "Ozono" (1997–1999)
- MTV Latin America – "Playa MTV" (1997–1999)
- MTV Latin America – "Mastermix" (1997–1999)
- MTV Latin America – "Rendez-Vous" (1998–1999)
- Equinox Media – SoulCycle Season 2 (2020)

=== Advertisement ===
- MTV Latin America – "Noticias MTV" (1999)
- MTV Latin America – "Animación MTV" (1999)
- MTV Latin America – "Space Invaders Weekend Especial" (1999) – Winner, Best Design for On-Air Graphics, PromaxBDA Latin America 1999. Winner, Judges' Choice Award, PromaxBDA Latin America 1999.
- MTV Latin America / Kodak– "¿Tienes memoria fotográfica?" (1999) – Winner, Best Audio for a Promo, PromaxBDA Latin America 1999.
- MTV Latin America – "Molotov Weekend Especial" (1999)
- MTV Latin America – "Sexxx Weekend" (1999) – Winner, Best Design for On-Air Logo, PromaxBDA Latin America 2000.
- MTV Latin America / Telemundo – "MTV en Telemundo" (1999)
- MTV Latin America – "Paparazzi" (1999)
- MTV Latin America – "Obsesiones" (1999)
- Loquesea.com – "Buscando a Gloria Trevi" (2001) – Winner, Most Effective Campaign, Effectiveness in Advertising Awards, 2002.
- Loquesea.com – "Candidato Pantera" (2001)
- Loquesea.com – "Somos Bytes" (2001)
- MTV International – "Netbaby" (2001)
- HTV – "Señor H" (2001)
- HTV – "Artista del Mes" (2001)
- AXN – "Gravity Games" (2002)
- AXN – "31x31" (2002)
- AXN – "World Stunt Awards" (2003)
- Vh1 – "Sing a Song" (2004) – Special judge's mention, PromaxBDA US 2005.
- Vh1 – "Gay Pride Week" (2005)
- Vh1 – "Save The Music" (2005)
- Vh1 – "Hip-Hop Honors" (2005) -Winner, Judges' Choice Award, PromaxBDA US 2006.
- Vh1 – "I Love the 70's Volume 2" (2006)
- Vh1 – "Rock Honors" (2006)
- Vh1 – "Music Good" (2006)
- Vh1 – "Big in '06" (2006)
- Vh1 – "Metal Month" (2006)
- Shock Magazine – "Episodic Spots" (2011–2015)
- Cromos – "Interesante, muy interesante" (2013)
- McDonald's Costa Rica – "Free Coffee" (2013)
- Premios Shock – "Tune-In" (2013–2018)
- Nivea México – "Sweat" (2013)
- Visa Inc. México – "Check-In" (2014)
- Viacom International / International Labour Organization – "A Call to Action" (2014) – Winner, Silver. Best 3D Film, World Media Festival, 2015.
- Visa Inc. México – "Visa Points" (2015)
- Local Measure – "Infographic Spot" (2016)
- Bayer México – "Canestén" (2016)
- Caracol Televisión – "Reel 2016" (2016)
- Locatel Colombia – "TV Spot" (2016)
- Caracol Televisión – "Caracol V.I.P." (2016)
- William Lawson's Whiskey – "Success Story" (2017)
- Jumbo Chocolate – "Jumbo Sessions" (2017)
- Cámara de Comercio de Bogotá – "Ágora" (2017)
- Coca-Cola Colombia – "A Christmas Message" (2017)
- KPMG Colombia – "The Future" (2017)
- Bavaria Brewery – "Corporate Video" (2018)
- Plan International – "Corporate Video" (2018)
- Shock / Amuse – "Guía del Músico Independiente" (2019)
- Deezer – "Together We Make Magic" campaign (2019)
- Comedy Central – "Dark Humor" Tune-in spot (2021)
- Comedy Central – "Patrice O'Neal: Killing is Easy" Tune-in spot (2021)
- Screen Actors Guild Awards – Nominee montage (2021)
- Univision – Upfront Sizzle Reel (2021)
- Universal Music Group/Def Jam Records – Snoop Dogg's Announcement Video (2021)
- FX – "Archer on Hulu" Tune-in Spot (2021)
- Univision – Sales video (2022)
- Microsoft Advertising - Promotional video (2022)
- Bayer - Starmind launch teaser (2022)
- Shell - Shell superhub promootional video (2023)
- Pfizer - COVID-19 Vaccine case study video (2023)
- Apple - Supply chain internal video (2023)
- Jaguar Land Rover - "Modern Luxury Experience" Promotional video (2023)
- Johnson & Johnson - Release automation teaser (2024)
- TCS - "Next is Now" Promotional video (2024)

=== 3D Mapping Shows ===
- adidas / Millonarios F.C. – "New Uniform Event" (2016)
- One Young World – "OYW Bogotá Inauguration Ceremony" (2017)
- Schwarzkopf – "Beology" (2017)
- Paribas – "Welcome to Colombia" (2017)
- Comfacesar – "Convention Center Inauguration Ceremony" (2017)
- Samsung – "Galaxy M20 Launch" (2017)
- Nestlé / Pacific Alliance – "Inauguration Ceremony" (2018)
- FIFA – "World Summit Bogotá" (2018)
- Huawei – "Huawei P30 Launch" (2018)
- George Town Festival, Malaysia – "The Colors of George Town" (2019) – Finalist, George Town 3D Mapping Festival, Malaysia, 2019.

=== Music Videos/Visual Shows ===
- El Beso – Circo (2002)
- Shake The Disease – DMK (2010)
- Strangelove – DMK (2011)
- Everything Counts – DMK (2011)
- Black Celebration – DMK (2012)
- Enjoy The Silence – DMK (2012)
- Just Can't Get Enough – DMK (2013)
- But Not Tonight – DMK (2014)
- Shock/Tigo Awards Visual Show – Caracol Television (2014)
- Pale Blue Dot – DMK (2015)
- Regular Visual Show – Árbol de Ojos (2015)
- Todo Va A Estar Bien Lyric Video – Árbol de Ojos (2015)
- Live in Poland– DMK (2016)
- The Meaning Of Love – DMK (2017)
- Soy Como Tú – Pirañas (2017)
- Personal Jesus – DMK (2018)
- Live in NYC – DMK (2019)
- Precious – DMK (2020)
- Enjoy The Silence '22 – DMK (2022)
- Fifty - Chupacobres and 50 Pesos (2023)

== Awards and recognition ==
=== PromaxBDA Awards Latin America ===
==== Best Audio for a Promo ====
Year	Nominated work	Result
1999	Kodak/Conexión MTV – MTV Latin America	Won

==== Best Design for On-Air Graphics ====
Year	Nominated work	Result
1999	MTV Space Invaders Weekend Especial – MTV Latin America	Won

==== Judge's Choice Award ====
Year	Nominated work	Result
1999	MTV Space Invaders Weekend Especial – MTV Latin America	Won

==== Best Design for On-Air Logo ====
Year	Nominated work	Result
2000	MTV Sexxx Weekend – MTV Latin America	Won

=== Effectiveness in Advertising Awards ===
==== Best Campaign for Digital Media ====
Year	Nominated work	Result
2002	"Buscando a Gloria Trevi" – loquesea.com	Won

=== PromaxBDA Awards US ===
==== Special Jury Mention ====
Year	Nominated work	Result
2005	Sing a Song – Vh1 US	Nominated
2008	"Yeah"' – Vh1 Classic	Nominated

==== Judge's Choice Award ====
Year	Nominated work	Result
2006	Hip Hop Honors 2005 – Vh1 US	Won

=== 48-Hour Film Project ===
==== Best film ====
Year	Nominated work	Result
2007	"A Monkton Family Christmas"	Won

==== Best Film and Best Screenwriting ====
Year	Nominated work	Result
2007	"A Monkton Family Christmas"	Won

=== World Media Festival ===
==== Best 3D film ====
Year	Nominated work	Result
2015	"International Labour Organization: A Call to Action" – MTV International	Won

=== Nickelodeon Kids' Choice Awards ===
==== Favorite Web Personality ====
Year	Nominated work	Result
2015	" Favorite Web Personality" – Nickelodeon Kids' Choice Awards	Nominated

=== George Town Festival, Malaysia ===
==== 3D Mapping ====
Year	Nominated work	Result
2019	" Best 3D Mapping Show" – George Town 3D Mapping Festival	Won
