= Grave Desires =

- Original cover art.

Studio album by Lestat
- Released: 1991
- Recorded: 1991
- Genre: Darkwave, Gothic
- Length: 32:36
- Label: Independent (Formerly Jevan Records)
- Producer: Lestat

Grave Desires is a 1991 album by the band Lestat. This release was available only on cassette and is currently out of physical print. It wasn't until 2010 that the full album would be available through digital distribution. Grave Desires was originally released by Jevan Records. This release marked the arrival of Timothy to the band.

== Track listing ==
No.	Title	Length
1.	"X-TACY"	4:02
2.	"Desecrate"	5:35
3.	"Grave Desires"	3:33
4.	"Le Cri De Coeur"	3:47
5.	"Inside a Dream"	2:32
6.	"Endparty"	3:59
7.	"Pray for the Living"	4:42
8.	"Syndrome"	4:23

== Credits ==
- Razz (Evan Nave) - Vocals, Drum Programming and Keys
- Susan - Guitar and Backing Vocals
- Jess - Keys and Backing Vocals
- Timothy - Drums and Drum Programming
