= Textbeak =

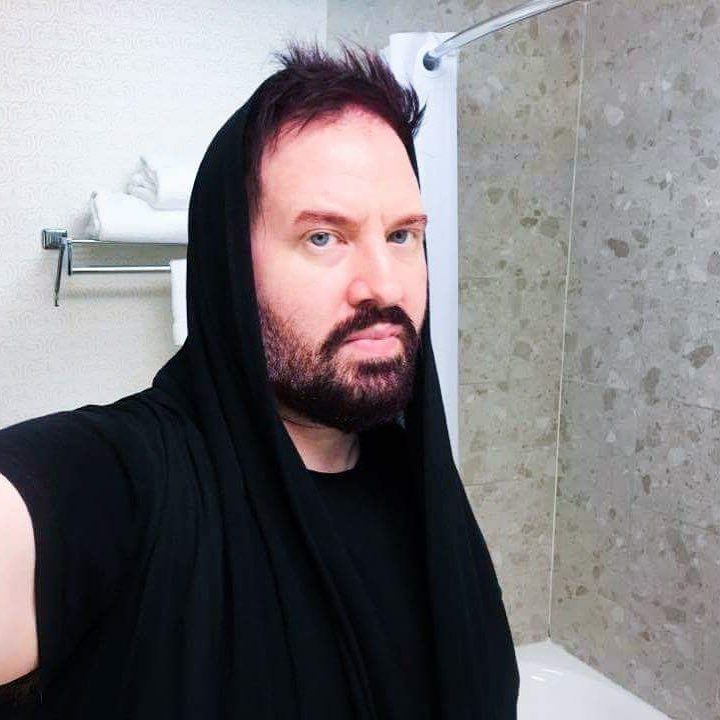
- DJ Textbeak

Background information
- Also known as: The Cobbler
- Born: Michael Szewczyk
- Origin: Elyria, Ohio
- Occupations: Disc jockey, record producer
- Years active: 1991–present
- Label: Cleopatra Records
- Website: textbeak.com

Michael Szewczyk (born 1973), known as DJ Textbeak, is an American DJ, artist and record producer.

DJ Textbeak is known internationally for his varied style of dark and experimental music including remixes for ∆AIMON, Cyanotic, 3Teeth, Architect, among others. In 2016, he was a support act for Modern English.

He is considered influential in the Witch house genre for his early introduction of the movement and exclusive contributions of remixes. He was a contributor to the Zombie Nation song "The Mind of Many."

== Early life ==
Textbeak grew up raised by his single mother and grandparents who helped explore his interest in sounds from classical composition to film documentaries and environmental noise. In his early teens, he was able to orchestrate these sounds through modular distortion and sampling.

Forming his sound, Textbeak was musically grouped with and appealed to punk, dark electro, and techno genres. In 1991 he moved to Columbus, Ohio to start the rave group Body Release with Todd Sines, Titonton Duvante (Residual Records) and Charles Noel (Archetype), to tour the United States.

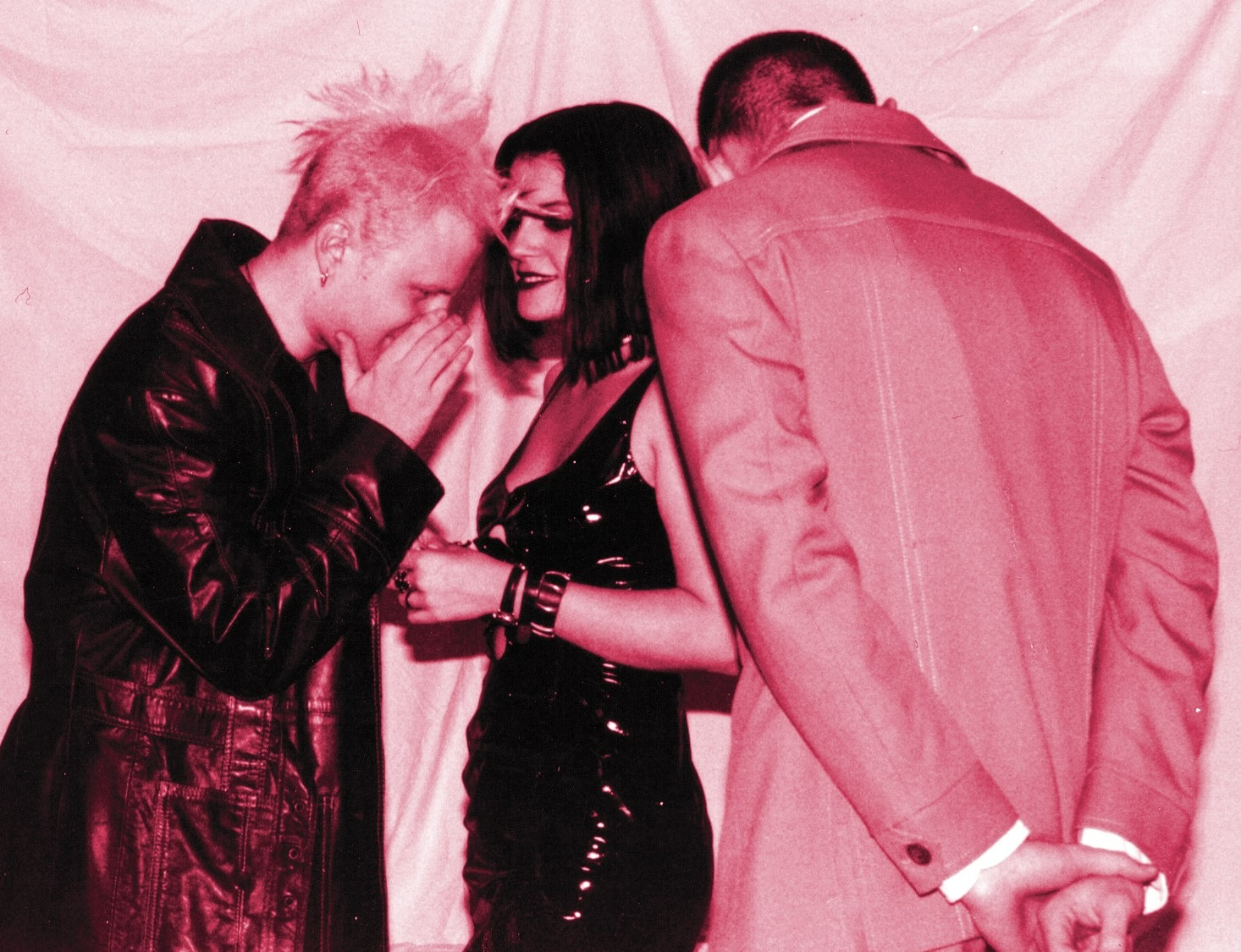
Bath: (L to R) Textbeak aka The Cobbler, Christie Bailey, Lucas Kuzma

By 1993 Textbeak was known as The Cobbler and signed and released original material through Jevan Records, a goth and industrial label, in what he classified as musically "alien, cerebral, and scary." The group project entitled Bath was nominated for music awards.

== Career ==
In 1998, he began releasing solo material and performing internationally alongside acts Merzbow, Tamara Sky, Larry Tee, Nitzer Ebb, and Meat Beat Manifesto to name a few.

In 2011, Textbeak started his own 2-hour satellite program entitled TXTBK's CHVяCH XV BяXK3N 7ANGvAG3 featuring original and remixed tracks of new witch, experimental, industrial, and electro. In the same year, he was invited to participate in an exhibit entitled Necessary Discomforts, a tribute to Rozz Williams at the Hyaena Gallery. In creating artwork, Textbeak's approach is similar to his filter of music, applying collage samples of visual information into a base of painting and illustration. Textbeak also has produced a large body of digital work.

In 2016, Auxiliary Magazine nominated Textbeak best DJ of the year.

== Personal life ==
In 2022, Textbeak married artist Noelle Solringen in Detroit.

== Discography ==
=== As Bath ===
Year	Title	Label
1996	Fools	Jevan Records
1998	N-Graver	Jevan Records
1998	N-Graver Part Two	Jevan Records
2016	Endpoint Fireworshiper	X.O. Skeleton Musick

=== Solo albums ===
Year	Title	Label
2007	Various Levels of Decay	Vaatican Records
2008	False Shit	Amduscias Records
2008	Word Vessels	Bleak Netlabel
2008	Lovecraft	Timetheory
2009	Pis*Freak	Vaatican Records
2009	I could be Wrong	Colin Joncho Records
2012	Textbeak -N- Tndrond - The Spirit of Opposition	I had An Accident Records
2014	Textbeak and Tndrond - Ghost Ornithology	Dark Daze Music/Moon Sounds Records
2015	Textbeak, Decohere & Voctave - Tndrond Live 2003	X.O. Skeleton Musick
2018	Sick For Songs A Season Eats	Cleopatra Records
2021	Sick For Songs A Season Eats Remixes	Cleopatra Records

=== Singles & EPs ===
Year	Title	Label
2006	Thrush	Philtre
2008	Watching Birds Fall	Vaatican Records
2008	Free Tacos and Cat Piss	Swishcotehque
2008	Operation Anvil Remixes	Timetheory
2008	Solo Patterns with Eric Walker	Lasergun
2008	Repeat Repeat Delete	Politicide
2008	The Malaisian	Audiotie
2008	Birdhouse	Xynthetic Netlabel
2008	Four and Twenty Black Birds	Colin Johnco Records
2008	Indiglo (EP)	Tundra
2009	Biolmpactive Rhythm	Audiotie
2010	Glorious and Sinister	Swishcotheque
2012	Amplifii DX	CANS - Label/Collective
2013	EICV7 No.56	EverythingisChemical
2013	Gatchaman	Post Religion
2015	Like Ghosts	Sequel Sound
2025	Neon Bitch	
2025	Orlando (Featuring Brood Faye)	Detroit Industrial
2025	Entropy Lock (Featuring Antoni Maiovvi)	Detroit Industrial
2025	Shoulder Angles and Float Lights (featuring Broken Nails)	Detroit Industrial
2025	Running Toward the Abyss (featuring Other)	Detroit Industrial

=== DJ Mixes ===
Year	Title	Label
2011	Covenfvck	Black Lodge Music
2011	IKONIK A Mix 4	МИШКА
2012	Precarious	2012
2014	Swsmix002	Swishcotheque
2014	CXB7 #165 Outro	TXTBK's CHVяCH XV BяXK3N 7ANGvAG3

=== Soundtracks ===
Year	Title	Reference
2025	Poor Poor Eldon	A film by Lorin Morgan-Richards, score by Textbeak and Joshua Kovarik
2026	The Decline and Fall of Holly Dew and Walter Melon	A film by Lorin Morgan-Richards, score by Textbeak and Joshua Kovarik
