= NamNamBulu =

German synthpop/futurepop band

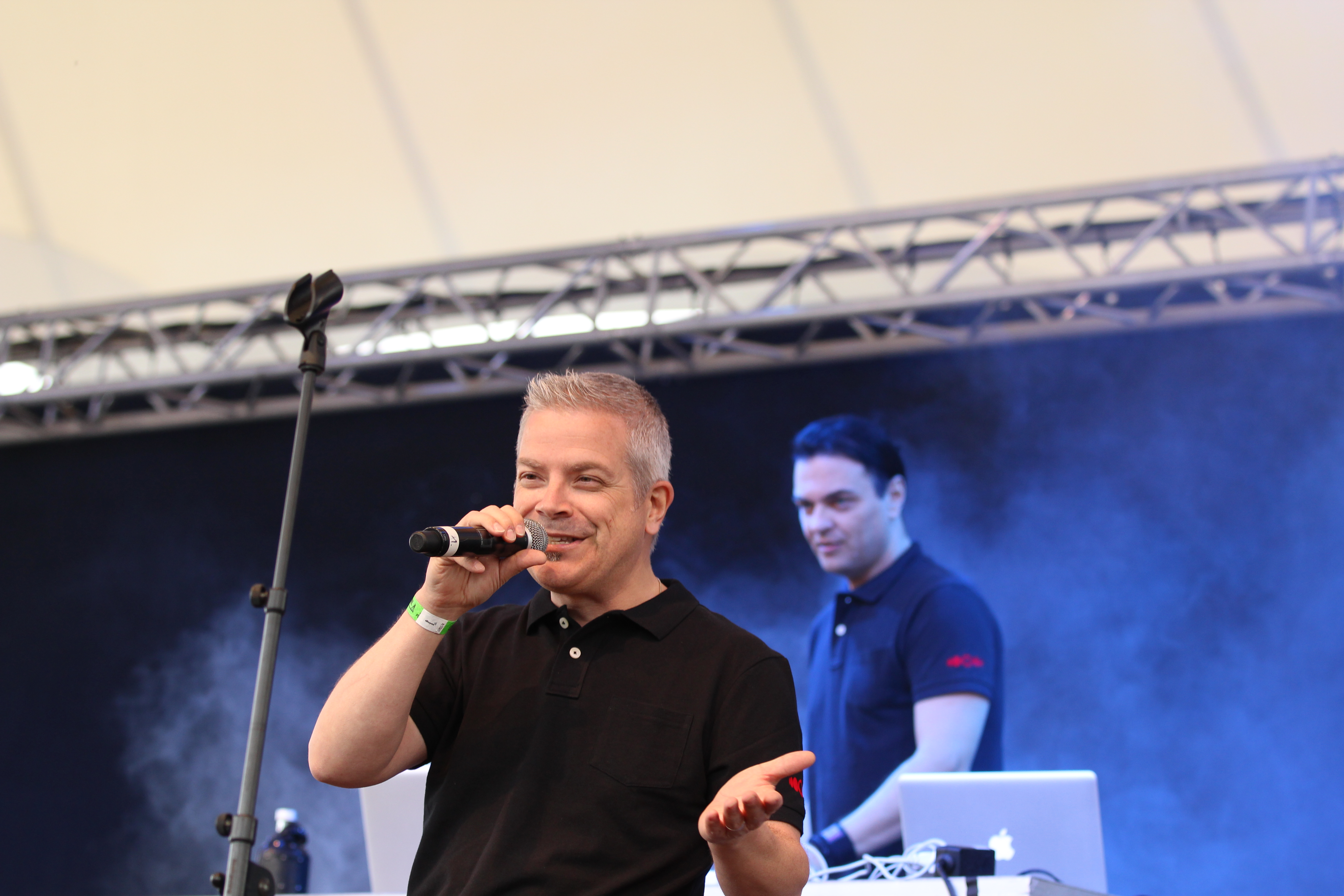
- NamNamBulu at the 2014 Blackfield Festival in Gelsenkirchen, Germany

Background information
- Genres: Synthpop, Futurepop
- Years active: 1988–2005; 2013–present
- Members: Henrik Iversen; Vasi Vallis
- Website: www.namnambulu.com

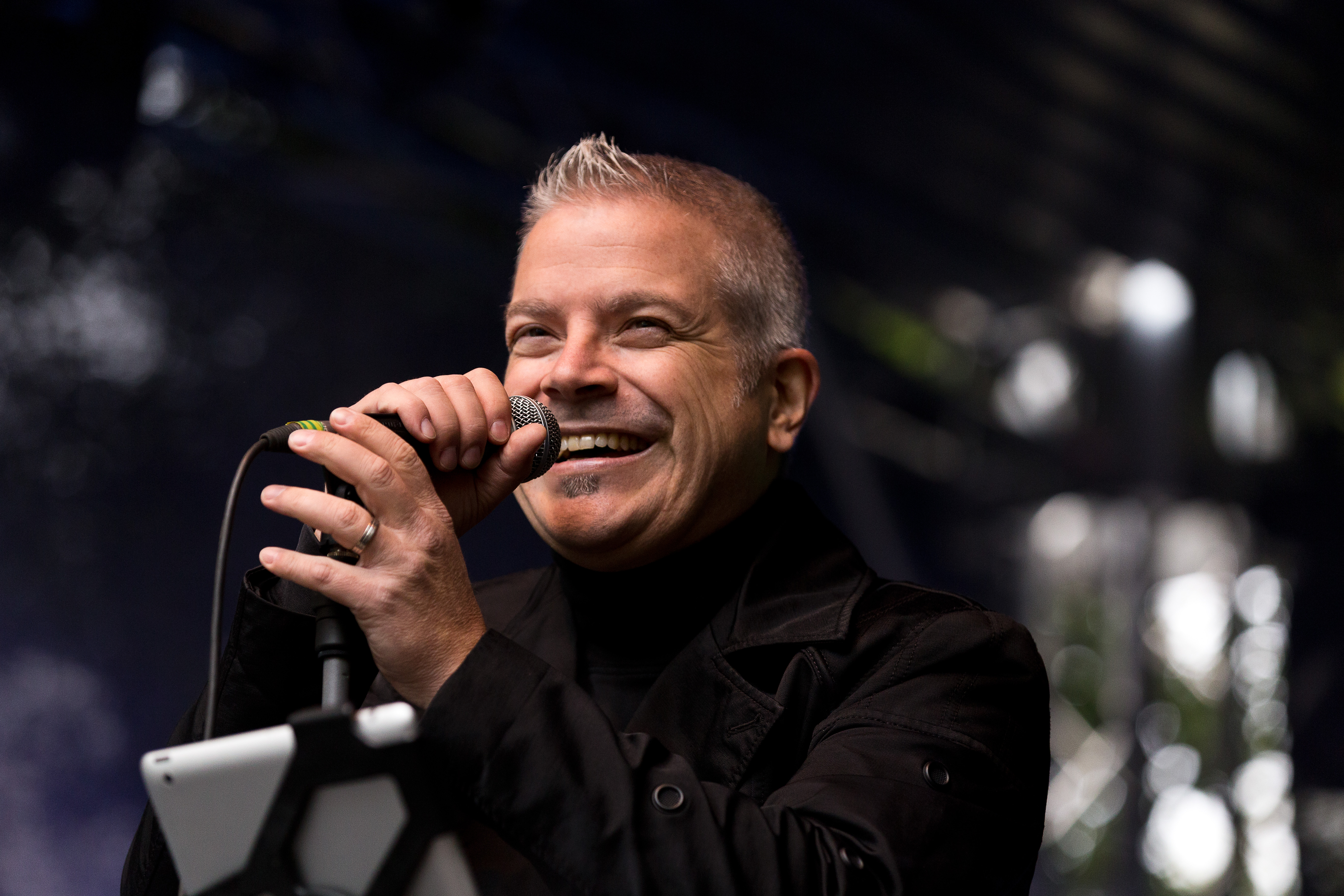
Henrik Iversen at the Nocturnal Culture Night festival 2015.

NamNamBulu is a German synthpop/futurepop band, consisting of Henrik Iversen (lyrics and vocals) and Vasi Vallis (songwriting and arrangement). Their 2005 release Alone reached #53 on the Deutsche Alternative Charts. The band split up in June 2005. NamNamBulu reunited in 2013 for 10-year anniversary tour, including dates at Wave-Gotik-Treffen (after 2004).

== Location ==
The band is located in Switzerland and Germany. Vallis, born in Greece, is responsible for all aspects of composing and arranging the songs and producing remixes, and also does NamNamBulu's remixes for other bands. Henrik Iversen (Norwegian/Danish) is the band's singer and lyricist. He is also the main performer on stage.

== Name history ==
"The name goes back to about 1988, where in college Stefan and Henrik came up with the plan to make some music. So we did... with an Atari ST and a DX21 and DX7. Of course only one of the two could hack on the machine, so the other would have to do something else - in our case that was reading magazines. Stefan at the time was much into history, reading about the Vietnam war... he regularly bought a mag called "NAM" which was about this war. As we would alternate in reading and working, this became the first part of the name: NamNam.

The 'Bulu' has a totally different background. As we would use to go for a beer every now and then, we picked the BULU from an engraving that you could find on Swiss beer glasses from 'Cardinal' beer, just saying 3dl / BULU. What BULU means exactly, we have no clue, but we added it to the band name. There you go: NamNamBulu.

Well.... NNB never got far back then. Stefan made some instrumental pieces, that I might still find on a MD (Minidisk) somewhere. But it wasn't until I met Vasi, that we picked up the name again - even though it might sound a bit funny still :).

By picking a band name away from the commonly used terminology, NNB is trying to avoid being stuck in a cliché, which would prevent the band from evolving in any musical direction that it might find applicable."

== Collaboration with Héctor Alejandro Marín ==
On August 9, 2024, NamNamBulu released the single "Lost Generation", a collaboration with Mexican producer and artist Héctor Alejandro Marín. This release holds special significance as it was Marín's final work before his untimely passing later that month. The collaboration brought together NamNamBulu's characteristic synthpop sound with Marín's unique production style, marking a memorable addition to the band’s discography.

"Lost Generation" received praise for its introspective lyrics and powerful melody, resonating with fans across digital platforms. This single remains a tribute to Marín's impact on the electronic music scene and his enduring legacy.

== Discography ==
- Blind?, July 27, 2002 (EP CD)
- Memories, June 10, 2003 (Mini CD)
- Distances, July 14, 2003 (CD)
- Sacrifice (with Lights of Euphoria), September 30, 2003 (7" vinyl)
- Expansion, May 10, 2004 (EP CD)
- Alone, January 31, 2005 (Mini CD)
- Blinded!, April 25, 2005 (EP CD)
- Distances (Black edition)!, 2010 (CD Remastered Re-Release)
- Sorry 2014 (EP)
- Borders 2017 (CD)
- Distances 2022 (CD)
