= Disown (band) =

American industrial rock band

- Origin: Ohio, United States
- Genres: Industrial rock
- Years active: 2000 – Present
- Labels: Dark Media Interactive, Cleopatra Records
- Website: http://www.myspace.com/disown

Disown is a four-piece Industrial rock band originally from Cleveland, Ohio formed in 2000. Their musical style can be best described as a natural blend of guitar riffs, electronic synths similar to Nine Inch Nails and Linkin Park, and emotional lyrics hinting at bands like A Perfect Circle or Tool. Over the years the band has shared the stage with other well-known bands like HIM, Atreyu, Lacuna Coil, Static-X, Orgy, Godhead, Crossbreed, Mushroomhead, Trust Company, KMFDM and The Apex Theory.

Disown was formed in 2000 by its founding members Jason "Jae" Rohrer on vocals and rhythm guitar, Mitch Langford on lead guitar and sequencing, Jesse Rohrer on bass guitar and Gerry Lakarosky on the drums. They released their first LP titled Angels and Atheists in 2002. An article of the Daily Kent Stater written by Mark Bodkin documented the recording process of their first release. That same year the band replaced their drummer Gerry Lakarosky with Scott Kaczmarek.

Disown performed on the Ozzfest 2004 tour from July 10, 2004 to September 4, 2004. During the tour they performed in front of more than 30,000 people, as opening act on the Second stage. In 2006 Disown began their east coast tour of 13 states and 39 cities, alongside new bassist, Krystle Carter and new guitarist Mikal. Soon after the tour, Jae Rohrer began working on Disown's 3rd full-length album entitled "Grave New World". However, on March 4, 2008 their new guitarist Mikal was involved in a fatal car accident in Michigan, and died two days later on March 6, 2008. Mikal's funeral was held on March 11. The band members refused to comment on the situation. Since then, the band has fallen under the radar of the mainstream media.

During their heyday the band opened for several national acts. They were named in the Top 20 best artist on Myspace in 2008. Disown received sponsorship by Sam Ash Music and endorsements from Halo Guitars. The band was also nominated for Best Goth/Industrial Act three years in a row by the Cleveland Free Times.

== Members ==
- Jason "Jae" Rohrer — vocals, guitar
- Dave Moore — guitar
- Krystle Carter — bass
- Scott Kaczmarek — drums

Past Members

- Mikal — guitars
- Mitch Langford — guitars
- Jesse Rohrer — bass
- Gerry Lakarosky — drums
- Chuck Eddy — guitars
- Mark Keith — bass

== Releases ==
=== Angels and Atheists (2002) ===
1. Guilt Trip
2. Dead Inside
3. Judas
4. No Conclusion
5. If I Were God
6. A Perfect World
7. Beautifully Sickening
8. Stab
9. All That Remains
10. Still Here
11. I Disappear

=== Requiem of One (2004) ===
1. Unto You
2. Mary Lies Bleeding
3. The Dust of Sin
4. Policy of Truth (Depeche Mode cover)
5. Medicinal
6. Undeniably So
7. Far Away from Here
8. What Have I Become?
9. INRI
10. The Eleventh Hour
11. Requiem of One
12. Epitaph
