= DMK (band) =

Colombian Depeche Mode tribute band (2010–2022)

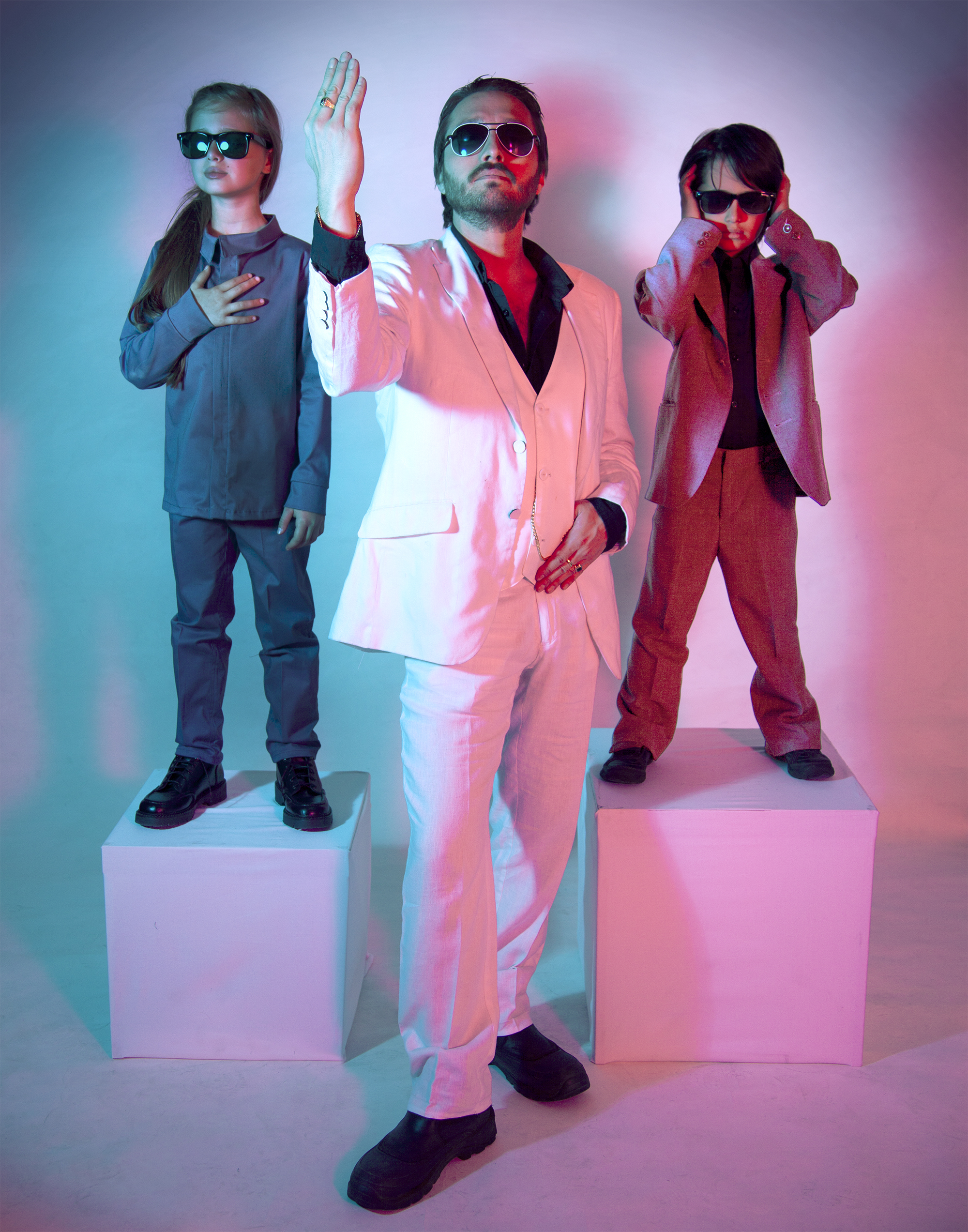
- DMK band photo, 2012. Milah Schrader (left), Malka Mikkelsen (center), Korben Schrader (right).

Background information
- Origin: Bogotá, Colombia
- Genre: Synthpop
- Years active: 2010–2022
- Members: Malka Mikkelsen; Milah Schrader; Korben Schrader
- Website: dmkband.com

DMK are a Depeche Mode tribute band formed in 2010 in Bogotá, Colombia, featuring Malka Mikkelsen (lead vocals, keyboard, xylophone, ukulele, percussion), their daughter Milah Schrader (background vocals, recorder, melodica, ukulele, percussion) and their son Korben Schrader (background vocals, toy keyboard, xylophone, toy accordion, percussion). DMK is noted for crudely emulating the sounds of Depeche Mode using an old keyboard and various toys and household items as instruments. The band became an internet sensation in January 2012, following the release of their third cover video, "Everything Counts". Since their viral success, DMK have been invited to perform in front of live audiences in Colombia, the United States, Spain, Poland and Germany. DMK have been nominated for "Favorite Web Personality" at the 2015 Nickelodeon Kids' Choice Awards Colombia, featured in MTV Iggy's "10 Colombian bands on the rise" article, and in Ultimate Guitar´s list of 10 weirdest cover bands. Their remake of "Everything Counts" has been noted by The Atlantic as one of the most transformative cover songs and by Electronic Beats as one of the ten best Depeche Mode covers ever made. DMK are featured in the film Spirits in the Forest, directed by Anton Corbijn, as one of the six selected stories from fans across the world who attended the last show of the Global Spirit Tour at the Waldbühne in Berlin on July 25, 2018.

== History ==
=== Formation (2010–2012) ===
Malka Mikkelsen had been a Depeche Mode fan since they first heard them in 1987, as they were studying high school in Bogotá. In late 2010, as they were going through the separation from their first wife and the mother of Milah and Korben, Mikkelsen decided to recreate their 1985 classic "Shake the Disease" as an act of psychomagic because they felt a connection with its lyrics at that point in their life. To create their cover version of the song, Mikkelsen used an old Yamaha PSR-150 keyboard that was given to them by their mother, a xylophone a kazoo and several bottles, cans, tambourines, and toys. They invited Milah (then 7) and Korben (then 4) to perform some of the sounds present in the song. In the video they recorded at home and uploaded to YouTube, the screen is split in four sections and Mikkelsen appears to play all instruments simultaneously with both hands and feet. Actually, the screen sections were recorded separately. The video was seen by family and friends, and as the three of them enjoyed the experience, they decided to create a second Depeche Mode cover in the same style as the first, "Strangelove" in mid-2011, in which the participation of both kids became more musically challenging. Since the children could not read sheet music, Mikkelsen devised a color-coded system to label the instruments and write down the notes for the kids to learn.

=== "Everything Counts" (2012) ===
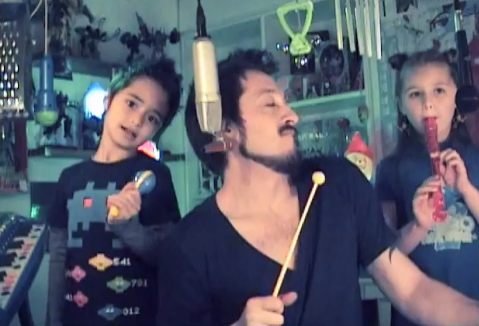
DMK performing "Everything Counts" on their viral YouTube video from 2012

On December 23, 2011, the trio uploaded a third Depeche Mode cover, this time for the song "Everything Counts", expecting it to be seen by the small group of family and friends who enjoyed the previous two. But in late January, 2012, the video was suddenly picked up by news outlets and blogs around the world, like CBS, HuffPost, Wired magazine and The Guardian, quickly becoming viral, making the trio an internet sensation almost overnight.

In February 2012, the band adopted the name DMK, which stands for "Depeche Mode Kids" but also refers to the initials of the band members' names at the time (Dicken, Milah, and Korben).

=== Artistic growth (2012–2018) ===
After the release of "Everything Counts" the band released two more Depeche Mode covers in the same four-screen format: "Black Celebration", released in June, 2012, and "Enjoy the Silence", released in December, 2012. Then, in May, 2013, they released "Just Can't Get Enough", as a live version especially recorded in the streets of La Candelaria, Bogotá, for the BAS 2013 festival in Basildon, UK.

Since their online popularity exploded, they have been invited to perform in front of live audiences, first in local events like the Festival Tecnológico Texun 2012 in Medellín and the Fantástico! Festival Internacional de las Artes 2013 in Barranquilla, and then festivals outside Colombia, like the Échale Latino Music Estyles festival in San Antonio, Texas, on May 9, 2014, and the ¡Pachanga! Latino Music Festival in Austin, Texas, on May 10, 2014. They also headlined Sónar Kids in El Port de la Selva, Catalonia, on May 24 and 25, 2014, where they performed in front of a crowd of over 5000 people.

In December 2014, DMK released their seventh cover video, "But Not Tonight", their first professionally made music video, recorded in a studio in Bogotá and inspired in Depeche Mode imagery and Antoine de Saint-Exupéry's novella The Little Prince.

On March 13, 2015, DMK opened the second day of Festival Estéreo Picnic in their hometown of Bogotá. The show was a success despite the fact that Korben broke his right elbow two days before the festival and had to play only with his left hand.

In May 2015, after 5 years of recording Depeche Mode covers, DMK released their first original composition entitled "Pale Blue Dot", a homage to the famous photograph taken by the Voyager 1 space probe and, incidentally, to Carl Sagan's thoughts about it expressed on his book by the same name. They also announced that the kids would move with their mother to Miami, Florida, but that this separation would not break up the band.

In 2016, DMK performed at the Tauron Nowa Muzzyka festival in Katowice, Poland.

On March 20, 2017, they were chosen to take over Depeche Mode's Facebook page as part of the Takeover campaign, becoming one of Martin Gore's favorite entries, who publicly expressed it in a video posted on Depeche Mode's Facebook page.

DMK released on YouTube their first 360° video, recorded in their Bogotá home, for the 1982 classic "The Meaning of Love" in October 2017, followed by a similarly recorded video for Personal Jesus on early 2018.

On March 16, 2018, two of the band members, Dicken and Korben, were finally able to meet Depeche Mode at a meet-and-greet in Bogotá during their Global Spirit Tour.

=== Spirits in the Forest (2019–2020) ===
On November 21, 2019, Spirits in the Forest was released in theaters worldwide, featuring the stories of six life-long Depeche Mode fans, including Dicken Schrader and DMK. Sources vary on the total gross of the movie's one-night release, with one claiming about US$2.5m while another claims US$4.5m. It reached Number 3 on the box office charts in Mexico and Number 2 in both Germany and the UK.

=== Permanent hiatus and compilation album (2021–2022) ===
On February 26, 2022, DMK released their last video, "Enjoy the Silence '22" and announced their decision of going into "permanent hiatus" through an online Zoom event hosted by the Depeche Mode Global Fan Club, and on December of the same year they released their only album, Songs of Tiny Devotion: A Family Tribute to Depeche Mode 2010–2022, compiling all of the covers they created during the past 12 years plus an original song. The album was released on all major music streaming services including Spotify, Apple Music, iTunes, Amazon Music, and Pandora.

== Discography ==
- Songs of Tiny Devotion: A Family Tribute to Depeche Mode 2010–2022 (2022)

== Videography ==
- Shake the Disease – DMK (2010)
- Strangelove – DMK (2011)
- Everything Counts – DMK (2011)
- Black Celebration – DMK (2012)
- Enjoy the Silence – DMK (2012)
- Just Can't Get Enough – DMK (2013)
- But Not Tonight – DMK (2014)
- Pale Blue Dot – DMK (2015)
- Live in Poland – DMK (2016)
- The Meaning of Love – DMK (2017)
- Personal Jesus – DMK (2018)
- Live in NYC – DMK (2019)
- Precious – DMK (2020)
- Enjoy the Silence '22 – DMK (2022)
