= Click Click =

British electro-industrial music band

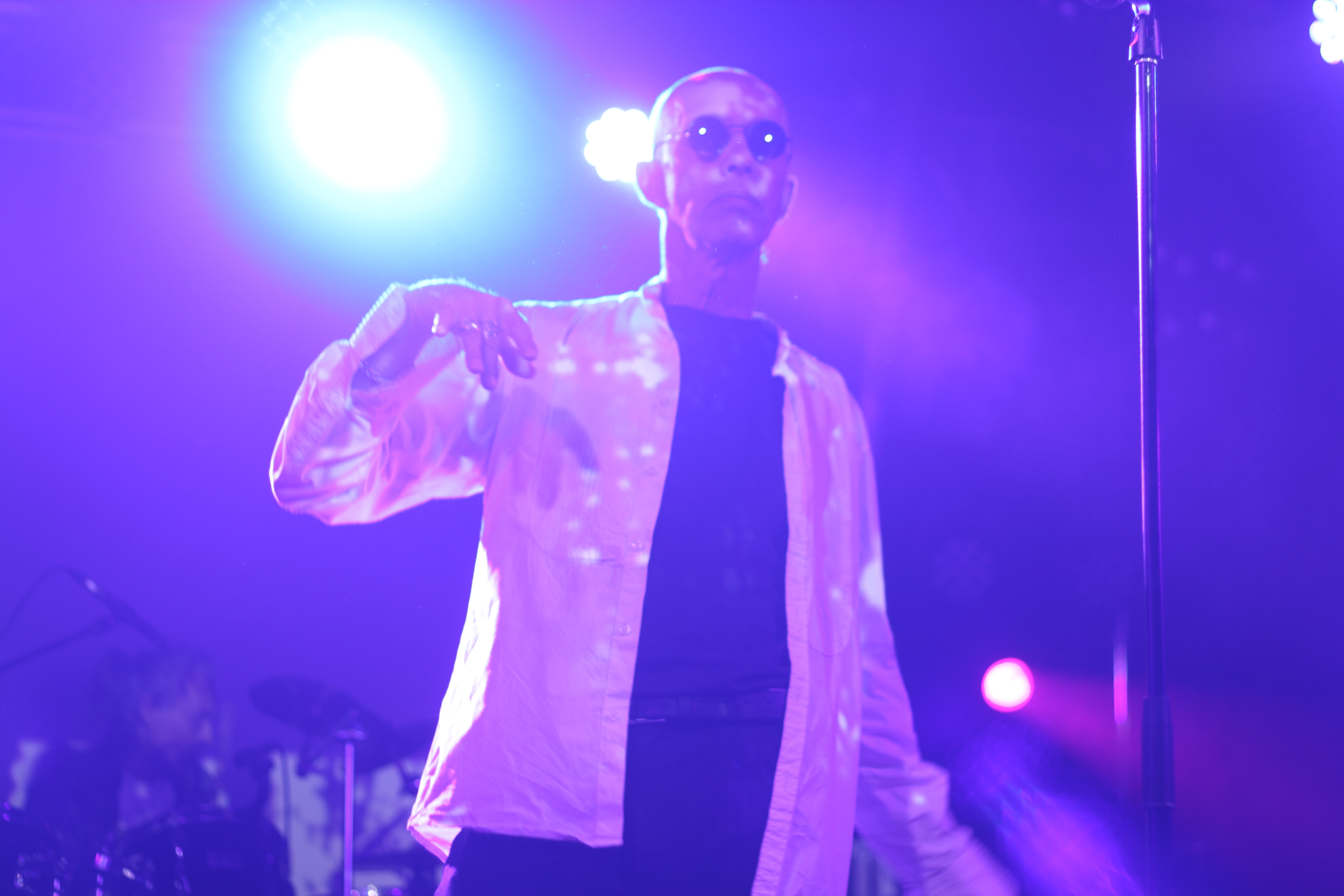
- Click Click in August 2013

Background information
- Origin: United Kingdom
- Genres: electro-industrial; EBM; Post-punk
- Years active: 1982–1990, 1997–1998, 2004–present
- Labels: Lung Function; Play It Again Sam; Off Beat; Rotorbabe Recordings; Dependent; 4mg
- Spinoffs: Paperhouse; Skripglow; The Toy Shop
- Spinoff of: Those Nervous Surgeons
- Members: Adrian Smith; Derek E. Smith
- Past members: Richard Camp; Jon Morris; Pete Hosier; Graham Stronach
- Website: www.facebook.com/ClickClick.UK

Click Click is a British electro-industrial band.

Click Click formed in 1982 by Adrian Smith, and Derek E. Smith, after the end of their previous rock project Those Nervous Surgeons (which formed in 1976 with bassist Tim Wilson). The direction of the group changed dramatically when Wilson bought their first synthesizer, an EDP Wasp.

In 1982, the group acquired guitarist Richard Camp from Bikini Amber and thus the first experimental synth-rock incarnation of the band was born. After weeks of rehearsal the band landed a gig at a festival but still had not settled on a new name. Adrian found inspiration for a name in an antique electric light switch in a cottage in Cornwall that "made a resounding Click Click" when operated. They cut their first single later that year, but Camp departed over creative issues and formed a blues band.

Influenced by artists such as Brian Eno, Cabaret Voltaire, The Residents and Frank Zappa, and of course Blade Runner, Clive Barker and "mind-expanding" substances, Click Click continued on with other revolving members down a more electronic path. In 1985, the band had a recording session with engineer Alan Fisch (who was also working with Hula and Cabaret Voltaire) and producer Stuart Skinner at Vibrasound studio in Sheffield. This session yielded the track "Sweet Stuff" which was considered a breakthrough in the band's sound, achieving "single of the week" in Sounds magazine and ending up on the Play It Again Sam compilation, This is Electronic Body Music. Thereafter, the band had numerous releases on Play It Again Sam and a tour in 1988 in support of the Rorschach Testing album. Until their eventual break up around 1990, other members included guitarist Jon Morris, who was replaced by Graham Stronach in 1987 and Pete Hosier who remained with the group until the end.

After a seven-year hiatus, Adrian and Derek Smith reformed briefly in 1997 to record Shadowblack on the Off Beat label. The album was more EBM than their earlier work and almost completely instrumental. It was greeted with overall positive reviews within the underground music scene. Due to the member's volatile relationship however, the band split again in 1998, with no plans for another reunion.

A Click Click vinyl release was issued on NYC-based Sonic Groove Records in 2004, but it is most like that only Adrian was involved, but that is still unclear. Throughout the 2000s, Adrian has been involved with Paperhouse, a darker ambient soundtrack project. Nothing has been released publicly, aside from a few odd compilation appearances, but at least 4 CD-R releases are known to exist: Bug Sun, Sappho, Frey, and Sammlung. In addition, three Click Click CD-Rs surfaced offering odd unreleased and remixed material: Lung Function, Crushed, and Behind Dark Glasses.

The summer of 2008 brought the news that Click Click's back catalogue would be available again, this time via various download platforms including iTunes. The material will come in remastered versions and will also include the early catalogue. Lung Function, a compilation of remastered singles, was released on iTunes, Amazon digital service and eMusic in 2008.

== Singles ==
- "Run Me Down" 7" (1982)
- "Sweet Stuff" (Rorschach Testing) 12" (1985)
- "Skripglow" (Rorschach Testing) (1986)
- "I Rage I Melt" (Planet) MCD, 12" (1987)
- "Double Bill" (Play it Again Sam) MCD, 12" (1988)
- "Yakutska" (Play it Again Sam) MCD, 12" (1988)
- "Whiteout" (OffBeat) CD (1998)
- "Relax / Pleasure & Pain / Without Sound" (Sonic Groove) (12" EP) (2004)
- "Mekanakill" (Rotobabe) (Digital Single) (2015)

== Albums ==
- Party Hate (Rorschach Testing) (1986)
- Wet Skin & Curious Eye (Rorschach Testing) (1987)
- Rorschach Testing (PIAS) (1988)
- Bent Massive (PIAS) (1989)
- Shadowblack (OffBeat) (1997)
- Party Hate Revisited (Dependent) (2007)
- Lung Function (Dependent) (2008)
- Skin & Bones (Dependent) (2011)
- Ausgraben (Rotorbabe) (2014)
- Those Nervous Surgeons (Dependent) (2014)
- Live At Lung Function (1988) (Rotorbabe) (2014)
- Rorschach Resurrected (Rotorbabe) (2015)
- ShadowBlackOps (Rotorbabe) (2015)
