= Nilaihah Records =

American independent record label

Nilaihah Records is an American independent record label based in Columbus, Ohio. It was founded in 1999 by Kristy Venrick of The Azoic, after Oneiroid Psychosis asked her to release their next album.

Since then, the label has signed acts spanning a variety of electronic music styles, such as Unheilig, The Azoic, and Frozen Plasma. The label formed a partnership with the German label Infacted, serving as the North American outlet for European bands like Ad Inferna, XP8, NamNamBulu, Conetik, Endanger, and Liquid Divine, signing them to distribution deals. The label had a joint venture with Infacted on Muscle and Hate, a tribute to Nitzer Ebb featuring members of XP8 and Icon of Coil.

== Meaning ==
Nilaihah (pronounced "nil-EYE-ah") is an old English word meaning "poetics of the fallen", and is named after the opening track of The Azoic's 1998 album Where Broken Angels Lie.

== Current artists ==
- 00tz 00tz (Alter Eden)
- Alkemic Generator (When We Fail/Scream EP, The Wishful Illusion EP, Orinic Geometry)
- The Azoic (Where Broken Angels Lie, Forward, Conflict, Illuminate, Re:Illumination, Corruption)
- Bow Ever Down (The Product of My Pain)
- Distorted Reality (The Fine Line Between Love and Hate & Daydreams and Nightmares)
- END: the DJ (Fires on the Shore)
- GASR (Survival of the Fittest, Reptile)
- Interface (Beyond Humanity, Destination Focus, Transit EP, Visions of Modern Life, Body Flow EP)
- Invisible Ballet (Escaping Light)
- Lestat (Arisen)
- Null Device (Sublimation, A Million Different Moments & Excursions, Suspending Belief)
- Sensuous Enemy (Sirens of the Sea, Voyager)
- Silent Auction (H on Earth)
- Sonik Foundry (Parish of Redemption, Explosive)
- Xiescive (Nexus)
- XMH (State of Mind)
- Zoica (A to Z)

== Previous artists ==
- Ad Inferna (DSM, There Is No Cure)
- Backlash (Impetus)
- Blind Faith and Envy (The Charming Factor)
- Conetik (Carbon Elektriq v2.0)
- Dissonance (Reincarnate)
- Endanger (Addicted to the Masses)
- Fiction 8 (Chaotica & Forever, Neverafter)
- Frozen Plasma (Artificial)
- Level 2.0 (Armageddon, Battle Sight Zero, Elevate)
- Liquid Divine (Interface)
- Muscle and Hate (A Tribute to Nitzer Ebb)
- NamNamBulu (Distances & Expansion)
- Oneiroid Psychosis (Garden of Remembrance)
- Unheilig (Puppenspiel)
- XP8 (Hrs:Min:Sec)
