= Null Device =

US electronic pop band

- Origin: Wisconsin, USA
- Genres: Electronic, Synthpop
- Years active: 1995–present
- Labels: Nilaihah, Distortion
- Members: Eric Oehler; Eric Goedken; Jill Sheridan; Kendra Kreutz
- Past members: Elizabeth Scheef; Dan Clark; Charles "Chuck4" McKenzie; Tom Lawrence; William Annis
- Website: http://www.nulldevice.com

Null Device is an electronic band from Wisconsin, USA.

== Band History ==
Founded in 1995 by students at the University of Wisconsin, Null Device initially focused on instrumental electronic music before transitioning to more traditional synthpop. After a series of independently-released demos, they were signed to Nilaihah Records in 2002, and released several subsequent albums via that label. In that time they incorporated influences of Arabic and Indian traditional instrumentation.

After the dissolution of the label, they went on to release two more records independently, before signing to Distortion Productions.

== Members ==
=== Current ===
- Eric Oehler - Vocals, Violin, Synthesizer, Percussion, Bass, Songwriting
- Eric Goedken - Lyrics, Production
- Jill Sheridan - Keyboards, Songwriting, Vocals, Production
- Kendra Kreutz - Cello

=== Former ===
- Elizabeth Scheef - Dumbek, Frame drum
- Dan Clark - Guitar
- Charles "Chuck4" McKenzie - Bass
- Tom Lawrence - Synthesizer
- William Annis - Synthesizer

== Discography ==
=== Albums ===
- 1999 - The Year in Pixels
- 2002 - Sublimation
- 2004 - A Million Different Moments
- 2007 - Excursions
- 2010 - Suspending Belief
- 2013 - While You Were Otherwise Engaged
- 2016 - Perihelion
- 2019 - Line Of Sight
- 2022 - The Emerald Age

=== EPs and Singles ===
- 2000 - Crimson
- 2000 - Submariner/Love Stain (Split EP with Polymorphous Perverse)
- 2001 - Subliminal
- 2003 - Footfalls (EP)
- 2005 - The London (EP)
- 2009 - Recursions
- 2010 - Fading Belief w/ The Dark Clan
- 2011 - Something More Exciting Than A Tornado (Live)
- 2011 - Misadventures in Dub 1
- 2011 - Monkey Gone to Heaven
- 2012 - Meds
- 2012 - Triangular (2012 Version)
- 2014 - Night Owl
- 2014 - Aphelion
- 2015 - Wardrobe
- 2016 - What's On Your Mind
- 2017 - All You Fascists Bound To Lose
- 2018 - Only You
- 2021 - Red Right Hand
- 2021 - Run/Let You In
- 2022 - Flags
- 2023 - True Faith
