= Construction Time Again =

1983 studio album by Depeche Mode

Studio album by Depeche Mode
- Released: 22 August 1983
- Recorded: Mid-1983
- Studios: The Garden (London); Hansa Studios (West Berlin)
- Genres: Synth-pop; industrial; new wave
- Length: 42:26
- Label: Mute
- Producers: Depeche Mode; Daniel Miller

Depeche Mode chronology
A Broken Frame (1982)	Construction Time Again (1983)	People Are People (1984)

Singles from Construction Time Again
- 1. "Everything Counts" Released: 11 July 1983; 2. "Love, in Itself" Released: 19 September 1983

Construction Time Again is the third studio album by the English electronic band Depeche Mode, released on 22 August 1983 by Mute Records. It was the band's first album to feature Alan Wilder as a member, who wrote two of the album's songs. The album's title comes from a verse of the track "Pipeline". It was recorded at John Foxx's The Garden studios in London, mixed at Hansa Studios in West Berlin, and supported by the Construction Time Again Tour in Europe, which ran from September 1983 through March 1984.

The album, which reached number 6 on the UK Albums Chart, was supported by two singles: "Everything Counts", which reached number 6 on the UK singles chart, and "Love, in Itself", which charted at number 21.

== Background and recording ==
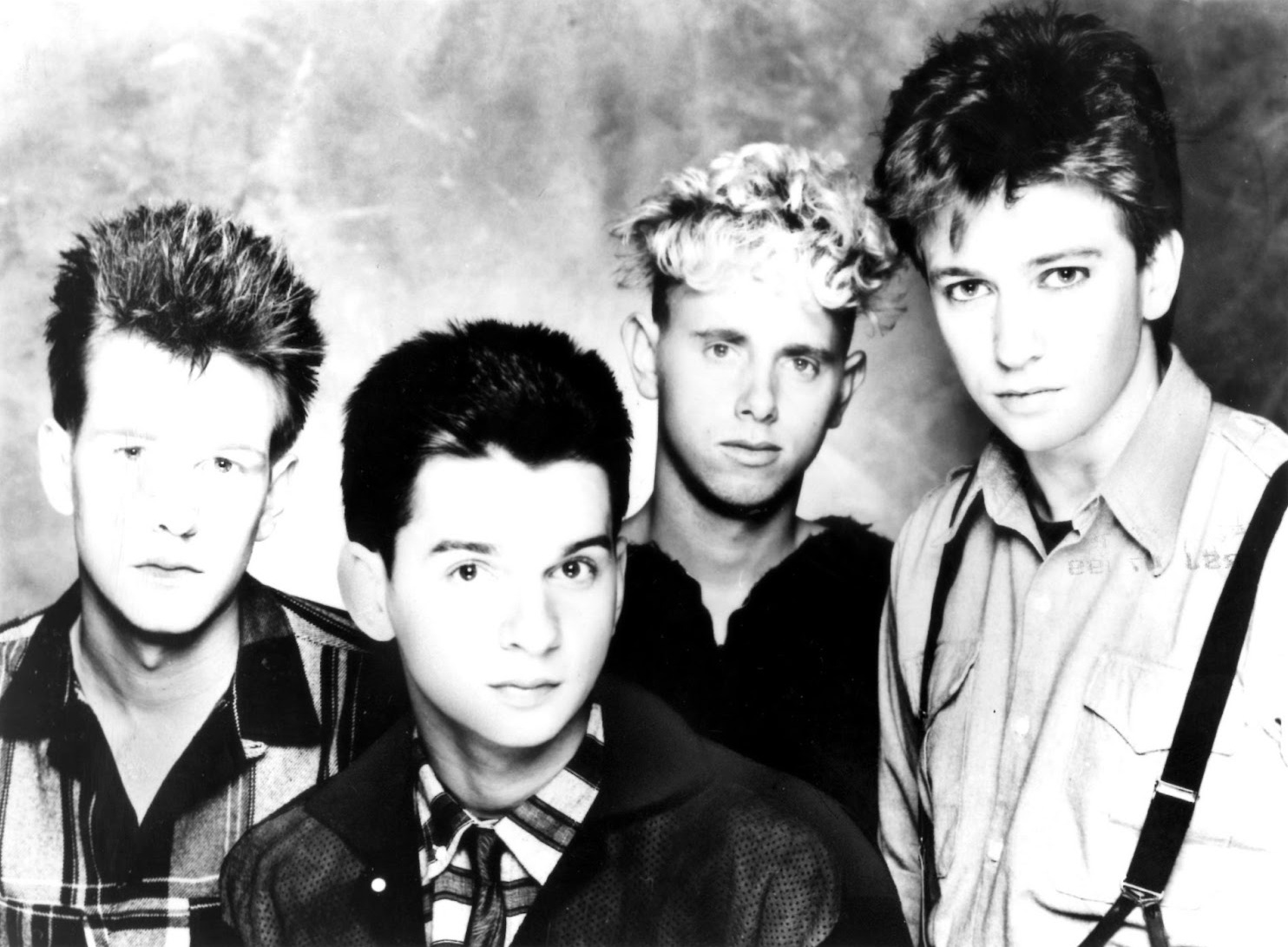
Depeche Mode in 1983; L to R: Andy "Fletch" Fletcher, Dave Gahan, Martin Gore and Alan Wilder; Construction Time Again was the band's first studio album with Wilder

Depeche Mode had released their previous album, A Broken Frame in September 1982 and supported it with their A Broken Frame Tour, which lasted until May 1983. In early 1983, while still on tour, the band started to plan how to approach recording their new material; according to producer Daniel Miller, it was "the first record where you could say we actually sat down before we started and really decided how we were going to utilize the technology that was available at the time." In April, while on the Asian leg of the tour in Thailand, the band were unsettled by the poverty and open child exploitation. New band member Alan Wilder noted that songwriter Martin Gore "wrote pretty much all [the songs of Construction Time Again] in a couple of weeks straight after those trips. They seemed to come together pretty quickly and it was obvious that all these bizarre places such as Bangkok had opened up a few eyes in the band." This was the first Depeche Mode album to include Wilder in the writing and recording process, who had been inducted into the band in late 1982, after their previous album had been recorded and released.

The band, as well as Miller, wanted to change up their recording process for this new album, and collectively they decided to work at a new studio, and so the first time did not record at Blackwing Studios, instead choosing to work at John Foxx's Garden Studios in London. There, they worked with Gareth Jones as their sound technician, who had worked with Foxx on his debut solo studio album Metamatic (1980), as well as with German new wave band Ideal on their album Bi Nuu (1982). Initially, Jones was reluctant to work with Depeche Mode as he felt they were too commercial and viewed them as "pop" and "lightweight," but Foxx persuaded Jones to work with the band as Foxx felt that the band would be worthwhile as Miller was their producer and they were a Mute label artist. In the studio, Gore and Jones bonded over their interest in the German experimental music group Einstürzende Neubauten, who Gore had seen at a show in January that year, giving him the idea to experiment with the sounds of industrial music in the context of pop. Said Jones, "It turned out that we had compatible approaches to the studio. We all wanted to discover new sound worlds, and give a sense of depth, scale and edge to the songs and music." Wilder, as the new member of the band, felt he had to be diplomatic about how he asserted himself in the studio without appearing pushy, but the other members of the group appreciated Wilder's input, presence and classical music training, with Gore saying "I quite liked the fact that he was there. It was almost like having a teacher check your work before it goes out."

For the album, Wilder and Miller had brought both a Synclavier and an E-mu Emulator, which allowed the band to capture and manipulate sounds in a way they hadn't been able to prior. They were inspired to buy an expensive Synclavier after it was used to produce Michael Jackson's album Thriller (1982), which was on its way to becoming the best-selling album in history. The band found it cumbersome to use, but were happy with the results on their previous single, "Get the Balance Right!". This marked the start of the band's move from the analogue synthesisers used on their previous albums to sampling and digital technology, which Foxx credited Jones for helping with. (Note: Depeche Mode's first album produced entirely digitally would be 1987's Music for the Masses.) To get a "tougher" sound out of their music, they often hooked up the synthesiser to amplifiers and recorded the sounds in the studio space instead of directly off the synthesiser itself, which Jones felt was his true contribution to the album, saying "I had a bunch of different amps hooked up in different rooms with mics near and far, so we were able to experiment with distortions and acoustic spaces easily. ... The sense of place was very important for helping to enhance and create moods and atmospheres."

The band also used a portable Stellavox SP 7 tape recorder, which allowed them to record sounds outside the studio for inclusion on the album. Wilder remember that initially, recording the album "was like a pioneering expedition. All of us would go off to derelict areas armed with a hammer and tape recorders." Gore found the approach to be "a revelation": "We were going out, smashing pieces of metal with sledgehammers, raiding the kitchen drawer for utensils to make percussion sounds." With regards to the heavy amount of sampling, the band would sample various 'found' sounds, such as toy instruments or other objects like stones and objects found in construction sites which they would manipulate using the Synclavier. Wilder said, "You can take the purest voice in the world, and fool around with it digitally until it's the most evil, monstrous sound. Or you can take a moose fart and make it beautiful." Miller recalled "Martin [Gore] would turn up with some toy or some other weird instrument and we just started recording it, sampling it, doing shit with it." He looked back on the recording process as one of the most enjoyable he has been through stating "I sit at home with my synthesisers making great noises, but when you can put those experiments into the pop form that's thrilling."

"Pipeline"
A 30-second sample of "Pipeline" demonstrating the use of sampled sounds to construct a melody as well as a demonstration of the more socially conscious lyrics the group sang on this album.

The song "Pipeline" reflected the "found sound" ethos of the album the most; for the vocals, Martin sang on location beside train tracks near Shoreditch. According to Miller, Gore sang the song while standing under an arch of an old building: "You can hear the trains in the background, and all sorts of stuff." The song's final mix didn't include any additional overdubs, the only changes were adjustments to balance levels.

Although they had a reputation as an all-synth band, two tracks from the album incorporated guitar ("Love, in Itself" and "And Then..."), as had their previous single, "Get the Balance Right!", which, despite having been recorded only a few months prior to the Construction sessions, was not included on the album, as the band felt that the song had little in common with the newer material they were recording. Miller described the recording process as "a massive leap forward" from previous albums.

Despite calling themselves a "non-political" band, Gore started to write more socially-conscious lyrics, especially after the trip to Thailand. "Everything Counts" was, according to Gore, "about things getting out of hand. Business getting to the point where individuals don't count, and you'll tread on anybody." Wilder wrote two of the songs on the album, "The Landscape is Changing" and "Two Minute Warning", both of which reflected the band's growing political and social lyrical focus. Wilder felt that, as this was the first Depeche Mode album he worked on, he should take part in songwriting, although he did not consider it his strong suit. Said Wilder, "I felt I should participate in the process. However, it became clear that my strengths were more to do with placement of sounds and the structuring of the music, and I suppose my classical upbringing was a factor in this. What I really added was an enthusiasm and desire to experiment more. I was also desperate for us to be taken more seriously, which meant producing a darker, more weighty sound." At one point, Wilder approached Gore with the idea that they could co-write songs together, an idea that Gore shot down; Wilder said that Gore "wasn't into it at all."

In July 1983, the band moved to Hansa Studios in Berlin to mix the album. Lead vocalist Dave Gahan explained that, as Hansa had the only 56 track mixing desk in the world at the time, (Note: Another source reported the desk was actually a 64-track mixing desk.) "we had used so many channels on the recording that we couldn't possibly have mixed the record at the studio we recorded it [The Garden in London] – they only had a 24 track desk. Plus, we wanted to sample a different atmosphere. If you work in just the one place it can get quite boring." Gore, who had been engaged to his childhood sweetheart Anne Swindell while living in England, broke off the engagement shortly after moving to Berlin. Describing Swindell, Gore said "she had me on the reins. She was ridiculous – anything was perverted! If I watched something on TV, and there was somebody naked, I was a pervert." Enjoying his newfound freedom in Berlin, Gore found a new girlfriend, a German woman named Christina Friederich. Gore, Friederich, and most of the band took to partying in the city's all-night clubs. Jones later said that "Everyone got the Berlin vibe and started wearing black leather, me included!"

After the album was completed and before the tour began, Wilder joined Gahan and his girlfriend Jo Fox on a holiday in the Canary Islands while Gore stayed in Berlin to spend time with Friederich; Fletcher returned to Basildon.

=== Equipment ===
Besides the Synclavier, E-mu Emulator and Stellavox SP7 tape recorder, the band used an E-mu Drumulator, Roland TR-808, and a PPG Wave 2 to record the album.

=== Remixes ===
The growing importance of remixes over the previous few years had led the band to remix their songs for single releases. Said Wilder, the release of the single "Get the Balance Right!" was "the beginning of when everybody realized you had to make a 12-inch mix to help sell your single". Wilder later said

At that time, Mode tracks were always recorded with the LP version in mind. From there, we would either edit down for a 7" version or expand for a 12". To make a 12" involved running off differently mixed sections [of a song] onto two-track tape until we had enough pieces to edit the new version together. The tape editing process was much more limiting and took longer than current digital methods. The mere fact that it was much harder to work to create a totally different and new version of a song probably contributed to the style of those early mixes and accounts for a lot of their charm. [The remixes] were usually thrown together fairly quickly with time running out at the end of [their corresponding album's] mixing session.

=== Album cover, title and socialist themes ===
The album cover was designed by Martin Atkyns and photographed by Brian Griffin, both of whom had worked with Depeche Mode on the earlier album and single covers. The cover, with its "worker-with-sledgehammer design", was a continuation of the concept started by their earlier single, "Get the Balance Right!". Atkins would explain the cover as influenced by socialist realism: "that kind of political look at things was more fashion than specific statement. It was exciting-looking stuff and I think that nobody had really exploited it, had never marketed it in an everyday product like a record." Griffin took the cover image in Zermatt, Switzerland to shoot the model, who was his assistant's brother and an ex-Royal Marine, with the Matterhorn in the background. Griffin said later that he's occasionally asked if the cover is Photoshopped due to its composition.

The album got its name from album track "Pipeline", which contained the lyric "construction time again", which tied into the cover's "work" concept. The titles of A Broken Frame and Construction Time Again were, according to Wilder a few years later, likely a reflection of what was going on within the group at the time, saying that the former was "some kind of comment on Vince leaving" and that the latter reflected how the band was putting itself back together.

Wilder said of the cover and title "the album leans toward socialist ideas, and the Worker [on the cover] illustrates that – he's an obvious, universally understandable symbol of socialism. Looking at this man breaking the mountain, you immediately realize he's not destroying it. Because he's a worker, he's going to rebuild it – his action is constructive. That was the intended message of the album – positive, which is why we called it Construction Time Again, not Destruction Time." Gahan elaborated, saying "Martin [Gore], Andy [Fletcher], and I come from working-class backgrounds, and our lyrics are starting to reflect that."

== Release and promotion ==
Promotional poster for the Construction Time Again Tour

"Everything Counts" was released as the lead single from the album in July 1983, and a month later, Construction Time Again was released on 22 August 1983 by Mute Records in the UK with catalogue number STUMM13. In Germany, Intercord Records released the album (catalogue number INT 146.807) as well as a special edition that came packaged with a poster and the 12″ single for "Get the Balance Right!".

The band worked to evolve their look over the course of the album's release, moving away from "respectable pull-overs and checked shirts" and towards wearing black; Gore started wearing fetish leather harnesses in photoshoots, which became part of the band's image over the next few years.

Upon release, Construction Time Again fared well in the UK, reaching number 6 on the album charts, and in Germany where it reached number 7. Although the German press had been good to the band, they were confused about their relative success in Germany, where the album sold twice as many copies as in the UK. Said Andy Fletcher, "We never saw ourselves as having vaguely Germanic overtones to the music. If you've ever heard German pop music ... I can't see the connection." By contrast, reception in the US was lacklustre, resulting in the planned US leg of their upcoming tour being cancelled.

At the end of 1983, RCA Records released the album track "Told You So" as a promo single on 7″ vinyl under catalogue number ESP-611, and in early 1984, Warner Records in the US released a rare promotional cassette sealed inside a soft drink can that contained the 12″ remix of "Everything Counts" as well as select tracks by other contemporary artists such as the Smiths and the Cure (catalogue number SR-1A).

Only "Love, In Itself" and "Everything Counts" were released as official singles form the album. According to Wilder, the band "toyed with the idea of 'And Then...' and one or two other tracks, but for some reason the third single never materialised."

=== Tour ===
The Construction Time Again Tour, which took place in Europe, began in September 1983 in Hitchin, England. For the first time, the band had a stage concept for the show, which included podiums for the keyboardists and a light show from three lighting towers on stage. Following an initial leg of dates in the United Kingdom and Ireland, a second leg in December reached Sweden, Denmark, Belgium, the Netherlands and West Germany. In March 1984, the group performed its first dates in Italy and Spain. On 2 June 1984, three months after the previous show of the tour, Depeche Mode played a one-off show supporting Elton John in Ludwigshafen, West Germany. The BBC recorded and broadcast the show on 6 October 1983 on BBC Radio 1 and later released a 7-track sampler from that show on promotional vinyl (catalogue number CN 4304/S).

== Critical reception ==
Professional ratings
Review scores
Source	Rating
AllMusic	3/5 stars
The Austin Chronicle	3/5 stars
Number One	5/5
PopMatters	5/10
Q	4/5 stars
Record Mirror	5/5 stars
Rolling Stone	3/5 stars
The Rolling Stone Album Guide	2/5 stars
Smash Hits	7/10
Uncut	2/5 stars

On the album's politically inclined lyrics, Anne Lambert of Number One wrote: "[Martin Gore]'s protest songs are serious and sharply observed, but they retain that distinctive ear for a commercial melody". She concludes: "It's impossible to pick out tracks, as the whole effect is sharp, tight, smooth and absolutely riveting!" In Smash Hits, Peter Martin notes that the band's attention is now turned "outwards to the world (and all its problems)", pointing out the Russian, European and Oriental influences apparent in the music. He goes on: "The songs are still electronically based, but the brilliantly melodic and bouncy edge is contrasted by a brooding 'Tin Drum'-type sparseness." Summing up, Martin calls the album "[a] brave departure" and that the band had "made a bold and lovely pop record. Simple as that."

NME hailed the album, saying that "Everything Counts" "is Mode's best ever single [...] It sold because it combines edgy and poignant melodies held in thrilling tension; a tough, urgent dancebeat; and a gleamingly modern sound with an element of quirkiness to mark it out in the crowd. And the same goes for every other track on the album." Reviewer Mat Snow qualified Wilder's composition "Two Minute Warning" as "a haunting melody whose transition from verse to chorus explodes in one of those breathtakingly uplifting moments" and concluded that Depeche Mode "have made a bold and lovely pop record. Simple as that."

Commenting on the results of the band's new line-up, AllMusic's Ned Raggett considers Construction Time Again to be "a bit hit and miss... [although] when it does hit, it does so perfectly". Singling out "Love, in Itself", Raggett observes: "Depeche never sounded quite so thick with its sound before, with synths arranged into a mini-orchestra/horn section and real piano and acoustic guitar spliced in at strategic points." Regarding Wilder's songwriting, Raggett states: "Wilder's... songwriting contributions are fine musically, but lyrically, 'preachy' puts it mildly, especially the environment-friendly 'The Landscape Is Changing'."

PopMatters reviewer Michael Keefe claimed it "marked the shift of this movement away from the band's bouncier beginnings. Leaving behind the perky synth pop of 'Just Can't Get Enough' (from Speak & Spell) and 'See You' (of A Broken Frame), 'Love, in Itself' consented to offer a beat you could dance to, but it bore a heart of darkness. Martin Gore expressed his gloomy view on the redemptive potential of love to cure 'All of the absurdities that lay before us / All of the doubts and uncertainties that lay in store for us.' The track 'Pipeline', meanwhile, is unrelentingly depressing. It's also overly lethargic. 'More Than a Party' is up-tempo, but far from upbeat. It's seething, pre-industrial groove prefigured the following album's musically similar, yet vastly superior, 'Master and Servant'."

== Live performances ==
Most of the songs from Construction Time Again were performed extensively during Depeche Mode's 1983–1984 Construction Time Again Tour in support of the album. "More Than a Party" was played live on their 1986 Black Celebration Tour, a performance of which was released as the B-side to their 1986 single "A Question of Time". "Everything Counts" became a staple of their live shows, performed on the 1984 Some Great Reward Tour, the 1987–88 Music for the Masses Tour, the 1993–1994 Devotional Tour, the 2005–2006 Touring the Angel Tour, the 2017–2018 Global Spirit Tour, and the 2023–2024 Memento Mori World Tour. Performances from these tours were released on The World We Live In and Live in Hamburg (1985), 101 (1989), Devotional (1993), Touring the Angel: Live in Milan (2006), Spirits in the Forest (2019), and Depeche Mode: M (2025), respectively.

== Legacy ==
Years later, Gahan had a mixed view of the album, saying

"despite its flaws, I think of that as one of our purer albums. Musically, I guess some of it was forced. Maybe we were trying too hard at the time. It was a massive changing point for us, both musically and lyrically. We were attempting to sample too much and trying to give a message without thinking so much of the structure of the song. We were missing the point, really. ... We'd spend too much time and energy researching the album, without really concentrating on the songs."

Wilder said of the album,

"I like Construction Time Again because of its freshness and ambition to move forward. You can hear everything that's good about that LP in "Everything Counts", for example. Not only did Martin [Gore] break away from his very poppy style of writing - venturing towards more diverse subjects - but the sampler appeared on the scene for the first time. To me, there's a positive integrity about the LP."

== Track listing ==
All tracks are written by Martin L. Gore, except "Two Minute Warning" and "The Landscape Is Changing" by Alan Wilder. All lead vocals by Dave Gahan, except where noted.

Side one
No.	Title	Lead vocals	Length
1.	"Love, in Itself"		4:29
2.	"More Than a Party"		4:45
3.	"Pipeline"	Gore	5:54
4.	"Everything Counts"	Gahan; Gore	4:20

Side two
No.	Title	Lead vocals	Length
5.	"Two Minute Warning"		4:13
6.	"Shame"	Gahan; Gore	3:51
7.	"The Landscape Is Changing"		4:49
8.	"Told You So"		4:26
9.	"And Then..." (includes the hidden track "Everything Counts (Reprise)")		5:39
Total length:			42:26

CD
No.	Title	Length
9.	"And Then..."	4:35
10.	"Everything Counts (Reprise)"	1:05
Total length:		42:27

USA and Canadian CD
No.	Title	Length
9.	"And Then.../Everything Counts (Reprise)"	5:40
10.	"Everything Counts" (Long Version)	7:23
Total length:		49:50

=== 2007 Collectors Edition CD + DVD ===
Disc one (CD)
No.	Title	Length
1.	"Love, in Itself"	4:29
2.	"More Than a Party"	4:45
3.	"Pipeline"	5:54
4.	"Everything Counts"	4:20
5.	"Two Minute Warning"	4:13
6.	"Shame"	3:51
7.	"The Landscape Is Changing"	4:49
8.	"Told You So"	4:26
9.	"And Then..."	5:39
10.	"Everything Counts (Reprise)" (hidden track)	0:59

Disc two (DVD): DTS 5.1, Dolby Digital 5.1, PCM Stereo
No.	Title	Length
1.	"Depeche Mode: 1983 (Teenagers Growing Up, Bad Government, and All That Stuff)" (a short film)	38:56
2.	"Love, in Itself"	4:29
3.	"More Than a Party"	4:46
4.	"Pipeline"	5:55
5.	"Everything Counts"	4:21
6.	"Two Minute Warning"	4:13
7.	"Shame"	3:52
8.	"The Landscape Is Changing"	4:49
9.	"Told You So"	4:27
10.	"And Then..."	4:40
11.	"Everything Counts (Reprise)" (hidden track)	0:59

Disc two (DVD) additional tracks: PCM Stereo
No.	Title	Writer(s)	Length
11.	"Get the Balance Right!"		3:17
12.	"The Great Outdoors!"	Gore; Wilder	5:04
13.	"Work Hard"	Gore; Wilder	4:24
14.	"Fools"	Wilder	4:17
15.	"Get the Balance Right!" (Combination Mix)		8:01
16.	"Everything Counts (In Larger Amounts)"		7:22
17.	"Love, in Itself.4"		4:40

== Personnel ==
Credits adapted from the liner notes of Construction Time Again.

- Daniel Miller – production
- Depeche Mode – production
  - Andy Fletcher
  - Dave Gahan
  - Martin Gore
  - Alan Wilder
- Gareth Jones – tonmeister
- Corinne Simcock – engineering assistance on "Two Minute Warning"
- Brian Griffin – cover photography
- Ian Wright – illustrations
- Martyn Atkins – design

== Charts ==
=== Weekly charts ===
Weekly chart performance for Construction Time Again
Chart (1983)	Peak position
Canada Top Albums/CDs (RPM)	82
Dutch Albums (Album Top 100)	32
German Albums (Offizielle Top 100)	7
New Zealand Albums (RMNZ)	44
Swedish Albums (Sverigetopplistan)	12
Swiss Albums (Schweizer Hitparade)	21
UK Albums (Official Charts)	6
UK Independent Albums (MRIB)	1

=== Year-end charts ===
1983 year-end chart performance for Construction Time Again
Chart (1983)	Position
UK Albums (Gallup)	85

1984 year-end chart performance for Construction Time Again
Chart (1984)	Position
German Albums (Offizielle Top 100)	69

== Certifications ==
Certifications for Construction Time Again
Region	Certification	Certified units/sales
Germany (BVMI)	Gold	250,000^{^}
United Kingdom (BPI)	Gold	100,000^{^}
^{^} Shipments figures based on certification alone.
