= People Are People (album) =

Compilation album by Depeche Mode
- Released: 2 July 1984
- Recorded: 1981–1984
- Length: 43:00
- Labels: Sire; Mute
- Producers: Depeche Mode; Daniel Miller

Depeche Mode chronology
| Construction Time Again (1983) | People Are People (1984) | Some Great Reward (1984) |

People Are People is a compilation album by the English electronic music band Depeche Mode, released only in North America by Sire Records on 2 July 1984.

== Release ==
US record label Sire Records assembled People Are People after Depeche Mode's previous album, Construction Time Again, failed to chart in the US. Containing (and named after) their latest single, "People Are People", the compilation album was released on 2 July 1984 with catalogue number 1-25124. The rest of the album tracks were a "bizarre mixture" of the band's recent songs, with band member Alan Wilder saying the track listing was created "out of necessity, without any real continuity."

The album did not initially sell well in 1984, but it re-entered the charts and sold better when the title track became a summer hit in the US in mid-1985. The album later was certified Gold by the RIAA for shipments of half a million copies.

The release of "People Are People" and its namesake single both helped boost Depeche Mode's popularity in the US. When they played to US audiences in March and April 1985, they were surprised by the large crowds; they had not toured the US since 1983 due to low attendance for their A Broken Frame tour that year. Martin Gore later said "we thought that we would never be popular in America. And when we went back in 1985, we'd suddenly become this cult phenomenon. And we were playing for 15,000 people a night."

The album, with photography by Brian Griffin, was originally released on LP and CD with the band name and album name missing from the album cover; these names were then added to the covers for later re-releases.

== Critical reception ==
Professional ratings
Review scores
| Source | Rating |
|---|---|
| AllMusic | 2.5/5 stars |
| The Encyclopedia of Popular Music | 3/5 stars |
| The Rolling Stone Album Guide | 2/5 stars |

AllMusic were mixed in their reception to the album, rating the album two-and-a-half stars out of five.

== Track listing ==
All tracks are written by Martin L. Gore, except "Work Hard", written by Gore and Alan Wilder. All vocals by Dave Gahan, except "Pipeline", sung by Gore.

| No. | Title | Original album | Length |
|---|---|---|---|
| 1. | "People Are People" | Some Great Reward | 3:45 |
| 2. | "Now This Is Fun" | "See You" 7-inch single | 3:23 |
| 3. | "Love, in Itself" | Construction Time Again | 4:21 |
| 4. | "Work Hard" | "Everything Counts" 7-inch single | 4:21 |
| 5. | "Told You So" | Construction Time Again | 4:27 |
| 6. | "Get the Balance Right!" | Non-album single | 3:13 |
| 7. | "Leave in Silence" | A Broken Frame | 4:00 |
| 8. | "Pipeline" | Construction Time Again | 6:10 |
| 9. | "Everything Counts (In Larger Amounts)" | "Everything Counts" 12-inch single | 7:20 |
| Total length: | | | 43:00 |

== Release history ==
| Region | Date | Format(s) | Label(s) | Catalog |
|---|---|---|---|---|
| Canada | 2 July 1984 | LP | Sire | 9 25124-1 |
| United States | 2 July 1984 | Cassette | Sire | 9 25124-4 |
| United States and Canada | 16 March 1987 | CD | Sire | 9 25124-2 |

== Certifications ==
| Region | Certification | Certified units/sales |
|---|---|---|
| United States (RIAA) | Gold | 500,000^{^} |
^{^} Shipments figures based on certification alone.
