= The World We Live In and Live in Hamburg =

Video by Depeche Mode
- Released: 1985
- Recorded: 14 December 1984
- Venue: Alsterdorfer Sporthalle (Hamburg, West Germany)
- Genre: Synth-pop; industrial; alternative dance; new wave
- Length: 75:57
- Label: Virgin
- Director: Clive Richardson
- Producer: Mellisa Stokes

Depeche Mode chronology
The World We Live In and Live in Hamburg (1985)	Some Great Videos (1985)

The World We Live In and Live in Hamburg is the first video release by Depeche Mode, featuring almost an entire concert from their 1984 Some Great Reward Tour, at the Alsterdorfer Sporthalle in Hamburg, West Germany on 14 December 1984. Directed by Clive Richardson, and released by Virgin Records, the name is a play on a lyric of the song "Somebody" (She will listen to me, when I want to speak about the world we live in and life in general...).

Released on VHS, Betamax and LaserDisc by Virgin Records in 1985, the track listing was shortened on US releases from its counterparts in Japan and the UK.

== Background ==
Depeche Mode had released their fourth studio album, Some Great Reward, on 24 September 1984 in the US and Europe. In support of the album, the band embarked on the Some Great Reward Tour in September 1984, playing dates in the UK in September and October, Europe in November and December, then the US in March and April 1985 before returning to Europe in July.

Depeche Mode played two non-consecutive nights in Hamburg, West Germany at the Alsterdorfer Sporthalle on 9 and 14 December 1984. Recorded the second of the two nights, the video was directed by Clive Richardson, who had been responsible for many of the recent Depeche Mode videos of the era, including "People Are People", "Master and Servant" and "Somebody", all from Some Great Reward.

== Release ==
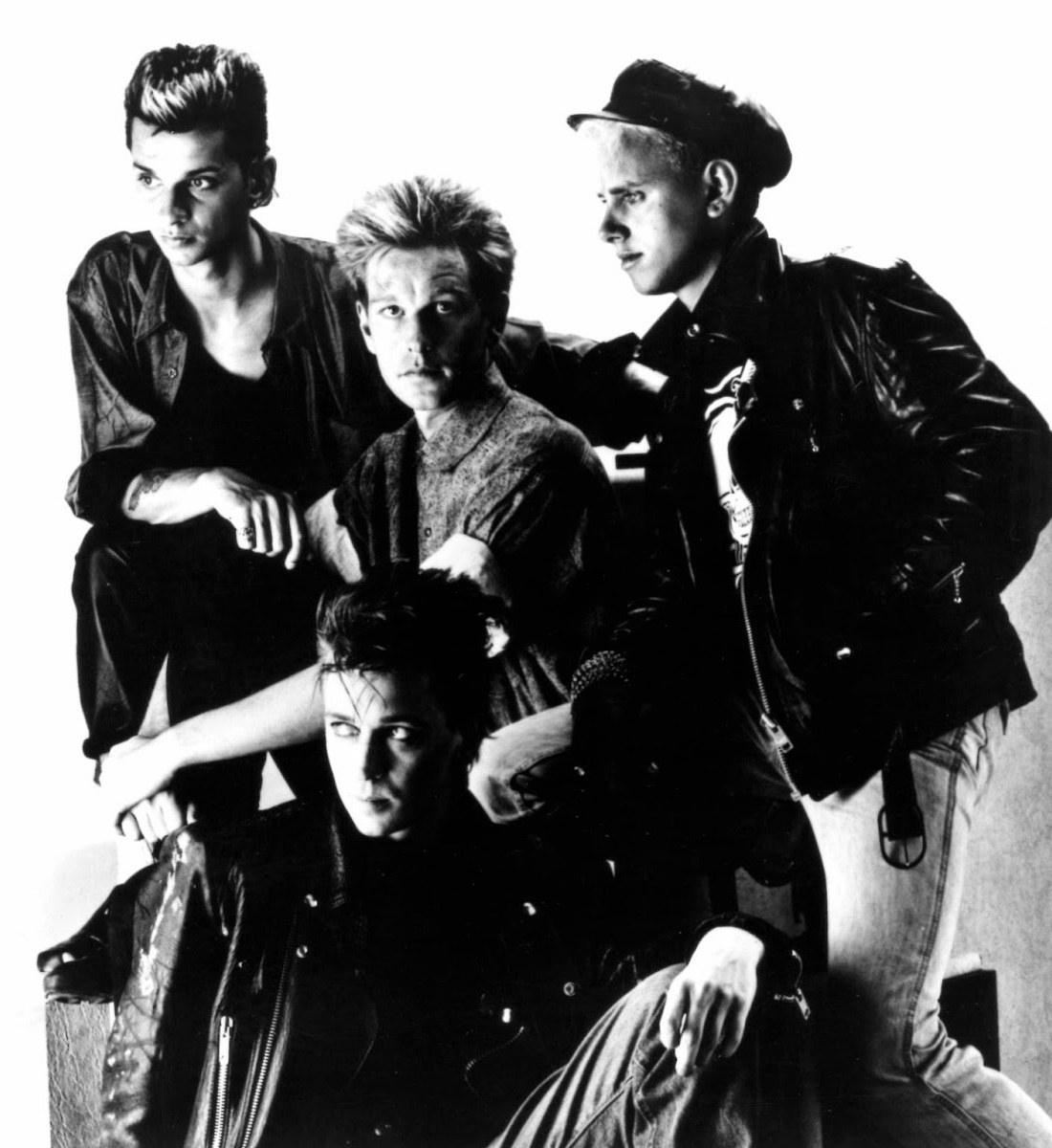
Depeche Mode in a 1984 publicity photo for Some Great Reward

The World We Live In and Live in Hamburg was Depeche Mode's first full length live concert video release, although an earlier live video release from their A Broken Frame tour had been recorded before being shelved in 1982. (Note: Some of the audio tracks from that cancelled release were released in 1983 as the B-sides to several of their singles: "Get the Balance Right!", "Everything Counts" and "Love, in Itself".) Depeche Mode's label, Mute Records, was not staffed or equipped to release a concert video, so Virgin Records was selected to do so instead. In the UK, the concert was released on both VHS and Betamax formats, with catalogue number WD063, while the US and Japan saw VHS and LaserDisc variants. The US release was shortened by 6 songs, and no region included two tracks performed at the concert, "Ice Machine" and "Puppets", both from the Vince Clarke Speak & Spell era.

When many of Depeche Mode's concert videos were re-released on DVD in the 2000s, The World We Live In and Live in Hamburg was not among them, as it was felt that the image quality of the video was not good enough to warrant the release.

== Track listing ==
UK / Japanese releases

1. "Something to Do"
2. "Two Minute Warning"
3. "If You Want"
4. "People Are People"
5. "Leave in Silence"
6. "New Life"
7. "Shame"
8. "Somebody"
9. "Lie to Me"
10. "Blasphemous Rumours"
11. "Told You So"
12. "Master and Servant"
13. "Photographic"
14. "Everything Counts"
15. "See You"
16. "Shout!"
17. "Just Can't Get Enough"

US release

1. "Something to Do"
2. "If You Want"
3. "People Are People"
4. "Somebody"
5. "Lie to Me"
6. "Blasphemous Rumours"
7. "Told You So"
8. "Master and Servant"
9. "Photographic"
10. "Everything Counts"
11. "Just Can't Get Enough"

- "Photographic" was later included on the music video compilation Some Great Videos.
- All songs were written by Martin Gore except "Two Minute Warning" and "If You Want", which were written by Alan Wilder. "New Life", "Photographic", "Shout!", and "Just Can't Get Enough" were written by Vince Clarke.

== Personnel ==
- Dave Gahan – lead vocals (except on "Somebody")
- Martin Gore – keyboards, melodica, recorder, percussion pad, metal pipes, lead, co-lead and backing vocals
- Alan Wilder – keyboards, percussion pad, corrugated iron, backing vocals, vocals on "If You Want"
- Andy Fletcher – keyboards, percussion pad, bikewheel, backing vocals
