= Leave in Silence =

- 12″ single cover

Single by Depeche Mode

from the album A Broken Frame
- B-side: "Excerpt From: My Secret Garden"
- Released: 16 August 1982
- Recorded: July 1982
- Studio: Blackwing (London)
- Genre: Synth-pop
- Length: 4:51 (album version); 4:00 (7″ version); 6:32 (12″ version); 3:42 (quieter version)
- Label: Mute
- Songwriter: Martin L. Gore
- Producers: Depeche Mode; Daniel Miller

Depeche Mode singles chronology
"The Meaning of Love" (1982)	"Leave in Silence" (1982)	"Get the Balance Right!" (1983)

Music video
- "Leave in Silence" on YouTube

Professional ratings
Review scores
Source	Rating
AllMusic	3/5 stars

"Leave in Silence" is a song by English electronic music band Depeche Mode and was released as the third single from their second studio album, A Broken Frame (1982), on 16 August 1982. Recorded at Blackwing Studios, the single became the band's fifth UK Top 20 hit, peaking at number 18. It was the first Depeche Mode single in the UK to use the "BONG" catalogue number system.

== Background and recording ==
Depeche Mode had released their first album, Speak & Spell in 1981 and shortly after its release, founding band member Vince Clarke left the band. Songwriting duties fell to Martin Gore, and the first two singles the band released after Clarke's departure were songs Gore had already written when he was younger, "See You" and "The Meaning of Love", both released in 1982. "Leave in Silence" was the first new song the band wrote together after Clarke's departure, and represented a new "creative phase" for the band's songwriting and sound, with Gore remembering that the song was the "turning point" for the band as they started to stand on their own without Clarke. Written to be more experimental than the pop songs that had preceded it for the band, singer Dave Gahan said later of the song that "it kind of summed up the whole of the second album. Rather than continue to do these lightweight poppy songs, we decided to experiment. Martin can write pop songs, but we wanted to try something totally different, just to see if we could."

Recorded at Blackwing Studios like all the Depeche Mode material that preceded it, "Leave in Silence" benefited from an upgraded 16-track mixing desk at Blackwing; when recording their first album at Blackwing a year earlier, they only had access to an 8-track mixing desk, which limited the band's ability to layer in more sounds or provide overdubs.

== Release and promotion ==
"Leave in Silence" was released as the third single on 16 August 1982, about a month before A Broken Frame. It was the first Depeche Mode single in the UK to use the "BONG" catalogue number system, which got its name from an Australian magazine he was reading at the time, and was a reference to cannabis culture, which Gore found funny. Every Depeche Mode single released after "Leave in Silence" received an incremented "BONG" designation, until the band's departure from the MUTE label after 2011. Mute records released the single on 7" and 12" vinyl with the designations 7BONG1 and 12BONG1, respectively. In Germany, label Intercord released the single on red vinyl with catalogue number INT 111.806. RCA Records released promotional 7" and 12" vinyl singles in Spain. "Leave in Silence" was not released in the US due to the then-recent release of their previous single, "See You"; the eventual US & Japanese releases of A Broken Frame instead included the 12" remix of "Leave in Silence" instead of the album version, which appeared in all other regions.

Photography on the 7" single was taken by Brian Griffin, who had taken the cover art photos for both Speak & Spell and the upcoming A Broken Frame albums. Cover design was done by Martyn Atkins, his first of many for the band, and the calligraphy was done by Ching Ching Lee.

"Leave in Silence" was made available on later compilation albums, including People Are People (1984), The Singles 81→85 (1985), and a new remix was released on Remixes 2: 81–11 (2011).

A music video for "Leave in Silence" was directed by Julien Temple, but due to the band's dislike for many of their early videos, it was not made generally available until their Video Singles Collection video compilation was released in 2016.

A live version of "Leave in Silence" was included on the 1984 concert video The World We Live In and Live in Hamburg in the UK and Japanese regions; the US release omitted the song as well as five others performed at the concert.

== Critical reception ==
In 2017, Billboard magazine writer Andrew Unterberger stated that the song "stands today as their most regrettably overlooked classic", describing it as "A shimmering and simmering synth-pop mini-epic whose brilliance comes in its relative restraint — keys sparkle and then dissipate, built-up tension dissolves into instrumental negative space, the title is practically whispered as the chorus climax. It’s the rare breakup ballad that attempts to tiptoe out the back door rather than loudly storm out the front, having already had enough of all the drama". In a 1986 band biography, the song was described as an "absolute departure" from the then-established "Depeche Mode sound". Gahan said "There were a couple of other things [tracks] we could have released which could have gone straight into the charts and been really successful, but it just didn't seem right. You can't just carry on releasing stuff every few months and having hits with something catchy."

== Track listing ==
All tracks written by Martin L. Gore

7″: Mute / 7Bong1 (UK)

1. "Leave in Silence" – 4:00
2. "Excerpt From: My Secret Garden" – 3:16

12″: Mute / 12Bong1 (UK)

1. "Leave in Silence" (longer) – 6:32
2. "Further Excerpts From: My Secret Garden" – 4:23
3. "Leave in Silence" (quieter) – 3:42

CD: Mute / CDBong1 (UK) – released in 1991

1. "Leave in Silence" – 4:00
2. "Excerpt From: My Secret Garden" – 3:16
3. "Leave in Silence" (longer) – 6:32
4. "Further Excerpts From: My Secret Garden" – 4:23
5. "Leave in Silence" (quieter) – 3:42

CD: Sire / 40294-2 (US) – released in 1991

1. "Leave in Silence" – 4:00
2. "Excerpt From: My Secret Garden" – 3:16
3. "Leave in Silence" (longer) – 6:32
4. "Further Excerpts From: My Secret Garden" – 4:23
5. "Leave in Silence" (quieter) – 3:42

== Charts ==
Weekly chart performance for "Leave in Silence"
Chart (1982)	Peak position
Ireland (IRMA)	13
Sweden (Sverigetopplistan)	17
UK Singles (Official Charts)	18
UK Indie (MRIB)	1
West Germany (GfK)	58
