= A Broken Frame =

1982 studio album by Depeche Mode

Studio album by Depeche Mode
- Released: 27 September 1982
- Recorded: December 1981 – July 1982
- Studio: Blackwing (London)
- Genres: Synth-pop; new wave
- Length: 40:52
- Label: Mute
- Producers: Depeche Mode; Daniel Miller

Depeche Mode chronology
| Speak & Spell (1981) | A Broken Frame (1982) | Construction Time Again (1983) |

Singles from A Broken Frame
- 1. "See You" Released: 29 January 1982; 2. "The Meaning of Love" Released: 26 April 1982; 3. "Leave in Silence" Released: 16 August 1982

A Broken Frame is the second studio album recorded by the English electronic music band Depeche Mode, working as a trio, and released on 27 September 1982 by Mute Records. The album was written entirely by Martin Gore and was recorded as a trio after the departure of Vince Clarke, who had left in December 1981 and formed Yazoo with singer Alison Moyet. Alan Wilder was hired in Clarke's place, initially as a touring musician only. Consequently, he was not involved with the recording of A Broken Frame, but was promoted to official band membership in October 1982, the month after the album's release.

The album reached number eight on the UK Albums Chart and was promoted by the singles "See You", "The Meaning of Love" and "Leave in Silence", all three of which reached the top 20 of the UK singles charts.

== Background ==
Depeche Mode had released their first album Speak & Spell in October 1981 and after the subsequent tour was completed in early December, founding member Vince Clarke left the band. That same month, the remaining members of Depeche Mode, Martin Gore, Andrew Fletcher and Dave Gahan, went back to Blackwing Studios to record a new song, as they felt the pressure to continue the band after a string of successful singles, despite having lost its main songwriter. In addition, all three had quit their jobs or university, and none of them wanted to return to their old lives. Rather than write a new song, they re-arranged and recorded a song Gore had written as a teenager called "See You". Producer Daniel Miller remembered that Gore's demo for the song was "very basic, just a melody on a Casio synth and Martin tapping the beat with his foot." This was in contrast to how Vince Clarke had a strong musical vision and direction during the Speak & Spell sessions, but the shortcomings of the demo were overcome by the band's enthusiasm and energy. A PPG Wave 2 synthesizer, purchased by Gore from his royalties, was used by the band for the first time in recording the song. Released on 29 January 1982 in the UK, "See You" went on to reach number 6 on the UK charts. To support the song, Depeche Mode embarked on the See You Tour, with shows in the UK, Europe and the US from January to May 1982. In January 1982, the band were already talking to the press about making a new album, with an article in Best magazine saying the new album would "be different. More mature. More personal. They want to talk about serious things. About life, death, and society. They want to be taken seriously."

=== Hiring Alan Wilder ===
Although the band were initially hesitant to replace Clarke, their heavy tour commitments forced them to relent to pressure from their producer Daniel Miller, and to find a musician to play the tour, the band put an advertisement in the music magazine Melody Maker stating "Synth / Vocals needed for electronic pop group with UK & International commitments – must be under 21." Despite being 22 years old, musician Alan Wilder was hired as a result. The band needed someone who could play well, as Fletcher had said in an interview the previous year, "None of us play piano. ... You'd have to go into it seriously, and we haven't got the time." Gahan recalled later that "we auditioned [potential replacements] at Blackwing, and all these strange and wonderful characters showed up. And they were all dressed up to the nines, but couldn't play. And Alan [Wilder] came along and could play anything." Wilder, who had trained as a classical musician and was able to play flute, piano and brass instruments, admitted he didn't know much about electronic music when he auditioned, but he knew who Depeche Mode were before he decided to go and try out for the part. At the audition, he found that he could play along with the band immediately and easily, and since he was desperate for a job, he was happy to join. Wilder found Gahan, Fletcher and Gore to be very shy and, to avoid confrontation, the trio often asked Miller to deliver news, be it good or bad. Initially hired as a touring musician and paid a weekly wage, Wilder's first show with Depeche Mode was a warm-up gig at Croc's in Rayleigh, England, on 20 January 1982. Fans seemed to accept Wilder's place within the touring band quickly. Anne Swindell, Gore's girlfriend, noticed that fans were screaming Wilder's name at shows within the first month of him joining, saying "I'm glad they're screaming for Alan [Wilder]. It makes him feel more a part of it." Within a month, the band, without Wilder, returned to Blackwing Studios to record another song Gore had written when he was younger, "The Meaning of Love". As a way of explaining Wilder's exclusion from the sessions, Fletcher said in interviews that "at the moment he [Wilder] is a live session man. He just plays live for us, not in the studio, but that might change." Said Gahan, "I don't think it's right really, not yet, it's just like someone jumping in after you've been together for two years. And if he came in the studio now it would be hard for him to fit in." Released on 26 April 1982, "The Meaning of Love" reached number 12 on the UK charts.

== Recording ==
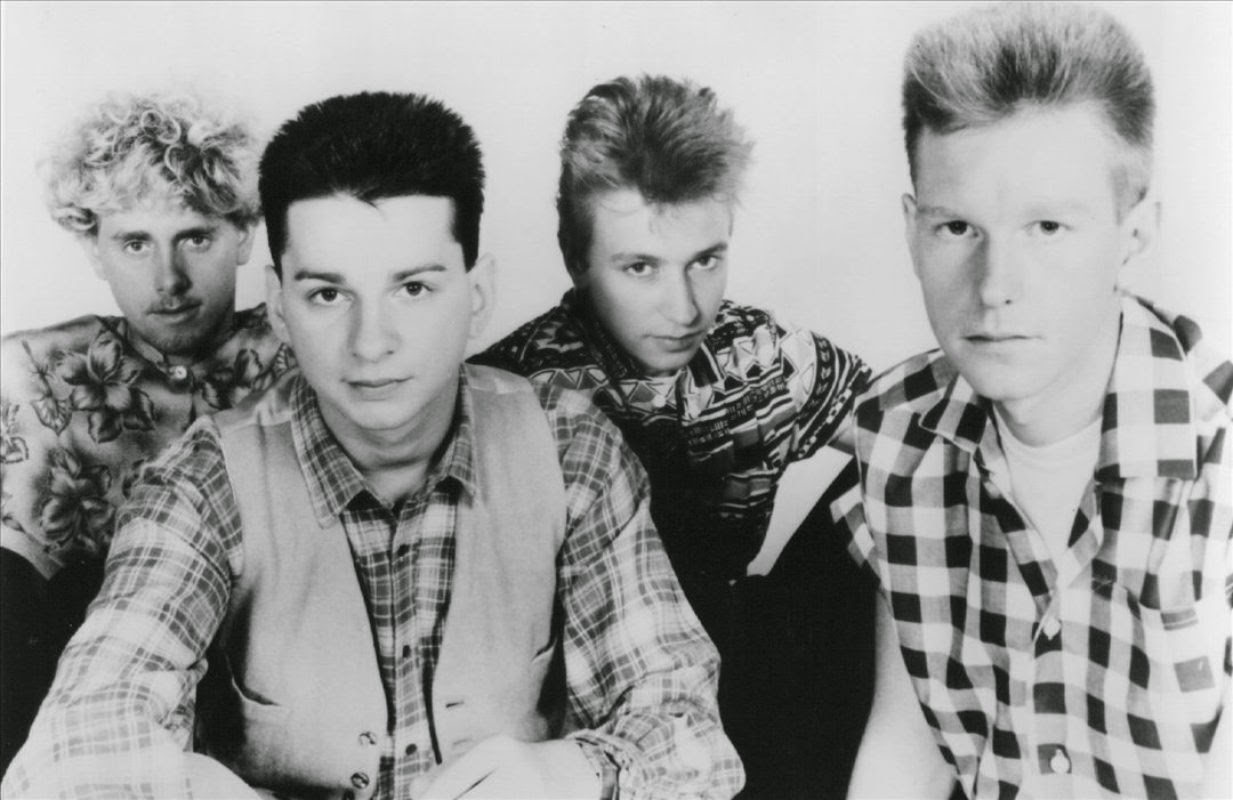
Depeche Mode in 1982, from L to R: Martin Gore, Dave Gahan, Alan Wilder and Andrew Fletcher. Wilder did not appear on the album, but performed live from this period.

In July 1982, the trio went into the studio to begin work on more songs for their second album, A Broken Frame. Wilder, who had now been touring with the band for 6 months, had hoped to be a part of the album's recording, but as he was a paid touring musician, he was not invited to join. Said Wilder, "I'd done my bit and I thought I warranted involvement. I had something to contribute. They said no [through Miller]. The problem was that they had something to prove to themselves. The three of them didn't want the press to say they'd just roped in a musician to make things easier after Vince [Clarke] left. I was pretty upset, and there was ill-feeling from me about that."

Gore felt pressure as the band's sole songwriter, as he had only contributed two tracks to their previous album, one of which was an instrumental. The first new song he wrote for the album was "Leave in Silence", a darker and more experimental track than the previous songs. Due to the mix of newly-written and re-arranged older songs like the first two singles, the sound of the album was described as "varied", with some "sugary pop songs" like "A Photograph of You" and some more "mature" recordings, like "The Sun & the Rainfall". The band had delivered two lighter pop songs already, "See You" and "The Meaning of Love", both of which would be included on the album, because they felt that's what was expected of them after their previous album. Miller later recalled that "most of" the songs on A Broken Frame were older songs that Gore had written when he was younger. Gore later said that the band were "finding their feet" during this time as the track list was a collection of songs he had written in his teens combined with the new material he wrote in the studio in 1982. Of his writing, Gore said "I write about anything really, whatever it is I just exaggerate it." Miller said that the instrumental track "Nothing to Fear" gained its title from Gore, who was "reading some weird book during the making of the record, a book of prophecies or something and he looked up his birthdate and it said, 'Nothing to fear.' So that actually ended up being a track title, and it made him very optimistic about the future."

Blackwing Studios had upgraded their recording booth to a 16-track desk, which allowed the songs of A Broken Frame to be recorded more traditionally than the "live" technique used for Speak & Spell. During the recording sessions, the band tried to incorporate sampled sounds into their music for the first time: for the sound of boots marching in "Shouldn't Have Done That", they recruited the band Blancmange, who were recording at the same studio, to march in front of microphones. Depeche Mode would continue sampling "found" sounds on their subsequent albums as well. Miller recalled that the process of production was quite different from the previous album, saying "It was almost like a blank sheet of paper, the songs were recorded in a different way because Vince [Clarke] had a very specific idea of what the song was going to end up sounding like, and Martin [Gore] didn't really have that. It was more like, 'Here's the words, here's the melody. Let's figure it out.' Miller also believed that "some of the more experimental elements of the band came out in A Broken Frame, which I enjoyed. They were making pop records, but they, especially Martin, were into experimental music and that started to feed into tracks like 'Monument'." Explaining how the band used their synthesisers to get the drum tracks, Gore said "we've always used an ARP 2600 for the bass drum because we've never found a drum machine with a powerful enough bass drum sound. We run it through the sequencer. We like the snare sound on our Roland TR-808. Our Korg KR-55 also has quite a good snare."

In an interview released in late August 1982, Gahan said "we've done eight tracks now and we're in the middle of the ninth with one more to go," adding "whereas the stuff on the last album was Euro macho dance music really, beaty synthesizer music, this album's a lot weightier." Said Gore, the new material is "getting away from dance music. It's not that you can't dance to it – it's just that the charts are getting too dance orientated. Our publishers advise us to write dance hits. In America they tell us we won't have a hit if we don't do a dance number, because the only way they can break a record through there is through the discos."

The band saw Vince Clarke's band Yazoo was having chart success with the singles from their album Upstairs at Eric's (1982), "Only You", "Don't Go" and "Situation", all of which were released while Depeche Mode were in the studio working on A Broken Frame.

=== Album art ===
Like on the previous album, the band had agreed to not put themselves on the front cover, as they and Mute both believed that they were "serious artists whose good artwork reflected their music." A picture of Fletcher alone did appear on the back of the original pressing of the album, a picture which was changed between early pressings for no disclosed reason. The image used as the cover for the album was taken by Brian Griffin, who had previously taken the cover photograph for Speak & Spell and contemporary press photos for the band. Griffin cited as inspirations the socialist realism of Soviet Russia, especially the work of Kazimir Malevich, and German Romanticism. Griffin has displayed on his website a gallery of alternative images from the same shoot. In 1990, Life magazine included the picture in their list of "World's Best Photographs 1980–1990".

=== Title ===
The titles of A Broken Frame and its follow-up album Construction Time Again were, according to Wilder a few years later, likely a reflection of what was going on within the group at the time, saying that the former was "some kind of comment on Vince leaving" and that the latter reflected how the band was putting itself back together.

== Release and promotion ==
Promotional poster for the album's release, including tour dates

"Leave in Silence" was released as the third single from the album on 16 August 1982 in the UK and reached number 20 on the UK charts. A Broken Frame was released on 27 September 1982 by Mute Records in the United Kingdom (catalogue number STUMM9), and Sire Records in the United States, with whom the band signed a 5-album contract earlier that year. The US release of the album included the "Longer" (12") version of "Leave in Silence" as well as the track "Further Excerpts From: My Secret Garden", which was not included on the original UK release.

=== Tour ===
The band supported the album with the A Broken Frame Tour, which ran from October 1982 through May 1983 with shows in the UK, Europe, the US and Asia. Although the album didn't sell as well as its predecessor, the supporting tour, especially in the UK, was strongly attended. The band had upgraded their transportation since their last tour, with Fletcher explaining that "now we've got a luxury coach and can do it in some style. There are video recorders and stereo on board and you can't beat a bit of comfort to put you in a good mood when you arrive in a foreign city and have to go straight to do sound checks before you can rest." On tour, the band used a variety of synthesisers, including an ARP 2600, Moog Source, Roland Promars, Roland SH-101, Roland MC-4 Microcomposer, Korg KR-55, and a Roland TR-808.

During the UK leg of the tour in October 1982, Wilder was officially inducted into the band. Said Gore, "after Vince [Clarke] left and went to form Yazoo, we were getting ready to record a new album. Alan [Wilder] started playing with us, but we wanted to make certain that any change in direction in our music wasn't attributable to Alan joining. We needed to show we were capable of musical alteration by ourselves. So we recorded Broken Frame with that in mind, although Alan will be playing on our tours when we perform songs from the album. Now we feel free for him to be a full time recording member of the group now that the change in pattern has been established!"

A video recording of the show on 25 October 1982 at the Hammersmith Odeon was made by Mute Records with the intention of making a live release, but by the time the tour was complete, the band felt they had "outgrown" the songs, and the release was scrapped. Some of the live audio recordings from the show were released as B-sides to their 1983 singles: "Get the Balance Right!", "Everything Counts" and "Love, in Itself".

A review of their live show in Brighton in Sounds in October 1982 praised the band, saying "some of the old songs are still there, fitting in neatly with the less dinky, moodier numbers that make up the band's second album", while a review in Melody Maker of their show in Birmingham a few days later was not kind, reviewing the music, stage, lighting and the band negatively.

In mid-November, while still on tour but on a break between the UK and European legs, the band including Wilder went back to the studio to record a new song, "Get the Balance Right!". The song was released as a non-album single in January 1983, before the US and Asian legs of the tour. "Get the Balance Right!" reached number 13 on the UK charts.

Attendance during the US leg of the tour was disappointing, leading to Depeche Mode not returning to the US for their 1983 Construction Time Again Tour.

== Live performances ==
Most songs from A Broken Frame were performed as part of the band's 1982–83 A Broken Frame Tour, but few tracks from the album were performed live after 1983. "See You" and "The Meaning of Love" were performed during their 1983 Construction Time Again Tour, and "Leave in Silence" was performed on the 1984 Some Great Reward Tour, a performance of which is available on UK and Japanese versions of The World We Live In and Live in Hamburg (1985).

== Critical reception ==
Professional ratings
Review scores
| Source | Rating |
|---|---|
| AllMusic | 3/5 stars |
| The Austin Chronicle | 2/5 stars |
| The Philadelphia Inquirer | 3/5 stars |
| PopMatters | 6/10 |
| Q | 3/5 stars |
| Record Mirror | 3/5 stars |
| The Rolling Stone Album Guide | 3/5 stars |
| Smash Hits | 8/10 |
| Spin Alternative Record Guide | 4/10 |
| Uncut | 2/5 stars |

Smash Hits wrote that A Broken Frame, in contrast to the group's early post-Clarke singles showed "a lack of purpose", "makes a virtue of their tinkly-bonk whimsy". In contrast, Melody Maker wrote that, although "ambitious and bold", "A Broken Frame – as its name suggests – marks the end of a beautiful dream", a comment on the departure of main songwriter Clarke. Reviewer Steve Sutherland considered the songs "daft aspirations to art", the album's musical and thematic "larcenies" sounding like "puerile infatuations papering over anonymity". At the same time, Sutherland acknowledged that the group's increasing complexity "sounds less the result of exterior persuasion than an understandable, natural development", although he finally concluded that Depeche Mode remain (in contrast to Clarke's new group Yazoo) "essentially vacuous". The comments of Noise! magazine's "DH" (most likely Noise! contributor Dave Henderson) were more favourable. "DH" said that the album "falls together well and shows we can expect a lot more from the clean cut quartet", adding "[a]t times it reaches high points far exceeding their first album."

In a retrospective review for AllMusic, Ned Raggett described A Broken Frame as "a notably more ambitious effort than the pure pop/disco of the band's debut", with much of the album "forsaking earlier sprightliness... for more melancholy reflections about love gone wrong". He added: "More complex arrangements and juxtaposed sounds, such as the sparkle of breaking glass in 'Leave in Silence', help give this underrated album even more of an intriguing, unexpected edge."

== Legacy ==
At the time, the band felt that they were being unfairly judged by the press in the UK. Said Fletcher, "people don't give us enough credit for things that we've done. Like, we manage ourselves, we've stayed on an independent label, we've always refused to be tempted by large sums of money and we've had five top 20 singles on the trot with no hype – just on our music alone! I mean, it seems to be the thing at the moment to slag off electronic bands but I think that's a bit of a fallacy." The band later regretted their "naive" approach to working with the press on this and their previous album. Depeche Mode worked hard in the second half of the 1980s, while working on Black Celebration (1986) and Music for the Masses, to shed the teenybopper image they'd acquired during their first few years as a band. Said Gahan in 1990, "I've got to accept the fact that we made a lot of mistakes in terms of the way we put ourselves across and put ourselves about. We were prepared to do anything. Not necessarily to sell ourselves. We were just completely naive. We thought it would be good to be in Smash Hits answering questions about our socks, appearing on Saturday morning television, making prats of ourselves. We didn't realise at the time that we were degrading ourselves. Then it reached a point where we realised it wasn't helping us anymore. In fact, it was becoming very negative. So we made a conscious decision to say no. From that point, we've been able to pick and choose. We decided not to make prats of ourselves anymore."

On the Asian leg of The Broken Frame Tour, which saw dates in Tokyo, Hong Kong and Bangkok, the band were particularly unsettled by the poverty and child exploitation in Thailand, which influenced the lyrical content of their next album, Construction Time Again.

In 1990, while promoting their album Violator, songwriter Martin Gore lamented parts of the album, saying, "I regret all that sickly boy-next-door stuff of the early days... musically A Broken Frame was a mish-mash". In a 2006 interview, Gore said he considered A Broken Frame to be "probably our worst album". Dave Gahan called A Broken Frame the band's "weakest album," noting that they were "learning at that point. It was very naive. It was Martin's [Gore] first album as a songwriter ... he was thrown in at the deep end, to be honest." Miller later said that the album "was a transitional record and while it's not their best record, it's hugely important in terms of how it was made and how it gave everybody confidence. It's when people really started believing in the future of the band."

== Track listing ==
All tracks are written by Martin Gore. All lead vocals by Dave Gahan, except where noted.

Side one
| No. | Title | Lead vocals | Length |
|---|---|---|---|
| 1. | "Leave in Silence" | | 4:51 |
| 2. | "My Secret Garden" | | 4:46 |
| 3. | "Monument" | | 3:15 |
| 4. | "Nothing to Fear" | instrumental | 4:18 |
| 5. | "See You" | | 4:34 |

Side two
| No. | Title | Lead vocals | Length |
|---|---|---|---|
| 6. | "Satellite" | | 4:44 |
| 7. | "The Meaning of Love" | | 3:06 |
| 8. | "A Photograph of You" | | 3:04 |
| 9. | "Shouldn't Have Done That" | Gahan; Gore | 3:12 |
| 10. | "The Sun & the Rainfall" | | 5:02 |
| Total length: | | | 40:52 |

North American edition
| No. | Title | Length |
|---|---|---|
| 1. | "Leave in Silence" | 6:28 |
| 2. | "My Secret Garden" | 4:46 |
| 3. | "Monument" | 3:15 |
| 4. | "Nothing to Fear" | 4:18 |
| 5. | "See You" | 4:34 |
| 6. | "Satellite" | 4:44 |
| 7. | "The Meaning of Love" | 3:06 |
| 8. | "Further Excerpts From: My Secret Garden" | 4:20 |
| 9. | "A Photograph of You" | 3:04 |
| 10. | "Shouldn't Have Done That" | 3:12 |
| 11. | "The Sun & the Rainfall" | 5:02 |
| Total length: | | 46:49 |

- Some original US CD copies of the album tacked the intro of "The Sun & the Rainfall" onto the end of "Shouldn't Have Done That", making the duration of "The Sun & the Rainfall" 4:54.
- Dave Gahan sings lead vocals on all songs except "Shouldn't Have Done That" which is a duet with Gore. "Nothing to Fear" and "Further Excerpts From: My Secret Garden" are instrumental.

=== 2006 Collectors Edition CD + DVD ===
- Disc one is a hybrid SACD/CD with a multi-channel SACD layer. The track listing is identical to the 1982 UK release, except "Satellite" which is 4:43 long and contains a slight edit, or error, at the beginning of the track.
- Disc two is a DVD which includes A Broken Frame in DTS 5.1, Dolby Digital 5.1 and PCM Stereo plus bonus material.

Disc one (CD)
| No. | Title | Length |
|---|---|---|
| 1. | "Leave in Silence" | 4:51 |
| 2. | "My Secret Garden" | 4:46 |
| 3. | "Monument" | 3:15 |
| 4. | "Nothing to Fear" | 4:18 |
| 5. | "See You" | 4:34 |
| 6. | "Satellite" | 4:43 |
| 7. | "The Meaning of Love" | 3:06 |
| 8. | "A Photograph of You" | 3:04 |
| 9. | "Shouldn't Have Done That" | 3:12 |
| 10. | "The Sun & the Rainfall" | 5:02 |
| Total length: | | 40:52 |

Disc two (DVD): DTS 5.1, Dolby Digital 5.1, PCM Stereo
| No. | Title | Length |
|---|---|---|
| 1. | "Depeche Mode: 1982 (The Beginning of Their So-Called Dark Phase)" (a short film) | 27:00 |
| 2. | "Leave in Silence" | 4:51 |
| 3. | "My Secret Garden" | 4:46 |
| 4. | "Monument" | 3:15 |
| 5. | "Nothing to Fear" | 4:18 |
| 6. | "See You" | 4:34 |
| 7. | "Satellite" | 4:44 |
| 8. | "The Meaning of Love" | 3:06 |
| 9. | "A Photograph of You" | 3:04 |
| 10. | "Shouldn't Have Done That" | 3:12 |
| 11. | "The Sun & the Rainfall" | 5:02 |

Disc 2 (DVD) additional tracks: DTS 5.1, Dolby Digital 5.1, PCM Stereo
| No. | Title | Length |
|---|---|---|
| 12. | "My Secret Garden" (live at the Hammersmith Odeon, 25 October 1982) | 7:28 |
| 13. | "See You" (live at the Hammersmith Odeon, 25 October 1982) | 4:11 |
| 14. | "Satellite" (live at the Hammersmith Odeon, 25 October 1982) | 4:28 |
| 15. | "Nothing to Fear" (live at the Hammersmith Odeon, 25 October 1982) | 4:28 |
| 16. | "The Meaning of Love" (live at the Hammersmith Odeon, 25 October 1982) | 3:14 |
| 17. | "A Photograph of You" (live at the Hammersmith Odeon, 25 October 1982) | 3:21 |

Disc 2 (DVD) additional tracks: PCM Stereo
| No. | Title | Length |
|---|---|---|
| 17. | "Now, This Is Fun" | 3:27 |
| 18. | "Oberkorn (It's a Small Town)" | 4:07 |
| 19. | "Excerpt From: My Secret Garden" | 3:14 |

== Personnel ==
Credits adapted from the liner notes of A Broken Frame.

=== Depeche Mode ===
- David Gahan
- Martin Gore
- Andrew Fletcher

=== Technical ===
- Daniel Miller – production
- Depeche Mode – production
- John Fryer – engineering
- Eric Radcliffe – engineering

=== Artwork ===
- Brian Griffin – photography
- Martyn Atkins – design
- Ching Ching Lee – calligraphy

== Charts ==
1982–1983 chart performance for A Broken Frame
| Chart (1982–1983) | Peak position |
|---|---|
| German Albums (Offizielle Top 100) | 56 |
| New Zealand Albums (RMNZ) | 43 |
| Swedish Albums (Sverigetopplistan) | 22 |
| UK Albums (Official Charts) | 8 |
| UK Independent Albums (MRIB) | 1 |
| US Billboard 200 | 177 |

2006 chart performance for A Broken Frame
| Chart (2006) | Peak position |
|---|---|
| French Albums (SNEP) | 194 |
| Italian Albums (FIMI) | 88 |

== Certifications ==
Certifications for A Broken Frame
| Region | Certification | Certified units/sales |
|---|---|---|
| United Kingdom (BPI) | Gold | 100,000^{^} |
^{^} Shipments figures based on certification alone.

== Marsheaux cover version ==
A Broken Frame

Studio album by Marsheaux
- Released: 18 January 2015
- Length: 45:00
- Label: Undo

Marsheaux chronology
| Inhale (2013) | A Broken Frame (2015) | Ath.Lon (2016) |

Professional ratings
Review scores
| Source | Rating |
|---|---|
| Release Magazine | 6/10 stars |

In 2015, Greek synth-pop duo Marsheaux released a complete cover version of A Broken Frame on Undo Records. Release Magazine wrote that this version was not "anything essential" but well done. The Electricity Club found influences of And One in the cover of "The Sun & the Rainfall" and concluded that Marsheaux had "used unconventional sounds and vocals to make this record their own". Reviews from Germany noted that Marsheaux had elaborated on the assets and downsides of the original release. According to Westdeutsche Allgemeine Zeitung, the kitschy sides of the early Depeche Mode album were deliberately uncovered in tracks like "The Meaning of Love", while the Sonic Seducer lauded Marsheaux's darker and slower interpretation of this song.
