= Marsheaux =

Greek synthpop duo

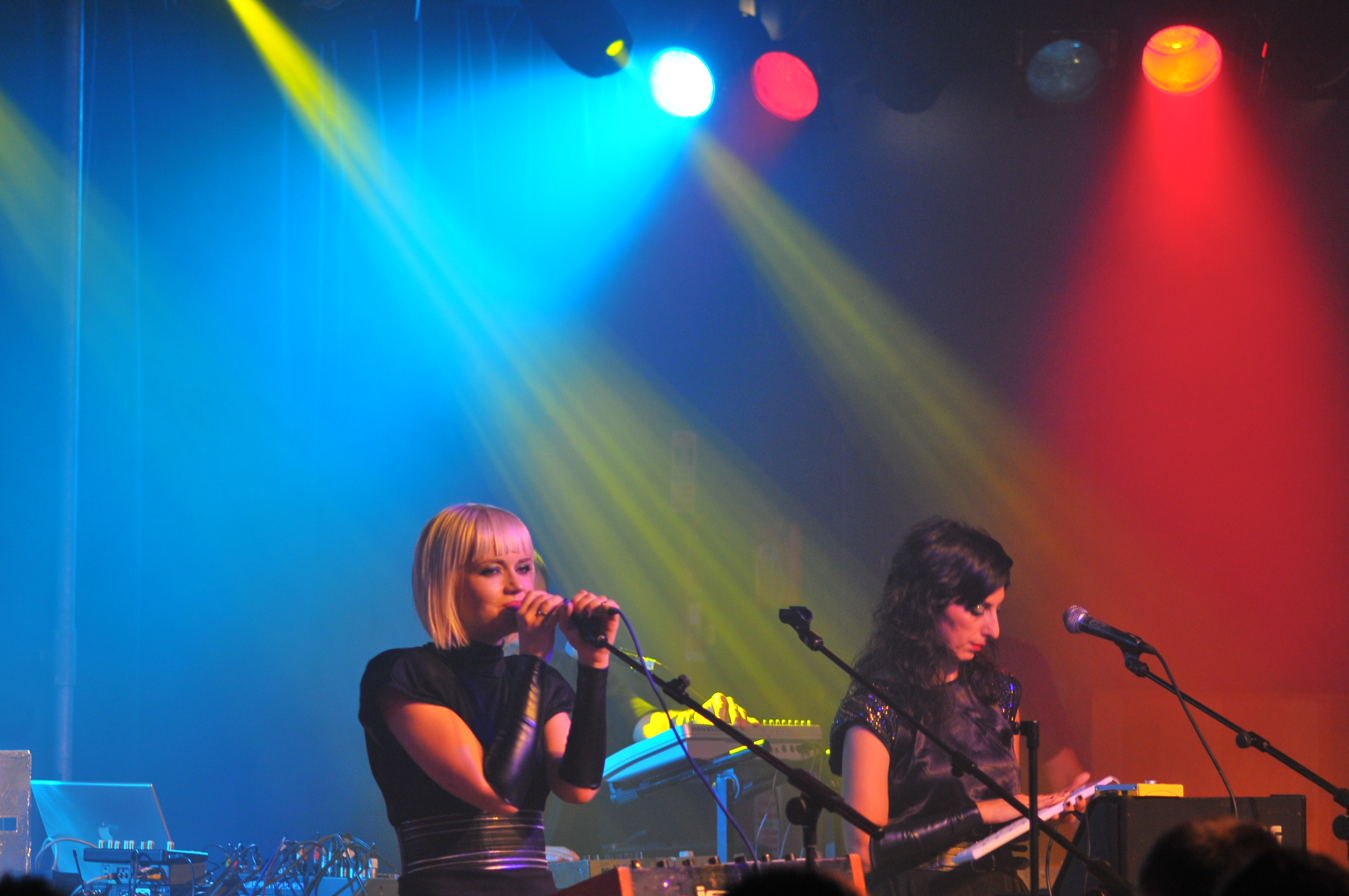
- Marianthi and Sophie

Background information
- Origin: Athens, Greece
- Genres: Synthpop, electropop
- Years active: 2003–present
- Labels: Undo Records, Out of Line
- Members: Marianthi Melitsi; Sophie Sarigiannidou
- Website: marsheaux.com

Marsheaux is a Greek synthpop duo formed in Athens in 2003. The group is composed of vocalists, songwriters and keyboardists Marianthi Melitsi and Sophie Sarigiannidou. The name Marsheaux is derived from the first syllable of each band member's name. Both members sing almost exclusively in English. Andy McCluskey of Orchestral Manoeuvres in the Dark (OMD) said about this band: "I do have a soft spot for Marsheaux I have to say. They have a certain sort of wispy, melancholic charm".

== History ==
Marianthi Melitsi and Sophie Sarigiannidou were born in Thessaloniki, Greece. In 2000, they moved to Athens and founded Marsheaux in 2003 to further their appreciation of electronic pop music. In 2015, they explained to a music blog called AZLTRON the origin of the band: "We were at a Depeche Mode party in Athens 12 years ago, and the guys from Undo Records told us that we can only play Depeche Mode themes in our synths. So we decided to form a band and make a track for a compilation they were working on, called Nu Romantics. We did a cover of Gershon Kingsley's "Popcorn", we found a name, and won the bet. We are very glad we won the bet cause if we hadn't, we would have to clean their warehouse and keep it clean for a whole year".

Marsheaux came to national prominence in Greece with their debut single, a cover of Gershon Kingsley's "Popcorn". The single received extensive airplay in Greece and mainland Europe. They continued to gain international recognition for their remixes of "Will I Ever" by In Vox featuring Andy Bell of Erasure.

Now signed to Undo Records, Marsheaux released their debut album E-Bay Queen in June 2004. The album played heavily on Marsheaux's stated influences, which include OMD, the Pet Shop Boys, Sparks, John Foxx and Depeche Mode. E-Bay Queen was critically well received internationally.

In December 2006, Undo Records released Sophie and Marianthi's follow up album Peekaboo. The album included two covers, "Regret" by New Order and "The Promise" by When in Rome. The site Electronically Yours rated it "Album of the Year 2007". The single "Hanging On" was released in 2007.

As well as recording original material, Marsheaux also remixed existing tracks of artists such as Depeche Mode, Moby, Sakis Rouvas, Gwen Stefani and Hurts. In 2008, Marsheaux recorded a version of the song "She's Leaving" by OMD. They also issued the limited 7" vinyl "Ghost", which included the B-side "Bizarre Love Duo".

In July 2009, the band released their third album, Lumineux Noir, at Undo Records/Out of Line. The album was issued in two versions: the Standard edition with 13 tracks and the Limited edition that included a bonus disc with remixes and a new song. According to the Side-Line magazine, it did not "bring an evolution in sound, but shows a growing maturity in songwriting and production". It is reminiscent of 1980s synthpop with tracks that have been compared to Ladytron, The Chemical Brothers and Client. Two singles supported the album: "Breakthrough" and "Summer".

In May 2011, Marsheaux released a new song, "Can You Stop Me?". In May 2012, the band issued the compilation of mostly unreleased material and rare songs, E-Bay Queen is Dead. A fourth album, Inhale, followed in 2013, along with a compilation drawn from all four studio albums, Odyssey.

In 2015, Marsheaux released their fifth studio album A Broken Frame, a cover album of Depeche Mode's 1982 LP of the same name. It has been seen as faithful to the original but with an updated sound, including some darker and slower interpretations of tracks like "The Meaning of Love" and "A Photograph of You" as well as a trip-hop version of "Shouldn’t Have Done That".

In May 2016, Marsheaux released a new single "Safe Tonight", that includes original and extended versions of the song and remixes by Nikonn and Fotonovela. This single is from their sixth studio album Ath.Lon, released on 16 June 2016.

== Touring ==
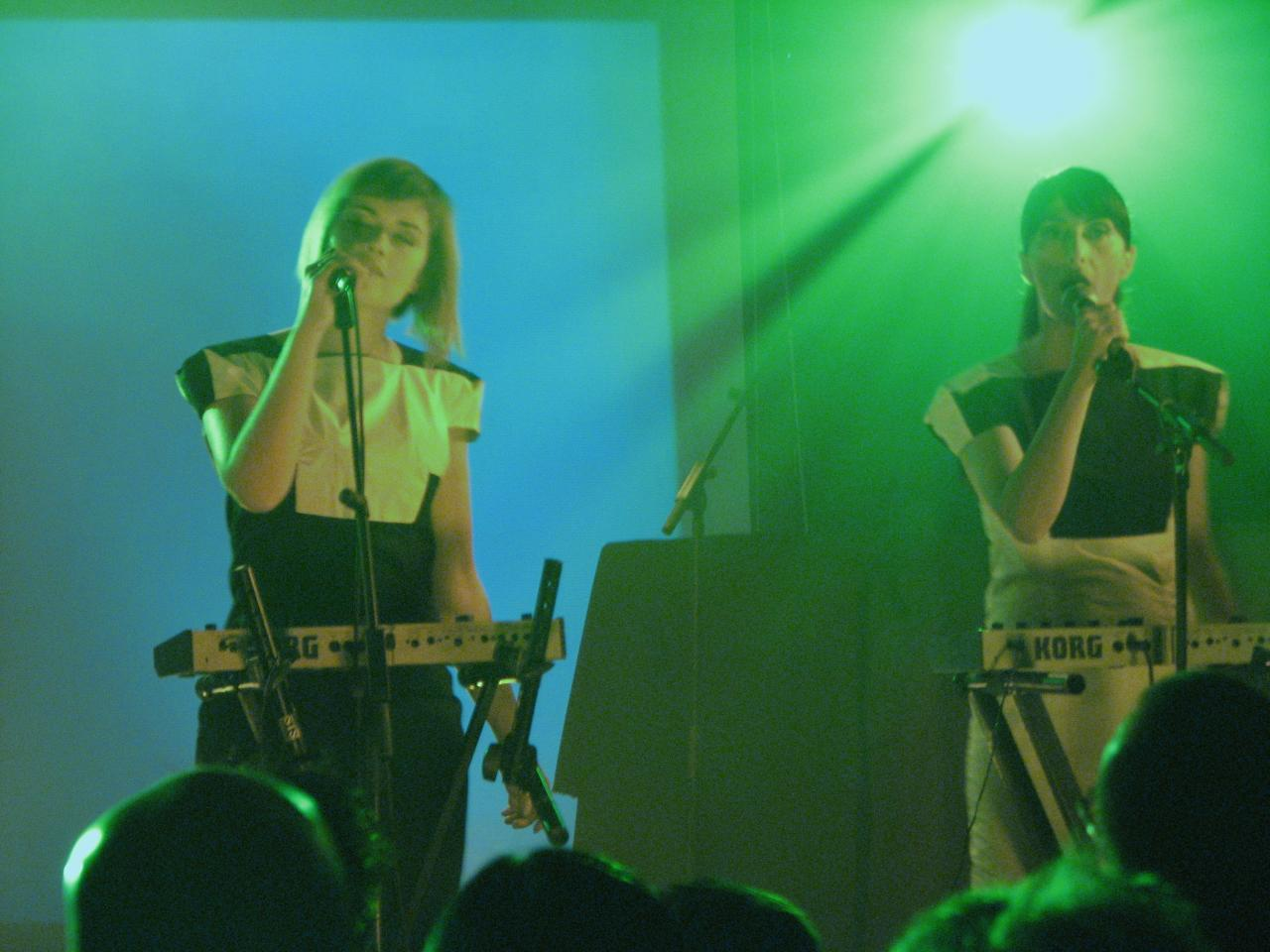
Marsheaux live at Infest 2008

Marsheaux performed live at various festivals including Infest, Pluswelt, Amphi and Exit. The duo also played support slots for OMD and Róisín Murphy in Greece, and Client in Germany. Both band members have regular guest DJ slots in clubs in Athens.

== Equipment ==
As well as being vocalists, both musicians are skilled multi-instrumentalists. Marianthi plays Microkorg, Minimoog, Roland SH101, Speak & Math and Yamaha CS01. Sophie plays Microkorg, Korg MS-10, Roland Alpha Juno2, Akai AX80, Roland CR-78, and Kurzweil K2000.

== Discography ==
=== Studio albums ===
- E-Bay Queen (2004)
- Peekaboo (2006)
- Lumineux Noir (2009)
- Inhale (2013)
- A Broken Frame/An Extended Broken Frame (2015)
- Ath.Lon (2016)

=== Compilations ===
- E-Bay Queen is Dead (2012)
- Odyssey (2013)
- Our Girls on Film (2018)
- Inhale (2019)
- Alternatives (2020)

=== Singles ===
- "Popcorn" (Undo Records, 2003)
- "Hanging On" (Undo Records, 2007)
- "Ghost" (limited 7", Undo Records, 2008)
- "Breakthrough" (Undo Records, 2009)
- "Summer" (Out of Line, 2009)
- "Safe Tonight" (Undo Records, 2016)
- "Home" (2019)

=== Other releases ===
- 2005 – "New Life" by Depeche Mode covered on the tribute compilation album Around the World and Back: A Greek Tribute To Depeche Mode, released 21 March 2005 on Undo Records.
- 2007 – "Empire State Human" covered and released 4 March 2007 as a free download to commemorate the 30th Anniversary of The Human League.
- 2007 – Remix of the song "A Dark City's Night" from the German synthpop duo Portash (located on Portash's album Framed Lives).
- 2007 – Remix of the song "It's Not Over" from the British electropop group Client.
- 2008 – Remix of the song "Perfect Girl" from the British electropop group The Ultrasonics, released 25 August 2008.
- 2015 - "We Met Bernard Sumner at a Christmas Party Last Night" released on the compilation album Ghosts of Christmas Past (Remake)
- 2017 – Get The Balance Right limited edition EP released on Undo Records
- 2018 –"Suffer the Children" by Tears for Fears covered on a 2-CD various artists compilation album called The Electricity Club. Released on 30 November 2018 on Amour Records, Minos EMI and Undo Records)

=== Music videos ===
- "Popcorn"
- "Pure"
- "Hanging On"
- "Breakthrough"
- "Summer"
- "Can You Stop Me?"
- "Inhale"
- "Monument"
- "Safe Tonight"
- "Like A Movie"
- "Now You Are Mine"
- "To The End"
