= Inhale (disambiguation) =

Inhalation is the drawing in of a substance from the external environment into the lungs

Inhale may also refer to:

- Inhale (film), a 2010 American film
- "Inhale" (song), by Stone Sour
- Inhale (album), an album by Marsheaux
- "Inhale", a song by Killswitch Engage from The End of Heartache
