= E-Bay Queen Is Dead =

E-Bay Queen is Dead

Compilation album by Marsheaux
- Released: 29 April 2012
- Genre: Synthpop, electronica
- Label: Undo, Out of Line

Marsheaux chronology
Lumineux Noir (2009)	E-Bay Queen is Dead (2012)	Inhale (2013)

E-Bay Queen is Dead is a compilation album by the Greek synthpop duo Marsheaux. It was released on 29 April 2012 by Undo Records.

Band member Sophie Sarigiannidou describes the CD as a "compilation with unreleased material from our archives." The CD contains original unreleased work, as well as remixes of old Marsheaux tracks and cover versions of songs by Billy Idol, OMD, The Human League and New Order.

The CD's cover and title parodies that of The Smiths' 1986 album, The Queen is Dead. Half of the release featured Marianthi adopting a similar pose on the CD's cover, with Sophie appearing on the remainder.

== Track listing ==
=== Standard edition ===
No.	Title	Length
1.	"Bizarre Love Duo"	4:23
2.	"FischerPrice"	4:03
3.	"Now and Never"	4:09
4.	"Eyes Without a Face" (Written by Billy Idol and Steve Stevens)	4:46
5.	"Inside"	4:13
6.	"Do You Feel?"	4:40
7.	"Ghost/Hammer (Smash Up)"	5:00
8.	"Empire State Human" (Originally by The Human League, written by Philip Oakey, Martyn Ware and Ian Craig Marsh)	3:22
9.	"Sadly"	4:13
10.	"How Does It Feel?"	4:24
11.	"Regret (Version 2)" (Originally written and composed by New Order and Stephen Hague)	2:17
12.	"She's Leaving" (Originally written and composed by Orchestral Manoeuvres in the Dark)	3:58
13.	"Fly Away"	1:19
14.	"Cosmogirl"	0:27
