= E-Bay Queen =

Studio album by Marsheaux
- Released: June 30, 2004
- Recorded: 2004
- Genre: Synthpop, electronica
- Length: 53:46
- Label: Undo

Marsheaux chronology
E-Bay Queen (2004)	Peekaboo (2006)

Professional ratings
Review scores
Source	Rating
Side-Line	8/9 stars

E-Bay Queen is the debut studio album recorded in English by Greek female synthpop duo Marsheaux. It was released in Greece on 30 June 2004 by Undo Records.

E-Bay Queen is an Electronica album and is comparable in style to The Human League album Dare as it combines contrasting female vocals with early 1980s style analogue synthesizer tracks, and is also heavily influenced by the early works of OMD and Depeche Mode. It sold principally in Marsheaux's native Greece when first released but has since been revived by the international interest in Peekaboo and Undo Records are now marketing it towards an international audience.

The album contains two full cover versions, an Electronica version of The Lightning Seeds track "Pure" which is sung by Marianthi; and Marsheaux's dark version of Gershon Kingsley's instrumental track Popcorn which received considerable radio play on mainland Europe in 2003 when it was released as a single in advance of the album. In addition, the track "Όλα Γυρίζουν" (phonetic translation: "Ola Gyrizoun") is a partial cover of "October Love Song" by Chris & Cosey - it retains the music, but has new Greek lyrics written by Marsheaux.

== Track listing ==
All tracks are written by Marsheaux, except where noted.

No.	Title	Writer(s)	Length
1.	"M.A.R.S.H.E.A.U.X"	Marsheaux	3:16
2.	"Flash Lights"		3:44
3.	"Shake Me"		3:55
4.	"Pure" (Ian Broudie)		3:53
5.	"Play Boy"		4:45
6.	"Computer Love"		3:46
7.	"Tonight"		3:46
8.	"The Game"		3:39
9.	"Analyze"		3:39
10.	"Όλα Γυρίζουν [Ola Gyrizoun]" (Music by Chris Carter and Cosey Fanni Tutti, lyrics by Marsheaux)		3:47
11.	"Hands On Me"		3:28
12.	"Pop Corn" (Gershon Kingsley)		4:16
