= Human Help Network Foundation Thailand =

The Human Help Network Foundation Thailand (HHNFT) is an NGO that promotes sustainable human, social, and economic development. HHNFT aims to combat child exploitation and sex trafficking of minors as part of its broader mission to protect children throughout Thailand. Founded in 2008, Ratchada Chomjinda is currently the executive director. HHNFT provides support through its centers and outreach programs to children who have been trafficked or abused. This support includes immediate shelter, medical care, and counseling to help victims recover.

HHNFT operates the Mobile Training Unit, the Child Protection and Development Center, the Drop-In Center for Migrant Children and supports other projects. Members of HHNFT have received awards for their social work.

== Preventive measures and awareness ==
=== Centers ===
HHNFT operates two main centers: the Drop-In Center and the Child Protection and Development Center (CPDC). The Drop-In Center provides education, food, medical services, and a safe environment for migrant children, many from Cambodia and Myanmar, who are vulnerable to abuse and trafficking. In 2018, 465 children received help and services from the center. Meanwhile, the CPDC provides shelter, education, and therapeutic activities for children who have experienced physical and sexual abuse. It has the capacity to house 80-100 children and had approximately 70 children in its custody throughout 2018. Both centers aim to empower children, foster their development, and ultimately eliminate the need for such services by preventing child abuse in the community.

=== Mobile Training Unit ===
HHNFT's Mobile Training Unit plays a pivotal role in preventing child exploitation and sex trafficking by conducting educational campaigns in high-risk areas such as Walking Street, Pattaya. The unit educates communities about the signs of exploitation, the dangers of child prostitution, and the importance of reporting suspicious activities.

=== Advocacy and policy influence ===
Beyond direct intervention, HHNFT advocates for policy changes and legal reforms that enhance protections for children vulnerable to exploitation and trafficking. By engaging with policymakers and stakeholders, HHNFT works to create a more supportive and protective environment for all children in Thailand.

== Collaborative efforts ==
HHNFT collaborates with law enforcement agencies, government bodies, and other NGOs to strengthen efforts against child exploitation and trafficking. These partnerships facilitate coordinated responses to rescue victims, prosecute perpetrators, and implement policies that safeguard children's rights and well-being. Members of USS Miguel Keith have volunteered with HHNFT. They have partnered with the Lufthansa group and the German Embassy.

== See also ==
- Sex trafficking in Thailand
- Commercial sexual exploitation of children
- Child prostitution in Thailand
