= Ath.Lon =

Studio album by Marsheaux
- Released: 27 June 2016
- Genres: Synthpop, electronica
- Length: 45:49
- Label: Undo

Marsheaux chronology
A Broken Frame (2015)	Ath.Lon (2016)

Ath.Lon is the sixth studio album by Greek synthpop duo Marsheaux. After covering Depeche Mode's album A Broken Frame in 2015, Marsheaux released new original tracks on this album. The name Ath.Lon is a combination of Athens and London where the album was produced.

== Reception ==
Professional ratings
Review scores
Source	Rating
Release Magazine	8/10 stars
The Arts Desk	3/5 stars

The reviewer for Release Magazine lauded the production and found that the album contained influences of Chvrches and Ladytron. According to The Arts Desk, Ath.Lon was remiscent of Philip Glass and New Order but suffered from a "weedy" production. The Electricity Club noted "excellently layered sounds" with motorik beats similar to early Depeche Mode releases.

== Track listing ==
=== Standard edition ===
No.	Title	Length
1.	"Burning"	3:48
2.	"Like A Movie"	4:20
3.	"Sunday"	3:58
4.	"Wild Heart"	4:09
5.	"Now You Are Mine"	4:37
6.	"Strong Enough"	3:48
7.	"Safe Tonight"	3:45
8.	"Mediterranean"	4:10
9.	"Let's Take A Car"	4:06
10.	"The Beginning Of The End"	4:41
11.	"Butterflies"	4:27
