= Everything Counts =

1983 single by Depeche Mode

Single by Depeche Mode

from the album Construction Time Again
- B-side: "Work Hard"
- Released: 11 July 1983
- Recorded: 1983
- Studio: The Garden (London)
- Genre: Synth-pop; industrial pop; new wave
- Length: 3:58 (single version); 4:19 (album version); 7:18 (12″ version)
- Label: Mute
- Songwriter: Martin L. Gore
- Producers: Depeche Mode; Daniel Miller

Depeche Mode singles chronology
"Get the Balance Right!" (1983)	"Everything Counts" (1983)	"Love, in Itself" (1983)

Music video
- "Everything Counts" on YouTube

"Everything Counts" is a song by the English electronic band Depeche Mode, and served as the first single from their third studio album, Construction Time Again (1983). The track reached No. 6 on the UK singles chart.

A live version of the song was released as a single in 1989 to support the band's live album 101; this version reached No. 22 in the UK.

== Background and recording ==
The live version of "Everything Counts"

Depeche Mode had released their previous album, A Broken Frame in late 1982 and supported it with a world tour that lasted through April 1983, not counting a one-off live show in late May. During those last few months of the tour, in early 1983, the band started planning their follow-up album, and agreed to record their material at The Garden studios in East London, marking the first time they didn't record their music at Blackwing Studios. They entered the studio to record the new album in May/June of 1983, and "Everything Counts" was the first song released from those sessions, preceding the album Construction Time Again by one month. The song represented the first release of their new sound, a "more serious" sound that they wanted to achieve as they moved away from the tone of their earlier recordings. The band was still getting used to some of the equipment such as the Synclavier, and as such the opening "scraping" sound in the song came about by accident when they were using the sequencer. Alan Wilder said that the song quickly became an obvious choice to be their next single, with its good sound and lyrics.

As the mixing desk at The Garden was deemed unsuitable, (Note: Singer Dave Gahan stated later that The Garden's desk supported "only" 24 tracks and the band wanted more flexibility for their final mix.) the band chose to do final mixing for the album in West Berlin at Hansa Studios. They chose to go to Hansa for final mixing for a variety of reasons: it had the only 56-track mixing desk in the world at the time, which they felt they needed for their album; it was cheaper to work and live in West Berlin than in London; Hansa Studios had a "cult" reputation among bands since David Bowie had recorded there in the late 1970's; (Note: Bowie and Iggy Pop had recorded several albums at Hansa in 1976 and 1977, including Pop's Lust for Life and Bowie's Low and "Heroes") and the band wanted a change of environment, with Alan Wilder later saying "I think we were very excited because of the exotic atmosphere and Berlin's reputation – mostly artists and bohemian types. Apart from that, I'd heard that clubs and bars were open all night." The band went to Psalm East Studios in London to make multi-track safety copies of the track so they could go to West Berlin for mixing, and were pleased to find the tech assistant who helped make the copies was enthusiastic about the song. Said producer Daniel Miller, "You suddenly thought, maybe we've got more here than we think."

== Release and promotion ==
"Everything Counts" was the first single released from their studio album Construction Time Again, released in July 1983, a month before the album. In the UK, the single was released by Mute Records on 7" and 12" vinyl (catalogue numbers 7BONG3 and 12BONG3, respectively). A limited-edition release of the single designated L12BONG3, was released in the UK and Germany, and contained live tracks recorded in 1982 as the B-side. In Germany, Intercord records released the single on vinyl and as a cassingle (catalogue number INT 426.813), Sire Records released the single promotionally on 7" vinyl in Japan (catalogue P-1799), and RCA Records released the 7" promotionally in Spain (catalogue number SPBO-7439).

The B-side to the single, "Work Hard", called one of the more "experimental" Depeche Mode songs produced to date, was co-written by Martin Gore and Wilder. One of the rare songs co-written by the two, Wilder later said that "at one point I did try and persuade Martin [Gore] to co-write because I thought as a team we might be able to write some good songs together, but he completely blanked that idea. He wasn't into it at all."

"Everything Counts" reached number 6 on the UK charts upon its release as a single in July 1983.

=== Music videos ===
The music video for "Everything Counts" was directed by Clive Richardson in West Berlin. The band returned to Richardson after not being satisfied with the work of Julien Temple for the A Broken Frame singles; according to Wilder, "It was felt that after the Julien Temple years, we needed to harden up not only our sound but also our image. Clive had lots of new ideas which didn't involve stupid storyboards where we were required to act." Lead vocalist Dave Gahan later said "'Everything Counts' was the first of our videos with which we were truly happy. The early ones were not representative of us at all. When any of the early films show up on TV, as they do occasionally, we get a bit embarrassed."

The music video was made available on later video compilations, including Some Great Videos (1985), the DVD of The Best of Depeche Mode Volume 1 (2006) and Video Singles Collection (2016).

== Critical reception ==
Upon its release, Billboard said that there was "a very hard edge to this song, with its dark, cynical lyrics and darker, dissonant synthesizer riffs." In 2017, Billboard included "Everything Counts" on their list of Top 20 Depeche Mode songs, coming in at number 5.

Ned Raggett of AllMusic said that "Depeche's proto-industrial/dance/breakbeat anthem still cuts right to the quick, a note-perfect combination of electronic innovation," and complimented Gahan's "increasing abilities with a fuller singing voice."

Jason Heller of The A.V. Club described the song as "a clouded pop gem that dissolves from crystalline, sophisticated synthesizer patterns into lullaby-level singsong." He also praised the vocals, calling them "a hard/soft vocal dynamic that plays up the strengths of each and underscores the sensitive-cyborg vibe that pulses through the song."

== Other appearances ==
The studio version or remixes of "Everything Counts" were included on several later Depeche Mode compilation albums, including People Are People (1984), The Singles 81→85 (1985), Greatest Hits (1986), Remixes 81–04 (2004), The Best of Depeche Mode Volume 1 (2006), and Remixes 2: 81–11 (2011).

"Everything Counts" as a live concert track appeared on The World We Live In and Live in Hamburg (1984), 101 (1988), Devotional (1993), and Touring the Angel: Live in Milan (2006). The 101 version of the song was released as a single in 1989.

== Track listings ==
=== 1983 release ===
7": Mute / 7Bong3 (UK) & Sire / 7-29482 (US)

1. "Everything Counts" – 3:58
2. "Work Hard" – 4:21

12": Mute / 12Bong3 (UK) & Sire / 0-20165 (US)

1. "Everything Counts" (In Larger Amounts) – 7:18
2. "Work Hard" (East End remix) – 6:57

12": Mute / L12Bong3 (UK)

1. "Everything Counts" (7″ version) – 3:58
2. "New Life" (live) – 4:12
3. "Boys Say Go!" (live) – 2:36
4. "Nothing to Fear" (live) – 4:28
5. "The Meaning of Love" (live) – 3:14

CD (1991): Mute / CDBong3 (UK)

1. "Everything Counts" – 3:58
2. "Work Hard" – 4:21
3. "Everything Counts" (In Larger Amounts) – 7:18
4. "Work Hard" (East End remix) – 6:57

Notes and personnel

- "Everything Counts", "Nothing to Fear", and "The Meaning of Love" written by Martin Gore.
- "Work Hard" written by Martin Gore and Alan Wilder.
- "New Life" and "Boys Say Go!" written by Vince Clarke.
- Live tracks recorded 25 October 1982 at Hammersmith Odeon in London.

== 1989 live release ==
"Everything Counts" (live)

Single by Depeche Mode

from the album 101
- B-side: "Nothing" (live)
- Released: 13 February 1989
- Recorded: 18 June 1988
- Venue: Rose Bowl (Pasadena, California)
- Genre: Synth-pop; new wave
- Length: 6:45 (7″ full version); 6:30 (album version); 5:46 (single version)
- Label: Mute
- Songwriter: Martin L. Gore
- Producer: Depeche Mode

Depeche Mode singles chronology
"Little 15" (1988)	"Everything Counts" (live) (1989)	"Personal Jesus" (1989)

Music video
- "Everything Counts" (live) on YouTube

A live version of "Everything Counts" from Depeche Mode's Music for the Masses Tour was released as a single in March 1989 to promote the live album 101. It was released by Mute Records in the UK, Intercord Records in Germany and Virgin Records as a promo in France.

=== Track listings ===
7″: Mute / Bong16 (UK)

1. "Everything Counts" (live full version) – 6:45
2. "Nothing" (live) – 4:35

12″/CD: Mute / 12Bong16 / CDBong16 (UK)

1. "Everything Counts" (live single version) – 5:46
2. "Nothing" (live) – 4:40
3. "Sacred" (live) – 5:12
4. "A Question of Lust" (live) – 4:12

Limited 12″/CD: Mute / L12Bong16 / LCDBong16 (UK)

1. "Everything Counts" (remixed by Tim Simenon & Mark Saunders) – 5:32
2. "Nothing" (remixed by Justin Strauss) – 7:01
3. "Strangelove" (remixed by Tim Simenon & Mark Saunders) – 6:33
- These remixes do not have any titles on the UK releases, but are often
  known as the "Bomb the Bass", "Zip Hop" and "Highjack" mixes, respectively.

10″: Mute / 10Bong16 (UK)

1. "Everything Counts" (Absolut mix) – 6:04
2. "Everything Counts" (In Larger Amounts) – 7:18
3. "Nothing" (US 7″ mix) – 3:57
4. "Everything Counts" (reprise) – 0:55
- Track 3 is usually known as "Nothing" (remix edit) in the US.

CD (2004): Mute / CDBong16X (UK)

1. "Everything Counts" (live single version) – 5:46
2. "Nothing" (live) – 4:35
3. "Sacred" (live) – 5:12
4. "A Question of Lust" (live) – 4:12
5. "Everything Counts" (Tim Simenon/Mark Saunders remix) – 5:32
6. "Nothing" (Justin Strauss remix) – 7:01
7. "Strangelove" (Tim Simenon/Mark Saunders remix) – 6:33
8. "Everything Counts" (Absolut mix) – 6:04
9. "Everything Counts" (12″ version) – 7:21
10. "Nothing" (US 7″ mix) – 3:57
11. "Everything Counts" (reprise) – 0:55

7″: Sire / 7-22993 (US)

1. "Everything Counts" (live radio edit) – 4:50
2. "Nothing" (Live) – 4:35

12″: Sire / 0-21183 (US)

1. "Everything Counts" (Tim Simenon/Mark Saunders remix) – 5:32
2. "Everything Counts" (live single version) – 5:45
3. "Nothing" (live) – 4:35
4. "Everything Counts" (Absolut mix) – 6:04
5. "Sacred" (live) – 5:12
6. "A Question of Lust" (live) – 4:12

Cassette: Sire / 4-22993 (US)

1. "Everything Counts" (live radio edit) – 4:50
2. "Nothing" (live) – 4:35

Notes and personnel

- All songs written by Martin Gore.
- Live tracks recorded at the Pasadena Rose Bowl on 18 June 1988.
- Tim Simenon and Mark Saunders' remix of "Everything Counts" (The "Bomb the Bass Mix") was remixed at Konk Studio, London.
- Justin Strauss' remixes of "Nothing" (The "Zip Hop Mix" and "Remix Edit") were remixed at Soundtracks Studio, New York City.
- Tim Simenon and Mark Saunders' remix of "Strangelove" (The "Highjack Mix") was remixed at Livingston Studios, London.
- "Everything Counts (Absolut Mix)" was remixed at Trident Studio, London, by Alan Moulder.

== Charts ==
=== Weekly charts ===
Weekly chart performance for "Everything Counts"
Chart (1983–1984)	Peak position
Ireland (IRMA)	15
Italy (Musica e dischi)	17
Netherlands (Dutch Top 40 Tipparade)	10
Netherlands (Single Top 100)	50
Sweden (Sverigetopplistan)	18
Switzerland (Schweizer Hitparade)	8
UK Singles (Official Charts)	6
US Dance Club Songs (Billboard)	17
West Germany (GfK)	23

Weekly chart performance for "Everything Counts" (1989 live version)
Chart (1989)	Peak position
Austria (Ö3 Austria Top 40)	26
Europe (Eurochart Hot 100 Singles)	25
Ireland (IRMA)	17
Netherlands (Single Top 100)	89
New Zealand (Recorded Music NZ)	27
Spain (AFYVE)	20
Switzerland (Schweizer Hitparade)	18
UK Singles (Official Charts)	22
UK Indie (OCC)	3
US Alternative Airplay (Billboard)	13
US Dance Club Songs (Billboard)	16
US Dance Singles Sales (Billboard)	18
West Germany (GfK)	12

=== Year-end charts ===
Year-end chart performance for "Everything Counts" (1989 live version)
Chart (1989)	Position
West Germany (Media Control)	89
