= Peekaboo (Marsheaux album) =

Studio album by Marsheaux
- Released: December 2006
- Recorded: 2006
- Genre: Synthpop, electropop
- Length: 51:46
- Label: Undo Records

Marsheaux chronology
E-Bay Queen (2004)	Peekaboo (2006)	Lumineux Noir (2009)

Professional ratings
Review scores
Source	Rating
ElectronicallyYours	9/10 stars
Metal.de	9/10 stars
Side-Line	7/8 stars

Peekaboo is the second studio album of the synthpop duo Marsheaux. It was issued in 2006 by Undo Records.

Upon its release in Marsheaux's native Greece in December 2006, it earned positive reviews from music critics. The album was formally released in the UK on 9 April 2007. It has also sold well internationally on the internet, principally in the UK and USA.

Peekaboo is heavily influenced by the early analogue synthesizer works of Depeche Mode and The Human League. It contains two covers, "Regret" by New Order and "The Promise" by When in Rome. All vocals are in English.

== Reception ==
The album has received favourable ratings from critics. The Side-Line magazine called it "pure synth-pop music with strong references to the 80s" comparing it to the music of Ladytron. A review by the German Metal.de webzine noted creative songwriting with surprising moments and also ElectronicallyYours lauded the album's originality. The Sonic Seducer noted the "respectfully modernised" version of New Order's "Regret", and wrote that according to their style both Peekaboo and Marsheaux's debut album E-Bay Queen could well have been released 25 years earlier.

The album sleeve designed by MNP won the second place at the 2008 European Design Awards.

== Track listing ==
All tracks are written by Marsheaux except "The Promise" by When in Rome and "Regret" by New Order.

No.	Title	Length
1.	"Hanging On"	4:06
2.	"Wait No More"	4:18
3.	"No Sence"	3:52
4.	"The Promise" (Written and composed by When In Rome)	3:49
5.	"City of Lights"	3:49
6.	"Dream of a Disco"	4:00
7.	"What a Lovely Surprise"	3:46
8.	"Home"	3:46
9.	"What You Don't Like"	3:40
10.	"Love Under Pressure"	4:05
11.	"People's Mind"	3:52
12.	"Regret" (Written and composed by New Order)	3:56
13.	"Heaven"	3:47
