= Inhale (album) =

Studio album by Marsheaux
- Released: 15 April 2013
- Genres: Synth-pop, electronica
- Length: 49:39
- Label: Undo

Marsheaux chronology
E-Bay Queen is Dead (2012)	Inhale (2013)	A Broken Frame (2015)

Inhale is the fourth studio album of the Greek synthpop duo Marsheaux. It features 1980s-style synthpop.

== Reception ==
Professional ratings
Review scores
Source	Rating
Release Magazine	8/10 stars

The Sonic Seducer's reviewer noted, that Inhale had probably surpassed the musical quality of Marsheaux's long-term role model The Human League. According to the Release Magazine, the album is Marsheaux's "most advanced effort" but was still deemed slightly weaker than the previous release Lumineux Noir.

== Track listing ==
=== Standard edition ===
No.	Title	Length
1.	"Self Control"	4:01
2.	"Secret Place"	3:52
3.	"Inhale"	3:43
4.	"To the End"	4:47
5.	"Come on Now"	3:58
6.	"Alone"	4:21
7.	"Never Stop"	4:21
8.	"August Day"	5:00
9.	"Over & Over"	4:05
10.	"End is a New Start"	3:57
11.	"Can You Stop Me (Extendead)"	7:34

In addition, there was a limited edition bonus CD, containing remixes of Inhale, Can You Stop Me, and August Day, as well as remixes of the track "So Far," from their earlier CD, Lumineux Noir.
