= Get the Balance Right! =

Single by Depeche Mode
- B-side: "The Great Outdoors!"
- Released: 31 January 1983
- Recorded: November 1982
- Studio: Blackwing (London)
- Genre: Synth-pop
- Length: 3:12 (7″/single version); 7:56 (12″ version)
- Label: Mute
- Songwriter: Martin L. Gore
- Producers: Depeche Mode; Daniel Miller

Depeche Mode singles chronology
"Leave in Silence" (1982)	"Get the Balance Right!" (1983)	"Everything Counts" (1983)

Music video
- "Get the Balance Right!" on YouTube

"Get the Balance Right!" is the seventh single by the English electronic band Depeche Mode, released on 31 January 1983. Recorded at Blackwing Studios in November 1982, it is the first Depeche Mode single with Alan Wilder as an official band member; Wilder also co-wrote the B-side track "The Great Outdoors!" with Martin Gore.

== Background and recording ==
Depeche Mode had released their previous album A Broken Frame in September 1982 and had followed up with a tour which started in October of that year. During the UK leg of the tour, in November 1982, the band went into the studio to record a new song, and for the first time included newly-inducted band-member Alan Wilder in the recording process. According to authors Dennis Burmeister and Sascha Lange in their Monument chronology, "Get the Balance Right!" represented a "beefier" musical sound that was a departure from the lighter sound of A Broken Frame, despite only being a few months removed from that album's release. "Get the Balance Right!" is one of the first Depeche Mode songs to feature guitar; according to Andy Fletcher, the guitar was processed through a synth and phased out of time to make it sound more interesting. One of the tools used to record the song was an ARP 2600 synthesiser. In addition, it was the first Depeche Mode single to be recorded using the relatively new Synclavier synthesizer, brought into the studio by Wilder and producer Daniel Miller. The band struggled to assemble, learn and use the new device, and as a result grew to resent the recording and production of the song. Songwriter Martin Gore later said of the song, "it was hell to record. I hate it, and I wrote it." Despite the Synclavier's unwieldiness, Wilder admitted that it sounded good, and gave the band a useful new tool for recording.

With the release of "Get the Balance Right!", the band started to take remixes seriously, with Wilder calling it "the beginning of when everybody realized you had to make a 12-inch mix to help sell your single". For the "Balance" 12-inch remix, Wilder remembered "chopping up the tape. Just literally running off parses from the track. From the mixing board, on the tape, then chopping the tape up. I remember spending hours and hours chopping up tapes to put them together." He elaborated that

[The single "Get the Balance Right!"] was the first time we had concentrated on producing a dance 12". Although remixes had been made for previous [singles], this one was very much geared towards the clubs. At that time, Mode tracks were always recorded with the LP version in mind. From there, we would either edit down for a 7" version or expand for a 12". To make a 12" involved running off differently mixed sections [of a song] onto two-track tape until we had enough pieces to edit the new version together. The tape editing process was much more limiting and took longer than current digital methods. The mere fact that it was much harder to work to create a totally different and new version of a song probably contributed to the style of those early mixes and accounts for a lot of their charm.

The B-side is "The Great Outdoors!", an instrumental written by Gore and Wilder. Wilder later said that "The Great Outdoors" was the only track he co-wrote with the band that "Martin [Gore] and I actually sat down and knocked together in the studio. It was all done very quickly."

== Release ==
"Get the Balance Right!" was released at the end of January 1983 on both 7" and 12" singles by Mute records in the UK, with catalogue numbers 7BONG2 and 12BONG2, respectively. In Germany, label Intercord released the single on 7" and 12" red vinyl as well as the first "cassingle" release for a Depeche Mode song (catalogue number 426.810). Also for the first time for a Depeche Mode single, there was a 'limited edition' single release (UK catalogue number L12BONG2), with the b-side containing live tracks from their 25 October 1982 show. The cover art was notable for being a departure from their previous singles' style and the hammer became a form of iconography that continued in the band's albums and singles artwork for the next few years. Despite the visual continuity, "Get the Balance Right!" was not included on Depeche Mode's following album, Construction Time Again (1983), because the band felt that there was little in common with the songs and sound of their newer material. The 7" version was later released on the American compilation People Are People (1984), the UK compilation The Singles 81→85 (1985), and the 12" was included on the remix compilation album Remixes 81–04 (2004).

A white label promotional copy of "Get the Balance Right!" found its way to influential Detroit DJ Derrick May, who put the song on rotation and helped Depeche Mode begin to get a foothold in the underground club scene in the US. DJ Kevin Saunderson, who played the single at clubs in Detroit and would later remix several Depeche Mode tracks, called the song "the first house record."

=== Reception ===
Reaction to the single in the press was mixed; John Gill of Time Out magazine said in his review, "I often wonder why God bothered with Depeche Mode", but Johnny Waller's review in Sounds magazine was more positive, noting that "Depeche seem to have fallen from grace with the critical cognoscenti, but this is the sort of single they do better than anyone else." The single reached a high of number 13 on the UK single charts in February 1983.

== Music video ==
In the music video, keyboardist Wilder lip-syncs the first lines of the song, even though Dave Gahan is the lead singer; video director Kevin Hewitt made the assumption that Wilder was the singer and the band was too embarrassed to point out his mistake. The video went unreleased for many years, due to the band's dislike of it, until it was included on the band's Video Singles Collection (2016).

== Track listings ==
All songs are written by Martin L. Gore, except "The Great Outdoors!", written by Gore and Alan Wilder.

=== 7″ vinyl single ===
UK: Mute / 7Bong2

Side one
No.	Title	Length
1.	"Get the Balance Right!"	3:12

Side two
No.	Title	Length
1.	"The Great Outdoors!"	5:01

=== 12″ vinyl single ===
UK: Mute / 12Bong2

Side one
No.	Title	Length
1.	"Get the Balance Right!" (Combination mix)	7:56

Side two
No.	Title	Length
1.	"The Great Outdoors!"	5:01
2.	"Tora! Tora! Tora!" (live, recorded 25 October 1982 at Hammersmith Odeon in London)	4:00

UK: Mute / L12Bong2 (Limited edition)

Side one
No.	Title	Length
1.	"Get the Balance Right!"	3:12

Side two
No.	Title	Length
1.	"My Secret Garden" (live, recorded 25 October 1982 at Hammersmith Odeon in London)	7:28
2.	"See You" (live, recorded 25 October 1982 at Hammersmith Odeon in London)	4:11
3.	"Satellite" (live, recorded 25 October 1982 at Hammersmith Odeon in London)	4:28
4.	"Tora! Tora! Tora!" (live, recorded 25 October 1982 at Hammersmith Odeon in London)	4:00

US: Sire / 0-29704
Released 7 September 1983. The first two tracks on side two are listed as one track on the sleeve, when they are actually two separate tracks.

Side one
No.	Title	Length
1.	"Get the Balance Right!" (Combination mix)	7:56

Side two
No.	Title	Length
1.	"The Great Outdoors!"	5:01
2.	"Tora! Tora! Tora!" (live, recorded 25 October 1982 at Hammersmith Odeon in London)	4:00
3.	"Get the Balance Right!" (edited mix [same as the original version])	3:12

=== CD single ===
UK: Mute / CDBong2
Released 25 November 1991, from the Singles Box Set #2.
US: Sire/Reprise 40295-2
Released 26 November 1991, from the Singles Box Set #2.
US: Reprise CD BONG 2 (R2 78890A)
Released 30 March 2004, from the Singles Box Set #1 reissue.

No.	Title	Length
1.	"Get the Balance Right!"	3:12
2.	"The Great Outdoors!"	5:01
3.	"Get the Balance Right!" (Combination mix)	7:56
4.	"Tora! Tora! Tora!" (live, recorded 25 October 1982 at Hammersmith Odeon in London)	4:00

== Charts ==
Chart performance for "Get the Balance Right!"
Chart (1983)	Peak position
Ireland (IRMA)	16
UK Singles (Official Charts)	13
UK Indie (OCC)	1
US Dance Club Songs (Billboard)	31
West Germany (GfK)	38
