= Lumineux Noir =

Studio album by Marsheaux
- Released: 19 July 2009
- Recorded: Studio "Spacelab" (October 2008 - January 2009)
- Genre: Synthpop, electronica
- Length: 51:46
- Label: Undo, Out of Line

Marsheaux chronology
Peekaboo (2006)	Lumineux Noir (2009)	E-Bay Queen is Dead (2012)

Lumineux Noir is the third studio album of the Greek synthpop duo Marsheaux. It was released on 19 July 2009 by Undo Records. According to the Side-Line magazine, it did not "bring an evolution in sound, but shows a growing maturity in song writing and production". It is reminiscent of 1980s synthpop with tracks that have been compared to Ladytron, Chemical Brothers and Client.

== Reception ==
Professional ratings
Review scores
Source	Rating
ElectronicallyYours	9.5/10 stars
Side-Line	8/9 stars
Sonic Seducer	(favourable)

Professional reviews compared the style to 1980s synthpop and contemporary acts. The Side-Line magazine wrote that Lumineux Noir showed "a growing maturity in song writing and production" and that the track "Sorrow" was reminiscent of And One. According to the Sonic Seducer, the album was approaching the style of Client and Ladytron while offering more different moods than Marsheaux's previous releases.

== Track listing ==
=== Standard edition ===
No.	Title	Length
1.	"Exit"	4:06
2.	"Breakthrough"	4:07
3.	"Summer"	3:58
4.	"Stand By"	4:19
5.	"Radial Emotion"	4:02
6.	"Loss Of Heaven"	4:23
7.	"Destroy Me"	4:32
8.	"Faith"	4:05
9.	"Ghosts"	4:13
10.	"It's Fine Now"	4:49
11.	"Thousand LEDs"	4:14
12.	"So Far"	4:33
13.	"Sorrow"	4:17

=== Limited edition ===
CD 1
No.	Title	Length
1.	"Exit"	4:06
2.	"Breakthrough"	4:07
3.	"Summer"	3:58
4.	"Stand By"	4:19
5.	"Radial Emotion"	4:02
6.	"Loss Of Heaven"	4:23
7.	"Destroy Me"	4:32
8.	"Faith"	4:05
9.	"Ghosts"	4:13
10.	"It's Fine Now"	4:49
11.	"Thousand LEDs"	4:14
12.	"So Far"	4:33
13.	"Sorrow"	4:17

CD 2
No.	Title	Length
1.	"Breakthrough - Radio Edit"	3:42
2.	"Breakthrough - Fotonovela Remix"	6:47
3.	"How Does It Feel?"	4:26
4.	"Breakthrough - Auto Auto Remix"	3:58
5.	"Breakthrough - Marsheauxxxx Remixxxx"	4:31
6.	"Summer (Radio Edit)"	3:47
7.	"Summer (August 15th Remix)"	6:00

This double disc was only produced with a limitation of 1,000 copies, and only available via the Out Of Line music label.
