= Love, in Itself =

Single by Depeche Mode

from the album Construction Time Again
- B-side: "Fools"
- Released: 19 September 1983
- Recorded: 1983
- Studio: The Garden (London)
- Genre: Synth-pop
- Length: 4:00 (single version); 4:19 (original 7″ version); 4:29 (album version); 7:18 (12″ version)
- Label: Mute
- Songwriter: Martin L. Gore
- Producers: Depeche Mode; Daniel Miller

Depeche Mode singles chronology
"Everything Counts" (1983)	"Love, in Itself" (1983)	"People Are People" (1984)

Music video
- "Love, in Itself" on YouTube

"Love, in Itself" (occasionally referred to as "Love in Itself") is a song by the English electronic band Depeche Mode, released on 19 September 1983 as the second and final single from their third studio album, Construction Time Again (1983). The song peaked at number 21 on the UK singles chart.

== Background and recording ==
"Love, in Itself" was recorded at The Garden in East London as part of the Construction Time Again recording sessions in the first half of 1983 and was mixed with the rest of the album at Hansa Studios in West Berlin. Songwriter Martin Gore thought it was a strange choice for a single, saying "I don't think it was a great choice as a pop hit. It's quite slow, it's quite odd".

== Release and promotion ==
Construction Time Again was released in August 1983, "Love, in Itself" was released on 19 September 1983, and the band supported both with their Construction Time Again Tour from September through December of that year.

In the UK, Mute Records released the single on 7", 12" and limited 12" singles with catalogue numbers 7BONG4, 12BONG4, and L12BONG4, respectively. In Germany, Intercord Records released the album promotionally on a red vinyl 7" single (catalogue number INT 111.814), and as a cassingle with catalogue number INT 426.816; the "Love, in Itself" single was the last Depeche Mode single to receive a cassingle release in Germany on the Intercord label.

The cover artwork was designed by Martyn Atkins and cover photos were taken by Brian Griffin. The 12" release had on its B-side a guitar-heavy bossa nova version of the single, officially named "Love, in Itself • 4" but given the working name "Cocktail" on the master tapes. The B-side to the 7" and 12" singles were versions of the non-album track "Fools", and on the limited 12" release were live tracks recorded during their 1982 A Broken Frame Tour. The limited 12" single had unique album artwork.

The single reached number 21 on the UK singles chart.

"Love, in Itself" appeared on later compilation albums such as People Are People (1985), The Singles 81→85 (1985), and Catching Up with Depeche Mode (1985).

== Music video ==
The video for "Love, in Itself" was directed by Clive Richardson. The music video was later released on Some Great Videos (1985) and Video Singles Collection (2016).

== Formats and track listings ==
7" / 7BONG4 (UK)

1. "Love, in Itself • 2" – 4:00
2. "Fools" – 4:14

12" / 12BONG4 (UK)

1. "Love, in Itself • 3" – 7:18
2. "Fools" (Bigger) – 7:39
3. "Love, in Itself • 4" – 4:38

12" / L12BONG4 (UK)

1. "Love, in Itself • 2" (original 7 inch mix) – 4:18
2. "Just Can't Get Enough" (live) – 5:35
3. "A Photograph of You" (live) – 3:21
4. "Shout!" (live) – 4:39
5. "Photographic" (live) – 3:56

CD / CDBONG4 (UK)

1. "Love, in Itself • 2" – 4:00
2. "Fools" – 4:14
3. "Love, in Itself • 3" – 7:18
4. "Fools" (Bigger) – 7:39
5. "Love, in Itself • 4" – 4:38

== Charts ==
Chart performance for "Love, in Itself"
Chart (1983–1985)	Peak position
Ireland (IRMA)	27
Netherlands (Dutch Top 40)	5
UK Singles (Official Charts)	21
UK Indie (OCC)	3
West Germany (GfK)	28
