= The Meaning of Love =

1982 single by Depeche Mode

Single by Depeche Mode

from the album A Broken Frame
- B-side: "Oberkorn (It's a Small Town)"
- Released: 26 April 1982
- Recorded: March 1982
- Studio: Blackwing (London)
- Genre: Synth-pop
- Length: 3:05 (album/7″ single version); 4:59 (12″ version)
- Label: Mute
- Songwriter: Martin Gore
- Producers: Daniel Miller; Depeche Mode

Depeche Mode singles chronology
"See You" (1982)	"The Meaning of Love" (1982)	"Leave in Silence" (1982)

Music video
- "The Meaning of Love" on YouTube

Professional ratings
Review scores
Source	Rating
AllMusic	3/5 stars

"The Meaning of Love" is a song by English electronic music band Depeche Mode from their second studio album, A Broken Frame (1982). It was released on 26 April 1982 as the album's second single, and the band's fifth overall. Released in the UK, Germany and promotionally in Spain, it reached number 12 on the UK Singles Chart.

== Background and release ==
"The Meaning of Love" is a song Martin Gore had written originally as a teenager, and was re-arranged and recorded by Depeche Mode in early 1982 as a follow-up to their successful album Speak & Spell (1981). Released only in Europe on 26 April 1982, it subsequently reached number 12 on the UK singles chart, making the song the band's fourth straight to reach the UK top 20. In the UK, the single was released by Mute records on 7" and 12" vinyl with catalogue numbers 7MUTE022 and 12MUTE022, respectively, and in Germany, Intercord records released the 7" with catalogue number INT 111.804. Early German pressings were released on red vinyl, and later issues used standard black vinyl. RCA Records released the single promotionally in Spain on 7" vinyl, catalogue number SPBO-7333. Like for their previous single "See You", East German painter Moritz Reichelt was commissioned by the band and Mute label to create the single's artwork.

The B-side, "Oberkorn (It's a Small Town)", is an instrumental written by Gore and used as the intro music for the A Broken Frame Tour, and named for the town of Oberkorn, Luxembourg.

"The Meaning of Love" appeared on later Depeche Mode compilation albums including The Singles 81→85 (1985, CD version only) and Catching Up with Depeche Mode (1985).

== Music video ==
Julien Temple, who had directed the band's previous two videos, also directed the video for "The Meaning of Love." The video was the second video to feature Alan Wilder, although he did not contribute to the song. In retrospect, the band didn't like the video, and as a result it was not included on later video compilations such as Some Great Videos. Fletcher admitted that they were struggling with their image at the time, "torn between being a pop band ... and a cooler alternative band." Retrospective publications later called the videos from this time period "worst case, embarrassing, and at best a documentation of these innocent times."

== Track listing ==
All tracks written by Martin L. Gore

7″: Mute / 7Mute22 (UK)

1. "The Meaning of Love" – 3:05
2. "Oberkorn (It's a Small Town)" – 4:07

12″: Mute / 12Mute22 (UK)

1. "The Meaning of Love" (Fairly Odd mix) – 4:59
2. "Oberkorn (It's a Small Town)" (Development mix) – 7:37

CD: Mute / CDMute22 (UK) – released in 1991

1. "The Meaning of Love" – 3:05
2. "Oberkorn (It's a Small Town)" – 4:07
3. "The Meaning of Love" (Fairly Odd mix) – 4:59
4. "Oberkorn (It's a Small Town)" (Development mix) – 7:37

CD: Sire / 40293-2 (US) – released in 1991

1. "The Meaning of Love" – 3:05
2. "Oberkorn (It's a Small Town)" – 4:07
3. "The Meaning of Love" (Fairly Odd mix) – 4:59
4. "Oberkorn (It's a Small Town)" (Development mix) – 7:37

== Charts ==
Weekly chart performance for "The Meaning of Love"
Chart (1982)	Peak position
Ireland (IRMA)	17
Sweden (Sverigetopplistan)	16
UK Singles (OCC)	12
UK Indie (MRIB)	2
West Germany (GfK)	64

Chart (2002)	Peak position
Hungary (Single Top 40)	17
