= Child prostitution in Thailand =

Prostitution involving a child in Thailand

Thailand is a centre for child sex tourism and child prostitution. Even though domestic and international authorities work to protect children from sexual abuse, the problem still persists in Thailand and many other Southeast Asian countries. Child prostitution, like other forms of child sexual abuse, not only causes death and high morbidity rates in millions of children but also violates their rights and dignity.

== History ==
Sexual exploitation of children and women in Thailand dates back many centuries. During the Ayutthaya period from 1351 to 1767, women were circulated amongst men as concubines or treated as spoils of war given to soldiers as rewards. Children and women used as sex slaves had to obey their masters or face punishment.

Sexual slavery continued in Thailand for hundreds of years until the 20th century when King Rama V sought a more Western approach in his policy and abolished slavery. The abolition of slavery left many without any means of subsistence, forcing them to turn to prostitution.

Prostitution was more active during times of war. During World War II, under the occupation of Japan, Japanese forces used Thai women as prostitutes. During the Vietnam War, Thailand was a popular destination for American soldiers on their R&R leave. Although the soldiers preferred women rather than young girls, the sex industry in Thailand developed faster than ever before. There were five US bases in Thailand, each housing up to 50,000 troops. Kathryn Farr makes clear that the correlation between the number of troops in Vietnam and the number of prostitutes in Thailand is of significance. "In 1957, an estimated 20,000 prostitutes were working in Thailand. By 1964, that number rose to 400,000. By 1972, when the United States withdrew its main combat troops from Vietnam, there were at least 500,000 working prostitutes in the country. From then on, the Thai sex industry simply exploded".

Since the 1970s, sex tourism in Thailand has been increasing. In 1973, an estimated 1 million sex tourists were in Thailand which rose to 2 million in 1981. The Thailand government spent millions of baht to promote tourism in Thailand in the 1980s and in 1988 the number of sex tourists has risen to 4 million. In the 1990s, sex tourists were staying longer in Thailand than before, which made sex tourism the highest source of foreign currency revenue in Thailand. More than 7.5 million sex tourists visited Thailand by 1998.

== Contributing factors ==
=== Economic disparity ===
In the early-1990s, Thailand became one of several Southeast Asian countries to join the ranks of the NICs, or "newly industrialising countries." The country shifted from a rice-based agricultural society to one of rapid industrialisation, and Thailand's GDP doubled in the following decade.

Some provinces, such as Isan, however, struggled to keep up with the industrialisation of neighbouring provinces. The costs of food, land, and tools all increased as the economy grew, but the returns for rice production and other agricultural practices remained stagnant. The country currently experiences massive wealth inequality, labelled the Gini coefficient, in which the country sees rapid growth in wealthy areas but no growth or even a decline in other areas.

Many families are forced to find other methods of income if their land isn't fit for agriculture in addition to the growing social pressure to keep up with industrialised Thailand. As Bales writes, "Now parents feel a great pressure to buy consumer goods that were unknown even twenty years ago." Traffickers exploit this vulnerability by convincing these families to sell their daughters for money. The daughters are promised stable employment in the city, which could alleviate the families' financial difficulties, and the contracts are often seemingly appealing but false. Moreover, in certain parts of Thailand, parents rely on their children to provide money for the family as they suffer from poverty and cannot earn enough money otherwise. The popular belief in Thailand is that children have the responsibility to provide for the family as a way of repaying parents for giving them a place to live. In turn, due to a lack of self-sustaining jobs nearby, children are sometimes forced into exploitation as sex slaves for money or turn to prostitution, which is highly profitable. Other people have taken advantage of this, especially those from western countries. In addition to economic factors, the ingrained attitude of female commodification in Thai society is a major reason driving children to be sold into the sex trade.

Not only are children forced into prostitution, but they have minimal incentives to run away. Providing support for the family by any means is widely considered a good deed in the country. This teaching is embedded in their religion, Theravada Buddhism, so it is difficult for some children to leave the sex trade because many parts of the country are accepting of it. Even men in these areas often mention that they aren't bothered by their spouse being a former sex slave because it has made them rich. The chances of marriage aren't reduced for these children, rendering disapproval uncommon.

=== Abduction of children ===
In some circumstances, children who live in Thailand run away or are abducted from their homes. Vulnerable children are often taken by sex trafficking pimps and then sold to individuals or brothels in Thailand. Traffickers can also sell children to individuals who travel to Thailand for child prostitution and will allow the child to leave the country with the individual who purchased them. According to the United Nations, children are kidnapped from Myanmar, Cambodia, Vietnam, and Laos to be trafficked to Thailand, where they find a better client base.

== Individual risk factors ==
Both girls and boys, as young as ten years old, are prostituted throughout Thailand. Most of these children are exploited by local men in their communities, and others are also prostituted by pedophiles and foreign sex tourists. Some of these children may have five to ten clients per day. Children who are homeless, runaways, or abandoned are the most likely to be forced into prostitution and are actively recruited by pimps and traffickers.

Prostituted children are at a high risk of catching many infectious diseases and sequelae, and they are at higher risk of contracting HIV. According to a study, it has been found that 17% of brothels in Thailand contain individuals and child prostitutes infected with HIV. In addition, prostituted children who have an STD that causes genital ulcers such as syphilis or chancroid are four times more likely to develop an HIV infection. Lack of medical services for children with STDs can increase this risk since they will remain untreated or will self-medicate. Prostituted children who are infected with HIV have a very high risk of developing active tuberculosis.

These diseases can be passed to both their children as well as their clients. The ESCAP study found that STD rates are highest in Cambodia (36%), China (78%), and Thailand (38%). Prostituted girls are also likely to have cervical cancer. Developing cervical cancer is associated with having multiple sexual partners or having sexual intercourse at an early age. Those who have a diagnosis are often unaware until a late stage, making successful treatment unlikely.

Sexually-active adolescents who do not use contraception have a 90% chance of becoming pregnant each year; thus, since many girls in Thailand do not have access to contraceptives, they become pregnant. These girls are also at high risk of pregnancy-related complications, including death. Moreover, many impregnated prostituted children seek abortions, and unsafe abortions place them at a higher risk of injury or death.

Prostituted children in Thailand are likely to have serious, long-term mental health issues such as anxiety, depression, and behavioral disorders. Many prostituted children often feel helpless, damaged, degraded, betrayed, and shameful, and they tend to be at high risk of suicide and post-traumatic stress disorder.

Prostituted children may also sustain injuries, including rape, as a result of violence from pimps, clients, police, and intimate partners. Girls who are forced into prostitution may be physically and emotionally abused into submission. These youths are also beaten to induce miscarriages, a process that is illegal but continues to be practiced openly.

== Prevention ==
=== Legislation ===
Child prostitution in Thailand is a controversial topic, and children who are a part of this trade are being compensated by various laws. An act passed in 1996 states that "it is prohibited to engage in sexual intercourse or sexual acts in a 'prostitution establishment' with a person under 18 years of age, regardless of consent". The slightest idea or mention of child prostitution through public solicitation, advertising, or association with another person involved in prostitution would be considered illegal. The World Congress Against Commercial Sexual Exploitation of Children contributed to this act during its meeting in Stockholm, where they "work[ed] towards combating all forms of commercial sexual exploitation of children."

Prostitution in general is also an ongoing problem, but the Thai government has enacted laws to combat the issue. Thailand passed the Prostitution Prevention and Suppression Act, which focuses on "the total elimination of entry into the commercial sex business by children of both sexes under 18". The act also finds individuals profiting from prostitution, such as pimps and brothel owners, more culpable than the prostitutes themselves. In addition, any government or law enforcement official involved in prostitution in any way "shall be punished with imprisonment of 15–20 years and a fine of 300,000–400,000 baht".

=== Government cooperation ===
There are organisations formed together to help enforce these laws. The Stockholm Declaration has been described as "In accordance with the Stockholm Declaration, close interaction and cooperation between government and non-government sectors is necessary to effectively plan, implement and evaluate measures to combat CSEC." Government officials have set laws in place and intend to follow through with each violation regarding child prostitution. The conference of Stockholm merged the "Agenda for Action," which is a set of strategies used to attack child prostitution globally.

=== NGOs ===
Another organisation to help is ECPAT, or End Child Prostitution, Pornography, and Trafficking in Children for Sexual Exploitation, and it has become one of the leading NGOs fighting child prostitution on a global scale. Its website states: "The ECPAT Foundation advocates the implementation and monitoring of the Convention of the Rights of the Child (CRC) and its protocols and engages with networks of human rights and child protection agencies at a national and local level. The foundation supports children and young people who have survived exploitation or are still at risk by encouraging them to participate as key actors to protect themselves and other children in similar situations." NGOs that aim to protect children from prostitution include Human Help Network Foundation Thailand, among others.

== See also ==
- Prostitution in Thailand
- Child Prostitution
- Human trafficking in Thailand
- ECPAT
