= See You (Depeche Mode song) =

Single by Depeche Mode

from the album A Broken Frame
- B-side: "Now, This Is Fun"
- Released: 29 January 1982 (UK); 16 July 1982 (US 12″)
- Recorded: December 1981
- Studio: Blackwing (London)
- Genre: Synth-pop
- Length: 3:55 (7″/single version); 4:34 (album version); 4:50 (12″ version)
- Label: Mute
- Songwriter: Martin Gore
- Producers: Depeche Mode; Daniel Miller

Depeche Mode singles chronology
"Just Can't Get Enough" (1981)	"See You" (1982)	"The Meaning of Love" (1982)

Music video
- "See You" on YouTube

Professional ratings
Review scores
Source	Rating
AllMusic	4/5 stars

"See You" is the fourth UK single by the English electronic band Depeche Mode, and the first Depeche Mode single written by Martin Gore. The single was released on 29 January 1982 and was later included on the band's second album A Broken Frame. It was the first single the band released as a trio, due to Vince Clarke's departure the previous year.

== Background ==
Depeche Mode had released their first album Speak & Spell in October 1981 and in December, founding member Vince Clarke left the band. That same month, the remaining members of Depeche Mode, Martin Gore, Andrew Fletcher and Dave Gahan, went back to Blackwing Studios to record a new song, as they felt the pressure to continue the band after a string of successful singles, and none of them wanted to return to their old lives. Producer Daniel Miller said "I knew Depeche wouldn't break up. Martin had already written some very good songs, it was only because Vince was so prolific that Martin hadn't done more." Singer Dave Gahan remembered that continuing without Clarke "was a new challenge. When Vince was with us we were happy to let him do all the writing, because too many songwriters in a band can be a very bad thing. But Martin used to write all the time. He had 20 or 30 songs which went back to when he was 16 or 17. 'See You', for instance, was one of the first things he ever wrote!" The band reworked the song and recorded "See You" as their next single.

== Release ==
Released on 29 January 1982 in the UK, "See You" went on to reach number 6 on the UK charts. To support the song, Depeche Mode embarked on the See You Tour, with shows in the UK, Europe and the US from January to May 1982. "See You" was included on the band's second album, A Broken Frame (1982). The UK saw a 7" and 12" single release by Mute Records (catalogue numbers 7MUTE018 and 12MUTE018, respectively), and in Germany, distributor Intercord released the single with catalogue number 111.802 with a limited number released on red vinyl. A promotional "See You" handheld mirror was also distributed in the UK by Mute as a promotional gimmick. In the US, Sire Records released the single as a 12" only, with no accompanying 7" vinyl. Promotional releases of the 7" single were released in Italy, Spain, Japan and New Zealand.

The single launched the See You Tour in the first half of 1982, the first to feature band member Alan Wilder, although he did not contribute to the song or the album.

B-side "Now, This Is Fun" was a new song written for the single's release. Before its release, "Now, This Is Fun" was called "Reason for Fun".

Mute and Depeche Mode commissioned German painter Moritz Reichelt to create the single's artwork. Reichelt had set up both a new wave artwork gallery in 1978 and the independent record label Ata Tak, of which both Miller and Gore were fans. Reichelt also created the artwork for Depeche Mode's subsequent single, "The Meaning of Love" (1982).

"See You" was performed on the German TV show "Bananas" on 27 April 1982, and a live performance from the A Broken Frame tour recorded on 25 October 1982 appeared on the limited edition single for the song "Get the Balance Right!" (1983).

The song was included on several later Depeche Mode compilation albums, including The Singles 81→85 (1985) and Catching Up with Depeche Mode (1985).

== Music video ==
The video for "See You" was directed by Julien Temple. Part of the video was shot at a Woolworths store in Hounslow, Middlesex. The video, which included Wilder for the first time, wasn't seen in a good light by the band; it was omitted from the Some Great Videos (1985) video collection due to the band's dislike for it.

== Track listing ==
All tracks written by Martin L. Gore

7″: Mute / 7Mute18 (UK)

1. "See You" (single version) – 3:55
2. "Now, This Is Fun" – 3:23

12″: Mute / 12Mute18 (UK)

1. "See You" (extended version) – 4:50
2. "Now, This Is Fun" (extended version) – 4:45
- Re-released in 2018 as a part of the A Broken Frame: The 12″ Singles box set

CD: Mute / Intercord Ton GmbH / CDMute18 / INT 826.802 (West Germany) – released in 1988

1. "See You" (extended version) – 4:52
2. "Now, This Is Fun" (extended version) – 4:42
3. "See You" (7″ version) – 3:59

CD: Mute / CDMute18 (UK) – released in 1991

1. "See You" (extended version) – 4:50
2. "Now, This Is Fun" – 3:23
3. "Now, This Is Fun" (extended version) – 4:45

12″: Sire / Sire 29957-0 (US)

1. "See You" (extended version) – 4:50
2. "Now, This Is Fun" (extended version) – 4:45
3. "The Meaning of Love" (Fairly Odd mix) – 4:59
4. "See You" (single version) – 3:55

CD: Sire / 40292-2 (US) – released in 1991

1. "See You" (extended version) – 4:50
2. "Now, This Is Fun" – 3:23
3. "Now, This Is Fun" (extended version) – 4:45

== Charts ==
Weekly chart performance for "See You"
Chart (1982)	Peak position
Ireland (IRMA)	9
Netherlands (Dutch Top 40 Tipparade)	13
Netherlands (Single Top 100)	49
UK Singles (OCC)	6
UK Indie (MRIB)	1
West Germany (GfK)	44
