= Brian Griffin (photographer) =

English photographer (1948–2024)

- Born: 13 April 1948; Birmingham, England
- Died: 27 January 2024 (aged 75); Rotherhithe, London, England
- Known for: Photography
- Style: Surrealist
- Awards: Royal Photographic Society's Centenary Medal; 2013
- Website: briangriffin.co.uk

Brian James Griffin (13 April 1948 – 27 January 2024) was a British photographer. His portraits of 1980s pop musicians led to him being named the "photographer of the decade" by The Guardian in 1989. His work is held in the permanent collections of the Arts Council, British Council, Victoria and Albert Museum and National Portrait Gallery, London.

== Early life ==
Griffin was born in Birmingham on 13 April 1948. He grew up in Lye, a town in the Black Country, an area of the British Midlands, and attended Halesowen Technical School. At age 16, he began working in a factory as a trainee draughtsman. He spent the next few years working in engineering for the British Steel Corporation, first making conveyors and later manufacturing and installing pipework in nuclear power stations. After joining a local camera club, Griffin studied (along with contemporaries Charlie Meecham, Daniel Meadows, Peter Fraser and Martin Parr) photography at the Manchester School of Art, which became part of Manchester Polytechnic whilst he was there and from which he graduated in 1972.

== Career ==
After college, Griffin moved to London to work as a fashion photographer. At the recommendation of Lester Bookbinder he instead took a job as a corporate photographer for the London-based business magazine Management Today, and later other publications, including Accountancy Age, Computing, and Marketing. His 1974 photograph "Rush Hour, London Bridge" brought him national recognition; a print is now in the collection of the Victoria and Albert Museum. By the 1980s, Griffin had become known as a corporate photography expert. His first solo show was in London in 1981.

Around this same time, Griffin began working in the music industry, landing his first music gigs with Stiff Records. His work shooting businessmen translated well to many of the groups of the time who also dressed in suits and ties, such as the Jam and Elvis Costello and the Attractions. Over the next few years, he photographed such acts as Siouxsie Sioux, Kate Bush, Depeche Mode, Ultravox, Toyah Willcox, R.E.M., Billy Idol, Iggy Pop, Ringo Starr, Queen and Peter Gabriel. His work appeared on many album covers of the era, notably the first four album releases of Echo & the Bunnymen, and Depeche Mode's A Broken Frame (1982), which is often cited as one of the best color photographs ever shot. The photograph also appears on the cover of Life's 1990 edition of "World's Best Photographs 1980–1990". His work appeared in publications such as Esquire (US), Rolling Stone, Radio Times, The Sunday Times, The Sunday Telegraph, The Observer, and Car.

Griffin, whose father died from lung cancer related to his factory job, drew upon the backgrounds of his photographic subjects, many of whom were workers and tradesmen. This led to his developing a photographic style that has since been referred to as capitalist realism. Although the term has been used to describe other forms of art, he is credited with being the first to develop the style in photography. Griffin himself was unsure of who came up with the term. His work has been described as being influenced by Renaissance masters, Symbolism, and Surrealism, with "film noir" lighting, and he cited David Lynch as an influence.

In 1989, The Guardian named Griffin "photographer of the decade". In the same year, he left photography behind to focus on TV commercials, music videos, and films. For many years, he owned a production company where he worked as a commercial director. Griffin returned to stills in the early 2000s, shooting "People and the City" to help Birmingham be named a European Capital of Culture. He shot a documentary for Paul McCartney (2004) and worked on numerous advertising campaigns, including those for British Airways and Sony. In 2010, his portraiture retrospective, Face to Face, was exhibited in Birmingham.

In 2017, Griffin was invited to undertake an artist's residency in Béthune-Bruay, northern France. His work led him to photograph people such as British politician Sebastian Coe, actress Helen Mirren, chat show host Jonathan Ross and fashion designer/businesswoman Dame Vivienne Westwood.

== Personal life and death ==
Griffin died on 27 January 2024, at the age of 75.

== Publications ==
- Brian Griffin. Self-published, 1978. Photographs by Griffin, drawings by Barney Bubbles. Edition of 500 copies.
- Power: British Management in Focus. London: Travelling Light, 1981. ISBN 9780906333136. With a text by Richard Smith and an introduction by Peter Parker.
- Open: Twenty One Photographs. Black Pudding, 1986. Edition of 350 copies ("standard edition") plus 65 copies ("collector's edition").
- Work. Central Books, 1989. ISBN 978-0951385913
- The Black Kingdom. Stockport: Dewi Lewis, 2013. ISBN 978-1907893346.
- Pop. London: Gost, 2017. ISBN 978-1-910401-13-2. With essays by Terry Rawlings and Paul Gorman.
- Spud. London: Gost, 2018. ISBN 978-1-910401-21-7.
- Mode. Self-published, 2023. ISBN 978-1-3999-5968-1. With contributions by Simon Helm and Roger K. Burton. Photographs of Depeche Mode.

== Exhibitions ==
- Three Perspectives on Photography Hayward Gallery, London 1979
- The Black Country, Collège des Bernardins, Paris, 2010/2011; New Art Gallery Walsall, 2011

== Awards ==
- 1984: Most Outstanding Award for Photography, Design and Art Direction (for the album cover of Depeche Mode's A Broken Frame)
- 1987: Freedom of the City of Arles, Les Rencontres d'Arles
- 1988: Most Outstanding Award for Self-Promotional Item, Design and Art Direction (for Portraits)
- 1988: Most Outstanding Award for Promotional Magazine, Design and Art Direction (for Broadgate)
- 1989: Most Outstanding Award for Photography in a Book, Design and Art Direction (for Work)
- 1989: Photographer of the Decade, The Guardian
- 1991: Best Photography Book in the World, Barcelona Primavera Fotografica
- 2006: Honorary Fellowship of the Royal Photographic Society
- 2006: Photographer of the Year, British Press Awards (shortlisted)
- 2013: Centenary Medal of the Royal Photographic Society for distinguished persons connected with the art or science of photography
- 2014: honorary doctorate, Birmingham City University (for his lifetime contribution to the City of Birmingham)
- 2016: Best in Books for Design, Creative Review

== Collections ==
Griffin's work is held in the following permanent collections:

- Arts Council, UK
- British Council
- Victoria and Albert Museum, London
- National Portrait Gallery, London: 26 prints (as of September 2020)
