= List of Billboard number-one dance/disco singles of 1987 =

Billboard magazine compiled the top-performing dance singles in the United States on the Hot Dance/Disco Club Play chart and the Hot Dance/Disco 12-inch Singles Sales chart. Premiered in 1976, the Club Play chart ranked the most-played singles on dance club based on reports from a national sample of club DJs. The 12-inch Singles Sales chart was launched in 1985 to compile the best-selling dance singles based on retail sales across the United States. The word "disco" was removed from the title of the section of both charts beginning on September 19, 1987. Billboard retitled the section Hot Dance Music on October 24, 1987.

== Charts history ==
Chart history
| Issue date | Hot Dance/Disco Club Play | | Hot Dance/Disco 12-inch Singles Sales | | Ref. |
| Issue date | Title | Artist(s) | Title | Artist(s) | Ref. |
|---|---|---|---|---|---|
| January 3 | "Control" | Janet Jackson | "Brand New Lover" | Dead or Alive | |
| January 10 | "Musique Non Stop" | Kraftwerk | "Brand New Lover" | Dead or Alive | |
| January 17 | "Someone like You" | Sylvester | "Brand New Lover" | Dead or Alive | |
| January 24 | "Come Go with Me" | Exposé | "Brand New Lover" | Dead or Alive | |
| January 31 | "Come Go with Me" | Exposé | "Someone like You" | Sylvester | |
| February 7 | "C'est La Vie" | Robbie Nevil | "Someone like You" | Sylvester | |
| February 14 | "Open Your Heart" | Madonna | "We Connect"(Remix) | Stacey Q | |
| February 21 | "Showing Out (Get Fresh at the Weekend)"/ "System" | Mel and Kim | "We Connect"(Remix) | Stacey Q | |
| February 28 | "One Look (One Look Was Enough)" | Paul Parker | "Showing Out (Get Fresh at the Weekend)"/ "System" | Mel and Kim | |
| March 7 | "Fascinated" | Company B | "Showing Out (Get Fresh at the Weekend)"/ "System" | Mel and Kim | |
| March 14 | "Fascinated" | Company B | "Fascinated" | Company B | |
| March 21 | "Fascinated" | Company B | "Fascinated" | Company B | |
| March 28 | "Fascinated" | Company B | "Fascinated" | Company B | |
| April 4 | "Looking for a New Love" | Jody Watley | "Fascinated" | Company B | |
| April 11 | "Looking for a New Love" | Jody Watley | "Lean on Me" | Club Nouveau | |
| April 18 | "Lean on Me" | Club Nouveau | "Lean on Me" | Club Nouveau | |
| April 25 | "The Telephone Call" | Kraftwerk | "Looking for a New Love" | Jody Watley | |
| May 2 | "The Telephone Call" | Kraftwerk | "Sign 'O' The Times" | Prince | |
| May 9 | "Certain Things Are Likely" | KTP | "Sign 'O' The Times" | Prince | |
| May 16 | "Certain Things Are Likely" | KTP | "La Isla Bonita" (Remix) | Madonna | |
| May 23 | "Certain Things Are Likely" | KTP | "Something in My House" (Remix) | Dead Or Alive | |
| May 30 | "Head to Toe" | Lisa Lisa and Cult Jam | "Head to Toe" | Lisa Lisa and Cult Jam | |
| June 6 | "The Pleasure Principle" | Janet Jackson | "Head to Toe" | Lisa Lisa and Cult Jam | |
| June 13 | "The Pleasure Principle" | Janet Jackson | "Head to Toe" | Lisa Lisa and Cult Jam | |
| June 20 | "Diamonds" | Herb Alpert | "Head to Toe" | Lisa Lisa and Cult Jam | |
| June 27 | "Diamonds" | Herb Alpert | "Head to Toe" | Lisa Lisa and Cult Jam | |
| July 4 | "Respectable" | Mel and Kim | "Diamonds" (Remix) | Herb Alpert | |
| July 11 | "In Love with Love" | Debbie Harry | "Diamonds" (Remix) | Herb Alpert | |
| July 18 | "I Wanna Dance with Somebody (Who Loves Me)" | Whitney Houston | "Funky Town" (Remix) | Pseudo Echo | |
| July 25 | "I Wanna Dance with Somebody (Who Loves Me)" | Whitney Houston | "Respectable" | Mel and Kim | |
| August 1 | "Strangelove" | Depeche Mode | "I Want Your Sex" / "Hard Day" | George Michael | |
| August 8 | "Strangelove" | Depeche Mode | "Insecurity" | Stacey Q | |
| August 15 | "Strangelove" | Depeche Mode | "I Want Your Sex" / "Hard Day" | George Michael | |
| August 22 | "Tina Cherry" | Georgio | "I Want Your Sex" / "Hard Day" | George Michael | |
| August 29 | "When Smokey Sings"/ "Chicago" | ABC | "Fake" | Alexander O'Neal | |
| September 5 | "When Smokey Sings"/ "Chicago" | ABC | "Who Found Who" | Jellybean Featuring Elisa Fiorillo | |
| September 12 | "How Soon We Forget" | Colonel Abrams | "Who Found Who" | Jellybean Featuring Elisa Fiorillo | |
| September 19 | "How Soon We Forget" | Colonel Abrams | "Dreamin'" (Remix) | Will To Power | |
| September 26 | "Catch Me (I'm Falling)" | Pretty Poison | "Dreamin'" (Remix) | Will To Power | |
| October 3 | "Victim of Love" | Erasure | "Casanova" | LeVert | |
| October 10 | "Don't You Want Me" | Jody Watley | "Full Circle" (Remix) | Company B | |
| October 17 | "Don't You Want Me" | Jody Watley | "Full Circle" (Remix) | Company B | |
| October 24 | "The Real Thing" | Jellybean featuring Steven Dante | "Causing a Commotion" (Remix) | Madonna | |
| October 31 | "Causing a Commotion" | Madonna | "Bad" (Remix) | Michael Jackson | |
| November 7 | "Bad" | Michael Jackson | "Bad" (Remix) | Michael Jackson | |
| November 14 | "Bad" | Michael Jackson | "Bad" (Remix) | Michael Jackson | |
| November 21 | "System of Survival" | Earth, Wind & Fire | "Bad" (Remix) | Michael Jackson | |
| November 28 | "System of Survival" | Earth, Wind & Fire | "Bad" (Remix) | Michael Jackson | |
| December 5 | "System of Survival" | Earth, Wind & Fire | "Shake Your Love" (Remix) | Debbie Gibson | |
| December 12 | "Pump Up the Volume" | M|A|R|R|S | "Shake Your Love" (Remix) | Debbie Gibson | |
| December 19 | "Pump Up the Volume" | M|A|R|R|S | "System of Survival" (Remix) | Earth, Wind & Fire | |
| December 26 | "So Emotional" | Whitney Houston | "System of Survival" (Remix) | Earth, Wind & Fire | |

== See also ==
- 1987 in music
- List of Billboard Hot 100 number ones of 1987
