= Sugarland (album) =

Studio album by Kissing the Pink
- Released: 1993
- Recorded: Houston, Texas
- Genre: Dance-pop, psychedelic music
- Label: SPV GmbH
- Producer: Kissing the Pink

Kissing the Pink chronology
Certain Things Are Likely (1986)	Sugarland (1993)	Digital People (2015)

Singles from Sugarland
- 1. "Dalai Lama Loves You All" Released: 1993

Sugarland is the fourth studio album by English band Kissing the Pink, released in 1993 by SPV GmbH, and was their first album in seven years following 1986's Certain Things Are Likely. The album was a blend of psychedelic music and dance-pop, and it features a remix of their song "Big Man Restless" which was originally released on their debut album, Naked, 10 years prior.

The album features the return of founding member George Stewart as a songwriter, who had left the band after their 1984 album What Noise, but it is not as clear as to whether or not he played on the album as only backing vocalist Rochelle Shepherd is credited in a performing role.

The album was reissued a year later on Custer's Last Stand Records, with a different track listing, album artwork, and a new track "We Are Immortal", with the omission of the track "Big Man Restless (Remix)".

It would be their last physically-released album, and last studio album overall for 22 years until 2015's Digital People.

When asked why the album was recorded in Texas, and how the band felt about it, George Stewart said:

"We knew some people in Houston, and at the beginning of '91, having been dumped by Warner Bros, we decided we'd just make some music ourselves, without any music biz crap, so we just took all our gear (which by that stage was sampler/sequencer based) over to the USA, rented a place to live, rented a place to set up the gear, and had a good time making music and hanging out with our Texan chums. We'd all been well into the techno/rave scene by that stage, so our music was heavily oriented in that direction, but we foresaw that this would mix with psychedelic rock at some stage, and we tried to be ahead of the game. Sugarland is the only KTP thing that I would say Jon [Kingsley Hall], Nick [Whitecross] and I have few regrets about musically - it's pretty much uncompromised and finished.

== Track listing ==
All tracks are written by George Stewart, Jon Kingsley Hall, and Nick Whitecross.

No.	Title	Length
1.	"Sugarland"	4:10
2.	"George Foreman"	4:01
3.	"Tree of Love"	5:12
4.	"Silence"	6:03
5.	"Capsized"	4:33
6.	"Dalai Lama"	4:30
7.	"State of Love"	4:54
8.	"Service of God"	4:59
9.	"Moving On"	5:21
10.	"Big Man Restless (Remix)"	3:13

== Personnel ==
Credits are adapted from the Sugarland liner notes.

- Rochelle Shepherd – backing vocals
- Kissing the Pink – producer
- Jury-Bailey – cover design
