= Raise Your Hands – The Greatest Hits =

Raise Your Hands - The Greatest Hits

Greatest hits album by X-Press 2
- Released: 2008
- Label: Skint Records

X-Press 2 chronology
Makeshift Feelgood (2006)	Raise Your Hands - The Greatest Hits (2008)

Raise Your Hands – The Greatest Hits is a compilation album by English electronic dance music group X-Press 2. Disc One contained tracks from the first two albums and the new track "Fire". Disc Two contained remixes of X-Press 2 songs and remixes by X-Press 2.

The album was released internationally on 8 July 2008. It was accompanied by a remix competition of the new track "Fire" on the music download website trackitdown.net.

X-Press announced a six-hour DJ set at the launch party for the compilation on their Myspace page. The launch party took place on 15 August 2008 at the Ministry of Sound nightclub in London, England.

== Track listing ==
=== Disc one ===
1. "Lazy" (featuring David Byrne)
2. "London Xpress"
3. "Smoke Machine"
4. "Kill 100" (featuring Rob Harvey)
5. "AC/DC"
6. "Muzikizum"
7. "Give It" (featuring Kurt Wagner)
8. "Muzik Xpress"
9. "Rock 2 House" [Plastikman's Acid House Remix]
10. "Fire" (featuring Afrika Bambaataa)
11. "Witchi Tai To" (featuring Tim De Laughter)

=== Disc two ===
1. X-Press 2 / "Lazy" (featuring David Byrne) [Freeform Reform]
2. X-Press 2 / "Kill 100" (featuring Rob Harvey) [Carl Craig Remix]
3. X-Press 2 / "Supasonic" [Soul Mekanik 1am Version]
4. X-Press 2 / "Call That Love" (featuring Steve Edwards) [Radioslave Remix]
5. X-Press 2 / "Muzikizum" [Superchumbo Remix]
6. X-Press 2 / "Give It" (featuring Kurt Wagner) [Switch 'Give It More' Remix]
7. X-Press 2 / "Lazy" (featuring David Byrne) [Norman Cook Remix]
8. X-Press 2 / "Don't Make Me Wait" (featuring Bernard Fowler) [ Diesel Remix]
9. X-Press 2 / "Enjoy The Ride" (featuring Kissing The Pink) [Ashley Beedle's Magic Session Vocal Mix]
10. Fatboy Slim / "Star 69" [X-Press 2's Wine 'Em Dine 'Em, 69 'Em Remix]
11. Missy Elliott / "We Run This" [X-Press 2's Rave 'N' Bleep Remix]
12. Kelis / "Milkshake" [X-Press 2 Triple Thick Vocal Remix]
13. Nitzer Ebb / "Join The Chant" [X-Press 2 Remix]
