= Strangelove (song) =

1987 single by Depeche Mode

Single by Depeche Mode

from the album Music for the Masses
- B-side: "Pimpf"; "Agent Orange"
- Released: 13 April 1987
- Recorded: Late 1986
- Genre: Synth-pop; new wave
- Length: 3:44 (single version); 4:56 (album version)
- Label: Mute
- Songwriter: Martin L. Gore
- Producers: Depeche Mode; David Bascombe

Depeche Mode singles chronology
"But Not Tonight" (1986)	"Strangelove" (1987)	"Never Let Me Down Again" (1987)

Music video
- "Strangelove" on YouTube

"Strangelove" is a song by English electronic band Depeche Mode, released on 13 April 1987 as the lead single from their sixth studio album, Music for the Masses (1987).

It was an international success, reaching number 16 on the UK Singles Chart, number two in West Germany and South Africa, and the top 20 in several other countries, including Ireland, Spain, Sweden and Switzerland. In the United States, it reached number 50 on the Billboard Hot 100 and was the first of nine number ones on the US Hot Dance Club Play chart, where it stayed for three weeks at the top. The band considered the song instrumental in helping them break into chart success and broad popularity in the American market, which they had struggled with for most of their career to that point.

== Background ==
Depeche Mode had released their album Black Celebration in early 1986, followed up with a supporting tour which lasted through the middle of that year, and contributed the song "But Not Tonight" to the soundtrack to the film Modern Girls (1986).

== Recording ==
=== Initial version ===
In late 1986, Martin Gore played demos of the songs he'd been developing to the rest of the band at Alan Wilder's home studio. The demo was played via a Yamaha synthesizer. Daniel Miller, citing growing tension in the studio during the recording of Black Celebration, had stepped away from producing Depeche Mode's music for this album, and instead they worked with David Bascombe, who had just completed working as a recording engineer with Tears for Fears on their album Songs from the Big Chair (1985). Alan Wilder was described by Miller as the person who had the vision for how the album should sound and "steered the ship" in the studio for the album including "Strangelove", and as such Bascombe, although officially a producer for the record, instead acted more as a sound engineer. Recording for the initial version of "Strangelove" took place at Wilder's home studio. The initial single was mixed before the rest of the album's recording was completed, and released five months before the album. That initial single version was the band's first mix of the song, which they put out so they could move on with the rest of the album.

One B-side to "Strangelove" is an instrumental called "Pimpf". As Studio Guillaume Tell was converted from an old cinema, there were some old instruments left about that the band used to record the track, including old orchestral bass drums and timpanis. Originally intended as only a B-side, the band liked Bascombe's mix of "Pimpf" enough to include it as the closing track of the album, which Bascombe said was his favorite mix of all the songs from the entire album. The name is a reference to recruits of the Deutsches Jungvolk, a division of the Hitler Youth meant for those members who were ages 10–14, who were called Pimpfe.

"Agent Orange"
Sample containing the Morse code referred to in the text to the left.

A second instrumental B-side, "Agent Orange", is named after the herbicide used in the Vietnam War. "Agent Orange" was included on the CD and cassette versions of Music for the Masses.

=== Album version ===
The band felt that, while the initial version of the song was "upbeat", it was too "cluttered" and didn't fit in with the darker feeling of the rest of the album, so it was remixed again based on Miller's "Blind" remix of the song, which resulted in a kind of "hybrid" remix for the album. Bascombe remembered that Gore and Wilder couldn't agree on which bass line to use for the song: Gore thought a faster bass line was better, while Wilder proposed a slower one. A compromise was reached when Bascombe suggested that they use both, which is how the song appeared on the album. Bascombe said that he and Wilder, along with occasional input from singer Dave Gahan, were responsible for the final album mix.

== Release ==
"Strangelove" was released on 13 April 1987 by Mute Records in the UK, Intercord Records in West Germany, Sire Records in the US, and Alfa Records in Japan. In the UK, the release saw a 7" release (catalogue number 7BONG13), a 7" promo (RBONG13), a 12" release (12BONG13), a limited edition 12" release (L12BONG13), and 3 promotional 12" releases (SBONG13, CLUBBONG13 and DANCEBONG13), the latter of which saw a small number of blue vinyl pressings. In West Germany, Intercord Records released the 7" on red vinyl (catalogue number INT 111.848). Sire Records released a promotional 7" in Canada (92 83667), and in the US, as promotional 12" (PRO-A-2780). In Japan, a 7" release was released with custom artwork (ALI-765).

The band appeared on the BBC's Top of the Pops on 7 May 1987 to promote the song, and on 7 September 1988, they performed it at the 1988 MTV Video Music Awards at the Universal Amphitheatre in Los Angeles.

=== Strangelove '88 ===
Due to the success of the US leg of the Music for the Masses tour in early 1988, Sire Records re-released "Strangelove" with new mixes as "Strangelove '88" on 23 August 1988. Remixed by Tim Simenon of Bomb the Bass, it reached number 50 on the Billboard Hot 100.

== Music videos ==
The music video for "Strangelove" was directed by Anton Corbijn. A music video for "Strangelove '88" was shot separately by Martin Atkyns. Corbijn's video, shot in black and white in Paris, was described as using "a visual language related to Italian neorealism." Corbijn's video appears on the Strange (1988) video, and both are included on The Videos 86>98 (2002) and Video Singles Collection (2016).

== Other releases ==
Remixes of "Strangelove" have appeared on various best-of compilations such The Singles 86–98 (1998), Remixes 81–04 (2004), The Best of Depeche Mode Volume 1 (2006), and Remixes 2: 81–11 (2011). Live versions appear on 101 (1989) and releases of Recording the Universe (2010).

== Reception and legacy ==
In 2006, the band said that the single release of "Strangelove", as well as the subsequent release of the album Music for the Masses and its supporting tour were important for the band because it finally got them success in America, which they had struggled with over their career to that point. Slant Magazine, in a retrospective review in 2002, said "Strangelove" was "home to classic Martin Gore lyrics and Dave Gahan's timeless vocal". In 2017, Billboard magazine called "Strangelove" "the cooler, older sister" to their previous BDSM-themed song, "Master and Servant" (1984), including "Strangelove" on their list of Top 20 Depeche Mode songs at number 8.

== Track listings ==
All tracks are written by Martin L. Gore.

- UK 7-inch single (BONG13)
- US 7-inch single (7-28366)
1. "Strangelove" – 3:45
2. "Pimpf" – 4:33
- UK 12-inch single (12BONG13)
1. "Strangelove (Maxi Mix)" – 6:32
2. "Strangelove (Midi Mix)" – 1:38
3. "Fpmip" – 5:23
- UK limited-edition 12-inch single (L12BONG13)
1. "Strangelove (Blind Mix)" – 6:31
2. "Pimpf" – 4:33
3. "Strangelove (Pain Mix)" – 7:19 (remixed by Phil Harding)
4. "Agent Orange" – 5:05
- UK promotional 12-inch single (DANCEBONG13)
1. "Strangelove (Blind Mix)" – 6:31
2. "Strangelove (The Fresh Ground Mix)" – 8:14 (remixed by Phil Harding)
- UK CD single (CDBONG13)
1. "Strangelove (Maxi Mix)" – 6:32
2. "Pimpf" – 4:33
3. "Strangelove (Midi Mix)" – 1:38
4. "Agent Orange" – 5:05
5. "Strangelove" – 3:45

Originally released in card sleeve (1987) in two different versions (black-labeled and red-labeled disc), later re-released in a regular jewel case.

- 1992 UK CD single (CDBONG13)
1. "Strangelove" – 3:45
2. "Pimpf" – 4:33
3. "Strangelove (Maxi Mix)" – 6:32
4. "Agent Orange" – 5:05
5. "Strangelove (Blind Mix)" – 6:31
6. "Fpmip" – 5:23
7. "Strangelove (Pain Mix)" – 7:19
8. "Strangelove (Midi Mix)" – 1:38
- US 12-inch single (0-20696)
1. "Strangelove (Maxi Mix)" – 6:32
2. "Strangelove (Midi Mix)" – 1:38
3. "Strangelove (Blind Mix Edit)" – 6:10
4. "Fpmip" – 5:21
- US limited-edition 12-inch single (0-20769)
1. "Strangelove" (Pain Mix) – 7:19
2. "Strangelove" (Pain Mix 7" Edit) – 3:29
3. "Agent Orange" – 5:05
- US 3-inch CD single (2-27777)
1. "Strangelove (Remix Edit)" – 3:52 (remixed by Tim Simenon & Mark Saunders)
2. "Nothing (Remix Edit)" – 3:58 (remixed by Justin Strauss)
- US 7-inch single (7-27777)
1. "Strangelove" (Album Version 7" Edit) – 3:44
2. "Nothing" (Remix Edit) – 3:58

Also released on cassette (27991-4)

=== Strangelove '88 ===
- US 12-inch single (0-21022)
1. "Strangelove (Highjack Mix)" – 6:30 (remixed by Tim Simenon & Mark Saunders)
2. "Strangelove (Remix Edit)" – 3:46
3. "Nothing (Zip Hop Mix)" – 7:06 (remixed by Justin Strauss)
4. "Nothing (Dub Mix)" – 6:40 (remixed by Justin Strauss)
- US promotional CD single (PRO-CD-3213)
1. "Strangelove" (Remix Edit) – 3:46
2. "Strangelove" (Album Version 7" Edit) – 3:44
3. "Strangelove" (Blind Mix 7" Edit) – 3:57
4. "Strangelove" (Highjack Mix) – 6:30

The "Zip Hop Mix" of Nothing (titled "Justin Strauss Mix") was also released as one of thirteen (digital download) "Rare Tracks" accompanying Depeche Mode's remix compilation, Remixes 81–04 (2004).

== Charts ==
=== Weekly charts ===
1987–1988 weekly chart performance for "Strangelove"
Chart (1987–1988)	Peak position
Austria (Ö3 Austria Top 40)	29
Belgium (Ultratop 50 Flanders)	20
Canada Dance/Urban (RPM)	11
Denmark (Tracklisten)	3
Europe (European Hot 100 Singles)	6
Finland (Suomen virallinen lista)	2
France (SNEP)	25
Ireland (IRMA)	5
Italy (Musica e dischi)	14
Netherlands (Dutch Top 40)	24
Netherlands (Single Top 100)	30
South Africa (Springbok Radio)	2
Spain (AFYVE)	12
Sweden (Sverigetopplistan)	5
Switzerland (Schweizer Hitparade)	3
UK Singles (Official Charts)	16
UK Indie (MRIB)	2
US Billboard Hot 100	50
US Dance Club Songs (Billboard)	1
US Dance Singles Sales (Billboard)	5
US Cash Box Top 100 Singles	41
West Germany (GfK)	2

2021 weekly chart performance for "Strangelove"
Chart (2021)	Peak position
Hungary (Single Top 40)	38

=== Year-end charts ===
Year-end chart performance for "Strangelove"
Chart (1987)	Position
Europe (European Hot 100 Singles)	41
South Africa (Springbok Radio)	15
Switzerland (Schweizer Hitparade)	24
US 12-inch Singles Sales (Billboard)	26
US Dance Club Play (Billboard)	4
West Germany (Media Control)	43

== Certifications ==
Region	Certification	Certified units/sales
United States (RIAA)	Gold	500,000^{‡}
^{‡} Sales+streaming figures based on certification alone.

== See also ==
- List of number-one dance singles of 1987 (U.S.)
