= One Step =

One Step may refer to:

- "One Step" (Bettina Soriat song), the Austrian entry in the Eurovision Song Contest 1997 by Bettina Soriat
- "One Step" (Kissing the Pink song), 1986
- One Step (film), an upcoming Korean film
- "One Step", a song by The Original 7ven from Condensate
- "One Step", a song by Killah Priest from Heavy Mental
- "One Step", a song by Ronnie Lane from See Me
- One-Step, a type of ballroom dance
