= List of UK Independent Singles Chart number ones of 2002 =

These are the Official UK Charts Company's Official Indie Chart number one hits of 2002.

Issue date	Song	Artist	Record label
6 January	"Drowning"	Backstreet Boys	Jive
13 January	"Addicted to Bass"	Puretone	Gut
20 January	"Addicted to Bass"	Puretone	Gut
27 January	"Overprotected"	Britney Spears	Jive
3 February	"Addicted to Bass"	Puretone	Gut
10 February	"Addicted to Bass"	Puretone	Gut
17 February	"To Get Down"	Timo Maas	Perfecto
24 February	"The World's Greatest"	R. Kelly	Jive
3 March	"The World's Greatest"	R. Kelly	Jive
10 March	"The World's Greatest"	R. Kelly	Jive
17 March	"The World's Greatest"	R. Kelly	Jive
24 March	"The World's Greatest"	R. Kelly	Jive
31 March	"Silent Sigh"	Badly Drawn Boy	XL
7 April	"I'm Not a Girl, Not Yet a Woman"	Britney Spears	Jive
13 April	"Lazy"	X-Press 2 featuring David Byrne	Skint
20 April	"Girlfriend"	NSYNC	Jive
27 April	"Girlfriend"	NSYNC	Jive
5 May	"Girlfriend"	NSYNC	Jive
12 May	"Girlfriend"	NSYNC	Jive
19 May	"Just a Little"	Liberty X	V2
26 May	"Just a Little"	Liberty X	V2
2 June	"Just a Little"	Liberty X	V2
9 June	"Just a Little"	Liberty X	V2
16 June	"The Logical Song"	Scooter	Sheffield Tunes
23 June	"The Logical Song"	Scooter	Sheffield Tunes
30 June	"The Logical Song"	Scooter	Sheffield Tunes
7 July	"The Logical Song"	Scooter	Sheffield Tunes
14 July	"The Logical Song"	Scooter	Sheffield Tunes
21 July	"The Logical Song"	Scooter	Sheffield Tunes
28 July	"The Logical Song"	Scooter	Sheffield Tunes
4 August	"Boys"	Britney Spears featuring Pharrell	Jive
11 August	"Girl All the Bad Guys Want"	Bowling For Soup	Jive
18 August	"Girl All the Bad Guys Want"	Bowling For Soup	Jive
25 August	"Starry Eyed Surprise"	Oakenfold	Perfecto
1 September	"Starry Eyed Surprise"	Oakenfold	Perfecto
8 September	"Two Months Off"	Underworld	Junior Boy's Own
15 September	"Got to Have Your Love"	Liberty X	V2
22 September	"Got to Have Your Love"	Liberty X	V2
29 September	"Nessaja"	Scooter	Sheffield Tunes
6 October	"Come Back Around"	Feeder	Echo
13 October	"Help Me"	Nick Carter	Jive
20 October	"You Were Right"	Badly Drawn Boy	XL
27 October	"Like I Love You"	Justin Timberlake	Jive
3 November	"Like I Love You"	Justin Timberlake	Jive
10 November	"Like I Love You"	Justin Timberlake	Jive
17 November	"Like I Love You"	Justin Timberlake	Jive
24 November	"Like I Love You"	Justin Timberlake	Jive
1 December	"United States of Whatever"	Liam Lynch	Global Warning
8 December	"Holding On for You"	Liberty X	V2
15 December	"Holding On for You"	Liberty X	V2
22 December	"Sacred Trust / After You're Gone"	One True Voice	Jive
29 December	"Sacred Trust / After You're Gone"	One True Voice	Jive

== See also ==
- 2002 in music
