= Sex Appeal =

Sex Appeal, or variants, may refer to:

- Sex appeal, or sexual attraction

== Music ==
- S.E.X. Appeal, a German trance music project
- Sex Appeal (album), by Georgio, 1987
- "Sex Appeal", a song by Frankie DeCarlos from the 2011 album Empire (Frankie DeCarlos album)
- "Sex Appeal", a song by Ray Cash from the 2006 album Cash on Delivery
- "Sex Appeal", a 1937 song by Eugeniusz Bodo

== Film and television ==
- Sex Appeal (2022 film), an American teen comedy film
- (Sex) Appeal, a 2014 Taiwanese-Chinese youth romance drama film
- Sex Appeal (TV series), a 1993 Brazilian television broadcast, available on Globoplay

== Other uses ==
- Sexappeal, born Anthony Rodríguez, a Dominican dancer
- Sex Appeal (horse), dam of El Gran Senor (1981–2006)

== See also ==
- Sax Appeal
- Six Appeal
- Sox Appeal
