= Raise Your Hands (disambiguation) =

Raise Your Hands is a live album by the German band Reamonn. Other uses include:

- "Raise Your Hands", 1986 song by Bon Jovi from the album Slippery When Wet
- "Raise Your Hands", 2013 song by Devo from the album Something Else for Everybody
- "Raise Your Hands", 2003 song by Krokus from the album Rock the Block
- "Raise Your Hands", a 2014 song by Ummet Ozcan

== See also ==
- "Raise Your Hand", 1967 song by Eddie Floyd
- "Would You Raise Your Hands?", 2010 song by Rogue Traders
- Raise Your Hands, Dead Man, You're Under Arrest, 1971 Italian-Spanish western film
- Raise Your Hands – The Greatest Hits, 2008 greatest hits album by X-Press 2
