= Recording the Universe =

Live album series by Depeche Mode
- Released: 2009–2010
- Recorded: 2009–2010

Depeche Mode chronology
| Sounds of the Universe (2009) | Recording the Universe (2009) | Remixes 2: 81–11 (2011) |

Recording the Universe was a project by the band Depeche Mode to record some of the concerts during their 2009–10 concert tour, Tour of the Universe. The recordings were made by London-based company Live Here Now and were available via the band's website in digital download and double CD format.

== Recording the Universe releases ==
=== Ramat Gan Stadium, Ramat Gan, Israel ===
Concert on 10 May 2009.

Track listing

Disc one

1. In Chains
2. Wrong
3. Hole to Feed
4. Walking in My Shoes
5. It's No Good
6. A Question of Time
7. Precious
8. Fly on the Windscreen
9. Jezebel
10. A Question of Lust
11. Come Back
12. Peace

Disc two

13. In Your Room
14. I Feel You
15. In Sympathy
16. Enjoy the Silence
17. Never Let Me Down Again
  1. Happy Birthday Dave
18. Stripped
19. Master and Servant
20. Strangelove
21. Personal Jesus
22. Waiting for the Night

=== Zentralstadion, Leipzig, Germany ===
Concert on 8 June 2009.

Track listing

Disc one

1. In Chains
2. Wrong
3. Hole to Feed
4. Walking in My Shoes
5. It's No Good
6. A Question of Time
7. Precious
8. Fly on the Windscreen
9. Jezebel
10. A Question of Lust
11. Come Back
12. Peace

Disc two

13. In Your Room
14. I Feel You
15. Policy of Truth
16. Enjoy the Silence
17. Never Let Me Down Again
18. Stripped
19. Master and Servant
20. Strangelove
21. Personal Jesus
22. Waiting for the Night

=== Olympiastadion, Berlin, Germany ===
Concert on 10 June 2009.

Track listing

Disc one

1. In Chains
2. Wrong
3. Hole to Feed
4. Walking in My Shoes
5. It's No Good
6. A Question of Time
7. Precious
8. Fly on the Windscreen
9. Jezebel
10. A Question of Lust
11. Come Back
12. Peace

Disc two

13. In Your Room
14. I Feel You
15. Policy of Truth
16. Enjoy the Silence
17. Never Let Me Down Again
18. Stripped
19. Master and Servant
20. Strangelove
21. Personal Jesus
22. Waiting for the Night

=== Commerzbank-Arena, Frankfurt, Germany ===
Concert on 12 June 2009.

Track listing

Disc one

1. In Chains
2. Wrong
3. Hole to Feed
4. Walking in My Shoes
5. It's No Good
6. A Question of Time
7. Precious
8. Fly on the Windscreen
9. Jezebel
10. A Question of Lust
11. Come Back
12. Peace

Disc two

13. In Your Room
14. I Feel You
15. Policy of Truth
16. Enjoy the Silence
17. Never Let Me Down Again
18. Stripped
19. Master and Servant
20. Strangelove
21. Personal Jesus
22. Waiting for the Night

=== Olympiastadion, Munich, Germany ===
Concert on 13 June 2009.

Track listing

Disc one

1. In Chains
2. Wrong
3. Hole to Feed
4. Walking in My Shoes
5. It's No Good
6. A Question of Time
7. Precious
8. Fly on the Windscreen
9. Jezebel
10. Home
11. Come Back
12. Peace

Disc two

13. In Your Room
14. I Feel You
15. Policy of Truth
16. Enjoy the Silence
17. Never Let Me Down Again
18. Stripped
19. Master and Servant
20. Strangelove
21. Personal Jesus
22. Waiting for the Night

=== Stadio Olimpico, Rome, Italy ===
Concert on 16 June 2009.

Track listing

Disc one

1. In Chains
2. Wrong
3. Hole to Feed
4. Walking in My Shoes
5. It's No Good
6. A Question of Time
7. Precious
8. Fly on the Windscreen
9. Little Soul
10. Home
11. Come Back
12. Peace

Disc two

13. In Your Room
14. I Feel You
15. Policy of Truth
16. Enjoy the Silence
17. Never Let Me Down Again
18. Stripped
19. Master and Servant
20. Strangelove
21. Personal Jesus
22. Waiting for the Night

=== Stadio Giuseppe Meazza, Milan, Italy ===
Concert on 18 June 2009.

Track listing

Disc one

1. In Chains
2. Wrong
3. Hole to Feed
4. Walking in My Shoes
5. It's No Good
6. A Question of Time
7. Precious
8. Fly on the Windscreen
9. Little Soul
10. Home
11. Come Back
12. Peace

Disc two

13. In Your Room
14. I Feel You
15. Policy of Truth
16. Enjoy the Silence
17. Never Let Me Down Again
18. Stripped
19. Master and Servant
20. Strangelove
21. Personal Jesus
22. Waiting for the Night

=== TW Classic Festival, Werchter, Belgium ===
Concert on 20 June 2009.

Track listing

Disc one

1. In Chains
2. Wrong
3. Hole to Feed
4. Walking in My Shoes
5. It's No Good
6. A Question of Time
7. Precious
8. Fly on the Windscreen
9. Little Soul
10. Home
11. Come Back
12. Peace

Disc two

13. In Your Room
14. I Feel You
15. Policy of Truth
16. Enjoy the Silence
17. Never Let Me Down Again
18. Stripped
19. Master and Servant
20. Strangelove
21. Personal Jesus
22. Waiting for the Night

=== Inter Stadium, Bratislava, Slovakia ===
Concert on 22 June 2009.

Track listing

Disc one

1. In Chains
2. Wrong
3. Hole to Feed
4. Walking in My Shoes
5. It's No Good
6. A Question of Time
7. Precious
8. Fly on the Windscreen
9. Little Soul
10. Home
11. Come Back
12. Peace

Disc two

13. In Your Room
14. I Feel You
15. Policy of Truth
16. Enjoy the Silence
17. Never Let Me Down Again
18. Stripped
19. Master and Servant
20. Strangelove
21. Personal Jesus
22. Waiting for the Night

=== Stadion Puskás Ferenc, Budapest, Hungary ===
Concert on 23 June 2009.

Track listing

Disc one

1. In Chains
2. Wrong
3. Hole to Feed
4. Walking in My Shoes
5. It's No Good
6. A Question of Time
7. Precious
8. Fly on the Windscreen
9. Jezebel
10. A Question of Lust
11. Come Back
12. Peace

Disc two

13. In Your Room
14. I Feel You
15. Policy of Truth
16. Enjoy the Silence
17. Never Let Me Down Again
18. Stripped
19. Master and Servant
20. Strangelove
21. Personal Jesus
22. Waiting for the Night

=== Slavia Stadium, Prague, Czech Republic ===
Concert on 25 June 2009.

Track listing

Disc one

1. In Chains
2. Wrong
3. Hole to Feed
4. Walking in My Shoes
5. It's No Good
6. A Question of Time
7. Precious
8. Fly on the Windscreen
9. Little Soul
10. Home
11. Come Back
12. Peace

Disc two

13. In Your Room
14. I Feel You
15. Policy of Truth
16. Enjoy the Silence
17. Never Let Me Down Again
18. Stripped
19. Master and Servant
20. Strangelove
21. Personal Jesus
22. Waiting for the Night

=== Stade de France, Paris, France ===
Concert on 27 June 2009.

Track listing

Disc one

1. In Chains
2. Wrong
3. Hole to Feed
4. Walking in My Shoes
5. It's No Good
6. A Question of Time
7. Precious
8. Fly on the Windscreen
9. Little Soul
10. Home
11. Come Back
12. Peace

Disc two

13. In Your Room
14. I Feel You
15. Policy of Truth
16. Enjoy the Silence
17. Never Let Me Down Again
18. Stripped
19. Master and Servant
20. Strangelove
21. Personal Jesus
22. Waiting for the Night

=== Zénith Amphitheatre, Nancy, France ===
Concert on 28 June 2009.

Track listing

Disc one

1. In Chains
2. Wrong
3. Hole to Feed
4. Walking in My Shoes
5. It's No Good
6. A Question of Time
7. Precious
8. Fly on the Windscreen
9. Little Soul
10. Home
11. Come Back
12. Peace

Disc two

13. In Your Room
14. I Feel You
15. Policy of Truth
16. Enjoy the Silence
17. Never Let Me Down Again
18. Stripped
19. Master and Servant
20. Strangelove
21. Personal Jesus
22. Waiting for the Night

=== Parken Stadium, Copenhagen, Denmark ===
Concert on 30 June 2009.

Track listing

Disc one

1. In Chains
2. Wrong
3. Hole to Feed
4. Walking in My Shoes
5. It's No Good
6. A Question of Time
7. Precious
8. Fly on the Windscreen
9. Little Soul
10. Home
11. Come Back
12. Peace

Disc two

13. In Your Room
14. I Feel You
15. Policy of Truth
16. Enjoy the Silence
17. Never Let Me Down Again
18. Stripped
19. Master and Servant
20. Strangelove
21. Personal Jesus
22. Waiting for the Night

=== HSH Nordbank Arena, Hamburg, Germany ===
Concert on 1 July 2009.

Track listing

Disc one

1. In Chains
2. Wrong
3. Hole to Feed
4. Walking in My Shoes
5. It's No Good
6. A Question of Time
7. Precious
8. Fly on the Windscreen
9. Little Soul
10. Home
11. Come Back
12. Peace

Disc two

13. In Your Room
14. I Feel You
15. Policy of Truth
16. Enjoy the Silence
17. Never Let Me Down Again
18. Stripped
19. Master and Servant
20. Strangelove
21. Personal Jesus
22. Waiting for the Night

=== Arvika Festival, Arvika, Sweden ===
Concert on 3 July 2009.

Track listing

Disc one

1. In Chains
2. Wrong
3. Hole to Feed
4. Walking in My Shoes
5. It's No Good
6. A Question of Time
7. Precious
8. Fly on the Windscreen
9. Home

Disc two

10. Come Back
11. Peace
12. In Your Room
13. I Feel You
14. Enjoy the Silence
15. Never Let Me Down Again
16. Stripped
17. Personal Jesus

=== Esplanade Gambetta, Carcassonne, France ===
Concert on 6 July 2009.

Track listing

Disc one

1. In Chains
2. Wrong
3. Hole to Feed
4. Walking in My Shoes
5. It's No Good
6. A Question of Time
7. Precious
8. Fly on the Windscreen
9. Little Soul
10. Home
11. Come Back
12. Peace

Disc two

13. In Your Room
14. I Feel You
15. Policy of Truth
16. Enjoy the Silence
17. Never Let Me Down Again
18. Stripped
19. Master and Servant
20. Strangelove
21. Personal Jesus
22. Waiting for the Night

=== Estadio José Zorrilla, Valladolid, Spain ===
Concert on 8 July 2009.

Track listing

Disc one

1. In Chains
2. Wrong
3. Hole to Feed
4. Walking in My Shoes
5. It's No Good
6. A Question of Time
7. Precious
8. Fly on the Windscreen
9. Little Soul
10. Home
11. Come Back
12. Peace

Disc two

13. In Your Room
14. I Feel You
15. Policy of Truth
16. Enjoy the Silence
17. Never Let Me Down Again
18. Stripped
19. Master and Servant
20. Strangelove
21. Personal Jesus
22. Waiting for the Night

=== Bilbao Live Festival, Bilbao, Spain ===
Concert on 9 July 2009.

Track listing

Disc one

1. In Chains
2. Wrong
3. Hole to Feed
4. Walking in My Shoes
5. It's No Good
6. A Question of Time
7. Precious
8. Fly on the Windscreen
9. Home

Disc two

10. Come Back
11. Peace
12. In Your Room
13. I Feel You
14. Enjoy the Silence
15. Never Let Me Down Again
16. Stripped
17. Personal Jesus

=== Molson Amphitheater, Toronto, Canada ===
Concert on 24 July 2009.

Track listing

Disc one

1. In Chains
2. Wrong
3. Hole to Feed
4. Walking in My Shoes
5. It's No Good
6. A Question of Time
7. Precious
8. Fly on the Windscreen
9. Little Soul
10. Home
11. Come Back

Disc two

12. Fragile Tension
13. In Your Room
14. I Feel You
15. Policy of Truth
16. Enjoy the Silence
17. Never Let Me Down Again
18. Stripped
19. Master and Servant
20. Strangelove
21. Personal Jesus
22. Waiting for the Night

=== Bell Centre, Montreal, Canada ===
Concert on 25 July 2009.

Track listing

Disc one

1. In Chains
2. Wrong
3. Hole to Feed
4. Walking in My Shoes
5. It's No Good
6. A Question of Time
7. Precious
8. Fly on the Windscreen
9. Little Soul
10. Home

Disc two

11. Come Back
12. Policy of Truth
13. In Your Room
14. I Feel You
15. Enjoy the Silence
16. Never Let Me Down Again
17. Stripped
18. Master and Servant
19. Strangelove
20. Personal Jesus
21. Waiting for the Night

=== Nissan Pavilion, Washington D. C., United States ===
Concert on 28 July 2009.

Track listing

Disc one

1. In Chains
2. Wrong
3. Hole to Feed
4. Walking in My Shoes
5. It's No Good
6. A Question of Time
7. Precious
8. Fly on the Windscreen
9. Little Soul
10. Home

Disc two

11. Come Back
12. Policy of Truth
13. In Your Room
14. I Feel You
15. Enjoy the Silence
16. Never Let Me Down Again
17. Stripped
18. Master and Servant
19. Strangelove
20. Personal Jesus
21. Waiting for the Night

=== Comcast Center, Boston, United States ===
Concert on 31 July 2009.

Track listing

Disc one

1. In Chains
2. Wrong
3. Hole to Feed
4. Walking in My Shoes
5. It's No Good
6. A Question of Time
7. Precious
8. Fly on the Windscreen
9. Little Soul
10. Home

Disc two

11. Come Back
12. Policy of Truth
13. In Your Room
14. I Feel You
15. Enjoy the Silence
16. Never Let Me Down Again
17. Stripped
18. Master and Servant
19. Strangelove
20. Personal Jesus

=== The Borgata, Atlantic City, United States ===
Concert on 1 August 2009.

Track listing

Disc one

1. In Chains
2. Wrong
3. Hole to Feed
4. Walking in My Shoes
5. It's No Good
6. A Question of Time
7. Precious
8. Fly on the Windscreen

Disc two

9. Jezebel
10. A Question of Lust
11. Come Back
12. Policy of Truth
13. In Your Room
14. I Feel You
15. Enjoy the Silence
16. Never Let Me Down Again
17. Stripped
18. Personal Jesus

=== KeyArena, Seattle, United States ===
Concert on 10 August 2009.

Track listing

Disc one

1. In Chains
2. Wrong
3. Hole to Feed
4. Walking in My Shoes
5. It's No Good
6. A Question of Time
7. Precious
8. Fly on the Windscreen
9. Jezebel
10. Home

Disc two

11. Come Back
12. Policy of Truth
13. In Your Room
14. I Feel You
15. Enjoy the Silence
16. Never Let Me Down Again
17. Stripped
18. Master and Servant
19. Strangelove
20. Personal Jesus
21. Waiting for the Night

=== Honda Center, Anaheim, United States ===
Concert on 19 August 2009.

Track listing

Disc one

1. In Chains
2. Wrong
3. Hole to Feed
4. Walking in My Shoes
5. It's No Good
6. A Question of Time
7. Precious
8. Fly on the Windscreen
9. Jezebel
10. Home

Disc two

11. Come Back
12. Policy of Truth
13. In Your Room
14. I Feel You
15. Enjoy the Silence
16. Never Let Me Down Again
17. Somebody
18. Stripped
19. Behind the Wheel
20. Personal Jesus
21. Waiting for the Night

=== Pearl Concert Theater, Paradise, Nevada, United States ===
Concert on 22 August 2009.

Track listing

Disc one

1. In Chains
2. Wrong
3. Hole to Feed
4. Walking in My Shoes
5. It's No Good
6. A Question of Time
7. Precious
8. Fly on the Windscreen
9. Jezebel
10. A Question of Lust

Disc two

11. Miles Away/The Truth is
12. Policy of Truth
13. In Your Room
14. I Feel You
15. Enjoy the Silence
16. Never Let Me Down Again
17. Shake the Disease
18. Stripped
19. Strangelove
20. Personal Jesus

=== US Airways Center, Phoenix, United States ===
Concert on 23 August 2009.

Track listing

Disc one

1. In Chains
2. Wrong
3. Hole to Feed
4. Walking in My Shoes
5. It's No Good
6. A Question of Time
7. Precious
8. Fly on the Windscreen
9. Little Soul
10. Home

Disc two

11. Miles Away/The Truth is
12. Policy of Truth
13. In Your Room
14. I Feel You
15. Enjoy the Silence
16. Never Let Me Down Again
17. Somebody
18. Stripped
19. Behind the Wheel
20. Personal Jesus
21. Waiting for the Night

=== E Center, Salt Lake City, United States ===
Concert on 25 August 2009.

Track listing

1. In Chains
2. Wrong
3. Hole to Feed
4. Walking in My Shoes
5. It's No Good
6. A Question of Time
7. Precious
8. Fly on the Windscreen
9. Jezebel
10. A Question of Lust
11. Miles Away/The Truth is
12. Policy of Truth
13. In Your Room
14. I Feel You
15. Enjoy the Silence
16. Never Let Me Down Again
17. Shake the Disease
18. Stripped
19. Strangelove
20. Personal Jesus
21. Waiting for the Night

=== Red Rocks, Denver, United States ===
Concert on 27 August 2009.

Track listing

1. In Chains
2. Wrong
3. Hole to Feed
4. Walking in My Shoes
5. It's No Good
6. A Question of Time
7. Precious
8. Fly on the Windscreen
9. Jezebel
10. Home
11. Miles Away/The Truth is
12. Policy of Truth
13. In Your Room
14. I Feel You
15. Enjoy the Silence
16. Never Let Me Down Again
17. Somebody
18. Stripped
19. Behind the Wheel
20. Personal Jesus
21. Waiting for the Night

=== Superpages.com Center, Dallas, United States ===
Concert on 29 August 2009.

Track listing

Disc one

1. In Chains
2. Wrong
3. Hole to Feed
4. Walking in My Shoes
5. It's No Good
6. A Question of Time
7. Precious
8. Fly on the Windscreen
9. Jezebel
10. Judas

Disc two

11. Miles Away/The Truth is
12. Policy of Truth
13. In Your Room
14. I Feel You
15. Enjoy the Silence
16. Never Let Me Down Again
17. Somebody
18. Stripped
19. Behind the Wheel
20. Personal Jesus
21. Waiting for the Night

=== Woodlands Pavilion, Houston, United States ===
Concert on 30 August 2009.

Track listing

Disc one

1. In Chains
2. Wrong
3. Hole to Feed
4. Walking in My Shoes
5. It's No Good
6. A Question of Time
7. Precious
8. Fly on the Windscreen
9. Little Soul
10. Home

Disc two

11. Miles Away/The Truth is
12. Policy of Truth
13. In Your Room
14. I Feel You
15. Enjoy the Silence
16. Never Let Me Down Again
17. A Question of Lust
18. Stripped
19. Behind the Wheel
20. Personal Jesus
21. Waiting for the Night

=== Lakewood Amphitheater, Atlanta, United States ===
Concert on 1 September 2009.

Track listing

Disc one

1. In Chains
2. Wrong
3. Hole to Feed
4. Walking in My Shoes
5. It's No Good
6. A Question of Time
7. Precious
8. Fly on the Windscreen
9. Jezebel
10. Home

Disc two

11. Miles Away/The Truth is
12. Policy of Truth
13. In Your Room
14. I Feel You
15. Enjoy the Silence
16. Never Let Me Down Again
17. Somebody
18. Stripped
19. Behind the Wheel
20. Personal Jesus
21. Waiting for the Night

=== Ford Amphitheater, Tampa, United States ===
Concert on 4 September 2009.

Track listing

Disc one

1. In Chains
2. Wrong
3. Hole to Feed
4. Walking in My Shoes
5. It's No Good
6. A Question of Time
7. Precious
8. Fly on the Windscreen
9. Jezebel
10. Home

Disc two

11. Miles Away/The Truth is
12. Policy of Truth
13. In Your Room
14. I Feel You
15. Enjoy the Silence
16. Never Let Me Down Again
17. Somebody
18. Stripped
19. Behind the Wheel
20. Personal Jesus
21. Waiting for the Night

=== BankAtlantic Center, Ft. Lauderdale, United States ===
Concert on 5 September 2009.

Track listing

Disc one

1. In Chains
2. Wrong
3. Hole to Feed
4. Walking in My Shoes
5. It's No Good
6. A Question of Time
7. Precious
8. Fly on the Windscreen
9. Little Soul
10. A Question of Lust

Disc two

11. Miles Away/The Truth is
12. Policy of Truth
13. In Your Room
14. I Feel You
15. Enjoy the Silence
16. Never Let Me Down Again
17. Shake the Disease
18. Stripped
19. Behind the Wheel
20. Personal Jesus

=== Arena VFG, Guadalajara, Mexico ===
Concert on 1 October 2009.

Track listing

Disc one

1. In Chains
2. Wrong
3. Hole to Feed
4. Walking in My Shoes
5. It's No Good
6. A Question of Time
7. Precious
8. Fly on the Windscreen
9. Jezebel
10. Home

Disc two

11. Miles Away/The Truth is
12. Policy of Truth
13. In Your Room
14. I Feel You
15. Enjoy the Silence
16. Never Let Me Down Again
17. Somebody
18. Stripped
19. Behind the Wheel
20. Personal Jesus
21. Waiting for the Night

=== Foro Sol, Mexico City, Mexico ===
Concert on 3 October 2009.

Track listing

Disc one

1. In Chains
2. Wrong
3. Hole to Feed
4. Walking in My Shoes
5. It's No Good
6. A Question of Time
7. Precious
8. Fly on the Windscreen
9. Jezebel
10. Home

Disc two

11. Miles Away/The Truth is
12. Policy of Truth
13. In Your Room
14. I Feel You
15. Enjoy the Silence
16. Never Let Me Down Again
17. Somebody
18. Stripped
19. Behind the Wheel
20. Personal Jesus
21. Waiting for the Night

=== Foro Sol, Mexico City, Mexico ===
Concert on 4 October 2009.

Track listing

Disc one

1. In Chains
2. Wrong
3. Hole to Feed
4. Walking in My Shoes
5. It's No Good
6. A Question of Time
7. Precious
8. Fly on the Windscreen
9. Little Soul
10. A Question of Lust

Disc two

11. Come Back
12. Policy of Truth
13. In Your Room
14. I Feel You
15. Enjoy the Silence
16. Never Let Me Down Again
17. Shake the Disease
18. Stripped
19. Behind the Wheel
20. Personal Jesus
21. Waiting for the Night

=== Monterrey Arena, Monterrey, Mexico ===
Concert on 6 October 2009.

Track listing

Disc one

1. In Chains
2. Wrong
3. Hole to Feed
4. Walking in My Shoes
5. It's No Good
6. A Question of Time
7. Precious
8. Fly on the Windscreen
9. Jezebel
10. Home

Disc two

11. Miles Away/The Truth is
12. Policy of Truth
13. In Your Room
14. I Feel You
15. Enjoy the Silence
16. Never Let Me Down Again
17. Somebody
18. Stripped
19. Behind the Wheel
20. Personal Jesus
21. Waiting for the Night

=== SECC, Glasgow, Scotland ===
Concert on 12 December 2009.

Track listing

Disc one

1. In Chains
2. Wrong
3. Hole to Feed
4. Walking in My Shoes
5. It's No Good
6. A Question of Time
7. Precious
8. World in My Eyes
9. Insight
10. Home

Disc two

11. Miles Away/The Truth is
12. Policy of Truth
13. In Your Room
14. I Feel You
15. Enjoy the Silence
16. Never Let Me Down Again
17. One Caress
18. Stripped
19. Behind the Wheel
20. Personal Jesus

=== LG Arena, Birmingham, England ===
Concert on 13 December 2009.

Track listing

Disc one

1. In Chains
2. Wrong
3. Hole to Feed
4. Walking in My Shoes
5. It's No Good
6. A Question of Time
7. Precious
8. World in My Eyes
9. Insight
10. Home

Disc two

11. Miles Away/The Truth is
12. Policy of Truth
13. In Your Room
14. I Feel You
15. Enjoy the Silence
16. Never Let Me Down Again
17. Dressed in Black
18. Stripped
19. Behind the Wheel
20. Personal Jesus

=== O2 Arena, London, England ===
Concert on 15 December 2009.

Track listing

Disc one

1. In Chains
2. Wrong
3. Hole to Feed
4. Walking in My Shoes
5. It's No Good
6. A Question of Time
7. Precious
8. World in My Eyes
9. Insight
10. Home

Disc two

11. Miles Away/The Truth is
12. Policy of Truth
13. In Your Room
14. I Feel You
15. Enjoy the Silence
16. Never Let Me Down Again
17. One Caress
18. Stripped
19. Behind the Wheel
20. Personal Jesus

=== O2 Arena, London, England ===
Concert on 16 December 2009.

Track listing

Disc one

1. In Chains
2. Wrong
3. Hole to Feed
4. Walking in My Shoes
5. It's No Good
6. A Question of Time
7. Precious
8. World in My Eyes
9. Judas
10. Home

Disc two

11. Miles Away/The Truth is
12. Policy of Truth
13. In Your Room
14. I Feel You
15. Enjoy the Silence
16. Never Let Me Down Again
17. Dressed in Black
18. Stripped
19. Behind the Wheel
20. Personal Jesus

=== MEN, Manchester, England ===
Concert on 18 December 2009.

Track listing

Disc one

1. In Chains
2. Wrong
3. Hole to Feed
4. Walking in My Shoes
5. It's No Good
6. A Question of Time
7. Precious
8. World in My Eyes
9. Insight
10. Home

Disc two

11. Miles Away/The Truth is
12. Policy of Truth
13. In Your Room
14. I Feel You
15. Enjoy the Silence
16. Never Let Me Down Again
17. One Caress
18. Stripped
19. Behind the Wheel
20. Personal Jesus

=== Royal Albert Hall (Concert for Teenage Cancer Trust), London, England ===
Concert on 17 February 2010

Track listing

Disc one

1. In Chains
2. Wrong
3. Hole to Feed
4. Walking in My Shoes
5. It's No Good
6. A Question of Time
7. Precious
8. World in My Eyes
9. One Caress
10. Home

Disc two

11. Come Back
12. Policy of Truth
13. In Your Room
14. I Feel You
15. Enjoy the Silence
16. Never Let Me Down Again
17. Somebody (feat. Alan Wilder)
18. Stripped
19. Photographic
20. Personal Jesus

=== O2 Arena, London, England ===
Concert on 20 February 2010.

Track listing

Disc one

1. In Chains
2. Wrong
3. Hole to Feed
4. Walking in My Shoes
5. It's No Good
6. A Question of Time
7. Precious
8. World in My Eyes
9. Freelove
10. Home

Disc two

11. Miles Away/The Truth is
12. Policy of Truth
13. In Your Room
14. I Feel You
15. Enjoy the Silence
16. Never Let Me Down Again
17. A Question of Lust
18. Stripped
19. Behind the Wheel
20. Personal Jesus

=== LTU arena, Düsseldorf, Germany ===
Concert on 26 February 2010.

Track listing

Disc one

1. In Chains
2. Wrong
3. Hole to Feed
4. Walking in My Shoes
5. It's No Good
6. A Question of Time
7. Precious
8. World in My Eyes
9. Insight
10. Home

Disc two

11. Miles Away/The Truth is
12. Policy of Truth
13. In Your Room
14. I Feel You
15. Enjoy the Silence
16. Never Let Me Down Again
17. Dressed in Black
18. Stripped
19. Behind the Wheel
20. Personal Jesus

=== LTU arena, Düsseldorf, Germany ===
Concert on 27 February 2010.

Track listing

Disc one

1. In Chains
2. Wrong
3. Hole to Feed
4. Walking in My Shoes
5. It's No Good
6. A Question of Time
7. Precious
8. World in My Eyes
9. One Caress
10. Home

Disc two

11. Miles Away/The Truth is
12. Policy of Truth
13. In Your Room
14. I Feel You
15. Enjoy the Silence
16. Never Let Me Down Again
17. Somebody
18. Stripped
19. Photographic
20. Personal Jesus
