= Muzikizum =

2002 album by X-Press 2

Studio album by X-Press 2
- Released: 22 April 2002
- Genre: Electronic; house
- Length: 61:33
- Label: Skint Records
- Producer: X-Press 2

X-Press 2 chronology
Muzikizum (2002)	Makeshift Feelgood (2006)

Singles from Muzikizum
- 1. "AC/DC" Released: 2000; 2. "Muzikizum" Released: 2001; 3. "Smoke Machine" Released: 2001; 4. "Lazy" Released: 2002; 5. "I Want You Back" Released: 2002

Muzikizum is the debut studio album by X-Press 2. It was released on Skint Records in 2002. It features vocal contributions from David Byrne, Dieter Meier, and Steve Edwards. It peaked at number 15 on the UK Albums Chart.

== Critical reception ==
Professional ratings
Aggregate scores
Source	Rating
Metacritic	75/100
Review scores
Source	Rating
AllMusic	3/5 stars
Alternative Press	4/5 stars
Dotmusic	5/5 stars
The Guardian	4/5 stars
Mojo	4.5/5 stars
NME	6/10
Playlouder	4/5 stars
Q	3/5 stars
Rolling Stone	3/5 stars
Uncut	4/5 stars

At Metacritic, which assigns a weighted average score out of 100 to reviews from mainstream critics, the album received an average score of 75, based on 10 reviews, indicating "generally favorable reviews".

John Bush of AllMusic wrote, "Muzikizum is informed by a slim, spare aesthetic that sounds more 1992 than 2002, evoking simply produced, imperial-sounding tracks from Spooky and Leftfield; in other words, the glory days of progressive house." Gary Mulholland of The Guardian commented that "Brighton club veterans Rocky, Diesel and Ashley Beedle seamlessly blend slick-but-tough pop with your full-on Ibiza-friendly house instrumental."

== Track listing ==
No.	Title	Writer(s)	Length
1.	"Muzikizum"	X-Press 2	6:43
2.	"Supasong"	X-Press 2	5:05
3.	"Lazy" (featuring David Byrne)	X-Press 2; David Byrne	6:58
4.	"Angel"	X-Press 2; Ralf Hertwig; Tommi Eckart	6:24
5.	"Palenque"	X-Press 2	3:55
6.	"Smoke Machine"	X-Press 2	7:56
7.	"I Want You Back" (featuring Dieter Meier)	X-Press 2; Dieter Meier	6:14
8.	"Call That Love" (featuring Steve Edwards)	X-Press 2; Steve Edwards; Simon Thornton	6:03
9.	"AC/DC"	X-Press 2	6:39
10.	"The Ending"	X-Press 2; Neal Howard	5:34
Total length:			61:33

== Personnel ==
Credits adapted from liner notes.

- X-Press 2 – arrangement, production, art direction, design
- David Byrne – vocals (on "Lazy")
- Dieter Meier – vocals (on "I Want You Back")
- Steve Edwards – vocals (on "Call That Love")
- Pete Z – keyboards (on "Lazy", "Call That Love", and "The Ending")
- James Brown – engineering, mixing
- Adam Wren – mixing (except "AC/DC" and "The Ending")
- Simon Thornton – editing (on "Supasong")
- Tom Hingston – art direction, design
- Hamish Brown – photography
- Jason Evans – photography

== Charts ==
Chart	Peak position
UK Albums (OCC)	15
