= Certain Things Are Likely =

Single by Kissing the Pink

from the album Certain Things Are Likely
- Released: March 1987
- Studio: Eastcote Studios (London)
- Genre: Dance-pop; electronic
- Length: 4:13
- Label: Magnet
- Songwriter: KTP
- Producers: KTP; Peter Walsh

Kissing the Pink singles chronology
"Never Too Late to Love You" (1986)	"Certain Things Are Likely" (1987)	"Stand Up (Get Down)" (1988)

"Certain Things Are Likely" is a song by the English band Kissing the Pink, released as both a 7" and 12" single from their studio album of the same name. Produced by the band and Peter Walsh, "Certain Things Are Likely" was released as the third single from the album, and was the most successful of their three entries on Billboard's Dance Club Songs chart, peaking at No. 1 for three weeks in May 1987. The song also made the Billboard Hot 100, peaking at No. 97 on the 13th of June, 1987.

== Track listing ==
7" single

1. "Certain Things Are Likely (Remix Edit)"
2. "Certain Things Are Likely (Garage Edit)"

12" single

1. "Certain Things Are Likely (Garage)"
2. "Certain Things Are Likely (Garage Dub)"
3. "Certain Things Are Likely (Original Mix)"
4. "Certain Things Are Likely (Instrumental)"

== Chart performance ==
Chart	Position
US Billboard Hot 100	97
US Dance Club Songs (Billboard)	1

== In film ==
- "Certain Things Are Likely" can be heard in the American teen romantic comedy film, Can't Buy Me Love (1987).
- It can also be heard in the Italian giallo film Too Beautiful to Die (1988)

== See also ==
- List of Billboard number-one dance singles of 1987
