= One Step (Kissing the Pink song) =

Single by Kissing the Pink

from the album Certain Things Are Likely
- Released: February 1986 (UK); September 1986 (US)
- Studio: Unison Studios (Munich)
- Genre: Dance-pop; electronic
- Length: 4:29
- Label: Magnet
- Songwriter: KTP
- Producer: Peter Walsh

Kissing the Pink singles chronology
"The Other Side of Heaven" (1984)	"One Step" (1986)	"Never Too Late to Love You" (1986)

Music video
- "One Step" on YouTube

"One Step" is a song by the English band Kissing the Pink, released as both a 7" and 12" single from their third studio album, Certain Things Are Likely (1986). Produced by Peter Walsh, "One Step" was released as the lead single from the album, peaking at No. 79 on the UK Singles Chart, and No. 5 on Billboard's Dance Club Songs chart in November 1986. It also reached the Top 40 in Belgium, Italy and the Netherlands. The single features two tracks from their previous studio album What Noise (1984), "The Rain It Never Stops" and "Footsteps" as its B-side.

Despite the song's relative lack of success in the UK, it was performed on Top of the Pops.

== Track listing ==
7" single

1. "One Step"
2. "Footsteps"

12" single

1. "One Step"
2. "The Rain It Never Stops"
3. "Footsteps"

== Chart performance ==
Chart	Position
Belgium (Ultratop 50 Flanders)	23
Netherlands (Dutch Top 40)	25
Italy (Musica e dischi)	3
UK Singles (Official Charts)	79
US Dance Club Songs (Billboard)	5
