= Love Lasts Forever (Kissing the Pink song) =

Single by Kissing the Pink

from the album Naked
- Released: 1983
- Studio: AIR (London)
- Length: 5:38
- Label: Magnet
- Songwriter: Kissing the Pink
- Producer: Peter Walsh

Kissing the Pink singles chronology
"The Last Film" (1983)	"Love Lasts Forever" (1983)	"Maybe This Day" (1983)

Official audio
- "Love Lasts Forever" on YouTube

"Love Lasts Forever" is a song by the English new wave and synth-pop band Kissing the Pink, released as both a 7" and 12" single from their debut studio album, Naked (1983). Produced by Peter Walsh, "Love Lasts Forever" was the follow-up single to their Top 20 hit "The Last Film", but it only peaked at No. 85 on the UK singles chart. The single features an instrumental version of the non-album track, "Underage" as its B-side.

== Track listing ==
7" single

1. "Love Lasts Forever"
2. "Underage (Instrumental Version)"

12" single

1. "Love Lasts Forever"
2. "Underage (Extended Instrumental Version)"

== Chart performance ==
Chart	Position
UK Singles (Official Charts)	85
