= Peace Division =

British house music duo

Peace Division is a house music and remix duo, comprising Clive Henry and Justin Drake.

The duo have released EPs, remixes, and singles on Kickin Records, Eukahouse, Hooj Choons, Proletkult, Low Pressings, Junior, and NRK Sound Division among others. Peace Division have also produced remixes for a wide variety of music artists including Moby, Superchumbo and Yothu Yindi. Peace Division got its name from a UN peace keeping force.

Justin Drake is the engineer of the duo and Clive Henry gained experience as a member of the Flying Records crew DJing at the Gosh and The Bone parties in London.

Clive Henry started the Low Pressings label with X-Press 2 member/collaborator and long time friend Rocky. The Peace Division single "Body & Soul" sold over 12,000 copies worldwide on vinyl and their debut album Junkyard Funk was released in 2000.
