= The Last Film =

Single by Kissing the Pink

from the album Naked
- B-side: "Shine"
- Released: 1983
- Studio: AIR Studios (London)
- Genre: Synth-pop; electronic
- Length: 3:29
- Label: Magnet
- Songwriter(s): Kissing the Pink
- Producer(s): Colin Thurston

Kissing the Pink singles chronology
"Watching Their Eyes" (1982)	"The Last Film" (1983)	"Love Lasts Forever" (1983)

"The Last Film" is a song by the English new wave and synth-pop band Kissing the Pink, released as both a 7" and 12" single from their debut studio album, Naked (1983).

Their only Top 20 hit, it peaked at No. 19 on the UK singles chart. The single features the non-album track, "Shine" as its B-side.

Sylvia Griffin sang the middle eight but left the group whilst they were still recording the rest of the album.

When lead vocalist Nick Whitecross was asked about the lyrics to the song he said that they were "just about a soldier who sat in a tent watching one of those '40s or '50s Hollywood war films just before he’s about to go out and fight for real. It's not controversial, war is horrible and unglamorous".

== Track listing ==
7" single

1. "The Last Film"
2. "Shine"

12" single

1. "The Last Film (Extended Version)"
2. "Shine"
3. "The Last Film (The Hymn Version)"

== Chart performance ==
Chart	Position
UK Singles (OCC)	19
