= Lazy (X-Press 2 song) =

2002 single by X-Press 2

Single by X-Press 2 featuring David Byrne

from the album Muzikizum
- B-side: "AC/DC"
- Released: 8 April 2002
- Studio: Rocksteady (London, England)
- Genre: Deep house
- Length: 6:58 (album version); 4:17 (radio edit)
- Label: Skint; Columbia
- Songwriters: X-Press 2; David Byrne
- Producer: X-Press 2

X-Press 2 singles chronology
"Smoke Machine" (2001)	"Lazy" (2002)	"I Want You Back" (2002)

"Lazy" is a single by the British house duo X-Press 2, featuring vocals from David Byrne, released on 8 April 2002 through Skint Records. It was written and produced by X-Press 2 and co-written by Byrne.

"Lazy" reached number two on the UK singles chart and spent four weeks in the UK top 10. "Lazy" won the Ivors Dance Award at the Ivor Novello Awards in 2003. Byrne included an orchestral version on his 2004 solo album Grown Backwards, and performed it during his 2018 American Utopia tour.

== Recording ==
David Byrne initially approached X-Press 2 to ask them to be his backing band, but they declined, saying, "We had to tell him we're just a bunch of studio gits." Byrne told Drowned in Sound: "I love the idea of a throbbing beat, and a dancefloor filled with energised bodies, and the singer proclaiming the merits of laziness."

Byrne recorded his vocals at his home in New York City and emailed them to X-Press 2. Darren Rock of X-Press 2 said: "We put it through the mixing desk. Our music coming out of one side, all his stuff coming out of the other side. We were all there like, 'Oh my god'. At points, he's clucking like a chicken on there, at other points there are these mad organ noises that didn't fit at all. It was so out there. Just nuts." Byrne released an orchestral version on his 2004 album Grown Backwards.

== Critical reception ==
Writing in The Guardian, Gary Mullholland called the song "a cheery dance-pop record". Helen Brown of The Daily Telegraph praised it as a "glorious dancefloor collaboration". Drowned in Sound's Jon Smith said: "Catchy, funny and anthemic, if we're lucky this could be the sound of the summer. For those of us who had written off the singles chart as irrelevant, this is a welcome reminder that there's life in the old dog yet." "Lazy" won the Ivors Dance Award at the Ivor Novello Awards in 2003.

== Music video ==
The music video was directed by Howard Shur. It features a man played by Bob Stephenson who has created a series of contraptions that enable him to go through his daily routine without moving.

== Live performances ==
During a performance on Top of the Pops, Byrne sang while X-Press 2 sat on a bunk bed and at a desk. Byrne performed "Lazy" during his 2018 American Utopia tour.

== Track listings ==
UK CD single

1. "Lazy" (radio edit)
2. "Lazy" (original)
3. "Lazy" (Norman Cook remix)
4. "Lazy" (enhanced video)

UK 12-inch single

A1. "Lazy" (original mix)
AA1. "Lazy" (acapella)
AA2. "Lazy" (reprise)

UK 12-inch single (remixes)

A1. "Lazy" (Norman Cook remix)
A2. "Lazy" (radio edit)
AA1. "Lazy" (Peace Division dub)

European CD single

1. "Lazy" (radio edit)
2. "Lazy" (Norman Cook remix)

Australian CD single

1. "Lazy" (radio edit)
2. "Lazy" (original)
3. "Lazy" (Norman Cook remix)

US maxi-CD single

1. "Lazy" (original) – 9:26
2. "Lazy" (Norman Cook remix) – 6:18
3. "Lazy" (Norman Cook dub) – 6:42
4. "Lazy" (Peace Division dub) – 9:20
5. "AC/DC" (Gangbanger mix) – 9:26

== Credits and personnel ==
Credits are adapted from the European CD single liner notes.

Studios

- Recorded at Rocksteady Studio (London, England)
- Mixed at Rollover Studios (London, England)

Personnel

- X-Press 2 – writing, production, arrangement, art direction
- David Byrne – writing, vocals, arrangement
- Pete Z. – keyboards
- James Brown – engineering, mixing
- Adam Wren – mixing
- Tom Hingston Studio – art direction, design
- Jason Evans – photography

== Charts ==
=== Weekly charts ===
Chart (2002)	Peak position
Australia (ARIA)	52
Belgium (Ultratip Bubbling Under Flanders)	2
Europe (Eurochart Hot 100)	19
Ireland (IRMA)	15
Ireland Dance (IRMA)	1
Italy (FIMI)	37
Netherlands (Dutch Top 40 Tipparade)	7
Netherlands (Single Top 100)	78
New Zealand (Recorded Music NZ)	31
Scottish Singles Sales (Official Charts)	4
UK Singles (Official Charts)	2
UK Dance (Official Charts)	1
UK Indie (Official Charts)	1
US Dance Club Play (Billboard)	1

=== Year-end charts ===
Chart (2002)	Position
UK Singles (OCC)	58

== Certifications ==
Region	Certification	Certified units/sales
United Kingdom (BPI)	Silver	200,000^{‡}
^{‡} Sales+streaming figures based on certification alone.

== Release history ==
Region	Date	Format(s)	Label(s)	Ref.
United Kingdom	8 April 2002	12-inch vinyl; CD	Skint	
Australia	15 April 2002	CD	Skint	
New Zealand	27 May 2002	CD	Skint	

== See also ==
- List of UK top 10 singles in 2002
- List of UK Dance Singles Chart number ones of 2002
- List of UK Independent Singles Chart number ones of 2002
