= Maybe This Day =

Single by Kissing the Pink

from the album Naked
- Released: 1983
- Studio: AIR (London)
- Genre: New wave
- Length: 3:38
- Label: Magnet (UK); Atlantic (US)
- Songwriter(s): Kissing the Pink
- Producer(s): Colin Thurston

Kissing the Pink singles chronology
| "Love Lasts Forever" (1983) | "Maybe This Day" (1983) | "Big Man Restless" (1983) |

Music video
- Maybe This Day on YouTube

"Maybe This Day" is a song by the English new wave band Kissing the Pink, released as both a 7" and 12" single from their debut studio album, Naked (1983). The single was released by Magnet Records in the UK, and Atlantic Records in the US, it peaked at No. 83 on the UK Singles Chart, and No. 87 on the US Billboard Hot 100 (their first entry on that chart). The UK single features the non-album tracks, "Middleton Row" and a special club mix of "We Are Your Family" as its B-side, while the US single contains the non-album track, "Garden Parties".

A music video for the song was also made, shot and filmed in various areas of London and inside of a hotel and a nightclub.

== Track listing ==
7" single

1. "Maybe This Day"
2. "Middleton Row"

12" single

1. "Maybe This Day"
2. "We Are Your Family (Special Club Version)"
3. "Middleton Row"

== Chart performance ==
| Chart | Position |
|---|---|
| UK Singles (OCC) | 83 |
| US Billboard Hot 100 | 87 |
