= A Question of Time =

Single by Depeche Mode

from the album Black Celebration
- B-side: "Black Celebration" (live)
- Released: 11 August 1986
- Recorded: November 1985 – February 1986
- Studio: Westside (London); Hansa Mischraum (Berlin)
- Genre: Synth-pop; industrial
- Length: 4:04 (7″ single version); 6:38 (12″ version)
- Label: Mute
- Songwriter: Martin L. Gore
- Producers: Depeche Mode; Gareth Jones; Daniel Miller

Depeche Mode singles chronology
"A Question of Lust" (1986)	"A Question of Time" (1986)	"But Not Tonight" (1986)

Music video
- "A Question of Time" on YouTube

"A Question of Time" is a song by the English electronic band Depeche Mode, released on 11 August 1986 in the UK as the third and final single from their fifth studio album, Black Celebration, following the similarly titled "A Question of Lust".

The single was a top 20 hit in several European countries. The accompanying music video was the beginning of a long collaboration between Depeche Mode and Anton Corbijn.

== Background and recording ==
Depeche Mode had entered the studio to record tracks for their album Black Celebration in November 1985, with recording of all album tracks starting at Westside Studios in London and final production and mixing moving to Hansa Studios in West Berlin by early 1986.

== Release and promotion ==
Depeche Mode released Black Celebration in mid-March 1986, and "A Question of Time" was the album's third and final single, released on 11 August 1986 by Mute Records in the US, Intercord Records in West Germany, and Sire Records in the US.

In the UK, commercial releases included a 7", a 12" and a limited 12" vinyl single, given catalogue numbers 7BONG12, 12BONG12 and L12BONG12, respectively. Mute also released the 7" and both 12" singles promotionally, with a unique mix on the 7" release. In West Germany, Intercord Records released initial pressings of the 7" on red vinyl with catalogue number INT 111.841, as well as 12" and limited 12" releases that mirrored the UK release. In addition, Dischi Ricordi released a rare promotional 7" in Italy (catalogue number BONG12) that included a unique cover. After Black Celebration's first two singles, "Stripped" and "A Question of Lust", both featured black as the dominant color of its cover art, the 12" releases of "A Question of Time" got "optimistic" white covers.

Music producer Phil Harding remixed "A Question of Time" for the 12" single, and the B-side to both 12" releases were tracks recorded on 10 April 1986 in Birmingham, England, while the band was supporting the album with their Black Celebration Tour.

=== Music video ===
The music video for "A Question of Time" is the first Depeche Mode video to be directed by Anton Corbijn. Shot in Los Angeles in black and white and inspired by road movies, the video marked the beginning of a relationship that allowed Depeche Mode to craft the image they wanted. Said Alan Wilder later, "it wasn’t until Anton got involved in 1986, that we realised we could take more control over the cohesive image of the group." Corbijn had photographed the band back in 1981 for NME, and they had approached him to direct some of their music videos earlier in their career, but Corbijn had turned them down, saying "I didn't like their music much. They were kind of a teen band, and I was into serious music back then." The band liked Corbijn's video shoots because they were more intimate, sometimes just Corbijn and the band instead of having large video crews like their earlier videos. The whole band participated in a half day of shooting for the video, but when that wasn't enough, Wilder alone came back from a second day of shooting, which is why he is more prominent in the final product.

The video was later included on the video collection Strange, The Videos 86>98, the DVD of The Best of Depeche Mode Volume 1 and on Video Singles Collection.

== Critical reception ==
When reviewing the single, Lesley O'Toole of Record Mirror said the song is "not quite as alluring as 'A Question of Lust', but the rabid, sequenced throb is better programmed for radioland".

== Other releases ==
Remixes of "A Question of Time" have appeared on various best-of compilations, The Singles 86–98 (1998) and Remixes 2: 81–11 (2011). Live versions appear on 101 (1989), and releases of Recording the Angel (2006) and Recording the Universe (2010).

== Track listings ==
All tracks written by Martin L. Gore.

=== 7″: Mute / 7Bong12 (UK) ===
1. "A Question of Time" (remix) – 4:04 (remixed by Phil Harding)
2. "Black Celebration" (live) – 6:05

=== 12″: Mute / 12Bong12 (UK) ===
1. "A Question of Time" (extended remix) – 6:38 (remixed by Phil Harding)
2. "Black Celebration" (live) – 6:05
3. "Something to Do" (live) – 3:50
4. "Stripped" (live) – 6:21

=== 12″: Mute / L12Bong12 (UK) ===
1. "A Question of Time" (New Town mix) – 6:59 (remixed by Rico Conning)
2. "A Question of Time" (live remix) – 4:10
3. "Black Celebration" (Black Tulip mix) – 6:32 (remixed by Rico Conning)
4. "More Than a Party" (live) – 5:05

=== CD: Intercord / Mute INT 826.850 (West Germany) ===
1. "A Question of Time" (extended remix) – 6:38
2. "Stripped" (live) – 6:22
3. "Black Celebration" (live) – 6:05
4. "Something to Do" (live) – 3:50
5. "A Question of Time" (remix) – 4:04

== Charts ==
=== Weekly charts ===
Weekly chart performance for "A Question of Time"
Chart (1986–1987)	Peak position
Europe (European Hot 100 Singles)	14
Finland (Suomen virallinen lista)	14
France (SNEP)	29
Ireland (IRMA)	10
Netherlands (Dutch Top 40 Tipparade)	5
Netherlands (Single Top 100)	34
South Africa (Springbok Radio)	26
Spain (AFYVE)	27
Sweden (Sverigetopplistan)	18
Switzerland (Schweizer Hitparade)	9
UK Singles (OCC)	17
UK Indie (OCC)	1
US Dance Singles Sales (Billboard)	34
West Germany (GfK)	4

=== Year-end charts ===
Year-end chart performance for "A Question of Time"
Chart (1986)	Position
West Germany (Media Control)	70
