= Certain Things Are Likely (album) =

Studio album by Kissing the Pink
- Released: 1986
- Studio: Various: Eastcote Studios, London (Tracks 3, 4, 5, 7, 9, 10); Eden Studios, London (Tracks 3, 4, 7, 9); Unison Studios, Munich (Tracks 1, 6, 8); Ridge Farm Studio, Rusper (Track 2); AIR Studios, London (Track 2); PWL Studios, London (Track 5); Olympic Studios, London (Track 9)
- Genres: Dance-pop; electronic
- Length: 40:53
- Label: Magnet
- Producers: KTP; Peter Walsh; Phil Harding

Kissing the Pink chronology
What Noise (1984)	Certain Things Are Likely (1986)	Sugarland (1993)

Singles from Certain Things Are Likely
- 1. "One Step" Released: 1986; 2. "Never Too Late to Love You" Released: 1986; 3. "Certain Things Are Likely" Released: 1987

Certain Things Are Likely is the third studio album by the English pop band Kissing the Pink, released in 1986 by Magnet Records. Kissing the Pink co-produced the majority of the album with frequent collaborator Peter Walsh at various notable studios in Southern England (as well as one in Munich, Germany). Magnet Records remixed most of the album in an attempt to make the album sound more commercial, using Phil Harding, which at the time Nick Whitecross explained "this record is like a ticket for us to go to as many people as possible". The album continued to express similar themes and values in their lyrics found on their previous albums, such as their deadpan surrealist humor and mordantly satirical social commentary.

The album peaked at No. 93 in Australia, and the singles from the album got good airplay, allowing them to release one subsequent non-album single in 1988, "Stand Up (Get Down)", before being dropped from their label, meaning that Certain Things Are Likely would become Kissing the Pink's last studio album for seven years, until 1993's Sugarland, despite their various unsuccessful attempts to release music in the interim.

A remixed version of the album's title track "Certain Things Are Likely" was a No. 1 hit on the US Dance Club charts in 1987 but it did not chart in their homeland. "One Step", while only reaching No. 79 on the UK Singles Chart, was performed on Top of the Pops, and was also a success on the US Dance Club charts, peaking at No. 5. It also reached the Top 40 in Belgium, and the Netherlands. "Never Too Late to Love You", the least successful single from the album peaked at No. 32 on the US Dance Club charts but would later prove to be their final single to chart in the UK, peaking at No. 87.

Following the departure of founding members including second keyboardist George Stewart, saxophonist Josephine Wells, and violinist Peter Barnett, Certain Things Are Likely marked the first time that the band had had any other musicians but their own members playing on an album, and it features a variety of guest musicians on the album, including Matt Aitken (of Stock Aitken Waterman) providing additional guitar on the track "No-One's on the Same Side", whilst Derek Forbes (formerly of Simple Minds) provides additional bass on two tracks, "Dream, Dream", and "Jones". Chaz Jankel of Ian Dury and the Blockheads also provides additional bass on the final track of the album, "I Won't Wait". The album also features an array of backing vocalists, including Judy Cheeks.

After its original release, the album remained out of print on any format for many years. However, the album became available in 2012 via online MP3 download on major sites such as Amazon, and iTunes. This digital release included two bonus tracks, a 12" extended mix of "One Step", and a 7" radio mix of "Certain Things Are Likely".

== Critical reception ==
Professional ratings
Review scores
Source	Rating
AllMusic	1.5/5 stars

In a retrospective review for AllMusic, critic Michael Sutton wrote of the album, "Kissing the Pink's Certain Things Are Likely is generally considered by Kissing the Pink fans to be the group's weakest LP. And they're right", adding that the album "sounds as if the band was trying hard to produce a hit."

== Track listing ==
All tracks are written by Kissing the Pink.

Side one
No.	Title	Producer(s)	Length
1.	"One Step"	Peter Walsh	4:29
2.	"Never Too Late to Love You"	Peter Walsh	3:49
3.	"Certain Things Are Likely"	Kissing the Pink; Peter Walsh	4:13
4.	"Dream Dream"	Kissing the Pink; Peter Walsh	3:48
5.	"No-One's on the Same Side"	Kissing the Pink; Phil Harding	3:45

Side two
No.	Title	Producer(s)	Length
6.	"Can You Hear Me"	Peter Walsh	4:29
7.	"Jones"	Kissing the Pink; Peter Walsh	3:49
8.	"Identity Card"	Peter Walsh	3:26
9.	"One Day"	Kissing the Pink; Peter Walsh	4:11
10.	"I Won't Wait"	Kissing the Pink; Phil Harding	4:54
Total length:			40:53

MP3 Release Bonus Tracks
No.	Title	Length
11.	"One Step (Extended 12" Mix)"	7:14
12.	"Certain Things Are Likely (PWL 7" Radio Mix)"	4:10

== Personnel ==
Credits are adapted from the Certain Things Are Likely liner notes.

Kissing the Pink

- Nicholas Whitecross – lead vocals; guitar
- Jon Kingsley Hall – keyboards; vocals
- Simon Aldridge – guitar; vocals
- Stephen Cusack – drums; vocals

Additional musicians

- Matt Aitken – additional guitar (track 5)
- Alistair Fraser – bagpipes (track 6)
- Philip Bagenal – additional keyboards (track 10)
- Derek Forbes – additional bass on (tracks 4, 7)
- Andy Pasque – additional bass on (track 4)
- Alan Taylor – additional bass on (track 9)
- Chaz Jankel – additional bass on (track 10)
- Judy Cheeks – backing vocals (tracks 1, 2, 3, 4, 6, 8)
- Victoria Miles – backing vocals (tracks 1, 2, 3, 4, 6, 8)
- Scarlett Von Wollenman – backing vocals (tracks 2, 3, 10)
- The Lewis Sisters – backing vocals (track 2)

== Charts ==
Chart (1987)	Peak position
Australia (Kent Music Report)	93
