= Never Too Late to Love You =

Single by Kissing the Pink

from the album Certain Things Are Likely
- Released: October 1986 (UK); January 1987 (US)
- Studio: Ridge Farm Studio (Rusper); Air Studios (London)
- Genre: Dance-pop; electronic
- Length: 3:49
- Label: Magnet
- Songwriter(s): KTP
- Producer(s): Peter Walsh

Kissing the Pink singles chronology
"One Step" (1986)	"Never Too Late to Love You" (1986)	"Certain Things Are Likely" (1987)

Music video
- "Never Too Late to Love You" on YouTube

"Never Too Late to Love You" is a song by the English pop band Kissing the Pink, released as both a 7" and 12" single from their third studio album, Certain Things Are Likely (1986). Produced by Peter Walsh, "Never Too Late to Love You" was released as the second single from the album, peaking at No. 87 on the UK singles chart, and No. 32 on Billboard's Dance Club Songs chart in February 1987. The single features the non-album track, "Michael", a song about a sailor, as its B-side.

It was their last single to chart in the UK.

== Track listing ==
7" single

1. "Never Too Late to Love You"
2. "Michael"

12" single

1. "Never Too Late to Love You (Kissing the Mix)"
2. "Never Too Late to Love You (Extended Mix)"
3. "Never Too Late to Love You (Instrumental Dub)"
4. "Michael"

== Charts ==
Chart (1987)	Peak position
Australia (Kent Music Report)	86
UK Singles (OCC)	87
US Dance Club Songs (Billboard)	32
