= Black Celebration =

1986 studio album by Depeche Mode

Studio album by Depeche Mode
- Released: 17 March 1986
- Recorded: November 1985 – February 1986
- Studios: Westside and Genetic (London); Hansa Mischraum (West Berlin)
- Genres: Synth-pop; industrial; post-punk
- Length: 41:01
- Label: Mute
- Producers: Depeche Mode; Gareth Jones; Daniel Miller

Depeche Mode chronology
Catching Up with Depeche Mode (1985)	Black Celebration (1986)	Greatest Hits (1987)

Singles from Black Celebration
- 1. "Stripped" Released: 10 February 1986; 2. "A Question of Lust" Released: 14 April 1986; 3. "A Question of Time" Released: 11 August 1986; 4. "But Not Tonight" Released: 22 October 1986

Black Celebration is the fifth studio album by the English electronic music band Depeche Mode, released on 17 March 1986 by Mute Records in the UK and Sire Records in the US. Recorded in London and West Berlin, it was produced by Depeche Mode, Daniel Miller and Gareth Jones. At the prompting of Miller, the band recorded the album using the "live the album" ethos inspired by the film director Werner Herzog, which led to considerable tension between the band and both Miller and Jones, resulting in neither being involved in the production of subsequent Depeche Mode albums.

The album was promoted by the singles "Stripped", "A Question of Lust", and "A Question of Time". In the US, "But Not Tonight" was released as a single instead of "Stripped". In support of the album, Depeche Mode embarked on the five-month-long Black Celebration Tour across Europe, North America, and Japan, which ran from early to mid-1986.

Black Celebration is considered by critics as the start of a four album series of well-regarded Depeche Mode albums, continuing with Music for the Masses (1987), Violator (1990) and Songs of Faith and Devotion (1993). Three years after its release, Spin ranked it as the 15th-greatest album of all time, and the UK's Radio X in 2011 cited it as one of the most influential albums of the 1980s. Nine Inch Nails' Trent Reznor later cited Black Celebration as a source of inspiration for his album debut, Pretty Hate Machine (1989).

== Background ==
After touring through July 1985 in support of their previous album Some Great Reward (1984), Depeche Mode released two compilation albums in late 1985, The Singles 81→85 in the UK in October, and Catching Up with Depeche Mode in the US in November. Both albums included two new tracks which were both issued as singles, "Shake the Disease" (single released April 1985) and "It's Called a Heart" (single released September 1985).

On a personal level, singer Dave Gahan married his partner Jo Fox in August, songwriter Martin Gore was still living in West Berlin with his girlfriend Christina Friedrich, and Andy Fletcher and Alan Wilder had moved in with their girlfriends, Grainne Mullen and Jeri Young, respectively, in London. However, after their exhausting year of touring and recording, the band found themselves at odds when they reunited. Tensions within the band and their producer Daniel Miller had already come up during recording sessions earlier that year for "Shake the Disease". Said Gahan, "If we were ever going to split up the band it was at the end of 1985. We were really in a state of turmoil. Constant arguing. Very intense. We weren't really sure where to go [musically] after Some Great Reward, so we decided to slow things down. But it left us with too much time on our hands. So we spent most of our time arguing. Sometimes, it seems incredible that we came out of that period with the band and our sanity intact." The inter-personal conflict within what was normally a tight-knit group led Gore to hide away with a friend at a farm for a week, with Gore later saying "I freaked out. I had to go away for a few days." Ultimately, the band agreed to reconvene in London in November to try to record their new material.

== Recording ==
=== Production ===
Depeche Mode entered Westside Studios (Note: Just as Depeche Mode had recorded at Hansa Studios in part because David Bowie had a few years earlier, by coincidence Bowie had just finished sessions of his own at Westside Studios a few months earlier, where he recorded tracks such as "Absolute Beginners" and "Dancing in the Street" with Mick Jagger.) in London in the first week of November 1985 to start recording their new album. In starting to work on the new album, producer Miller said that he "was a bit frustrated because [he] couldn't get the guys to think about working in different ways," and to that end, Miller asked the band to attend the studio every day to work on the production to "live the album", wanting "a kind of intensity". Miller was inspired by the history of German film director Werner Herzog, saying that Herzog had made historical films "and [the people involved in production of the movies] really lived the films, and it was a very intense way of working." The band agreed to this approach, and Gore moved back to London from West Germany, where he had been living since the Some Great Reward recording sessions of 1983–84.

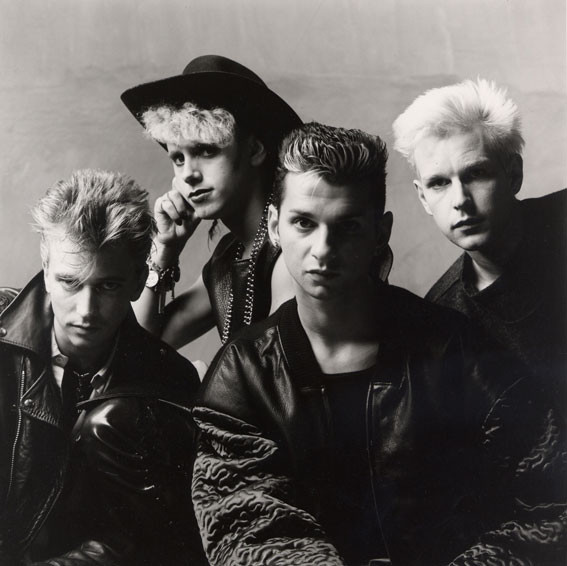
A promotional image of Depeche Mode, released in late 1985 just before the band entered the studio to record Black Celebration

Typical of Depeche Mode's previous few albums, Gore arrived at the sessions with demos of new songs for the album, and, determined to make their new album "a lot heavier, harder and darker [than their previous album]", brought in demos that were less structured and formal than he had in the past.

Said Wilder, "Martin [Gore] and I compose in totally different ways. Martin works on guitar and Ion keyboards. Yet we present our songs to the band in a similar form. We work on our songs on a four-track machine, and basically get a demo to the point where there's a bass line, a rough rhythm track, most of the melodies and all the lyrics. That's what the band gets to hear. Then we all sit down with Daniel [Miller], pick the songs we want to put on the album, and talk over the good and bad points - whether we need to change the structure or add or take out bits here and there."

Miller and the band's label, Mute Records, upon hearing the demos, were concerned about the morbid, slow songs, and worried that they lacked any radio-friendly singles. Said Gore, "they were saying that they didn't feel we had a single - I wasn't up to standard. I just freaked out! I thought something was going really wrong if we were starting to rely on pluggers and marketing people to tell us what we should be doing." After a week-long standoff, Miller and the label relented, allowing the band to "make the record you want to make." This stand-off preceded a tense 120 days in the studio, with the band and producers working 14 hours a day to complete the album, with few days off. Adding to the tension was that both Miller and Gareth Jones returned in their production roles from the band's previous album, but alongside them was now Alan Wilder, who had grown into production responsibilities for their music over the past few years. With three co-producers sharing space at the production desk, Miller said "Alan [Wilder] was becoming very adept in that studio-bod role which I'd filled before. That left my own position less defined but I still had a very strong point of view. I think that created a lot of tension." In addition, the entire group worked under tight timelines, intending to finish recording and mixing all their material, as well as completing all artwork for their album and singles, by Christmas 1985, although they missed this deadline and ended up working into the first few months of 1986. Years later, Miller remembered that the Black Celebration sessions "turned in a nightmare ... There was definitely tension in the studio" as a result of the "live the album" ethos of recording. Wilder said that the way the album was made, combined with Miller's brooding and Gore's dark songs, resulted in an "underlying darkness" in the material they created. In an attempt to cope with the stress of the album's production, the band and production crew smoked a lot of marijuana while recording the album, and this instilled a feeling of paranoia in the sessions.

The band continued to use new, bespoke sampled sounds while recording Black Celebration, fed into the Synclavier the band had used on their previous two albums. Andy Fletcher said "we had this theory at the time that every sound must be different and you must never use the same sound twice."

By the end of their recording sessions, the band and producers Jones and Miller had moved back to Hansa Studios in West Berlin, where they had recorded and mixed parts of their previous two albums. In partially explaining the move back to Berlin, singer Dave Gahan said the reason was "the atmosphere. There are no distractions [here at Hansa] like in London. I can't work in England anymore." Despite all the tension, Wilder later said that "the album's claustrophobic feel was probably down to the tension. I think it did add a chemistry to the sound of the record, more than any others we have done. It's one of my favourite records we have ever made."

=== Songs ===
One of the first songs the band recorded was "Stripped", which, according to Wilder, was one of the few songs that was "easy" to record for the album. "Stripped" incorporated the sound of Gahan's idling Porsche 911 and of a bottle rocket, as they were recording "Stripped" on Guy Fawkes Night (5 November every year). For the sound of the fireworks, they launched the rockets horizontally so that several microphones, set up in sequence, could capture the sound of the firework fizzing by.

Wilder spoke about the way they approached sampling for the album, using the track "It Doesn't Matter Two" as an example: "There are a lot of choir samples on that. It would have been very easy to take just one sample and play it back polyphonically. But instead, we took a different sample for each choir note, so each note is slightly out from the others. It gives it a very realistic feel. We spent a long time getting that to work, so that it sounded human. That goes for all the stuff we do, not just that one track." Lyrically, Gore summarized "It Doesn't Matter Two" as a "very desperate [song]. Very very morbid." Of "Sometimes", he described it as "about someone who questions their surroundings and ends up becoming tiring and embarrassing and over apologetic." "Fly on the Windscreen", which was the b-side to Depeche Mode's previous single, "It's Called a Heart" (1985), was deemed by the band to be "too good" to remain just a b-side, so it was re-mixed and included on the album. Title song "Black Celebration" starts with Miller's distorted voice saying the phrase "A brief period of rejoicing", taken from Winston Churchill's 8 May 1945 speech after the surrender of Germany to end World War II in Europe.

By 19 November 1985, the band was recording "A Question of Lust", one of four Gore-sung songs on the record, an all-time high for any Depeche Mode album to date. Alongside "A Question of Lust", Gore sang lead vocals on "Sometimes", "It Doesn't Matter Two" and "World Full of Nothing", saying "we've noticed that my voice is more suited to the softer and slower songs than [Gahan]'s".

After a single day off for New Year's Day 1986, the band returned to the studio, and on 14 January 1986 they had mixed the album track "World Full of Nothing" as well as recorded and mixed one of the album's B-sides. Miller said that, for their album Speak & Spell, the band had recorded so many songs that they just picked a few to be the B-sides for their singles. For Black Celebration, they wrote their B-sides separately. Said Jones, "There was never a sense that a B-side [from Black Celebration] was a throwaway." In addition, the band deliberately wanted to move away from just doing "simple extended version[s]" of their singles, instead opting to record the experimental "Black Day" and "Breathing in Fumes", which were based on album tracks "Black Celebration" and "Stripped", respectively. Because the B-sides were often recorded quickly, sometimes in just one day, Jones called their production "refreshing" after the weight of the other album track's recording sessions. Wilder said that "Black Day" was essentially recorded live, "[it] was one of those rare tracks that just came together spontaneously in the studio."

The album continued to be a transition album for Wilder, whose final songwriting credit with the band was the instrumental B-side "Christmas Island"; after Black Celebration Wilder continued to transition to spend more time arranging and performing songs and producing and engineering the band's sound. Years later, Wilder said he stopped songwriting for the band because it did not come naturally to him, and he struggled with the lyrics, saying "My interest is more about atmosphere and production and editing and all the other things."

Adding further tensions in the studio, Jones and Miller fretted over the album's final mix, taking three weeks to mix the album over and over, before the band finally staged an intervention to force a final mix. The completed mix included, according to Jones, "more reverb" and various echo effects to add to the "mystical" quality of the recording.

=== Image and relationship with the press ===
The band had been actively trying to shed the teenybopper image that they had acquired in their earliest years, and knew Black Celebration was going to be a big change for fans looking for songs like from their popular debut album Speak & Spell. Depeche Mode, and their label, were working to combat their perceived bias by music journalists, who, at the time, did not consider electronic music "real" music. Andy Fletcher said that "We had a real mission to prove to people that electronic music was a valid type of music," noting that Depeche Mode often incorporated guitar into their songs, but typically subverted its sound to make it unrecognizable. He elaborated, saying that, earlier in their career, "we were treated a bit unfairly in Britain because we were on an independent label without a manager ... and we was very young. I think we were naive." Wilder said that with Black Celebration, the band was likely "alienating some of the teen market but gaining more respect [among the press]." Lyrically, Gore described his writing style for his songs as "[creating] the right atmosphere, which is an attempt to get away from contemporary pop." For this album, their look, which was becoming darker, evolved naturally and the band claimed it was not contrived. Despite the album's rough beginning, the band's dark image and the brooding songs, by the time the band was promoting the album, the four members of the band were jovial, friendly and "normal" in everyday life.

=== Artwork ===
Martyn Atkins returned to design the album cover for Black Celebration, as he'd done for all of Depeche Mode's album covers since A Broken Frame (1982). Originally, he had designed a physical miniature building, draped in black banners and inspired by totalitarian imagery, to be photographed for the cover. However, the band was not happy with the original design and so the cover was re-designed to include only a cropped, close-up of the original photograph and they instead emphasized the logos around the image, which the band paid to have embossed on initial pressings of the album. Despite the changes, the album cover still only garnered mixed opinions from the band and label.

On the album's back cover is the phrase "Life in the so-called Space Age", which was a phrase from Gore meant to mean that despite all the advances in technology in the world, "nothing is changed. People are still emotionally numbed by material possession." In keeping with the "black" theme of the album, Black Celebration's first two singles, "Stripped" and "A Question of Lust", both featured black as the dominant color, and only the final single, "A Question of Time" had an "optimistic" white cover.

=== Title ===
The title "Black Celebration" was not a reference to Black mass or rituals of the Occult, but rather, it was meant to "[describe] the daily boredom of a dreary life without climaxes or hope for improvement." Said Gore, "Our songs from Black Celebration capture the idea: Make the most of what you have, and find consolation wherever you can." Gahan elaborated, "it's a common thing: at the end of a working day you go out and drown your sorrows no matter how shitty you feel or how bleak your future looks."

== Release and promotion ==
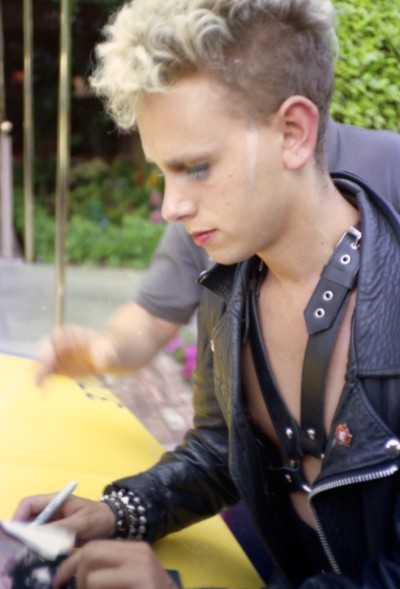
Martin Gore, pictured in July 1986, while on tour in the US in support of Black Celebration

"Stripped", the first single released from the album, was made available on 10 February 1986 in non-US territories. Black Celebration was released a month later on 17 March 1986 by Mute Records in the UK, Sire Records in the US, and Intercord Records in Germany. In the UK, the LP was given catalogue number STUMM26, and in Germany, INT 146.818. In Sweden, the Scandinavian Music Club included Black Celebration in a box set with the band's previous albums where the band's name was mis-spelled several times as "Best of Depech Mode" (catalogue number 15 6505). A promotional single for "Breathing in Fumes" was released in the UK (catalogue number RR12BONG10) and distributed exclusively to clubs to play on the dance floor. Despite Mute's concerns about the songs and the album, Black Celebration became Depeche Mode's best-selling album to date.

A month after the album's release, on 14 April 1986, the album's second single, "A Question of Lust" was issued, followed by "A Question of Time" on 11 August. Also in August 1986, Wilder released 1 + 2 under the name Recoil, a collection of sampled Depeche Mode sounds that he originally did not intend to make public until Miller persuaded him to turn the project into an album. Said Wilder, it was "an experiment, an improvisation that I had recorded in my home studio using really simple equipment." In September 1986, the movie Modern Girls was released, which included Depeche Mode's song "But Not Tonight" on its soundtrack. "But Not Tonight" was released as a US-only single on 22 October 1986, as US label Sire Records had decided to release it instead of "Stripped" in that region.

Black Celebration was remastered and re-released on CD and vinyl in 2007.

=== Tour ===
The band continued to use backing tapes on tour, a trade-off the band chose to make because although it led to some inflexibility, it made the band sound good live. Wilder defended the decision to use backing tapes, saying "We do put on a good live performance. We're one of the most exciting bands around. First, we always get a good sound, because everything always goes into the PA system. Second, we have a lot of vocal harmonies, which make a very big vocal sound. And third, we take a lot of trouble over the stage set and a good light show." The set was designed to hide much of the band's equipment and allow for Gahan's dancing. Wilder elaborated that "the flooring is designed for Dave [Gahan] to be able to dance around without flipping over – we had problems with that on previous tours."

The Black Celebration Tour began with a UK leg, starting in Oxford, England in late March 1986 and finishing a month later in London. The set list was modified early in the leg, when lacklustre crowd reactions to "Here is the House" led it to be dropped in favor of "New Dress". A European leg continued from April through May, followed by a North American and Japanese leg in June and July that concluded with three shows in Japan. In August, the tour began a second run of European shows, starting in Fréjus, France. The group performed additional dates in France and two shows in Italy before wrapping up the tour in Copenhagen in mid-August 1986. The band typically played larger venues than they had on previous tours, including in front of 20,000 fans in West Berlin. Of the tour, Wilder said "we always try to go for quite an elaborate stage design, with the lights and the whole show. We've been using video screens on this tour, as well, to try and get the whole look of the whole thing across for the people right at the back." Staging, like the album cover design, was inspired by 1930's German authoritarian imagery. They relied on Gahan's stage presence to help liven up their show, since most of the band spent most of their time behind their keyboards. Although the album wasn't a strong seller in the US, only hitting a high of number 90, the US leg of their tour was strongly attended. Gore noted that "We were playing to more people [in concert] than we were selling records to in the States. We could sell out everywhere we played." Wilder suggested that, to American audiences, Depeche Mode were "clean enough to crossover but subversive enough to push a few boundaries at the same time." According to an article from the French press published in 1987, more than 500,000 tickets were sold during the Black Celebration tour.

Following the heavy marijuana use in recording the album, the band drank a lot on tour, especially Gore. Said Wilder, Gore "was always a big drinker. When he's drunk he's the exact opposite to the shy person he is in everyday life. ... the next morning he's back to quiet Martin again."

Book of Love joined the tour as the opening act on 29 April in Hanover, West Germany, and continued for the rest of the first European leg and throughout all tour dates of the North American leg (ending on 15 July).

== Critical reception ==
Professional ratings
Review scores
Source	Rating
AllMusic	4/5 stars
Mojo	4/5 stars
NME	7/10
Number One	4/5 stars
PopMatters	9/10
Record Mirror	4/5
Rolling Stone	4.5/5 stars
The Rolling Stone Album Guide	4.5/5 stars
Smash Hits	8/10
Sounds	2.5/5 stars

Contemporaneous reviews for Black Celebration in the British press were mixed. Panning the album in Melody Maker, Steve Sutherland wrote that Depeche Mode came off as "pussycats desperate to appear perverted as an escape from the superficiality of teen stardom", while in Sounds, Kevin Murphy dismissed its songs as "harmless scenes of banality, with no twists and many happy endings." In a more lenient review for NME, Sean O'Hagan, although finding Gore's lyrics "adolescent" and the record's overall mood "dark yet faintly ridiculous", conceded that "within their own parameters, Depeche Mode create a resonant, if undemonstrative techno-pop tapestry" with "a rich textured sheen that is not without a certain depth." He added, "When the songs address topics other than the composer's state of mind ... Depeche Mode sound like a lot more than just a high tech, low-life melodrama." Writing for Smash Hits, Chris Heath was impressed by the album's "weirder" approach of mixing "dark, mysterious percussive" songs and "sweet, fragile and rather sinister ballads". Betty Page of Record Mirror praised Depeche Mode for their "refusal to follow anything but their own fashion" and "unswerving ability to come up with great, fresh melodies."

Black Celebration has since been reappraised in retrospective reviews. AllMusic critic Ned Raggett considered it a transitional work for Depeche Mode, moving away from their earlier "industrial-pop" sound and towards "a path that in many ways defined their sound to the present: emotionally extreme lyrics matched with amped-up tunes, as much anthemic rock as they are compelling dance, along with stark, low-key ballads." Danny Eccleston from Mojo said that it marked the start of the band's "post-industrial" period with its "richer, velvety soundworld", "insinuating melodies", and "positively Stentorian" vocals by Dave Gahan. Black Celebration was included in Spin's 1989 list of "The 25 Greatest Albums of All Time", at number 15.

According to Rolling Stone journalist Rob Sheffield, Black Celebration was an "instant classic for the band's fans" which was "utterly ignored by everybody else" at the time of its release. In 2019, Classic Pop Magazine said that with Black Celebration, Depeche Mode created "a tech-noir future dystopia" that "glitters in the gloom".

== Legacy ==
Black Celebration marked the end of a run of albums with Miller, Jones and Wilder co-producing, with Wilder saying "it signaled the end of a co-production relationship ... – although, I should add, not a falling out." The album helped the band turn the corner and move away from the teenybopper image they'd acquired in their early years, and became a cult classic, helping to set the template for "doom-laden alternative rock." Fletcher later recognised it as a "classic Depeche Mode fan favourite" among the band's albums in the EPK for their 1998 compilation The Singles 86>98, and said he found that "Black Celebration has got a collection of songs on there that's absolutely fantastic." Gore, also in 1998, said that the album marked a turning point for the band, saying "since the Black Celebration album we've started getting things right." Trent Reznor of Nine Inch Nails cited Black Celebration and its subsequent tour as an influence, saying that it helped inspire him to write the album Pretty Hate Machine (1989). Said Reznor, "DM was one of our favorite bands and the Black Celebration record took my love for them to a new level." American DJ Shadow cited Black Celebration as an influence, as did Wesley Eisold of rock band Cold Cave.

== Track listing ==
All tracks are written by Martin L. Gore, except where noted. All lead vocals by Dave Gahan, except where noted.

Side one
No.	Title	Lead vocals	Length
1.	"Black Celebration"		4:55
2.	"Fly on the Windscreen – Final"		5:18
3.	"A Question of Lust"	Gore	4:20
4.	"Sometimes"	Gore	1:53
5.	"It Doesn't Matter Two"	Gore	2:50

Side two
No.	Title	Lead vocals	Length
6.	"A Question of Time"		4:10
7.	"Stripped"		4:16
8.	"Here Is the House"	Gahan; Gore	4:15
9.	"World Full of Nothing"	Gore	2:50
10.	"Dressed in Black"	Gahan; Gore	2:32
11.	"New Dress"		3:42
Total length:			41:01

CD bonus tracks
No.	Title	Writer(s)	Lead vocals	Length
12.	"Breathing in Fumes"			6:07
13.	"But Not Tonight" (extended remix)			5:13
14.	"Black Day"	Gore; Alan Wilder; Daniel Miller	Gore	2:36
Total length:				54:57

US and Canada LP, CD and cassette bonus track
No.	Title	Length
12.	"But Not Tonight"	4:15
Total length:		45:16

=== 2007 Collectors Edition CD + DVD ===
Disc one (CD)
No.	Title	Length
1.	"Black Celebration"	4:55
2.	"Fly on the Windscreen – Final"	5:18
3.	"A Question of Lust"	4:20
4.	"Sometimes"	1:53
5.	"It Doesn't Matter Two"	2:50
6.	"A Question of Time"	4:10
7.	"Stripped"	4:16
8.	"Here Is the House"	4:15
9.	"World Full of Nothing"	2:50
10.	"Dressed in Black"	2:32
11.	"New Dress"	3:42

Disc two (DVD): DTS 5.1, Dolby Digital 5.1 and PCM Stereo
No.	Title	Length
1.	"Depeche Mode: 1985–86 (The Songs Aren't Good Enough, There Aren't Any Singles and It'll Never Get Played on the Radio)" (a short film)	57:40
2.	"Black Celebration"	4:55
3.	"Fly on the Windscreen – Final"	5:18
4.	"A Question of Lust"	4:20
5.	"Sometimes"	1:53
6.	"It Doesn't Matter Two"	2:50
7.	"A Question of Time"	4:10
8.	"Stripped"	4:16
9.	"Here Is the House"	4:15
10.	"World Full of Nothing"	2:50
11.	"Dressed in Black"	2:32
12.	"New Dress"	3:42

Disc 2 (DVD) additional tracks live in Birmingham, April 1986: DTS 5.1, Dolby Digital 5.1 and PCM Stereo
No.	Title	Length
13.	"Black Celebration"	6:11
14.	"A Question of Time"	4:37
15.	"Stripped"	6:34

Disc 2 (DVD) additional tracks: PCM Stereo
No.	Title	Writer(s)	Lead vocals	Length
16.	"Shake the Disease"		Gahan; Gore	4:52
17.	"Flexible"			3:14
18.	"It's Called a Heart"			3:51
19.	"Fly on the Windscreen"			5:07
20.	"But Not Tonight"			4:19
21.	"Breathing in Fumes"			6:08
22.	"Black Day"	Gore; Wilder; Miller	Gore	2:39
23.	"Christmas Island"	Gore; Wilder	instrumental	4:52

== Personnel ==
=== Depeche Mode ===
- Alan Wilder
- Andrew Fletcher
- David Gahan
- Martin Gore

=== Technical ===
- Depeche Mode – production
- Gareth Jones – production
- Daniel Miller – production
- Richard Sullivan – engineering assistance
- Peter Schmidt – engineering assistance
- Tim Young – mastering
- Dave Allen – recording on "Fly on the Windscreen – Final"
- Phil Tennant – recording assistance on "Fly on the Windscreen – Final"

=== Artwork ===
- Martyn Atkins – design
- David A. Jones – design
- Mark Higenbottam – design
- Brian Griffin – photography
- Stuart Graham – photography assistance

== Charts ==
=== Weekly charts ===
1986 weekly chart performance for Black Celebration
Chart (1986)	Peak position
Australian Albums (Kent Music Report)	69
Austrian Albums (Ö3 Austria)	26
Canada Top Albums/CDs (RPM)	47
Dutch Albums (Album Top 100)	35
European Albums (Music & Media)	5
Finnish Albums (Suomen virallinen lista)	17
French Albums (IFOP)	11
German Albums (Offizielle Top 100)	2
Italian Albums (Musica e dischi)	9
New Zealand Albums (RMNZ)	34
Swedish Albums (Sverigetopplistan)	5
Swiss Albums (Schweizer Hitparade)	1
UK Albums (Official Charts)	4
UK Independent Albums (MRIB)	1
US Billboard 200	90

2013 weekly chart performance for Black Celebration
Chart (2013)	Peak position
Hungarian Albums (MAHASZ)	29

2017 weekly chart performance for Black Celebration
Chart (2017)	Peak position
Polish Albums (ZPAV)	37

2025 weekly chart performance for Black Celebration
Chart (2025)	Peak position
Greek Albums (IFPI)	44

=== Year-end charts ===
Year-end chart performance for Black Celebration
Chart (1986)	Position
European Albums (Music & Media)	24
German Albums (Offizielle Top 100)	19
Swiss Albums (Schweizer Hitparade)	23

== Certifications ==
Certifications for Black Celebration
Region	Certification	Certified units/sales
France (SNEP)	Gold	100,000^{*}
Germany (BVMI)	Platinum	500,000^{^}
United Kingdom (BPI)	Silver	60,000^{^}
United States (RIAA)	Gold	500,000^{^}
^{*} Sales figures based on certification alone.^{^} Shipments figures based on certification alone.
