= Georgio (singer) =

Georgio Allentini
- Born: George Allen; 1966 (age 59–60)
- Genres: R&B, pop, dance
- Years active: 1987–1991
- Labels: Motown (1987–90); RCA (1991)

Georgio Allentini, born George Allen (born 1966), better known by the stage name and mononym Georgio, is an American funk and dance music singer, songwriter and multi-instrumentalist based in California. Allentini also produced, directed and starred in the film Tapped Out in 2003.

== Music career ==
Georgio initially attempted to join Paisley Park Records by sending demos to Prince, but this was unsuccessful. He created his own label, Georgio Records, with which he recorded his the track "Sexappeal" (sometimes "Sex Appeal"). "A lot of people in Los Angeles just gave me the run- around and didn't want to make a commitment." Allentini stated.

In 1984, Motown Records showed interest in Allentini and he was eventually signed to the label. Said Motown's then-vice-president of A&R Russ Regan "I heard Sexappeal for myself on my car radio one day and felt it was a record Motown had to go after, but I wanted to meet the artist first. I didn't want to buy just a record. We had dinner and I got excited. There was just something about him."

In 1987, Allentini had several songs charting on the Billboard Hot 100, although none climbed any higher than number 58. He was much more successful on the Hot Dance Music/Club Play chart, where he earned four Top 10 hits, including "Tina Cherry" which went to number 1. His 1988 release, "Lover's Lane" reached number 54 in the UK Singles Chart.

== Film career ==
Georgio made the transition to filmmaker with the 2003 release of Tapped Out, which starred Coolio, Alex Avant and Jimmy Bridges. The film was written, co-produced and co-directed by Allentini, who also composed music for its soundtrack.

Allentini also appeared in the 2000 French documentary entitled XX elles with Estelle Desanges, Lisa Guerlain, Dany Verissimo-Petit and others.

== Personal life ==
Allentini was born in Texas in 1966. His mother was a retail salesperson, his father a Naval officer. Georgio moved to Los Angeles at age 17. He is married to actress Kelly Jo Minter.

== Discography ==
=== Albums ===
- 1987: Sex Appeal (Motown Records)
- 1988: Georgio (Motown Records)
- 1991: Rollin' (RCA)

=== Singles ===
(Selective)

- 1987: "Sexappeal" or "Sex Appeal" number 58 US number 16 R&B
- 1987: "Tina Cherry" number 96 US number 5 R&B
- 1987: "I Won't Change"
- 1987: "Lover's Lane" number 59 US number 26 R&B
- 1988: "Bedrock" number 37 R&B
- 1988: "I Don't Want 2 Be Alone" #37 R&B
- 1989: "Car Freak"
- 1989: "Romantic Love"

== Filmography ==
=== Director ===
- 2003: Tapped Out (also as producer / screenwriter / actor / composer of soundtrack)

== See also ==
- List of number-one dance hits (United States)
- List of artists who reached number one on the US Dance chart
