= Tina Cherry =

Song by Georgio
- Released: 1987
- Genre: Dance, soul

Tina Cherry is a 1987 dance/soul single by Georgio. The single was his highest entry on the soul singles chart, peaking at number five, yet only reached number ninety-six on the Hot 100. "Tina Cherry" was Georgio's most popular release on the dance charts, reaching the number one spot for one week.

== Charts ==
Chart (1987)	Peak position
Italy Airplay (Music & Media)	19
U.S. Billboard Hot 100	96
U.S. Billboard Hot Black Singles	5
U.S. Billboard Hot Dance Club Play	1
