= A Question of Lust =

Single by Depeche Mode

from the album Black Celebration
- B-side: "Christmas Island"
- Released: 14 April 1986
- Recorded: November 1985 – January 1986
- Studio: Westside (London); Hansa Mischraum (Berlin)
- Genre: Synth-pop; dark wave
- Length: 4:29 (7" single version); 4:23 (album version)
- Label: Mute
- Songwriter: Martin L. Gore
- Producers: Depeche Mode; Gareth Jones; Daniel Miller

Depeche Mode singles chronology
"Stripped" (1986)	"A Question of Lust" (1986)	"A Question of Time" (1986)

Music video
- "A Question of Lust" on YouTube

Professional ratings
Review scores
Source	Rating
AllMusic	4/5 stars

"A Question of Lust" is a song by the English electronic music band Depeche Mode from their fifth studio album, Black Celebration (1986). It was released on 14 April 1986 in the UK by Mute Records and in West Germany by Intercord Records.

The single reached number 28 in United Kingdom and number 8 in West Germany.

== Background and recording ==
Depeche Mode released their album Black Celebration in mid-March 1986, and its first single, "Stripped", was released the month before. Due to scheduling and recording conditions, recording sessions for the album were tense and the band were constantly under deadlines to deliver. Recording for "A Question of Lust" occurred around 19 November 1985. "A Question of Lust" was one of four songs sung by songwriter Martin Gore on the album, and the first Gore-sung Depeche Mode single since 1984. Although recording started at Westside Studios in London, final production and mixing moved to Hansa Studios in West Berlin by early 1986. In 1998, Gore said the song is "almost like an old 50s or 60s classic pop song. It's a really good song to do live and has a great melody."

B-side "Christmas Island", an instrumental, was co-written by Gore and Alan Wilder, and represented Wilder's final writing credit for the band before his departure in 1995.

== Release and promotion ==
"A Question of Lust" was released on 14 April 1986 by Mute Records in the UK and Intercord Records in West Germany. In the UK, the single was released on 7" and 12" vinyl with catalogue numbers 7BONG11 and 12BONG 11, respectively. Intercord released a 7" single (first editions were pressed on red vinyl), a 12" single, and a limited 12" single that included a booklet containing band photos and information with catalogue numbers INT 111.836, INT 126.841 and INT126.844, respectively.

In the US, Sire Records released the single only promotionally, with 7" and 12" vinyl releases that contained unique remixes by Robert Margouleff; catalogue numbers were 7-28697-DJ for the 7" and PRO-A-2504 for the 12". In addition, on 4 March 1987, Sire Records released a promotional 7" with "A Question of Lust" on the A-side and "People Are People" on the B-side (catalogue number 92 86977 in Canada and 7 21994 in the US).

"A Question of Lust" reached number 28 in the UK and made it into the top 10 on the West German charts. The band reported that George Michael liked the song enough that he considered releasing a cover of it, although that apparently never came to fruition.

In 2017, "A Question of Lust" was included on Billboard's list of their top 20 Depeche Mode songs.

The B-side, "Christmas Island", was featured in the end credits for the second episode of the Disney+ series, Hawkeye in 2021.

=== Music video ===
The music video for "A Question of Lust" features the return of director Clive Richardson for his last video with the band.

== Track listings ==
All songs written by Martin L. Gore, except "Christmas Island", written by Gore and Alan Wilder, and "If You Want", written by Wilder.

- 7" single: Mute / 7BONG11 (UK)
1. "A Question of Lust" – 4:29
2. "Christmas Island" – 4:51
- 12" single: Mute / 12BONG11 (UK)
1. "A Question of Lust" – 4:29
2. "Christmas Island (Extended)" – 5:37
3. "People are People (Live)" – 4:21
4. "It Doesn't Matter Two (Instrumental)" – 2:49
5. "A Question of Lust (Minimal)" – 6:49
- 12" single: Intercord: INT 826.841
1. "A Question of Lust (Flood Mix)" – 5:07 [*]
2. "Christmas Island" – 4:51
3. "If You Want (Live)" – 5:16
4. "Shame (Live)" – 4:13
5. "Blasphemous Rumours (Live)" – 5:25

== Charts ==
=== Weekly charts ===
Weekly chart performance for "A Question of Lust"
Chart (1986)	Peak position
Belgium (Ultratop 50 Flanders)	32
Europe (European Hot 100 Singles)	21
Finland (Suomen virallinen lista)	15
Ireland (IRMA)	13
Netherlands (Dutch Top 40)	24
Netherlands (Single Top 100)	19
Sweden (Sverigetopplistan)	17
Switzerland (Schweizer Hitparade)	12
UK Singles (Official Charts)	28
UK Indie (OCC)	1
West Germany (GfK)	8

=== Year-end charts ===
Year-end chart performance for "A Question of Lust"
Chart (1986)	Position
West Germany (Media Control)	59
