= Naked (Kissing the Pink album) =

Studio album by Kissing the Pink
- Released: 27 May 1983
- Studios: AIR (London, England)
- Genres: New wave; synth-pop; electronic
- Length: 44:46
- Label: Magnet
- Producers: Colin Thurston; Peter Walsh; Neil Richmond; David King; Kissing the Pink

Kissing the Pink chronology
Naked (1983)	What Noise (1984)

Singles from Naked
- 1. "Mr. Blunt" Released: 1982; 2. "Watching Their Eyes" Released: 1982; 3. "The Last Film" Released: 1983; 4. "Love Lasts Forever" Released: 1983; 5. "Maybe This Day" Released: 1983; 6. "Big Man Restless" Released: 1983

Naked is the debut studio album by the English new wave and synth-pop band Kissing the Pink, released on 27 May 1983 by Magnet Records. The album peaked at No. 54 on the UK Albums Chart in June 1983, and produced their Top 20 hit "The Last Film". The song was their best performing single in the UK, and the only one to break the top 75. It is their only album to feature singer Sylvia Griffin who left the band before the album was completed.

32 years after its original release, Naked was reissued in 2015 as a remastered special edition CD by Cherry Red, which includes the 12 original album tracks plus seven related bonus tracks all sourced from the original master tapes.

== Reception ==
Ondarock writer Cristiano Orlando described Naked as "a little new-wave gem that would not have looked out of place alongside, among others, the early Human League, the debut by Tears for Fears, the Ultravox of the Midge Ure era and, why not, certain facets of Talking Heads and OMD".

== Track listing ==
All tracks are written by Kissing the Pink.

Side one
No.	Title	Length
1.	"The Last Film"	3:29
2.	"Frightened in France"	3:15
3.	"Watching Their Eyes"	3:56
4.	"Love Lasts Forever"	5:38
5.	"All for You"	4:04
6.	"The Last Film (Hymn Version)"	3:17

Side two
No.	Title	Length
7.	"Big Man Restless"	3:48
8.	"Desert Song"	3:59
9.	"Broken Body"	3:24
10.	"Maybe This Day"	3:38
11.	"In Awe of Industry"	3:18
12.	"Mr. Blunt"	3:00
Total length:		44:46

Cherry Red Reissue Bonus Tracks
No.	Title	Length
13.	"Mr. Blunt (Mixed for Feet)"	4:50
14.	"Watching Their Eyes (Club Mix)"	5:20
15.	"The Last Film (Extended Version)"	4:09
16.	"Love Lasts Forever (12" Version)"	6:15
17.	"We Are Your Family (Special Club Version)"	5:52
18.	"Middleton Row"	3:42
19.	"Big Man Restless (Club Mix)"	7:08

== Personnel ==
Credits are adapted from the Naked liner notes.

Kissing the Pink

- Nicholas Whitecross – guitar; vocals
- Jon Kingsley Hall – keyboards; synthesizer; vocals
- George Stewart – keyboards; vocals
- Josephine Wells – saxophone; vocals
- Stevie Cusack – drums; percussion; vocals
- Peter Barnett – bass; violin; vocals
- Sylvia Griffin – vocals (uncredited)

Production and artwork

- Colin Thurston – producer
- Peter Walsh – producer
- Neil Richmond – producer
- David King – producer
- Kissing the Pink – producer
- Tim Barnett – front cover painting
- Shoot That Tiger! – art direction; design

== Chart performance ==
Chart	Position
UK Albums Chart	54
