= Sex Appeal (album) =

Studio album by Georgio
- Released: 1987
- Recorded: 1987
- Genre: R&B, Funk
- Length: 36:08
- Label: Motown Records
- Producer: Georgio

Georgio chronology
Sex Appeal (1987)	Georgio (1988)

Sex Appeal is the debut album from Minneapolis, Minnesota native singer-songwriter Georgio.

== Reception ==
Professional ratings
Review scores
Source	Rating
Allmusic	4/5 stars

Originally released in 1987 on Motown Records. The album peaked at number 117 on the US pop albums chart and number 27 on the US R&B album chart when it was released.

== Track listing ==
All songs written and composed by Georgio

1. Sexappeal 4:33
2. Lover's Lane 4:46
3. 1/4 2 9 4:40
4. Menage A Trois 3:38
5. Bed Rock 4:30
6. Tina Cherry 4:38
7. Hey U 5:17
8. I Won't Change 4:04

== Charts ==
Chart (1987)	Peak position
Billboard Pop Albums	117
Billboard Top R&B Albums	27

=== Singles ===
Year	Single	Chart positions		
Year	Single	US	US R&B	US Dance
1987	"Lovers Lane"	59	26	2
1987	"Sex Appeal"	58	16	8
1987	"Tina Cherry"	96	5	1
