= Makeshift Feelgood =

Studio album by X-Press 2
- Released: September 24, 2006

X-Press 2 chronology
Muzikizum (2001)	Makeshift Feelgood (2006)

Makeshift Feelgood is the second album by English electronic dance music group X-Press 2. It features guest performances by Tim DeLaughter from The Polyphonic Spree, Kurt Wagner from Lambchop, Anthony Roman from Radio 4, 1980s band Kissing the Pink, and, on the second single "Kill 100", Rob Harvey from English rock group The Music. "Kill 100" reached #59 in the UK Singles Chart.

"Witchi Tai To" is a cover version of the 1969 Everything Is Everything song "Witchi-Tai-To" written by Jim Pepper.

== Track listing ==
1. "Give It" (featuring Kurt Wagner)
2. "Witchi Tai To" (featuring Tim DeLaughter)
3. "Enjoy the Ride" (featuring Kissing The Pink)
4. "Fellow Cutie"
5. "Don't Make Me Wait" (featuring Bernard Fowler)
6. "Kill 100" (featuring Rob Harvey)
7. "17" (featuring Anthony Roman)
8. "Light My Soul" (featuring Kissing The Pink)
9. "The Answer" (featuring Kissing The Pink)
10. "Last Man" (featuring Kissing The Pink)
11. "Makeshift Feelgood" (hidden track)

On initial pressings of the CD release (BRASSIC32CD and TB 1667-2), "Makeshift Feelgood" is included as a hidden track, beginning after 30 seconds of silence following "Last Man". On later UK pressings, it has been included as a separate track (EAN 82876886902).

The album's digital release includes "Makeshift Feelgood" as track 11. Digital platforms list track 10 as "Lastman" in a single word. It also includes two bonus tracks:

- "Give It" (featuring Kurt Wagner) (Quantic Soul Orchestra Dub)
- "Kill 100" (The Music Mix)

== Singles ==
Three singles were released:

- "Give It", featuring Kurt Wagner, in 2005
- "Kill 100", featuring Rob Harvey, in 2006
- "Witchi Tai To", featuring Tim De Laughter, in 2007 (vinyl and digital only)
