= X-Press 2 =

English electronic dance music duo

- Origin: London, England
- Genres: EDM; house; deep house
- Years active: 1993–present
- Label: Skint
- Members: Darren House (DJ Diesel); Darren Rock (DJ Rocky)
- Past members: Ashley Beedle

X-Press 2 are an English electronic dance music duo. The members are DJ Diesel (Darren House) and DJ Rocky (Darren Rock). Ashley Beedle left to pursue solo projects in 2009. They were DJ Award winners in 2002 and Ivor Novello winners in 2003.

== History ==
Explaining the band's name, Darren Rock (aka 'DJ Rocky') explained that acid house legend Terry Farley of Fire Island came up with it. Rocky said, "We were originally going to call ourselves Rock 2 House, but [Farley] wasn't really into that. So he renamed us X-Press 2. He basically liked the S'Express so kind of adapted that."

X-Press 2 first rose to underground prominence through the tracks "Muzik Express" and "London Xpress" which were both released on Junior Boys Own Records. X-Press 2 also gained plaudits on the club scene for regularly playing in clubs with their multi-decked (up to six decks with three DJs) sets.

Their debut US single, "The Sound" peaked at number one on the Hot Dance Music/Club Play chart in 1996. 2001 saw the release of their album Muzikizum which contained two more US dance chart entries: "Smoke Machine" (number 31) and "Lazy", which peaked at number one in 2002 and also peaked at number two on the UK Singles Chart in the duo's native United Kingdom, as well as winning them the prestigious Ivor Novello award in 2003. The lead vocals on "Lazy" are sung by David Byrne (formerly of Talking Heads), and on "I Want You Back" by Dieter Meier of Yello.

Makeshift Feelgood appeared in 2006, featuring Tim DeLaughter, Kurt Wagner, Anthony Roman from Radio 4, Kissing the Pink and Rob Harvey.

In 2013 the "Kill 100 (Carl Craig re-mix)" was used by Raf Simons for his debut Spring/Summer 2013 show in his role as creative director for Dior.

As of 2015, X-Press 2 were signed to Skint Records, a BMG company.

== Discography ==
=== Albums ===
- Late Night Sessions II (1997)
- Muzikizum (2002) - UK No. 15
- Makeshift Feelgood (2006)
- The House of X-Press 2 (2012)
- MMXV (2015)
- Thee (2023)

=== Compilation albums ===
- Remixes (2002)
- Raise Your Hands – The Greatest Hits (2008)
- Coast 2 Coast (2008)
- Choice: Mixed By X-Press 2

== Soundtracks ==
"Lazy" by X-Press 2 featuring David Byrne is featured on the soundtrack for the 2010 film Wall Street: Money Never Sleeps

In David Byrne's American Utopia (2020), directed by Spike Lee,the song "Lazy" is performed live as part of the theatrical concert experience

In 2026 "Lazy" by X-Press 2 featuring David Byrne was included in the Grand Theft Auto VI (GTA 6) in game radio station "Flash FM"

=== Singles ===
Year	Title	Peak chart positions										Certifications	Album
Year	Title	UK	UK Dance	UK Indie	AUS	IRE	ITA	NED	NZ	SCO	US Club	Certifications	Album
1993	"Muzik X-Press"	—	—	—	—	—	—	—	—	—	—		Non-album singles
1993	"London X-Press"	59	—	—	—	—	—	—	—	—	—		Non-album singles
1993	"Say What!"	32	—	—	—	—	—	—	—	—	—		Non-album singles
1994	"Rock 2 House"/"Hip Housin'" (featuring Lo-Pro)	55	1	—	—	—	—	—	—	52	—		Non-album singles
1996	"The Sound"	38	3	—	—	—	—	—	—	58	1		Non-album singles
1996	"Tranz Euro Xpress"	45	6	—	—	—	—	—	—	53	—		Non-album singles
2000	"AC/DC"	60	5	8	—	—	—	—	—	67	—		Non-album singles
2001	"Muzik X Press" (re-issue)	86	29	12	—	—	—	—	—	—	—		Non-album singles
2001	"Muzikizum"	52	25	4	—	—	—	—	—	56	—		Muzikizum
2001	"Smoke Machine"	43	4	7	—	—	—	—	—	40	31		Muzikizum
2002	"Lazy" (featuring David Byrne)	2	1	1	52	15	37	78	31	4	1	BPI: Silver	Muzikizum
2002	"I Want You Back"	50	4	8	—	—	—	—	—	65	—		Muzikizum
2002	"Smoke Machine" (re-issue)	80	11	13	—	—	—	—	—	98	—		Muzikizum
2002	"Supasong"	100	19	18	—	—	—	—	—	—	—		Muzikizum
2003	"Call That Love"	90	23	24	—	—	—	—	—	—	—		Muzikizum
2004	"Strobelight Silhouette"	86	4	17	—	—	—	—	—	90	—		Non-album single
2005	"Give It" (featuring Kurt Wagner)	33	4	7	—	—	—	—	—	27	8		Makeshift Feelgood
2006	"Kill 100"	59	6	6	—	—	—	—	—	50	27		Makeshift Feelgood
2012	"Let Love Decide" (featuring Roland Clark)	—	—	—	—	—	—	—	—	—	—		The House of X-Press 2
"—" denotes items that did not chart or were not released in that territory.

== See also ==
- List of number-one dance hits (United States)
- List of artists who reached number one on the US Dance chart
