= What Noise =

Studio album by Kissing the Pink
- Released: October 1984
- Genre: Synth-pop; electronic
- Length: 42:43
- Label: Magnet
- Producer: Kissing the Pink; Philip Bagenal; David Strickland; John Walters; Neil Richmond; Ken Thomas

Kissing the Pink chronology
Naked (1983)	What Noise (1984)	Certain Things Are Likely (1986)

Singles from What Noise
- 1. "Radio On" Released: 1984; 2. "The Other Side of Heaven" Released: 1984

What Noise is the second studio album by the English synth-pop band Kissing the Pink, released in October 1984 by Magnet Records. It is the last Kissing the Pink album to feature founding members including saxophonist Josephine Wells, and violinist Peter Barnett. Second keyboardist George Stewart would also leave the band after this album but would later rejoin the band. The album features new addition, Simon Aldridge, who played guitar, and bass in the band. This album did not reach as much attention and was not as widespread as Kissing the Pink's other albums. It never held a worldwide release. It was their first album to make use of sampling.

34 years after its original release, What Noise was released on CD for the first time in 2018 by Cherry Red as a remastered special edition, which includes the 12 original album tracks plus seven related bonus tracks.

== Track listing ==
All tracks are written by Kissing the Pink.

Side one
No.	Title	Length
1.	"Other Side of Heaven"	4:10
2.	"Captain Zero"	3:44
3.	"Victory Parade"	2:54
4.	"Greenham"	3:30
5.	"Each Day in Nine"	3:08
6.	"The Rain It Never Stops"	3:36

Side two
No.	Title	Length
7.	"Radio On"	3:40
8.	"Martin"	2:52
9.	"Watching the Tears"	3:44
10.	"Footsteps"	3:52
11.	"Love & Money"	3:41
12.	"What Noise"	3:52
Total length:		42:43

Cherry Red Reissue Bonus Tracks
No.	Title	Length
13.	"The Other Side of Heaven (7" Remix)"	3:56
14.	"Radio On (12" Version)"	5:11
15.	"How Can I Live"	3:38
16.	"Katherine Clarke"	2:04
17.	"The Other Side of Heaven (12" Version)"	6:08
18.	"Celestial"	4:12
19.	"What Noise (Longer Version)"	5:52

== Personnel ==
Credits are adapted from the What Noise liner notes.

Kissing the Pink

- Nicholas Whitecross – guitar; keyboards; vocals
- Jon Kingsley Hall – keyboards; synthesizer; vocals
- George Stewart – keyboards; vocals
- Simon Aldridge – guitar; bass; vocals
- Josephine Wells – saxophone; vocals
- Stevie Cusack – drums; percussion; vocals
- Peter Barnett – violin; vocals
