= Kissing the Pink =

British band

- Also known as: KTP
- Origin: London, England
- Genres: New wave; synth-pop
- Years active: 1980–present
- Labels: The Martyrwell Music Co.; Magnet; Atlantic; WEA; SPV GmbH; Custer's Last Stand
- Members: Jon Kingsley Hall; Nick Whitecross; Simon Aldridge; Peter Barnett
- Past members: Sylvia Griffin; Josephine Wells; Stevie Cusack; George Stewart
- Website: jeffgrote.com/ktp/ktp.html

Kissing the Pink are an English new wave and synth-pop band formed in London in 1980.

== Career ==
The band formed in 1980 at the Royal College of Music, located in South Kensington, London. Their debut single was "Don't Hide in the Shadows", recorded with producer Martin Hannett at Strawberry Studios in Stockport. Hannett had previously worked with Joy Division, the Durutti Column, and John Cooper Clarke, but it was not until they dropped their first manager (celebrated in their song "Michael"), and signed a recording contract with Magnet Records that they began to get any airplay. They recorded their debut studio album, Naked, at AIR Studios with Colin Thurston as the main producer. The group had wanted Brian Eno to produce the album but Magnet thought Thurston would make a more commercial impact. As well as investing in a producer, Magnet paid for promotional videos to be made for the singles "Mr. Blunt" (shot at the Long Man of Wilmington) and "Watching Their Eyes". After these near-misses, their single "The Last Film" reached the top 20 of the UK Singles Chart, their only hit in the UK. Their album, Naked, reached No. 54 on the UK Albums Chart.

Their first Billboard Hot 100 entry was "Maybe This Day", which reached No. 87 in the chart in 1983. In 1984, they released their second album What Noise. This album did not attract as much attention and distribution was not as widespread as their other albums. It never received a worldwide release.

In 1985, following the departure of some of the members, the band shortened their name to KTP and released several singles that placed on the Hot Dance Music/Club Play chart. The most successful was "Certain Things Are Likely", which spent three weeks at No. 1 in 1987. That song also became their second Hot 100 entry when it peaked at No. 97 on the chart later that year. From the same album, "One Step" was the biggest selling single in Italy that year.

In 1988, the band released the standalone single, "Stand Up (Get Down)", on a new label WEA; It would prove to be their only release on that label after it failed to chart, and they wouldn't release any more new material for five years.

Kissing the Pink's last physically-released album, Sugarland, which was their first in seven years, was a blend of psychedelic music and dance-pop. Since then, the band have made an album with Ecologist called Hot Filth which took the mixing of psychedelic music with jazz and other musical forms further still.

In 2015, Kissing the Pink released two albums digitally on Bandcamp: Digital People, and FatHome.

On 7 November 2025, Kissing the Pink released their seventh album Everything's For Sale through Cherry Red Records.

== Collaborations ==
Whitecross, Hall and Stewart collaborated on many dance records in the early 1990s, and made it to the top of the dance charts in 1994 with the artist Mike ("Twangling (Three Fingers in a Box)" on Pukka Records). They recorded an album in 2003 with jazz saxophonist Candy Dulfer called Right in My Soul. They also worked with Gareth Gates on his Pictures of the Other Side album. Whitecross has written a considerable amount of material for pop artists such as Kim Wilde (including her Top 40 hit "Heart over Mind"), Jem, Jaci Velasquez, Jonna Lee, Glen Scott, Leslie Clio, and Shea Seger. The band wrote and feature on four tracks on the X-Press 2 album Makeshift Feelgood, alongside Tim DeLaughter, Kurt Wagner and Rob Harvey from the Music.

== Marchioness disaster ==
In 1989, former KTP saxophonist Jo Wells, who had gone on to tour with Tears for Fears and the Communards, was aboard a pleasure boat in the Marchioness disaster, which resulted in the deaths of 51 people, including a cousin. Wells subsequently experienced a mental health crisis and developed a dependency on alcohol. She became unable to work, has sold two of her saxophones, and was living on Income Support in 2012.

== Discography ==
=== Studio albums ===
Title	Album details	Peak chart positions	
Title	Album details	UK	AUS
Naked	Released: 27 May 1983; Label: Magnet, Atlantic; Formats: LP, MC	54	—
What Noise	Released: October 1984; Label: Magnet; Formats: LP, MC	—	—
Certain Things Are Likely (as KTP)	Released: October 1986; Label: Magnet, Mercury; Formats: CD, LP, MC	—	93
Sugarland	Released: 1993; Label: SPV, Custer's Last Stand; Formats: CD	—	—
Digital People	Released: 26 March 2015; Label: Self-released; Formats: digital download	—	—
FatHome	Released: 26 March 2015; Label: Self-released; Formats: digital download	—	—
Everything's For Sale	Released: 7 November 2025; Label: Cherry Red; Formats: digital streaming		
"—" denotes releases that did not chart or were not released in that territory.

=== EPs ===
Title	Album details
Kissing the Pink	Released: 1983; Label: Atlantic; Formats: 12", MC; US and Canada-only release

=== Singles ===
Title	Year	Peak chart positions									Album
Title	Year	UK	AUS	BE (FL)	IT	NL	US	US Dance	NZ	SWE	Album
"Don't Hide in the Shadows"	1981	—	—	—	—	—	—	—	—	—	Non-album single
"Mr Blunt"	1982	—	—	—	—	—	—	—	—	—	Naked
"Watching Their Eyes"	1982	—	—	—	—	—	—	—	—	—	Naked
"The Last Film"	1983	19	—	—	—	—	—	—	—	—	Naked
"Love Lasts Forever"	1983	85	—	—	—	—	—	—	—	—	Naked
"Maybe This Day"	1983	83	—	—	—	—	87	—	—	—	Naked
"Big Man Restless" (not released in the UK)	1983	—	—	—	—	—	—	—	—	—	Naked
"Radio On"	1984	—	—	—	—	—	—	—	—	—	What Noise
"The Other Side of Heaven"	1985	—	—	—	—	—	—	—	—	—	What Noise
"One Step" (as KTP)	1986	79	—	23	3	25	—	5	—	—	Certain Things Are Likely
"Never Too Late to Love You" (as KTP)	1986	87	86	—	—	—	—	32	—	—	Certain Things Are Likely
"Certain Things Are Likely" (as KTP)	1987	—	—	—	—	—	97	1	—	—	Certain Things Are Likely
"Stand Up"	1988	—	—	—	—	—	—	—	—	—	Non-album singles
"Big Man Restless Remixes" (Germany-only release)	1993	—	—	—	—	—	—	—	—	—	Non-album singles
"Dalai Lama Loves You All" (as KTP)	1993	—	—	—	—	—	—	—	—	—	Sugarland
"—" denotes releases that did not chart or were not released in that territory.

== See also ==
- List of number-one dance hits (United States)
- List of artists who reached number one on the US Dance chart
