= List of number-one albums of 2009 (Spain) =

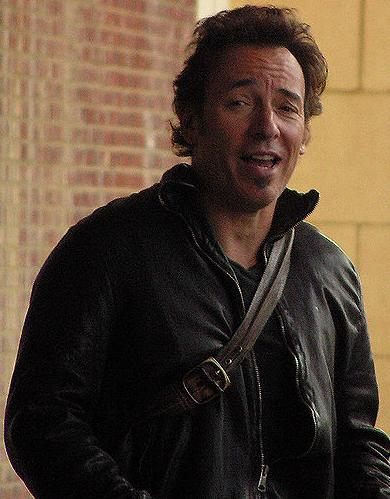
American singer Bruce Springsteen peaked at number one with his sixteenth studio album Working on a Dream.

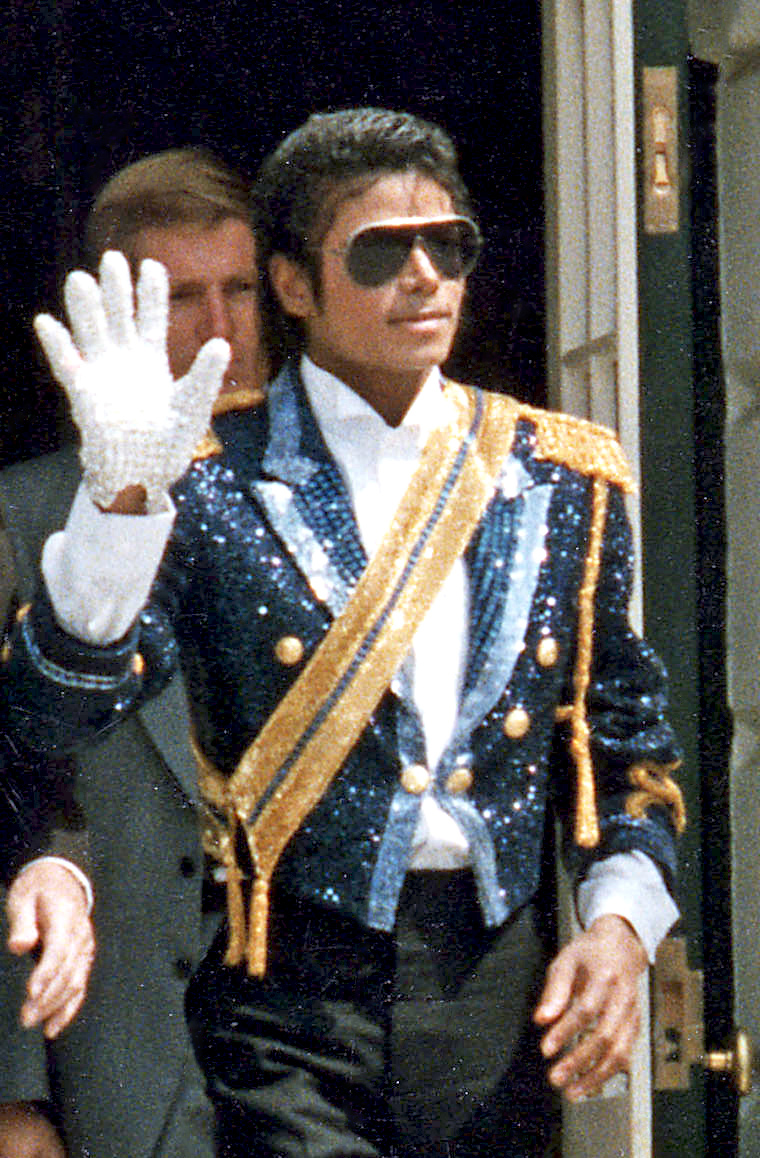
After his death, American singer Michael Jackson stayed at number one for five consecutives weeks with his compilation albums King of Pop and The Collection, being the only artist ever who has replaced himself at number one in the Spanish Top 100.

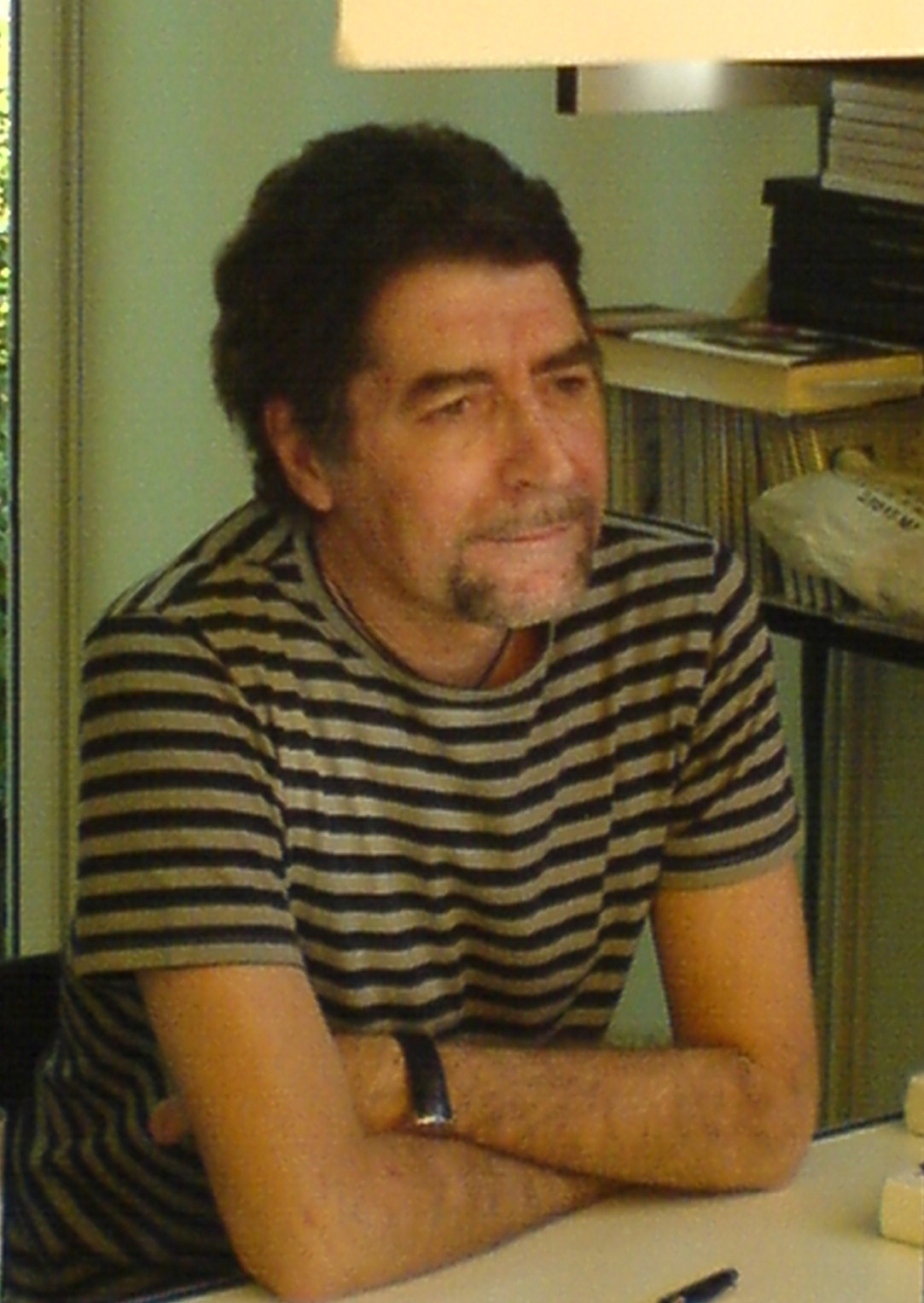
Spanish singer Joaquín Sabina was the artist who spent most weeks at number one in 2009, staying on top for 6 consecutive weeks with his album Vinagre y Rosas.

Top 100 España is a record chart published weekly by PROMUSICAE (Productores de Música de España), a non-profit organization composed by Spain and multinational record companies. This association tracks record sales (physical and digital) in Spain.

== Albums ==
Chart date	Album	Artist	Reference
January 4	50 Años Después	Raphael	
January 11	Amaia Montero	Amaia Montero	
January 18	Amaia Montero	Amaia Montero	
January 25	Amaia Montero	Amaia Montero	
February 1	Working on a Dream	Bruce Springsteen	
February 8	Working on a Dream	Bruce Springsteen	
February 15	Working on a Dream	Bruce Springsteen	
February 22	Working on a Dream	Bruce Springsteen	
March 1	Absolutamente	Fangoria	
March 8	No Line on the Horizon	U2	
March 15	No Line on the Horizon	U2	
March 22	No Line on the Horizon	U2	
March 29	Stage	Mónica Naranjo	
April 5	No Line on the Horizon	U2	
April 12	No Line on the Horizon	U2	
April 19	A las Buenas y a las Malas	Rosana	
April 26	Sounds of the Universe	Depeche Mode	
May 3	A las Buenas y a las Malas	Rosana	
May 10	Hannah Montana: The Movie	Soundtrack	
May 17	Hannah Montana: The Movie	Soundtrack	
May 24	21st Century Breakdown	Green Day	
May 31	Hannah Montana: The Movie	Soundtrack	
June 7	Hannah Montana: The Movie	Soundtrack	
June 14	Lines, Vines and Trying Times	Jonas Brothers	
June 21	Lines, Vines and Trying Times	Jonas Brothers	
June 28	Lines, Vines and Trying Times	Jonas Brothers	
July 5	Y.	Bebe	
July 12	King of Pop	Michael Jackson	
July 19	The Collection	Michael Jackson	
July 26	The Collection	Michael Jackson	
August 2	The Collection	Michael Jackson	
August 9	The Collection	Michael Jackson	
August 16	Y.	Bebe	
August 23	Y.	Bebe	
August 30	Aviones	Pereza	
September 6	Aviones	Pereza	
September 13	Relojes de Arena	David DeMaría	
September 20	Antes de que Cuente Diez	Fito & Fitipaldis	
September 27	Antes de que Cuente Diez	Fito & Fitipaldis	
October 4	Antes de que Cuente Diez	Fito & Fitipaldis	
October 11	Antes de que Cuente Diez	Fito & Fitipaldis	
October 18	Antes de que Cuente Diez	Fito & Fitipaldis	
October 25	Sin Mirar Atrás	David Bisbal	
November 1	Duermevela	El Barrio	
November 8	Duermevela	El Barrio	
November 15	Paraíso Express	Alejandro Sanz	
November 22	Vinagre y Rosas	Joaquín Sabina	
November 29	Vinagre y Rosas	Joaquín Sabina	
December 6	Vinagre y Rosas	Joaquín Sabina	
December 13	Vinagre y Rosas	Joaquín Sabina	
December 20	Vinagre y Rosas	Joaquín Sabina	
December 27	Vinagre y Rosas	Joaquín Sabina	

== See also ==
- List of number-one singles of 2009 (Spain)
