= Fragile Tension / Hole to Feed =

2009 single by Depeche Mode

"Fragile Tension" / "Hole to Feed"

Single by Depeche Mode

from the album Sounds of the Universe
- Released: 7 December 2009
- Recorded: May–December 2008
- Studio: Sound Design (Santa Barbara, California); Chung King (New York City)
- Length: 4:10/4:00 (album versions); 3:36/3:27 (radio mixes)
- Label: Mute
- Songwriters: Martin Gore ("Fragile Tension"); Dave Gahan; Christian Eigner; Andrew Phillpott ("Hole to Feed")
- Producer: Ben Hillier

Depeche Mode singles chronology
"Peace" (2009)	"Fragile Tension" / "Hole to Feed" (2009)	"Personal Jesus 2011" (2011)

Music videos
- "Fragile Tension" on YouTube
- "Hole to Feed" on YouTube

"Fragile Tension" / "Hole to Feed" are two songs by the English electronic music band Depeche Mode, released on 7 December 2009 as the third single from their twelfth studio album, Sounds of the Universe. A double A-side single, it was not released in the US, nor was it released anywhere else.

"Hole to Feed" is the second Depeche Mode single written by Dave Gahan along with co-writers Christian Eigner and Andrew Phillpott, succeeding the first being "Suffer Well", from their previous album Playing the Angel.

== Background ==
Gahan told The Guardian that "Hole to Feed" is "a very cynical song about wanting to fill a gaping hole but not knowing what to fill it with. About sometimes the idea of having a hole to feed all being a figment of my imagination when I'm actually fine."

Both songs have been slightly edited and remixed for the single. "Fragile Tension" has some new instrumentation and clearer vocals, while "Hole to Feed" has been rearranged and some sections have been removed.

On the band's Tour of the Universe, "Hole to Feed" was played at every show as the 3rd song, always after "Wrong". "Fragile Tension" was performed only once, at a show in Toronto.

== Music videos ==
Music video for Hole to Feed.

The video for "Hole to Feed" debuted in August 2009 and was directed by Eric Wareheim (of Tim and Eric Awesome Show, Great Job!). The video, which does not feature the band at all, received negative feedback from fans on YouTube. It stars Cheyenne Haynes as the lead singer. The "Fragile Tension" video was directed by Rob Chandler and Barney Steel and does not feature the band.

== Track listing ==
=== 12": Mute / 12BONG 42 ===
Released: 21 December 2009

No.	Title	Writer(s)	Length
1.	"Fragile Tension (Stephan Bodzin Remix)"	Martin L. Gore	9:14
2.	"Fragile Tension (Kris Menace's Love on Laserdisc Remix)"	Martin L. Gore	6:24
3.	"Hole to Feed (Popof Vocal Mix)"	Dave Gahan, Christian Eigner, Andrew Phillpott	8:42
4.	"Hole to Feed (Paul Woolford's Easyfun Ethereal Disco Mix)"	Gahan, Eigner, Phillpott	9:24
5.	"Perfect (Roger Sanchez Club Mix)"	Gore	7:24
6.	"Perfect (Ralphi Rosario Dub)"	Gore	8:26
7.	"Peace (Hervé's 'Warehouse Frequencies' Remix)"	Gore	5:10
8.	"Peace (Sander van Doorn Remix)"	Gore	8:02

=== CD: Mute / CDBONG 42 ===
No.	Title	Writer(s)	Length
1.	"Fragile Tension (Radio Mix)"	Gore	3:36
2.	"Hole to Feed (Radio Mix)"	Gahan, Eigner, Phillpott	3:27
3.	"Perfect (Roger Sanchez Club Mix)"	Gore	7:24
4.	"Come Back (SixToes Remix)"	Gahan, Eigner, Phillpott	4:56
5.	"Fragile Tension (Laidback Luke Remix)"	Gore	7:52
6.	"Hole to Feed (Popof Vocal Mix)"	Gahan, Eigner, Phillpott	8:42
7.	"Fragile Tension (Peter Bjorn and John Remix)"	Gore	3:45
8.	"Hole to Feed (Joebot Remix)"	Gahan, Eigner, Phillpott	6:43

=== Digital download: Mute / iBONG 42 ===
No.	Title	Writer(s)	Length
1.	"Fragile Tension (Radio Mix)"	Gore	3:36
2.	"Hole to Feed (Radio Mix)"	Gahan, Eigner, Phillpott	3:27
3.	"Come Back (SixToes Remix)"	Gahan, Eigner, Phillpott	4:56
4.	"Perfect (Ralphi & Craig Club Remix)"	Gore	8:49
5.	"Fragile Tension (Stephan Bodzin Remix)"	Gore	9:14
6.	"Hole to Feed (Paul Woolford's Easyfun Ethereal Disco Mix)"	Gahan, Eigner, Phillpott	9:24
7.	"Perfect (Roger Sanchez Club Mix)"	Gore	7:24
8.	"Fragile Tension (Solo Loves Panorama Remix)"	Gore	6:10
9.	"Hole to Feed (Popof Vocal Mix)"	Gahan, Eigner, Phillpott	8:42

=== iTunes download: Mute / LiBONG 42 ===
No.	Title	Writer(s)	Length
1.	"Fragile Tension (Radio Mix)"	Gore	3:36
2.	"Hole to Feed (Radio Mix)"	Gahan, Eigner, Phillpott	3:27
3.	"Come Back (SixToes Remix)"	Gahan, Eigner, Phillpott	4:56
4.	"Perfect (Ralphi & Craig Club Remix)"	Gore	8:49
5.	"Fragile Tension (Stephan Bodzin Remix)"	Gore	9:14
6.	"Hole to Feed (Paul Woolford's Easyfun Ethereal Disco Mix)"	Gahan, Eigner, Phillpott	9:24
7.	"Perfect (Roger Sanchez Club Mix)"	Gore	7:24
8.	"Fragile Tension (Solo Loves Panorama Remix)"	Gore	6:10
9.	"Hole to Feed (Popof Vocal Mix)"	Gahan, Eigner, Phillpott	8:42
10.	"Perfect (Ralphi & Jody Club Remix)"	Gore	7:39

== Charts ==
Weekly chart performance for "Fragile Tension" / "Hole to Feed"
Chart (2009–2010)	Peak position
France (SNEP)	27
Germany (GfK)	39
