= List of number-one albums of 2009 (Poland) =

These are the Polish number one albums of 2009, per the OLiS Chart.

== Chart history ==
Issue Date	Album	Artist(s)	Reference(s)
January 5	Osiecka	Kasia Nosowska	
January 12	Osiecka	Kasia Nosowska	
January 19	Mamma Mia!	Muzyka filmowa	
January 26	Osiecka	Kasia Nosowska	
February 2	Osiecka	Kasia Nosowska	
February 9	Osiecka	Kasia Nosowska	
February 16	Osiecka	Kasia Nosowska	
February 23	The Best Polish Love Songs... Ever!	Różni wykonawcy	
March 2	The Best Polish Love Songs... Ever!	Różni wykonawcy	
March 9	No Line on the Horizon	U2	
March 16	No Line on the Horizon	U2	
March 23	No Line on the Horizon	U2	
March 30	No Line on the Horizon	U2	
April 6	Quiet Nights	Diana Krall	
April 13	Spis rzeczy ulubionych	Andrzej Piaseczny	
April 20	Quiet Nights	Diana Krall	
April 27	Sounds of the Universe	Depeche Mode	
May 4	Sounds of the Universe	Depeche Mode	
May 11	Sounds of the Universe	Depeche Mode	
May 18	Spis rzeczy ulubionych	Andrzej Piaseczny	
May 25	Spis rzeczy ulubionych	Andrzej Piaseczny	
June 1	Relapse	Eminem	
June 8	Spis rzeczy ulubionych	Andrzej Piaseczny	
June 15	Mały Książę	Michał Żebrowski	
June 22	Feel 2	Feel	
June 29	Anno Domini High Definition	Riverside	
July 6	Thriller - 25th Anniversary Edition	Michael Jackson	
July 13	King of Pop	Michael Jackson	
July 20	King of Pop	Michael Jackson	
July 27	King of Pop	Michael Jackson	
August 3	King of Pop	Michael Jackson	
August 10	King of Pop	Michael Jackson	
August 17	King of Pop	Michael Jackson	
August 24	Evangelion	Behemoth	
August 31	Evangelion	Behemoth	
September 7	Evangelion	Behemoth	
September 14	I Look to You	Whitney Houston	
September 21	Skała	Kayah	
September 28	Skała	Kayah	
October 5	Skała	Kayah	
October 12	Hurra!	Kult	
October 19	Hurra!	Kult	
October 26	Hurra!	Kult	
November 2	Modern Rocking	Agnieszka Chylińska	
November 9	Miłość! Uwaga! Ratunku! Pomocy!	Hey	
November 16	If on a Winter's Night	Sting	
November 23	If on a Winter's Night	Sting	
November 30	If on a Winter's Night	Sting	
December 7	If on a Winter's Night	Sting	
December 14	If on a Winter's Night	Sting	
December 21	My Christmas	Andrea Bocelli	
December 28	My Christmas	Andrea Bocelli	
