= Tour of the Universe (tour) =

2009–10 concert tour by Depeche Mode

- Tour by Depeche Mode
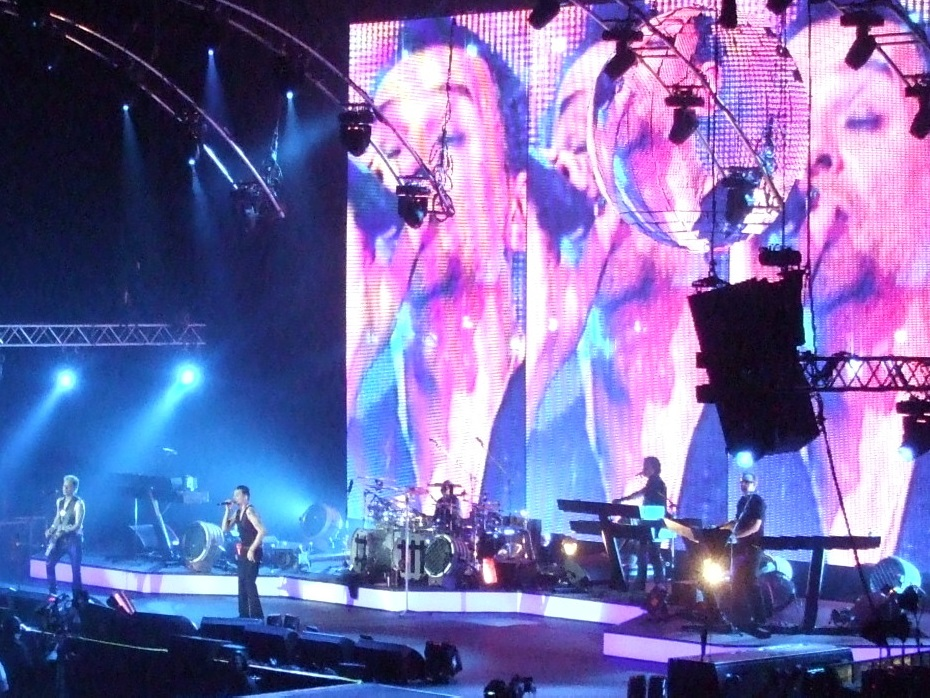
- Depeche Mode performing "It's No Good" at the O_{2} Arena in London on 15 December 2009.
- Associated album: Sounds of the Universe
- Start date: 6 May 2009
- End date: 27 February 2010
- Legs: 7
- No. of shows: 70 in Europe; 26 in North America; 5 in South America; 1 in Asia; 102 in total
- Box office: $133 million

Depeche Mode concert chronology
- Touring the Angel (2005–06); Tour of the Universe (2009–10); The Delta Machine Tour (2013–14)

Tour of the Universe was a 2009–10 worldwide concert tour by English electronic band Depeche Mode in support of the group's 12th studio album, Sounds of the Universe, which was released in April 2009.

The Live Nation-produced tour, which was announced in October 2008 in Berlin, kicked off with a warm-up show in Esch-sur-Alzette, Luxembourg in May 2009. By the end of the year, the tour had reached Europe, Asia, North America and South America.

The concerts in Barcelona, Spain were filmed for the video release Tour of the Universe: Barcelona 20/21.11.09, which was released on 8 November 2010 in Europe and 9 November 2010 in North America on DVD and Blu-ray.

== Overview ==
The tour commenced in May 2009 with a warm-up show in Esch-sur-Alzette, Luxembourg, followed by the first full-fledged date in the Tel Aviv District city of Ramat Gan, Israel. The tour was disrupted as lead singer Dave Gahan was struck by a severe bout of gastroenteritis, which occurred before the band were to take to the stage in Athens. Following subsequent cancellations of eight further shows, the tour was eventually confirmed to recommence in June while Gahan reportedly flew to the United States for treatment; a low-grade malignant tumour in his bladder was found and successfully removed. Although a portion of the cancelled dates were rescheduled, the band's appearance at the Pinkpop Festival in the Netherlands was pulled, while all remaining dates and one of two dates in Leipzig, Germany were cancelled indefinitely due to "scheduling conflicts".

In June 2009, the band played their first show following Gahan's illness in Leipzig, resuming a European leg which eventually wrapped up in Bilbao, Spain. The tour was cut short after Gahan tore a calf muscle, forcing the cancellation of two dates in Porto, Portugal and Seville, Spain respectively.

In July 2009, the group began a tour of the U.S. and Canada. The leg, which featured a headline slot at the Lollapalooza Festival in Chicago, started in Toronto and culminated in Fort Lauderdale, Florida in early September. In August, two dates in California were cancelled after Gahan received doctor's orders to serve a period of complete vocal rest.

In October 2009, the band returned to North America to play four dates in Mexico. The leg continued on to Costa Rica and South America, their first shows in these territories since the Exotic Tour in 1994. The group received attention in the media following the group's performance in Peru after it was reported that Gahan thanked the wrong country. According to reports, Gahan said: "Thank you very much, Chile" towards the end of the concert held in Lima. However, this claim was later disputed by a band representative, who quoted Gahan as saying: "Thank you very much, good night" instead. The leg eventually finished up in Buenos Aires. Later in the month, the act began a European leg of indoor venues, which kicked off in Oberhausen, Germany and culminated mid-December in Manchester, United Kingdom.

In January 2010, the group commenced a third European leg in Berlin. The leg included five shows that were rescheduled following Gahan's illness in the summer of 2009. The tour also included a date as part of a series of concerts in aid of Teenage Cancer Trust, which was held at the Royal Albert Hall in London. During this concert, the performances of "Home", "One Caress" and "Come Back" were accompanied by a seven-piece string section. Additionally, during the encore, former band member Alan Wilder made a surprise appearance onstage, accompanying Martin Gore's performance of "Somebody" on piano. It was the first time Wilder had performed with the band in more than fifteen years, having exited the group in 1995. Speaking about the event, Wilder said that he was "happy to accept" Gahan's proposal to join the group onstage and stated that "[they] were long overdue some kind of reunion of this sort". The entire tour eventually wrapped up in Düsseldorf, Germany in late February, after ten months and 102 shows in 32 countries. In total, the band performed to more than 2.7 million people. As reported by music industry publication Billboard, the tour was one of the most profitable in 2009, ending 20th in the magazine's "Top Tours" list.

Similar to the group's previous tour, Touring the Angel, recordings of some of the tour's concerts were made available on double CD format or as a digital download under the generic name Recording the Universe. A video release of the live concerts held at Palau Sant Jordi in Barcelona, Spain, titled Tour of the Universe: Barcelona 20/21.11.09, was released on 8 November 2010 in Europe and 9 November 2010 in North America on DVD and Blu-ray. The DVD release was issued in two formats, "Deluxe" and "Super Deluxe", which both include two audio CDs of the live concerts. The "Super Deluxe" edition also includes a second DVD featuring the tour documentary, "Inside the Universe", as well as extra bonus materials.

== Set list ==
General set list for Europe, leg #2 and #3

1. Intro (excerpt from "In Chains")
2. "In Chains"
3. "Wrong"
4. "Hole to Feed"
5. "Walking in My Shoes"
6. "It's No Good"
7. "A Question of Time"
8. "World in My Eyes"
9. "Precious"
10. "Fly on the Windscreen"
11. Song performed by Martin Gore
  - "Freelove"
  - "Clean" (Bare version)
  - "Dressed in Black" (Acoustic)
  - "Sister of Night"
  - "Jezebel"
  - "Insight" (Acoustic)
  - "Judas" (Acoustic)
  - "One Caress"
12. Song performed by Martin Gore
  - "Home" (Acoustic)
  - "Miles Away/The Truth Is"
  - "Come Back"
13. "Policy of Truth"
14. "In Your Room" (Zephyr mix (with bits from the album version))
15. "I Feel You"
16. "Enjoy the Silence"
17. "Never Let Me Down Again"
18. Song performed by Martin Gore
  - "Somebody"
  - "A Question of Lust" (Acoustic)
  - "Dressed in Black" (Acoustic)
  - "One Caress"
19. "Stripped"
  - "Behind the Wheel"
  - "Photographic"
20. "Personal Jesus

Note: Set lists differed between dates, with rotated songs (denoted above), possible minor song order changes and song omissions.

== Tour dates ==
List of concerts, showing date, city, country, and venue
Date	City	Country	Venue/Event
Europe
6 May 2009	Esch-sur-Alzette	Luxembourg	Rockhal
Asia
10 May 2009	Tel Aviv	Israel	Ramat Gan Stadium
Europe
8 June 2009	Leipzig	Germany	Zentralstadion
10 June 2009	Berlin	Germany	Olympiastadion
12 June 2009	Frankfurt	Germany	Commerzbank-Arena
13 June 2009	Munich	Germany	Olympiastadion
16 June 2009	Rome	Italy	Stadio Olimpico
18 June 2009	Milan	Italy	Stadio Giuseppe Meazza
20 June 2009	Werchter	Belgium	Festivalpark (TW Classic Festival)
22 June 2009	Bratislava	Slovakia	Štadión Pasienky
23 June 2009	Budapest	Hungary	Ferenc Puskás Stadium
25 June 2009	Prague	Czech Republic	Synot Tip Arena
27 June 2009	Saint-Denis	France	Stade de France
28 June 2009	Nancy	France	Zénith de Nancy
30 June 2009	Copenhagen	Denmark	Parken Stadium
1 July 2009	Hamburg	Germany	HSH Nordbank Arena
3 July 2009	Arvika	Sweden	Folkets Park (Arvika Festival)
6 July 2009	Carcassonne	France	Esplanade Gambetta
8 July 2009	Valladolid	Spain	Estadio Nuevo José Zorrilla
9 July 2009	Bilbao	Spain	Monte Cobetas (Bilbao BBK Live)
North America
24 July 2009	Toronto	Canada	Molson Canadian Amphitheatre
25 July 2009	Montreal	Canada	Bell Centre
28 July 2009	Bristow	United States	Nissan Pavilion
31 July 2009	Mansfield	United States	Comcast Center
1 August 2009	Atlantic City	United States	Borgata Event Center
3 August 2009	New York City	United States	Madison Square Garden
4 August 2009	New York City	United States	Madison Square Garden
7 August 2009	Chicago	United States	Grant Park (Lollapalooza)
10 August 2009	Seattle	United States	KeyArena
16 August 2009	Los Angeles	United States	Hollywood Bowl
17 August 2009	Los Angeles	United States	Hollywood Bowl
19 August 2009	Anaheim	United States	Honda Center
20 August 2009	Santa Barbara	United States	Santa Barbara Bowl
22 August 2009	Paradise	United States	Pearl Concert Theater
23 August 2009	Phoenix	United States	US Airways Center
25 August 2009	West Valley City	United States	The E Center
27 August 2009	Morrison	United States	Red Rocks Amphitheatre
29 August 2009	Dallas	United States	SuperPages.com Center
30 August 2009	The Woodlands	United States	Cynthia Woods Mitchell Pavilion
1 September 2009	Atlanta	United States	Aaron's Amphitheatre at Lakewood
4 September 2009	Tampa	United States	Ford Amphitheatre
5 September 2009	Sunrise	United States	BankAtlantic Center
1 October 2009	Guadalajara	Mexico	Arena VFG
3 October 2009	Mexico City	Mexico	Foro Sol
4 October 2009	Mexico City	Mexico	Foro Sol
6 October 2009	Monterrey	Mexico	Monterrey Arena
Central America
8 October 2009	Alajuela	Costa Rica	Autódromo La Guácima
South America
10 October 2009	Bogotá	Colombia	Simón Bolívar Park
13 October 2009	Lima	Peru	Explanada del Estadio Monumental
15 October 2009	Santiago	Chile	Club Hípico de Santiago
17 October 2009	Buenos Aires	Argentina	Parque de la Ciudad
Europe
31 October 2009	Oberhausen	Germany	König Pilsener Arena
1 November 2009	Bremen	Germany	AWD-Dome
3 November 2009	Hanover	Germany	TUI Arena
7 November 2009	Mannheim	Germany	SAP Arena
8 November 2009	Stuttgart	Germany	Hanns-Martin-Schleyer-Halle
10 November 2009	Geneva	Switzerland	Palexpo
12 November 2009	Valencia	Spain	Recinto Ferial
14 November 2009	Lisbon	Portugal	Pavilhão Atlântico
16 November 2009	Madrid	Spain	Palacio de Deportes
17 November 2009	Madrid	Spain	Palacio de Deportes
20 November 2009	Barcelona	Spain	Palau Sant Jordi
21 November 2009	Barcelona	Spain	Palau Sant Jordi
23 November 2009	Lyon	France	Halle Tony Garnier
25 November 2009	Casalecchio di Reno	Italy	Futurshow Station
26 November 2009	Turin	Italy	Torino Palasport Olimpico
28 November 2009	Erfurt	Germany	Messehalle
30 November 2009	Rotterdam	Netherlands	Rotterdam Ahoy
1 December 2009	Nuremberg	Germany	Nuremberg Arena
3 December 2009	Vienna	Austria	Wiener Stadthalle
6 December 2009	Zürich	Switzerland	Hallenstadion
7 December 2009	Zürich	Switzerland	Hallenstadion
10 December 2009	Dublin	Ireland	The O_{2}
12 December 2009	Glasgow	Scotland	SECC
13 December 2009	Birmingham	England	LG Arena
15 December 2009	London	England	O_{2} Arena
16 December 2009	London	England	O_{2} Arena
18 December 2009	Manchester	England	Manchester Evening News Arena
9 January 2010	Berlin	Germany	O_{2} World
11 January 2010	Budapest	Hungary	László Papp Budapest Sports Arena
14 January 2010	Prague	Czech Republic	O_{2} Arena
17 January 2010	Liévin	France	Stade Couvert Régional
19 January 2010	Paris	France	Palais Omnisports Bercy
20 January 2010	Paris	France	Palais Omnisports Bercy
23 January 2010	Antwerp	Belgium	Sportpaleis
25 January 2010	Malmö	Sweden	Malmö Arena
26 January 2010	Gothenburg	Sweden	Scandinavium
29 January 2010	Bergen	Norway	Vestlandshallen
31 January 2010	Stockholm	Sweden	Ericsson Globe
2 February 2010	Helsinki	Finland	Hartwall Arena
4 February 2010	Saint Petersburg	Russia	CKK Arena
6 February 2010	Moscow	Russia	Olympic Stadium
8 February 2010	Kyiv	Ukraine	Palace of Sports
10 February 2010	Łódź	Poland	Atlas Arena
11 February 2010	Łódź	Poland	Atlas Arena
14 February 2010	Zagreb	Croatia	Arena Zagreb
17 February 2010	London	England	Royal Albert Hall
20 February 2010	London	England	O_{2} Arena
22 February 2010	Horsens	Denmark	Forum Horsens
23 February 2010	Horsens	Denmark	Forum Horsens
26 February 2010	Düsseldorf	Germany	Esprit Arena
27 February 2010	Düsseldorf	Germany	Esprit Arena

== Support acts ==
- Angele Phase (Bogotá)
- Dolcenera (Milan)
- Feedbackers (Lima)
- Gomo (Lisbon)
- The Horrors (London (17 February 2010))
- Lavagance (Bratislava)
- M83 (8–18 June 2009; 27 and 28 June 2009)
- MOTOR (6 May 2009; 22–25 June 2009; 30 June – 8 July 2009)
- Nitzer Ebb (9 January – 27 February 2010, excl. 17 February 2010 (London))
- Terry Poison (Tel Aviv)
- Peter Bjorn and John (24 July – 5 September 2009)
- Polarkreis 18 (Leipzig and Berlin (10 June 2009))
- Quiero Club (Mexico City (3 October 2009))
- The Raveonettes (Mexico City (4 October 2009))
- Soulsavers (31 October – 18 December 2009, excl. 14 November 2009 (Lisbon))
- Yeah Yeah Yeahs (Tel Aviv)
- Žagar (Budapest (23 June 2009))

== Musicians ==
=== Depeche Mode ===
- Dave Gahan – lead vocals
- Martin Gore – guitar, synthesizers, lead and backing vocals
- Andy Fletcher – synthesizers

=== Additional musicians ===
- Peter Gordeno – synthesizers, piano, backing vocals
- Christian Eigner – drums, synthesizers
