= List of Billboard number-one electronic albums of 2009 =

These are the albums that reached number one on the Billboard Dance/Electronic Albums chart in 2009.

== Chart history ==
Key
| † | Indicates best-performing album of 2009 |

| Issue date | Album | Artist | Reference |
|---|---|---|---|
| January 3 | The Fame † | Lady Gaga | |
| January 10 | The Fame † | Lady Gaga | |
| January 17 | The Fame † | Lady Gaga | |
| January 24 | The Fame † | Lady Gaga | |
| January 31 | Slumdog Millionaire | A. R. Rahman | |
| February 7 | Slumdog Millionaire | A. R. Rahman | |
| February 14 | The Fame † | Lady Gaga | |
| February 21 | The Fame † | Lady Gaga | |
| February 28 | The Fame † | Lady Gaga | |
| March 7 | The Fame † | Lady Gaga | |
| March 14 | Slumdog Millionaire | A. R. Rahman | |
| March 21 | The Fame † | Lady Gaga | |
| March 28 | The Fame † | Lady Gaga | |
| April 4 | The Fame † | Lady Gaga | |
| April 11 | The Fame † | Lady Gaga | |
| April 18 | The Fame † | Lady Gaga | |
| April 25 | The Fame † | Lady Gaga | |
| May 2 | The Fame † | Lady Gaga | |
| May 9 | Sounds of the Universe | Depeche Mode | |
| May 16 | The Fame † | Lady Gaga | |
| May 23 | The Fame † | Lady Gaga | |
| May 30 | The Fame † | Lady Gaga | |
| June 6 | The Fame † | Lady Gaga | |
| June 13 | The Fame † | Lady Gaga | |
| June 20 | The Fame † | Lady Gaga | |
| June 27 | The Fame † | Lady Gaga | |
| July 4 | The Fame † | Lady Gaga | |
| July 11 | The Fame † | Lady Gaga | |
| July 18 | The Fame † | Lady Gaga | |
| July 25 | The Fame † | Lady Gaga | |
| August 1 | The Fame † | Lady Gaga | |
| August 8 | The Fame † | Lady Gaga | |
| August 15 | The Fame † | Lady Gaga | |
| August 22 | The Fame † | Lady Gaga | |
| August 29 | The Fame † | Lady Gaga | |
| September 5 | The Fame † | Lady Gaga | |
| September 12 | Ellipse | Imogen Heap | |
| September 19 | The Fame † | Lady Gaga | |
| September 26 | The Fame † | Lady Gaga | |
| October 3 | The Fame † | Lady Gaga | |
| October 10 | The Fame † | Lady Gaga | |
| October 17 | The Fame † | Lady Gaga | |
| October 24 | The Fame † | Lady Gaga | |
| October 31 | The Fame † | Lady Gaga | |
| November 7 | Ocean Eyes | Owl City | |
| November 14 | Ocean Eyes | Owl City | |
| November 21 | Ocean Eyes | Owl City | |
| November 28 | Ocean Eyes | Owl City | |
| December 5 | The Fame † | Lady Gaga | |
| December 12 | The Fame Monster | Lady Gaga | |
| December 19 | The Fame † | Lady Gaga | |
| December 26 | The Fame † | Lady Gaga | |
