= Peace (Depeche Mode song) =

2009 single by Depeche Mode

Single by Depeche Mode

from the album Sounds of the Universe
- B-side: "Come Back" (Jónsi remix) (7" only)
- Released: 15 June 2009
- Recorded: May–December 2008
- Studio: Sound Design (Santa Barbara, California); Chung King (New York City)
- Genre: Synth-pop
- Length: 4:28 (album version); 3:36 (single version)
- Label: Mute
- Songwriter: Martin L. Gore
- Producer: Ben Hillier

Depeche Mode singles chronology
"Wrong" (2009)	"Peace" (2009)	"Fragile Tension" / "Hole to Feed" (2009)

Music video
- "Peace" on YouTube

"Peace" is a song by English electronic music band Depeche Mode, released on 15 June 2009 as the second single from their twelfth studio album, Sounds of the Universe (2009). It is the first Depeche Mode single not to be issued on 12" vinyl since "Dreaming of Me" in 1981.

== Background ==
Martin Gore told The Sun newspaper that he thought "Peace" is one of his favourite songs that he has ever written. He explained that both "Peace" and "Little Soul", "give the album a kind of thread. Both of those songs have a real spiritual feel, though we have to be really careful using that word." The song charted at #57 in the UK charts, equal to their first ever single, "Dreaming of Me" in 1981. This is the band's second lowest UK Singles Chart position after "Little 15", originally intended to be a France-only release which reached #60 upon limited UK release in 1988. In Germany, "Peace" reached #25.

The music video for "Peace" was filmed in Negoiești, Prahova, Romania by French duo Jonas & François, it features Romanian actress Maria Dinulescu and marks the first Depeche Mode video to not include any of the band members (because of Dave Gahan's illness), save for a promotional poster near the end.

== Track listing ==
7": Mute / BONG 41
No.	Title	Writer(s)	Length
1.	"Peace" (single version)	Martin L. Gore	3:36
2.	"Come Back" (Jónsi remix)	Dave Gahan; Christian Eigner; Andrew Phillpott	4:04

CD: Mute / CDBONG 41
No.	Title	Length
1.	"Peace" (single version)	3:36
2.	"Peace" (SixToes remix)	5:14

CD: Mute / LCDBONG 41
No.	Title	Length
1.	"Peace" (single version)	3:36
2.	"Peace" (Hervé's 'Warehouse Frequencies' remix)	5:10
3.	"Peace" (Sander van Doorn remix)	8:02
4.	"Peace" (Japanese Popstars remix)	6:46
5.	"Peace" (Sid LeRock remix)	6:35
6.	"Peace" (Justus Köhncke extended disco club vocal remix)	6:24

== Charts ==
Weekly chart performance for "Peace"
Chart (2009)	Peak position
Austria (Ö3 Austria Top 40)	72
Czech Republic Airplay (ČNS IFPI)	60
European Hot 100 Singles (Billboard)	45
France (SNEP)	18
Germany (GfK)	25
Israel International Airplay (Media Forest)	6
Italy (Musica e dischi)	45
Sweden (Sverigetopplistan)	59
Switzerland (Schweizer Hitparade)	53
UK Singles (OCC)	57
