= Sounds of the Universe =

2009 studio album by Depeche Mode

Studio album by Depeche Mode
- Released: 17 April 2009
- Recorded: May–December 2008
- Studios: Sound Design (Santa Barbara, California); Chung King (New York City)
- Genres: Synth-pop; electro-rock
- Length: 60:52
- Label: Mute
- Producer: Ben Hillier

Depeche Mode chronology
The Best of Depeche Mode Volume 1 (2006)	Sounds of the Universe (2009)	Recording the Universe (2009)

Singles from Sounds of the Universe
- 1. "Wrong" Released: 6 April 2009; 2. "Peace" Released: 15 June 2009; 3. "Perfect" Released: 15 June 2009 (US); 4. "Fragile Tension" / "Hole to Feed" Released: 7 December 2009

Sounds of the Universe is the twelfth studio album by the English electronic music band Depeche Mode, released on 17 April 2009 by Mute Records. The album was supported by the 2009–10 Tour of the Universe. Three singles were released from the album: "Wrong", "Peace", and a double A-side of "Fragile Tension" and "Hole to Feed". "Perfect" was also released in the United States as a promotional single.

The album was released by Virgin Records and Capitol Records in the United States and by EMI in Canada and Mexico, marking the first time in the band's catalog that saw distribution from EMI within North America, where previous albums were released by Sire Records and Reprise Records, both divisions of Warner Music Group.

== Background and composition ==
While Dave Gahan was still busy with his solo album Hourglass (2007), Martin Gore was in his home studio in Santa Barbara, California, working on new songs. In May 2008, the band went to the studio to record their twelfth studio album. Ben Hillier took the production reins again, because the band were so satisfied with their previous collaboration on Playing the Angel (2005). As with their previous album Playing the Angel, Gahan once again wrote three songs with Christian Eigner and Andrew Phillpott: "Hole to Feed", "Come Back", and "Miles Away/The Truth Is". Gore shares lead vocal duties with Gahan on "In Chains", "Wrong", "Peace", and "Perfect". The band described the time in the studio as very productive, a total of 22 songs were created and it was difficult to choose the right songs for the album. Five of the songs not used on the album were released as part of the deluxe box set. Short video clips of the band and production team at work in the studio were regularly posted on the band's homepage. This would be the first time that the band would openly post detailed clips of their recording process on social media.

Music video for the song Hole to Feed

Lyrically, the album features personal lyrics. Gahan explained that the song "Hole to Feed" was written about the desire to fill a metaphorical hole but not knowing what to fill it up with. The song "Wrong" was described by Gore to have a bit of black humor in its lyrics but doesn't want people to find it depressing.

== Reception ==
Professional ratings
Aggregate scores
Source	Rating
AnyDecentMusic?	6.5/10
Metacritic	70/100
Review scores
Source	Rating
AllMusic	3.5/5 stars
The A.V. Club	A−
Entertainment Weekly	B+
Los Angeles Times	3/4 stars
NME	7/10
Pitchfork	6.3/10
PopMatters	5/10
Rolling Stone	2.5/5 stars
Spin	3/5 stars
The Times	4/5 stars

Sounds of the Universe received generally positive reviews from music critics. At Metacritic, which assigns a normalised rating out of 100 to reviews from mainstream publications, the album received an average score of 70, based on 28 reviews. Entertainment Weekly's Leah Greenblatt stated that on Sounds of the Universe, Depeche Mode "still sound genuinely inspired" and Ned Raggett of AllMusic concluded, "Sounds of the Universe is a grower, relying on a few listens to fully take effect, but when it does, it shows Depeche Mode are still able to combine pop-hook accessibility and their own take on 'roots' music for an electronic age with sonic experimentation and recombination." Neil McCormick of The Daily Telegraph noted that the album "shows up the imaginative constraints of most guitar-based rock."

However, Rolling Stone critic Melissa Maerz felt that "the result sounds like a time machine back to the Eighties", adding that "Depeche Mode should be poised for a comeback, but it's too soon to unpack those black turtlenecks." Bill Stewart of PopMatters wrote that Depeche Mode "tempt us with a strong first half and then dump us in a collection of tossed off b-sides." Jon Caramanica wrote for The New York Times that while the album "lacks the fragility of 1984's Some Great Reward or the earned attitude of 1990's Violator, it's unmistakably an attempt at revisiting the past, admirable either as an act of defiant stubbornness or tenacious commitment", but also opined that "even at its most imaginative, this is seamless Depeche Mode filler, music that could be made by any number of acolytes."

Sounds of the Universe debuted at number two on the UK Albums Chart with first-week sales of 30,537 copies—the band's highest-peaking album since chart-topping Ultra (1997). However, it is their first album in their career not to contain a top 20 hit single in their homeland country. In the United States, the album debuted at number three on the Billboard 200, selling 80,000 units in its first week. The album was ultimately ranked number 200 on the Billboard 200-year-end chart for 2009, and had sold 193,000 copies in the US by November 2012, according to Nielsen SoundScan.

Sounds of the Universe was nominated for Best Alternative Music Album at the 2010 Grammy Awards, but lost out to Phoenix's Wolfgang Amadeus Phoenix. The album's sleeve design was voted number ten on the 2009 Best Art Vinyl poll.

=== Accolades ===
Publication	Accolade	Year	Rank
Consequence of Sound	The Top 100 Albums of '09	2013	42

== Track listing ==
All tracks are written by Martin L. Gore, except where noted. All lead vocals by Dave Gahan, except where noted.

No.	Title	Writer(s)	Lead vocals	Length
1.	"In Chains"			6:53
2.	"Hole to Feed"	Gahan; Christian Eigner; Andrew Phillpott		3:59
3.	"Wrong"		Gahan, Gore	3:13
4.	"Fragile Tension"			4:09
5.	"Little Soul"			3:31
6.	"In Sympathy"			4:54
7.	"Peace"		Gahan, Gore	4:29
8.	"Come Back"	Gahan; Eigner; Phillpott		5:15
9.	"Spacewalker"		instrumental	1:53
10.	"Perfect"		Gahan, Gore	4:33
11.	"Miles Away/The Truth Is"	Gahan; Eigner; Phillpott		4:14
12.	"Jezebel"		Gore	4:41
13.	"Corrupt" (includes the hidden track "Interlude #5", starting at 8:16, after 3 minutes of silence)			8:59
Total length:				60:52

Japanese edition bonus track
No.	Title	Writer(s)	Length
14.	"Oh Well"	Gore; Gahan	5:59

iTunes Store bonus track
No.	Title	Length
14.	"Oh Well" (Black Light Odyssey Dub)	5:02

iTunes Store deluxe edition bonus tracks
No.	Title	Length
15.	"Oh Well" (Black Light Odyssey Dub)	5:02
16.	"Jezebel" (SixToes Remix)	5:31
17.	"Little Soul" (Thomas Fehlmann Flowing Ambient Mix)	9:19
18.	"In Chains" (Minilogue's Earth Remix)	7:53
19.	"Wrong" (music video)	3:23
20.	"Sounds of the Universe – A Short Film" (video)	10:05

=== LP+CD ===
Contains the standard 13-track album on two LPs, as well as a CD of the album (as per the standard CD).

=== Special edition CD+DVD ===
Contains the standard 13-track album, plus a bonus DVD with exclusive features:

Video

- Sounds of the Universe (A Short Film) – 10:05
- Wrong (Promo Video) – 3:16

Audio

- Sounds of the Universe in 5.1 surround sound
- "In Chains" (Minilogue's Earth Remix)
- "Little Soul" (Thomas Fehlmann Flowing Ambient Mix)
- "Jezebel" (SixToes Remix)

=== iTunes Pass version ===
With iTunes Pass, fans receive new and exclusive singles, remixes, video and other content from Sounds of the Universe over a set period of time, delivered to their libraries as soon as they're available. In addition, the iTunes standard pre-order release of Sounds of the Universe contained "Oh Well" (Black Light Odyssey Dub) as track 14, along with an exclusive edit of "Wrong" called the Trentemøller Remix Edit as track 15.

The iTunes Pass track listing contained the standard 13-track album, plus the following:

- "Oh Well" (Black Light Odyssey Dub) – 5:02
- "Wrong" (music video) – 3:23
- "The Sun and the Moon and the Stars" (Electronic Periodic's Microdrum Mix) – 4:04
- "Miles Away/The Truth Is" (Lagos Boys Choir Remix) – 4:06
- "Wrong" (Thin White Duke Remix) – 7:41
- "Wrong" (Magda's Scallop Funk Remix) – 6:23
- "Wrong" (D.I.M. vs. Boys Noize Remix) – 5:09
- Sounds of the Universe (A Short Film) – 10:05
- "Wrong" (Trentemøller Remix Edit) – 5:45
- "Jezebel" (SixToes Remix) – 5:32
- "Little Soul" (Thomas Fehlmann Flowing Ambient Mix) – 9:20
- "In Chains" (Minilogue's Earth Remix) – 7:54
- "Corrupt" (Studio Session) – 4:54
- "Little Soul" (Studio Session) – 3:57
- "Little Soul" (Thomas Fehlmann Flowing Funk Dub) – 10:03
- "Peace" (Hervé's 'Warehouse Frequencies' Remix) – 5:10
- "Peace" (The Japanese Pop Stars Remix) – 6:41
- "In Sympathy" (Live in Tel Aviv) – 5:18
- "Walking in My Shoes" (Live in Tel Aviv) – 6:24

=== Deluxe box set edition ===
The Deluxe Box Set Edition of Sounds of the Universe

Includes three CDs containing the album, bonus songs and remixes, as well as 14 exclusive demos ranging from as far back as the Music for the Masses era. It also contains a DVD featuring three films, a promo video for "Wrong", four songs filmed live in the studio in December 2008, and the album and bonus tracks mastered in 5.1 surround. The box set also includes two 84-page hardback books, the first featuring lyrics to all the songs from the Sounds of the Universe sessions, along with exclusive photography by Anton Corbijn, and the second containing exclusive and candid studio photography by Daniel Miller, Ben Hillier, Luke Smith and Ferg Peterkin. In addition, the box set includes two enamel badges, five artcards sealed in a collector's envelope, a poster, and a certificate of authenticity.

CD 2 – Bonus Tracks & Remixes

1. "Light" – 4:44
2. "The Sun and the Moon and the Stars" – 4:41
3. "Ghost" – 6:26
4. "Esque" – 2:17
5. "Oh Well" (Gore, Gahan) – 6:02
6. "Corrupt (Efdemin Remix)" – 6:29
7. "In Chains (Minilogue's Earth Remix)" – 7:54
8. "Little Soul (Thomas Fehlmann Flowing Ambient Mix)" – 9:20
9. "Jezebel (SixToes Remix)" – 5:33
10. "Perfect (Electronic Periodic's Dark Drone Mix)" – 5:21
11. "Wrong (Caspa Remix)" – 5:04

CD 3 – Demos

1. "Little 15" – 4:16 (Music for the Masses, 1987)
2. "Clean" – 3:42 (Violator, 1990)
3. "Sweetest Perfection" – 3:23 (Violator, 1990)
4. "Walking in My Shoes" – 3:22 (Songs of Faith and Devotion, 1993)
5. "I Feel You" – 4:03 (Songs of Faith and Devotion, 1993)
6. "Judas" – 3:25 (Songs of Faith and Devotion, 1993)
7. "Surrender" – 5:00 ("Only When I Lose Myself" B-side 1, 1998)
8. "Only When I Lose Myself" – 5:22 (The Singles 86>98, 1998)
9. "Nothing's Impossible" – 5:02 (Playing the Angel, 2005)
10. "Corrupt" – 4:41 (Sounds of the Universe, 2009)
11. "Peace" – 4:33 (Sounds of the Universe, 2009)
12. "Jezebel" – 4:38 (Sounds of the Universe, 2009)
13. "Come Back" – 5:09 (Sounds of the Universe, 2009)
14. "In Chains" – 4:33 (Sounds of the Universe, 2009)

DVD

- Making the Universe / Film – 45:23
- Usual Thing, Try and Get the Question in the Answer – 55:12
- Sounds of the Universe (A Short Film) – 10:05
- Wrong (Promo Video) – 3:16
- Studio Sessions:
1. "Corrupt" – 4:08 (Sounds of the Universe, 2009)
2. "Little Soul" – 3:52 (Sounds of the Universe, 2009)
3. "Stories of Old" – 3:24 (Some Great Reward, 1984)
4. "Come Back" – 6:05 (Sounds of the Universe, 2009)
- Audio: Sounds of the Universe plus bonus tracks in 5.1 surround sound

Packaging/additional content

- Two-piece custom made box with foil blocking.
- 2× 84 page hardback books: The first featuring the lyrics to all the songs from the Sounds of the Universe sessions accompanied by exclusive photography by Anton Corbijn. The second featuring exclusive and candid studio photography by Daniel Miller, Ben Hillier, Luke Smith and Ferg Peterkin.
- Two exclusive enamel badges
- Poster
- Five artcards, sealed in a collectors envelope
- Certificate of authenticity

== Personnel ==
Credits adapted from the liner notes of Sounds of the Universe.

=== Depeche Mode ===
- Martin Gore
- Andy Fletcher
- Dave Gahan

=== Additional musicians ===
- Luke Smith – programming
- Christian Eigner – original programming (tracks 2, 8, 11); drums (tracks 2, 4)
- Andrew Phillpott – original programming (tracks 2, 8, 11)

=== Technical ===
- Ben Hillier – production
- Tony Hoffer – mixing at Chung King Studios (New York City)
- Ferg Peterkin – engineering
- Josh Garcia – engineering assistance
- Jesse Gladstone – engineering assistance
- Anthony Palazzole – engineering assistance
- Sie Medway-Smith – pre-production assistance
- Stephen Marcussen – mastering at Marcussen Mastering (Hollywood, California)

=== Artwork ===
- Anton Corbijn – art direction, photography, cover design
- ShaughnessyWorks – design
- Tea Design – artwork

== Charts ==
=== Weekly charts ===
Weekly chart performance for Sounds of the Universe
Chart (2009)	Peak position
Australian Albums (ARIA)	32
Austrian Albums (Ö3 Austria)	1
Belgian Albums (Ultratop Flanders)	2
Belgian Albums (Ultratop Wallonia)	2
Canadian Albums (Billboard)	3
Croatian Albums (HDU)	1
Czech Albums (ČNS IFPI)	1
Danish Albums (Hitlisten)	1
Dutch Albums (Album Top 100)	7
European Albums (Billboard)	1
Finnish Albums (Suomen virallinen lista)	1
French Albums (SNEP)	2
German Albums (Offizielle Top 100)	1
Greek International Albums (IFPI)	1
Hungarian Albums (MAHASZ)	1
Irish Albums (IRMA)	3
Italian Albums (FIMI)	1
Japanese Albums (Oricon)	31
Mexican Albums (Top 100 Mexico)	1
New Zealand Albums (RMNZ)	31
Norwegian Albums (VG-lista)	2
Polish Albums (ZPAV)	1
Portuguese Albums (AFP)	2
Russian Albums (2M)	1
Scottish Albums (Official Charts)	2
Spanish Albums (Promusicae)	1
Swedish Albums (Sverigetopplistan)	1
Swiss Albums (Schweizer Hitparade)	1
UK Albums (Official Charts)	2
US Billboard 200	3
US Top Alternative Albums (Billboard)	1
US Top Dance Albums (Billboard)	1
US Top Rock Albums (Billboard)	1

=== Year-end charts ===
Year-end chart performance for Sounds of the Universe
Chart (2009)	Position
Austrian Albums (Ö3 Austria)	53
Belgian Albums (Ultratop Flanders)	49
Belgian Albums (Ultratop Wallonia)	9
Danish Albums (Hitlisten)	34
European Albums (Billboard)	20
French Albums (SNEP)	37
German Albums (Offizielle Top 100)	5
Hungarian Albums (MAHASZ)	16
Italian Albums (FIMI)	25
Mexican Albums (Top 100 Mexico)	65
Polish Albums (ZPAV)	14
Swedish Albums (Sverigetopplistan)	63
Swedish Albums & Compilations (Sverigetopplistan)	93
Swiss Albums (Schweizer Hitparade)	23
US Billboard 200	200
US Top Alternative Albums (Billboard)	36
US Top Dance/Electronic Albums (Billboard)	5
US Top Rock Albums (Billboard)	48

== Certifications ==
Certifications for Sounds of the Universe
Region	Certification	Certified units/sales
Austria (IFPI Austria)	Gold	10,000^{*}
Belgium (BRMA)	Platinum	30,000^{*}
Denmark (IFPI Danmark)	Gold	15,000^{^}
France (SNEP)	Platinum	100,000^{*}
Germany (BVMI)	3× Gold	300,000^{^}
Hungary (MAHASZ)	Gold	3,000^{^}
Italy (FIMI)	Platinum	70,000^{*}
Mexico (AMPROFON)	Gold	40,000^{^}
Russia (NFPF)	Platinum	20,000^{*}
Sweden (GLF)	Gold	20,000^{^}
Switzerland (IFPI Switzerland)	Platinum	30,000^{^}
United Kingdom (BPI)	Silver	60,000^{^}
Summaries
Worldwide	—	1,100,000
^{*} Sales figures based on certification alone.^{^} Shipments figures based on certification alone.

== Release history ==
Release history for Sounds of the Universe
Region	Date	Label	Ref.
Australia	17 April 2009	EMI	
Germany	17 April 2009	EMI	
Italy	17 April 2009	EMI	
France	20 April 2009	EMI	
Sweden	20 April 2009	EMI	
United Kingdom	20 April 2009	Mute	
Canada	21 April 2009	EMI	
United States	21 April 2009	Mute; Capitol; Virgin	
Japan	22 April 2009	EMI	

== See also ==
- List of Billboard number-one electronic albums of 2009
- List of European number-one hits of 2009
- List of number-one albums of 2009 (Finland)
- List of number-one albums of 2009 (Mexico)
- List of number-one albums of 2009 (Poland)
- List of number-one albums of 2009 (Spain)
- List of number-one hits of 2009 (Austria)
- List of number-one hits of 2009 (Germany)
- List of number-one hits of 2009 (Italy)
