= Wrong (Depeche Mode song) =

2009 single by Depeche Mode

Single by Depeche Mode

from the album Sounds of the Universe
- B-side: "Oh Well"
- Released: 6 April 2009
- Studio: Sound Design (Santa Barbara, California); Chung King (New York City)
- Genre: Synth-pop
- Length: 3:13
- Label: Mute; Capitol, Virgin (US)
- Songwriter: Martin L. Gore
- Producer: Ben Hillier

Depeche Mode singles chronology
"Martyr" (2006)	"Wrong" (2009)	"Peace" (2009)

Music video
- "Wrong" on YouTube

"Wrong" is a song by English electronic music band Depeche Mode, released as the first single from their twelfth studio album, Sounds of the Universe (2009). It was released to radio in February 2009 and became available for purchase online on 24 February 2009. The single was physically released on 6 April 2009. The 12-inch version of the single was released on 11 May 2009. B-side "Oh Well" (which also appears on the Sounds of the Universe deluxe box set edition) is the first writing collaboration between Martin Gore (music) and Dave Gahan (lyrics).

Commercially, the single reached number one in Scotland and entered the top 10 in nine countries worldwide, including France, Germany, Italy, and Sweden. In the UK, it is Depeche Mode's most recent top-40 hit, peaking at number 24 on the UK Singles Chart. It also found some chart success in North America, peaking at number 64 in Canada and number one on the US Billboard Dance Club Songs chart.

== Chart performance ==
"Wrong" has received a positive response on United States alternative rock radio, becoming one of the 30 most-played songs in its first week of release. "Wrong" was added to the BBC Radio 6 "B-List" playlist for the week starting 7 March 2009. However, a week after physical release in April 2009, it charted at number 24 (and currently remaining their last UK Top 40 hit), the lowest UK chart position for the initial single from a Depeche Mode studio album ("Dreaming of Me", while charting at number 57 in 1981, was not an "official" track from the Speak & Spell album). By contrast, Sounds of the Universe itself reached number two in the UK upon release in late April, Depeche Mode's highest album chart position there since 1997. Likewise, "Wrong" was more successful in Scotland, topping the Scottish Singles Chart to become the band's first and only number-one single in that country. Elsewhere, the song reached the top 10 in several European countries, including Denmark, Finland, Germany, Italy, and Sweden. In North America, the song reached number 64 in Canada and number one on the US Dance Club Songs chart.

== Music video ==
The music video for "Wrong" was filmed in December 2008 and directed by Patrick Daughters. It debuted on the band's MySpace page on 20 February 2009. The video depicts a Ford Crown Victoria rolling backwards down a Los Angeles downtown street, seemingly with no driver at the wheel. A shot inside the car reveals a man in a latex mask lying unconscious in the front seat, played by Liars drummer Julian Gross. When the car bumps another car (but keeps rolling), the man is jolted awake. As he tries in desperation to stop the car, it becomes apparent that he is bound and gagged. The car rolls past the band (watching from a sidewalk) and hits a pedestrian, trash cans, shopping carts, and traffic cones. A police vehicle begins pursuing the car. When the man finally manages to free his wrists and remove the mask, a white pickup truck crashes into the side of the car, bringing it to a halt.

On 3 December 2009, the video was nominated for a Grammy Award for Best Short Form Video. On the same day, Sounds of the Universe, the album of which the single appears on, was nominated for Best Alternative Music Album. The video was listed second on Time magazine's list of the "Five Best Videos of 2009" and was ranked 10th on "The 20 Best Videos of 2009" according to Spin Magazine.

== Track listing ==
European CD single

1. "Wrong" – 3:13
2. "Oh Well" (Black Light Odyssey remix) – 5:53

European limited-edition CD single (Remixes)

1. "Wrong" (original) – 3:13
2. "Wrong" (Trentemøller club remix) – 6:55
3. "Wrong" (Thin White Duke remix) – 7:41
4. "Wrong" (Magda's Scallop Funk remix) – 6:21
5. "Wrong" (D.I.M. vs Boys Noize remix) – 5:11

European limited-edition 7-inch single

A. "Wrong" – 3:13
B. "Oh Well" (edit) – 4:25

European 12-inch single

A1. "Wrong"
A2. "Wrong" (Thin White Duke remix)
B1. "Wrong" (Trentemøller club remix)
B2. "Wrong" (Caspa remix)

== Charts ==
=== Weekly charts ===
Weekly chart performance for "Wrong"
Chart (2009)	Peak position
Austria (Ö3 Austria Top 40)	12
Belgium (Ultratop 50 Flanders)	14
Belgium (Ultratop 50 Wallonia)	3
Canada Hot 100 (Billboard)	64
Czech Republic Airplay (ČNS IFPI)	66
Denmark (Tracklisten)	7
Europe (European Hot 100 Singles)	4
Finland (Suomen virallinen lista)	6
France (SNEP)	10
Germany (GfK)	2
Hungary (Rádiós Top 40)	10
Hungary (Single Top 40)	3
Ireland (IRMA)	34
Israel (Media Forest)	5
Italy (FIMI)	8
Japan Hot 100 (Billboard)	89
Netherlands (Single Top 100)	49
Norway (VG-lista)	14
Scotland Singles (OCC)	1
Slovakia Airplay (ČNS IFPI)	29
Spain (Promusicae)	41
Sweden (Sverigetopplistan)	5
Switzerland (Schweizer Hitparade)	16
UK Singles (OCC)	24
US Dance Club Songs (Billboard)	1
US Hot Rock & Alternative Songs (Billboard)	38

=== Year-end charts ===
Year-end chart performance for "Wrong"
Chart (2009)	Position
Belgium (Ultratop 50 Flanders)	82
Belgium (Ultratop 50 Wallonia)	36
Europe (European Hot 100 Singles)	80
Germany (Official German Charts)	45
Hungary (Rádiós Top 40)	99
Italy (FIMI)	38
US Dance Club Songs (Billboard)	31

== Certifications ==
Certifications for "Wrong"
Region	Certification	Certified units/sales
Germany (BVMI)	Gold	150,000^{‡}
^{‡} Sales+streaming figures based on certification alone.
