= Depeche Mode =

English electronic band

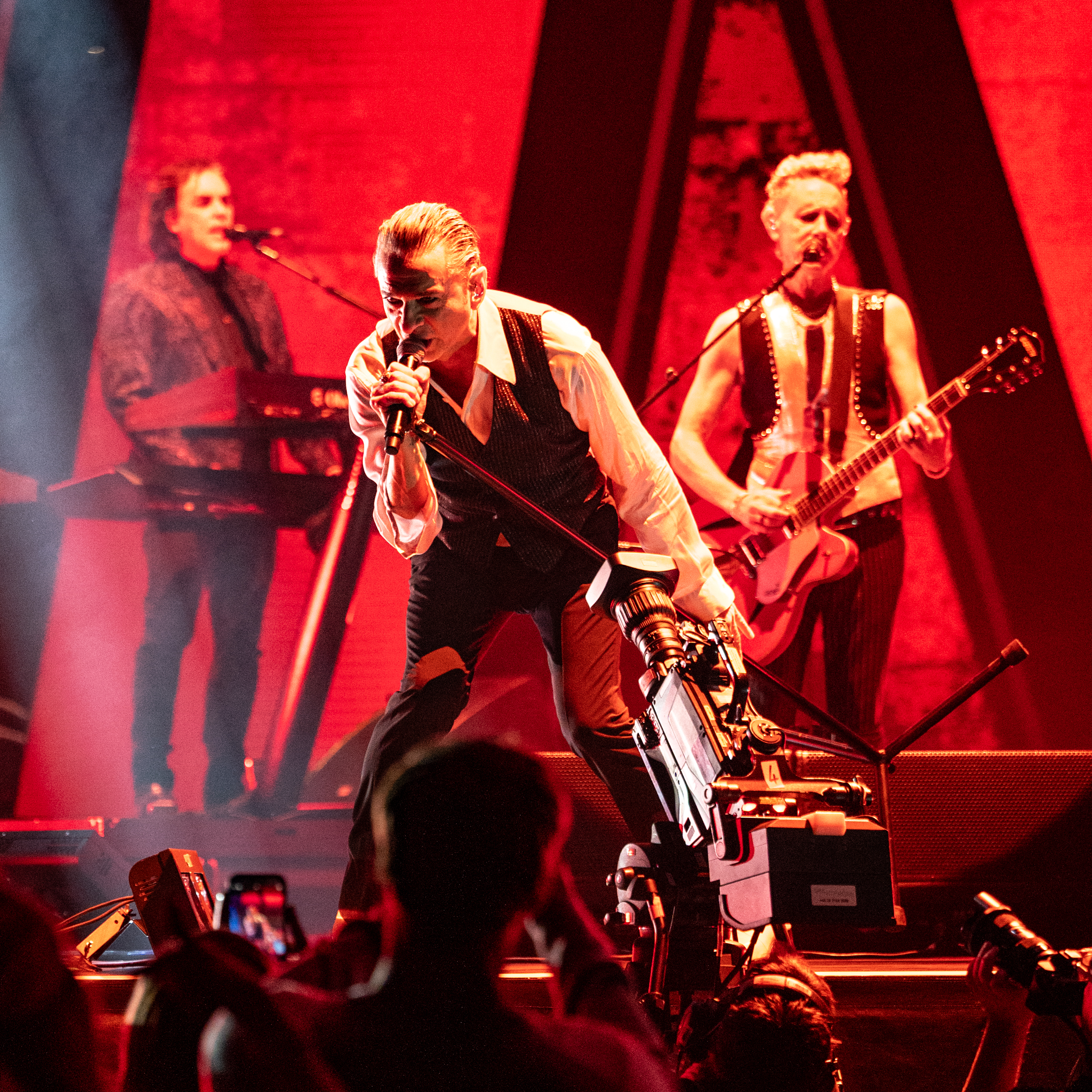
- Depeche Mode performing in Portland, Oregon, November 2023

Background information
- Also known as: Composition of Sound (1980)
- Origin: Basildon, Essex, England
- Genres: Electronic; synth-pop; electronic rock; new wave; industrial; dark wave; alternative rock
- Works: Discography; songs
- Years active: 1980–present
- Labels: Mute; Sire; Reprise; Capitol; Virgin; Columbia
- Members: Dave Gahan; Martin Gore
- Past members: Andy Fletcher; Vince Clarke; Alan Wilder
- Website: depechemode.com

Depeche Mode (/dəˌpɛʃ ˈmoʊd/ də-PESH MOHD) are an English electronic band formed in Basildon, Essex, in 1980. Originally formed with the line-up of Dave Gahan, Martin Gore, Andy Fletcher and Vince Clarke, the band has consisted of Gahan and Gore since Fletcher's death in 2022.

With Clarke as their primary songwriter, Depeche Mode released their debut album Speak & Spell in 1981 amid the British new wave scene and were a part of the MTV-driven Second British Invasion. Clarke left the band at the end of 1981, going on to form the groups Yazoo and later Erasure. The remaining trio recorded their second album, A Broken Frame (1982), with Martin Gore as chief songwriter. The band then recruited Alan Wilder, establishing a line-up that continued until 1995, beginning with the albums Construction Time Again (1983) and Some Great Reward (1984). The albums Black Celebration (1986) and Music for the Masses (1987) cemented them as one of the most popular alternative bands of the 1980s, and their June 1988 concert at the Pasadena Rose Bowl drew a crowd of more than 60,000 people.

In 1990, Depeche Mode released their seventh album, Violator, which reached number 7 on the Billboard 200 and was certified triple Platinum by the RIAA. The following album Songs of Faith and Devotion (1993) was also a success, though the band's internal struggles during recording and touring resulted in Wilder's departure in 1995. The band returned to the line-up of Gahan, Gore, and Fletcher, and released the album Ultra in 1997. The band continued touring and recorded five more albums as a trio—Exciter (2001), Playing the Angel (2005), Sounds of the Universe (2009), Delta Machine (2013) and Spirit (2017)—until Fletcher's death in 2022. Gahan and Gore have since continued as a duo. Their latest album, Memento Mori, was released in 2023.

Depeche Mode have had 54 songs in the UK singles chart, 17 Top 10 albums in the UK chart, and have sold more than 100 million records worldwide. Q included the band in its list of the "50 Bands That Changed the World!" Depeche Mode also rank No. 98 on VH1's "100 Greatest Artists of All Time". In 2016, Billboard named Depeche Mode the 10th Greatest of All Time Top Dance Club Artists. They were inducted into the Rock and Roll Hall of Fame in 2020. In 2023, they were listed in the Guinness Book of World Records as the world's most remixed music act.

== History ==
=== Formation (1977–1980) ===
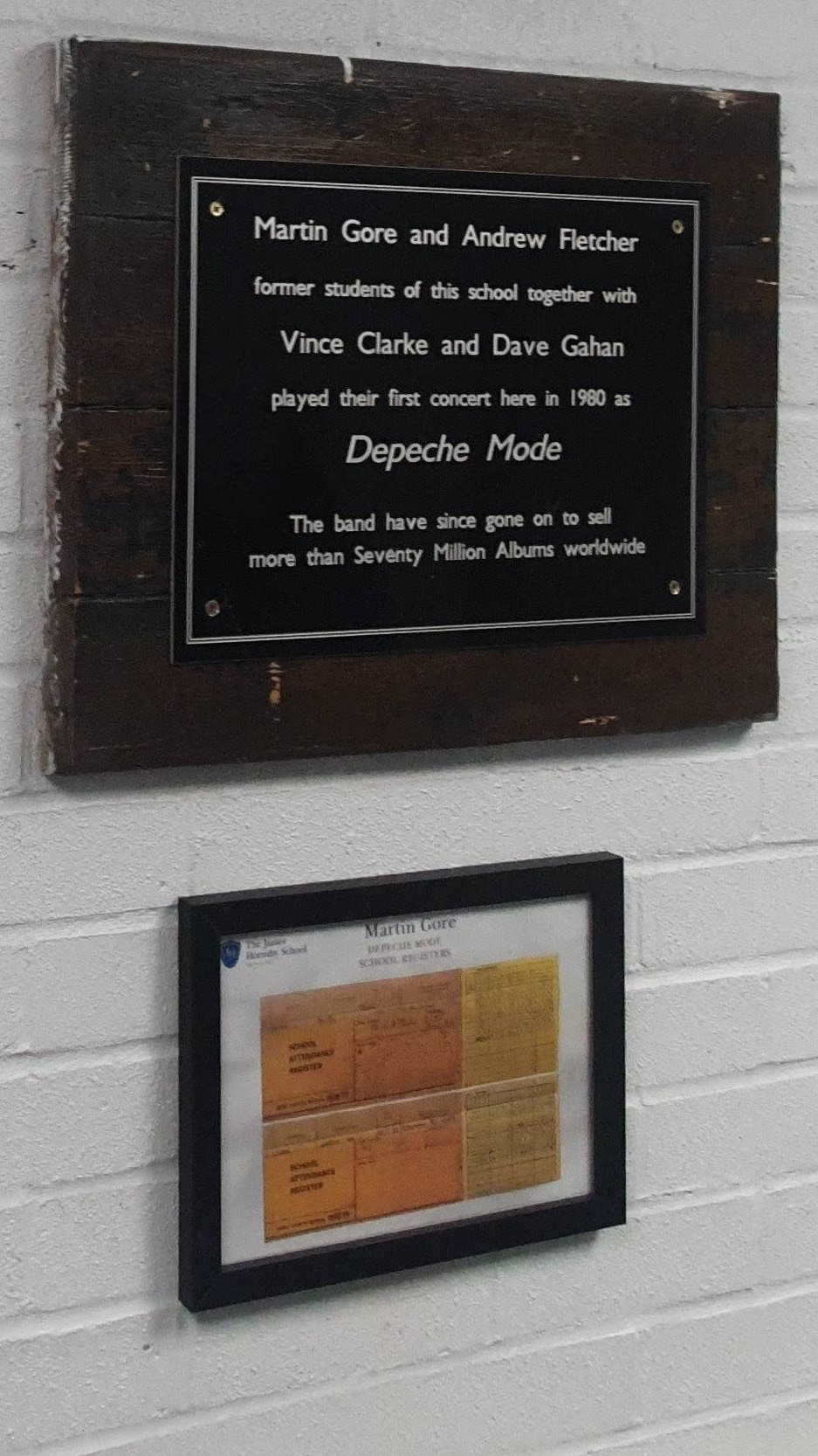
Depeche Mode plaque at the James Hornsby School in Basildon. Martin Gore's school attendance register underneath.

Depeche Mode's origins date to 1977, when schoolmates Vince Clarke and Andy Fletcher formed a band called No Romance in China with Clarke on vocals and guitar and Fletcher on bass. Fletcher would later recall, "Why am I in the band? It was accidental right from the beginning. I was actually forced to be in the band. I played the guitar and I had a bass; it was a question of them roping me in." In 1979, Clarke played guitar in an Ultravox-influenced band, the Plan, with friends Robert Marlow and Paul Langwith. In 1978–1979, Martin Gore played guitar in an acoustic duo, Norman and the Worms, with school friend Phil Burdett on vocals. In 1980, Clarke and Fletcher formed a band called Composition of Sound, with Clarke on vocals/guitar and Fletcher on bass; the pair were soon joined by Gore as a third instrumentalist. Dave Gahan joined the ensemble later in 1980 after Clarke heard him perform at a local Scout hut jam session, singing a rendition of David Bowie's "'Heroes'".

With the advent of affordable synthesisers and the increasing popularity of electronic music, the group began pursuing a synth-pop direction. The first live concert of Composition of Sound as a four-piece was on 14 June 1980 at Saint Nicholas School, Basildon, Essex, England. There is a plaque commemorating the gig at the James Hornsby School in Basildon, where Gore and Fletcher were pupils. Gahan's and Gore's favourite artists included Siouxsie and the Banshees, Sparks, Cabaret Voltaire, Talking Heads and Iggy Pop. Gahan's onstage persona was influenced by Dave Vanian, frontman of the Damned. Gahan has also later credited David Bowie, James Brown, Elvis Presley and Prince as influences on his performance style.

Composition of Sound would become embarrassed about their band name and started thinking of changing it. There were several potential variants, including the name Musical Moments that was suggested by Vince Clarke as both a band name and the name of their first album. Starting at their concert on 24 September 1980 at Bridge House, the band changed their name to Depeche Mode, chosen by Dave Gahan. When explaining the choice for the new name, which was taken from a mistranslation of the name of French fashion magazine Dépêche Mode, Gore said, "It means 'hurried fashion' or 'fashion dispatch'. I like the sound of that." The more accurate translation of the magazine's name (and therefore the band's name) is "Fashion News" or "Fashion Update". (Note: Dépêche meaning "dispatch" or "news report" from Old French despesche/despeche, and mode meaning "fashion".)

=== Speak & Spell and Clarke's departure (1980–1981) ===
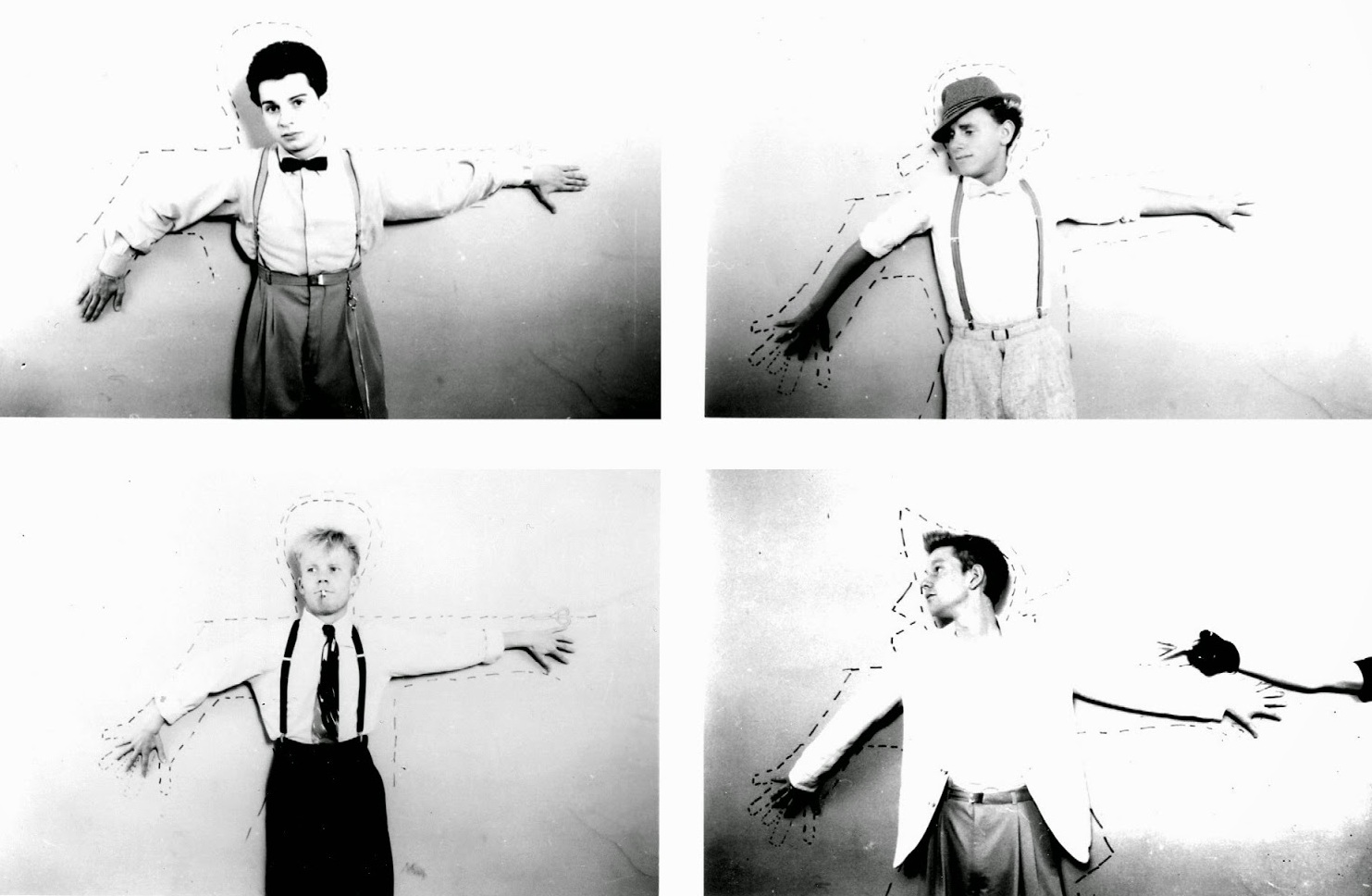
Depeche Mode in 1981

The band made their recording debut in late 1980 for the Some Bizzare Album (released in 1981) with the song "Photographic", later re-recorded for their debut album Speak & Spell.

The band made a demo tape but, instead of mailing the tape to record labels, they would go in and personally deliver it. They would demand the labels play it; according to Dave Gahan, "most of them would tell us to fuck off. They'd say 'leave the tape with us' and we'd say 'it's our only one'. Then we'd say goodbye and go somewhere else."

According to Gahan, prior to securing their record contract, they were receiving offers from all the major labels. Phonogram offered them "money you could never have imagined and all sorts of crazy things like clothes allowances".

While playing a live gig at the Bridge House in Canning Town, the band was approached by Daniel Miller, an electronic producer and founder of Mute Records, who was interested in their recording a single for his burgeoning label. The result of this verbal contract was their first single, "Dreaming of Me", recorded in December 1980 and released in February 1981. It reached number 57 in the UK charts. Encouraged by this, the band recorded their second single, "New Life", which climbed to number 11 in the UK charts and got them an appearance on Top of the Pops. The band went to London by train, carrying their synthesisers all the way to the BBC studios.

The band's next single was "Just Can't Get Enough". The synth-pop single became the band's first UK top ten hit. The video is the only one to feature Vince Clarke. Depeche Mode's debut album, Speak & Spell, was released in October 1981 and peaked at number 10 on the UK album charts. Critical reviews were mixed; Melody Maker described it as a "great album … one they had to make to conquer fresh audiences and please the fans who just can't get enough", while Rolling Stone was more critical, calling the album "PG-rated fluff".

Clarke began to voice his discomfort at the direction the band was taking, saying "there was never enough time to do anything. Not with all the interviews and photo sessions". Clarke also said he was sick of touring, which Gahan said years later was "bullshit to be quite honest". Gahan went on to say he "suddenly lost interest in it and he started getting letters from fans asking what kind of socks he wore." In November 1981, Clarke publicly announced that he was leaving Depeche Mode.

Soon afterwards, Clarke joined up with blues singer Alison Moyet to form Yazoo (or Yaz in the United States). Initial talk of Clarke's continuing to write material for Depeche Mode ultimately amounted to nothing. According to third-party sources, Clarke offered the remaining members of Depeche Mode the track "Only You", but they declined. Clarke denied in an interview that such an offer ever took place, saying "I don't know where that came from. That's not true." The song went on to become a UK top three hit for Yazoo. Gore, who had written "Tora! Tora! Tora!" and the instrumental "Big Muff" for Speak & Spell, became the band's main composer and lyricist.

=== A Broken Frame and Wilder joining (1981–1982) ===
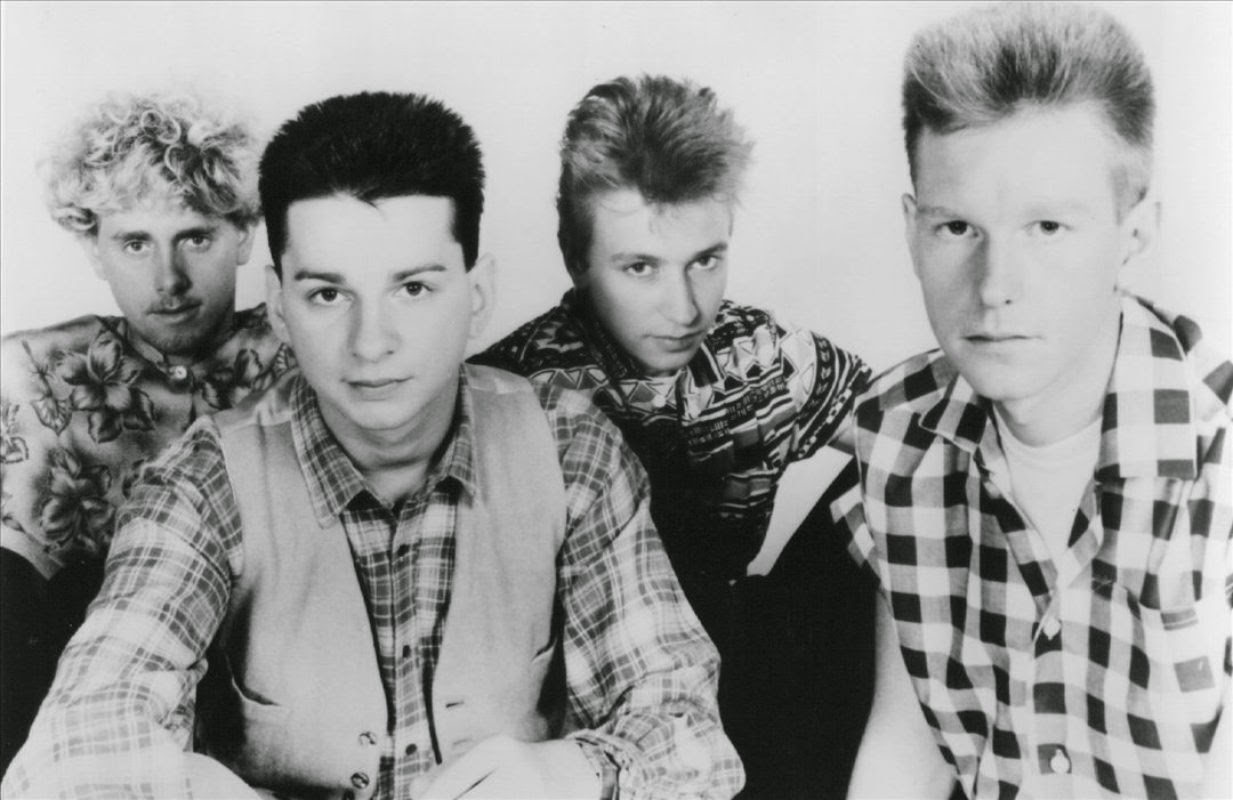
Depeche Mode in 1982

In late 1981, the band placed an anonymous ad in Melody Maker looking for another musician: "Name band, synthesise, must be under twenty-one." Alan Wilder, a classically trained keyboardist from West London, responded and, after two auditions and despite being 22 years old, was hired in early 1982, initially on a trial basis as a touring member. Wilder would later be called the "Musical Director" of the band, responsible for the band's sound until his departure in 1995. As producer Flood would say, "[Alan] is sort of the craftsman, Martin's the idea man and [Dave] is the attitude."

In January 1982, the band released "See You", their first single without Clarke, which managed to beat all three Clarke-penned singles in the UK charts, reaching number 6. The following tour saw the band playing their first shows in North America. Two more singles, "The Meaning of Love" and "Leave in Silence", were released ahead of the band's second studio album. Daniel Miller informed Wilder that he wasn't needed for the recording of the album, as the core trio wanted to prove they could succeed without Vince Clarke. A Broken Frame was released that September, and the following month the band began their 1982 tour.

=== Construction Time Again (1983) ===
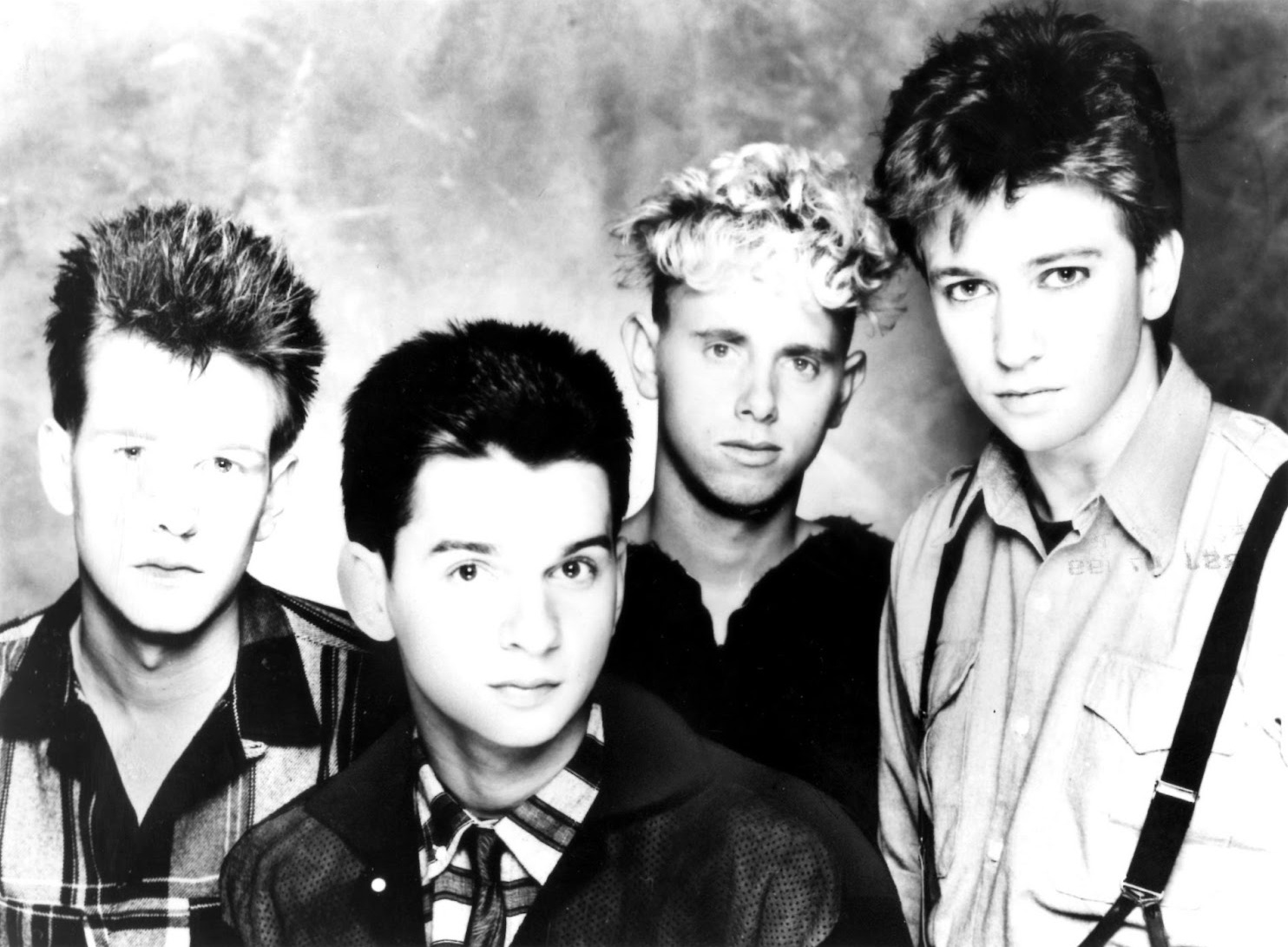
Depeche Mode in 1983

A non-album single, "Get the Balance Right!", was released in January 1983, the first Depeche Mode track to be recorded with Wilder, now an official member of the band. For their third album, Construction Time Again, Depeche Mode worked with producer Gareth Jones, at John Foxx's Garden Studios and at Hansa Studios in West Berlin (where much of David Bowie's seminal Berlin Trilogy featuring Brian Eno had been produced). The album saw a dramatic shift in the group's sound, due in part to Wilder's introduction of the Synclavier and E-mu Emulator samplers. By sampling the noises of everyday objects, the band created an eclectic, industrial-influenced sound, with similarities to groups such as the Art of Noise and Einstürzende Neubauten (the latter becoming Mute labelmates in 1983).

"Everything Counts" rose to number 6 in the UK, also reaching the top 30 in Ireland, South Africa, Switzerland, Sweden and West Germany. Wilder contributed two songs to the album, "The Landscape Is Changing" and "Two Minute Warning". In September 1983, to promote Construction Time Again, the band launched a European concert tour.

=== Some Great Reward (1984) ===
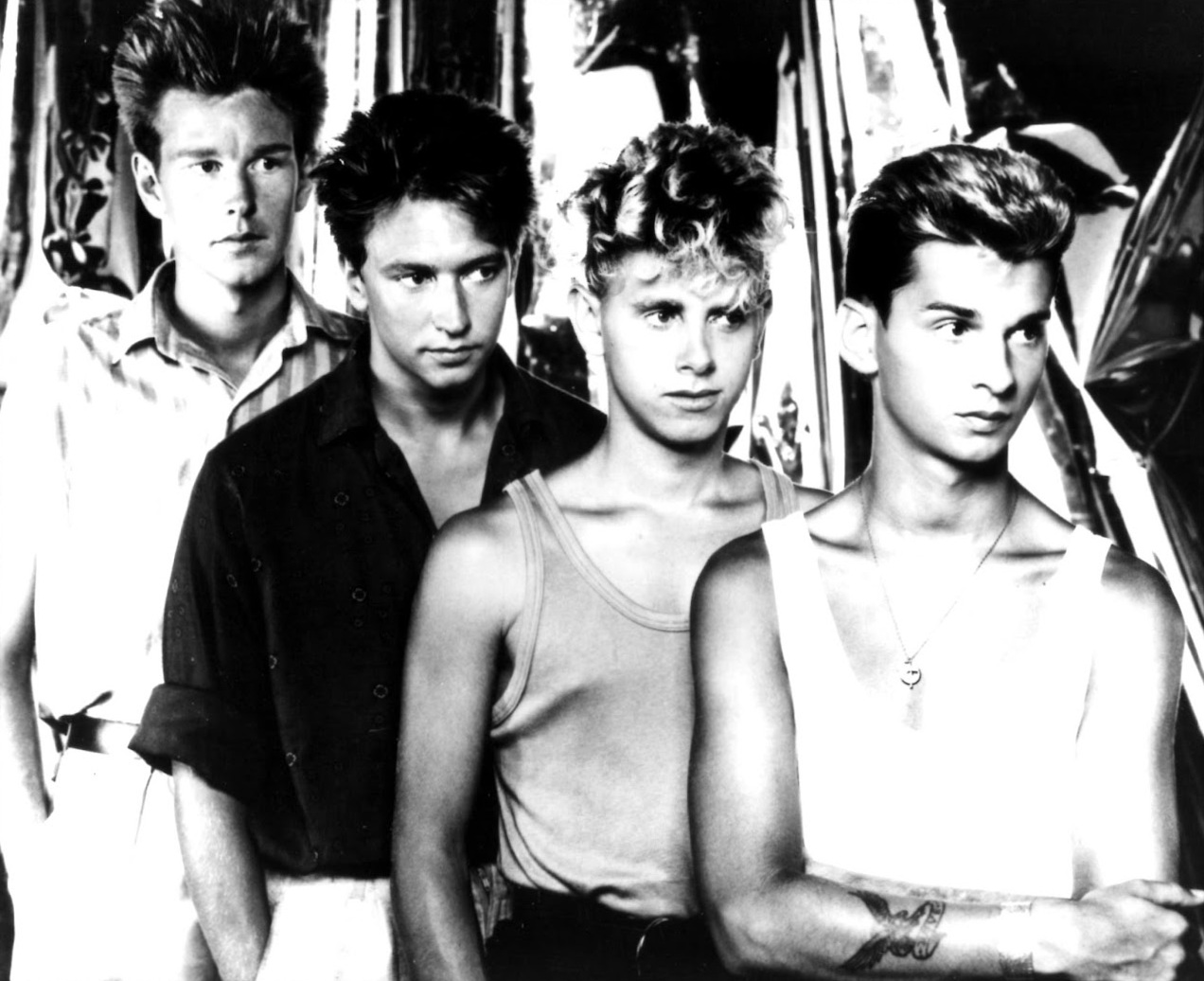
Depeche Mode in 1984

In their early years, Depeche Mode had really attained success only in Europe and Australia. This changed in March 1984, when they released the single "People Are People". The song became a hit, reaching No. 2 in Ireland and Poland, No. 4 in the UK and Switzerland, and No. 1 in West Germany – the first time a DM single topped a country's singles chart – where it was used as the theme to West German TV's coverage of the 1984 Olympics. Beyond this European success, the song also reached No. 13 on the US charts in mid-1985, the first appearance of a DM single on the Billboard Hot 100, and was a Top 20 hit in Canada. "People Are People" became an anthem for the LGBT community, regularly played at gay establishments and gay pride festivals in the late 1980s. Sire, the band's North American record label, released a compilation of the same name which included tracks from A Broken Frame and Construction Time Again as well as several B-sides.

On the American tour, the band was, according to Gore, "shocked by the way the fans were turning up in droves at the concerts". He said that although the concerts were selling well, Depeche Mode struggled to sell records.

In September 1984, Some Great Reward was released. Melody Maker claimed that the album made one "sit up and take notice of what is happening here, right under your nose." In contrast to the political and environmental subjects addressed on the previous album, the songs on Some Great Reward were mostly concerned with more personal themes such as sexual politics ("Master and Servant"), adulterous relationships ("Lie to Me"), and arbitrary divine justice ("Blasphemous Rumours"). Also included was the first Martin Gore ballad, "Somebody"—such songs would become a feature of all following albums. "Somebody" was released as a double A-side with "Blasphemous Rumours", and was the first single with Gore on lead vocal. Some Great Reward became the first Depeche Mode album to enter the US album charts, and made the Top 10 in several European countries.

The World We Live In and Live in Hamburg was the band's first video release, almost an entire concert from their 1984 Some Great Reward Tour.

=== Black Celebration (1985–1986) ===
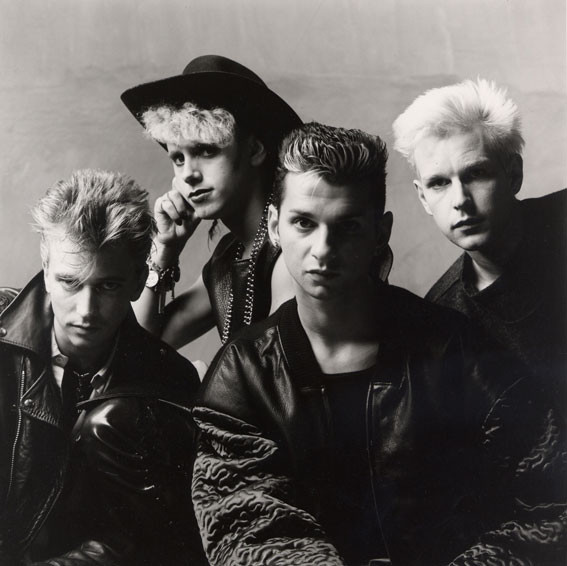
Depeche Mode in 1985

In July 1985, the band played their first-ever concerts behind the Iron Curtain, in Budapest and Warsaw. In October 1985, Mute released a compilation, The Singles 81→85 (Catching Up with Depeche Mode in the US), which included the two new non-album hit singles "Shake the Disease" and "It's Called a Heart", with the US version also including their B-sides ("Fly on the Windscreen", the B-side of "It's Called a Heart", would also be included on the next studio album Black Celebration).

In the United States, the band's music appealed primarily to an alternative audience who were disenchanted with the predominance of "soft rock and 'disco hell'" on the radio. This view of the band was in sharp contrast to how the band was perceived in Europe, despite the increasingly dark and serious tone in their songs. In Germany, France, and other European countries, Depeche Mode were considered teen idols and regularly featured in European teen magazines, becoming one of the most famous synth-pop bands in the mid-'80s. Depeche Mode's musical style shifted slightly again in 1986 with the release of their fifteenth single, "Stripped", and its accompanying album Black Celebration. Retaining their often imaginative sampling and beginning to move away from the "industrial pop" sound that had characterised their previous two LPs, the band introduced an ominous, highly atmospheric and textured sound. Gore's lyrics also took on a darker tone and became more pessimistic.

The music video for "A Question of Time" was the first to be directed by Anton Corbijn, beginning a working relationship that continues to the present. Corbijn has directed 22 of the band's videos. He has also filmed some of their live performances and designed stage sets, as well as most covers for albums and singles starting from Violator.

=== Music for the Masses (1987–1989) ===
For 1987's Music for the Masses, the band's sound and working methods continued to develop. It was the first time they worked with a producer not related to Mute Records. Dave Bascombe was called to assist with the recording sessions; although, according to Alan Wilder, Bascombe's role ended up being more that of engineer. In making the album, the band largely eschewed sampling in favour of synthesiser experimentation. While chart performance of the singles "Strangelove", "Never Let Me Down Again" and "Behind the Wheel" proved to be disappointing in the UK, they performed well in countries such as Canada, Brazil, West Germany, South Africa, Sweden and Switzerland, often reaching the top 10. Record Mirror described Music for the Masses as "the most accomplished and sexy Mode album to date". The album also reached No. 35 on the US Billboard 200 chart.

The Music for the Masses Tour began on 22 October 1987. On 7 March 1988, with no previous announcement that they would be the headlining act, Depeche Mode played in the Werner-Seelenbinder-Halle, East Berlin, becoming one of the few Western groups to perform in East Germany. They also performed concerts in Budapest and Prague in 1988.

The world tour ended on 18 June 1988 with a concert at the Pasadena Rose Bowl. Paid attendance of 60,453 was the highest in eight years for the venue. Its massive success marked a breakthrough for the band in the United States.. The event was documented in 101, a concert film by D. A. Pennebaker and its accompanying soundtrack album. The film is notable for its portrayal of fan interaction. Alan Wilder came up with the title, noting that it was the 101st and final performance of the tour. On 7 September 1988, Depeche Mode performed "Strangelove" at the 1988 MTV Video Music Awards at the Universal Amphitheatre in Los Angeles.

=== Violator (1989–1990) ===
In mid-1989, the band began recording in Milan with producer Flood and engineer François Kevorkian. The initial result of this session was the single "Personal Jesus". Prior to its release, a marketing campaign was launched with advertisements placed in the personals columns of UK regional newspapers with the words "Your own personal Jesus". Later, the ads included a phone number one could dial to hear the song. The resulting furore helped propel the single to number 13 on the UK charts, becoming one of their biggest sellers to date. In the United States, it was their first gold single and their first Top 40 hit since "People Are People", eventually becoming the biggest-selling 12-inch single in Warner Records' history up to that point.

"I think in a way we've been at the forefront of new music; sort of chipping away at the standard rock format stations."

— Martin Gore, stated to NME – July 1990.

Released in February 1990, "Enjoy the Silence" reached number 6 in the UK (the first Top 10 hit in that country since "Master And Servant"). A few months later it reached number 8 in the US and earned the band a second gold record, and it won Best British Single at the 1991 Brit Awards. To promote their new album, Violator, the band held an in-store autograph signing at Wherehouse Entertainment in Los Angeles. The event attracted approximately 20,000 fans and turned into a near riot. Some attendees were injured while being pressed against the store's glass by the crowd. As an apology to those injured, the band released a limited edition cassette tape to fans in Los Angeles, distributed through radio station KROQ (the sponsor of the Wherehouse event).

Violator was the first Depeche Mode album to enter the Top 10 of the Billboard 200, reaching number 7 and staying seventy-four weeks in the chart. It was certified triple platinum in America. Two more singles from the album—"Policy of Truth" and "World in My Eyes"—were hits in the UK, with the former also charting in the US.

"I remember going to see them in Giants Stadium, and they broke the merchandising record; of Bon Jovi, U2—all these bands—Depeche Mode were the biggest!"

— Flood, on the Giants Stadium concert.

The World Violation Tour saw the band play several stadium shows in the US. 42,000 tickets were sold within four hours for a show at Giants Stadium, and 48,000 tickets were sold within half-an-hour of going on sale for a show at Dodger Stadium. An estimated 1.2 million fans saw this tour worldwide.

=== Songs of Faith and Devotion and Wilder's departure (1991–1995) ===
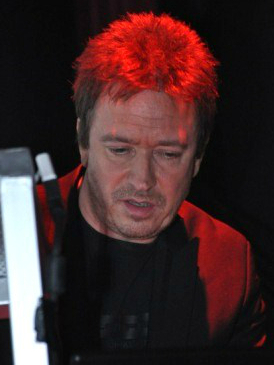
Alan Wilder in 2010

In 1991, the Depeche Mode contribution "Death's Door" was released on the soundtrack album for the film Until the End of the World. Film director Wim Wenders had challenged musical artists to write music the way they imagined they would in the year 2000, the setting of the movie.

The members of Depeche Mode regrouped in Madrid in February 1992. Gahan had become interested in the new grunge scene sweeping the US and was influenced by the likes of Jane's Addiction, Soundgarden, Alice in Chains and Nirvana.

"There's so many sounds that are created from the voice that you wouldn't know were taken from the voice, like rhythm sounds. The number of times I've been sitting in the studio and said, 'I wish I could get a bass that would just go [mimics wet, thick hip-hop bass-drum sound].' Then I think, 'Why can't I just go [repeats noise] into a mic and sample it?' It's obvious; you spend all day trying to get a synthesiser to try and create this sound but you can just go [repeats noise] and you've got it. Then you can send it through some other device after that, and you've got something that sounds absolutely nothing like a voice, but the source was a voice. ... It is a very interesting process."

— Alan Wilder on the genesis of some of the sounds on Songs of Faith and Devotion, stated to Pulse! magazine – May 1993.

In 1993, Songs of Faith and Devotion, again with Flood producing, saw them experimenting with arrangements based as much on heavily distorted electric guitars and live drums (played by Alan Wilder, whose debut as a studio drummer had come on the Violator track "Clean") as on synthesisers. Live strings, uilleann pipes and female gospel vocals were other new additions to the band's sound. The album debuted at number one in both the UK and the US, only the sixth British act to achieve such a distinction to date. The first single from the album was the grunge-influenced "I Feel You". The gospel influences are most noticeable on the album's third single, "Condemnation". Interviews given by the band during this period tended to be conducted separately, unlike earlier albums, where the band was interviewed as a group.

The Devotional Tour followed, documented by a concert film of the same name. The film was directed by Anton Corbijn, and in 1995 earned the band their first Grammy nomination. The band's second live album, Songs of Faith and Devotion Live, was released in December 1993. The tour continued into 1994 with the Exotic leg, which began in February 1994 in South Africa, and ended in April in Mexico. The final leg of the tour, called the and US Summer '94 Tour, consisting of more North American dates, followed shortly thereafter and ran until July. As a whole, the Devotional Tour is to date the longest and most geographically diverse Depeche Mode tour, spanning fourteen months and 159 individual performances.

Q magazine described the 1993 Devotional Tour as "The Most Debauched Rock 'n' Roll Tour Ever". According to The Independent, the "smack-blasted" Gahan "required cortisone shots just to perform, borderline alcoholic Gore suffered two stress-induced seizures, and Andrew Fletcher's deepening depression resulted, in the summer of 1994, in a full nervous breakdown." During the performance in New Orleans, Louisiana, Gahan suffered a heart attack brought on by drug use and had to be ushered out of the Lakefront Arena in an ambulance. In Denver, Colorado, local police arrested Gore and fined him $50 for disturbing the peace when he held a loud party in his hotel room. Fletcher declined to participate in the second half of the Exotic Tour due to mental instability; he was replaced on stage by Daryl Bamonte, who had worked with the band as a personal assistant since the beginning of their career in 1980.

In June 1995, Alan Wilder announced that he was leaving Depeche Mode, explaining:

Since joining in 1982, I have continually striven to give total energy, enthusiasm and commitment to the furthering of the group's success, and in spite of a consistent imbalance in the distribution of the workload, willingly offered this. Unfortunately, within the group, this level of input never received the respect and acknowledgement that it warrants.

— Alan Wilder

Wilder continued to work on his personal project Recoil, releasing a fourth album (Unsound Methods) in 1997.

=== Ultra (1995–1998) ===
Despite Gahan's increasingly severe personal problems, Gore tried repeatedly during 1995 and 1996 to get the band recording again. However, Gahan would rarely turn up to scheduled sessions, and when he did, it would take weeks to get any vocals recorded; one six-week session at Electric Lady in New York produced just one usable vocal (for "Sister of Night"), and even that was pieced together from multiple takes. Gore was forced to contemplate breaking the band up and considered releasing the songs he had written as a solo album. In mid-1996, after his near-fatal overdose in which his heart stopped beating for two minutes, Gahan entered a court-ordered drug rehabilitation program to battle his addiction to cocaine and heroin. With Gahan out of rehab in 1996, Depeche Mode held recording sessions with producer Tim Simenon.

Preceded by two singles, "Barrel of a Gun" and "It's No Good", the album Ultra was released in April 1997. The album debuted at No. 1 in the UK as well as Germany, and No. 5 in the US. The band did not tour in support of the album, with Fletcher quoted as saying: "We're not fit enough. Dave's only eight months into his sobriety, and our bodies are telling us to spend time with our families." As part of the promotion for the release of the album, they did perform two short concerts in London and Los Angeles, promoted as "Ultra Parties". Ultra spawned two further singles, "Home" and "Useless".

A second singles compilation, The Singles 86>98, was released in 1998, preceded by the new single "Only When I Lose Myself". In April 1998, Depeche Mode held a press conference at the Hyatt Hotel in Cologne to announce the Singles Tour. The tour was the first to feature two backing musicians in place of Wilder—Austrian drummer Christian Eigner and British keyboardist Peter Gordeno.

=== Exciter (1999–2004) ===
In 2001, Depeche Mode released Exciter, produced by Mark Bell (of techno group LFO). Bell introduced a minimalist, digital sound to much of the album, influenced by IDM and glitch. "Dream On", "I Feel Loved", "Freelove" and "Goodnight Lovers" were released as singles in 2001 and 2002. Critical response to the album was mixed, with reasonably positive reviews from some magazines (NME, Rolling Stone and LA Weekly), while others (including Q magazine, PopMatters and Pitchfork) derided it as sounding underproduced, dull and lacking in lustre.

In March 2001, Depeche Mode held a press conference at the Valentino Hotel in Hamburg to announce the Exciter Tour. The tour featured 84 performances for more than 1.5 million fans in 24 countries. The concerts held in Paris at the Palais Omnisports de Paris-Bercy were filmed and later released in May 2002 as a live DVD entitled One Night in Paris.

In October 2002 the band won the first-ever Q magazine "Innovation Award".

In 2003, Gahan released his first solo album, Paper Monsters, and toured to promote the record. Also released in 2003 was Gore's second solo album Counterfeit². Fletcher founded his own record label, Toast Hawaii, specialising in promoting electronic music.

A new remix compilation album, Remixes 81–04, was released in 2004, featuring new and unreleased promo mixes of the band's singles from 1981 to 2004. A new version of "Enjoy the Silence", remixed by Mike Shinoda of Linkin Park, "Enjoy the Silence 04", was released as a single and reached No. 7 on the UK charts.

=== Playing the Angel (2005–2007) ===
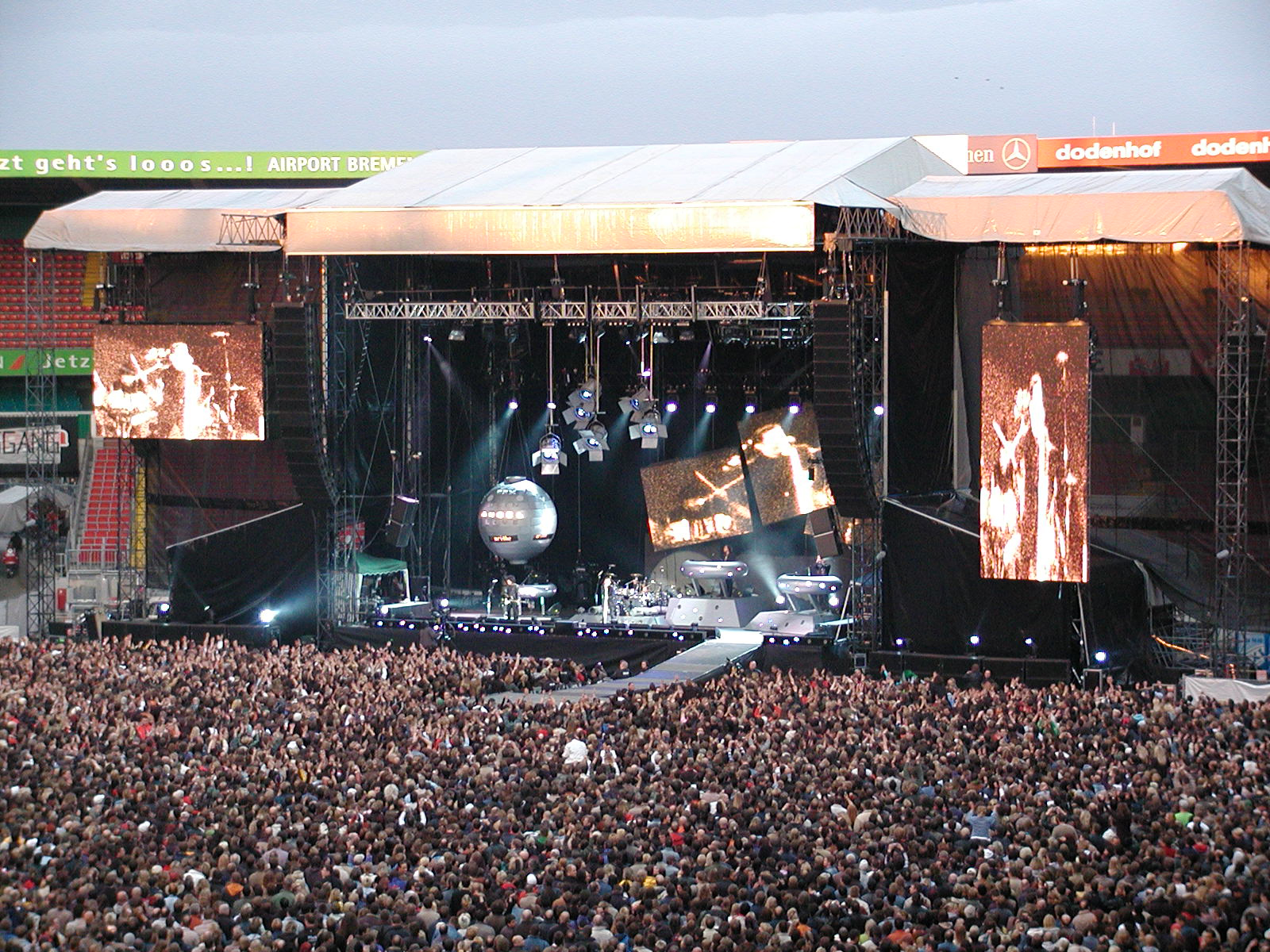
Depeche Mode performing during a Touring the Angel concert in Bremen, June 2006

In October 2005, Depeche Mode released their 11th studio album Playing the Angel. Produced by Ben Hillier, the album peaked at No. 1 in 18 countries and featured the hit single "Precious". This is their first album to feature lyrics written by Gahan and, consequently, the first album since 1984's Some Great Reward featuring songs not written by Gore. "Suffer Well" was the first ever post-Clarke Depeche Mode single not to be written by Gore (lyrics by Gahan, music by Philpott/Eigner). The final single from the album was "John the Revelator", an up-tempo electronic track with a running religious theme, accompanied by "Lilian", a lush track that was a hit in many clubs all over the world.

To promote Playing the Angel, the band launched Touring the Angel, a concert tour of Europe and North America that began in November 2005 and ran for nine months. During the last two legs of the tour Depeche Mode headlined a number of festivals including the Coachella Valley Music and Arts Festival and the O_{2} Wireless Festival. In total, the band played to more than 2.8 million people across 31 countries and the tour was one of the highest grossing and critically acclaimed tours of 2005/2006. Speaking about the tour, Gahan praised it as "probably the most enjoyable, rewarding live shows we've ever done. The new material was just waiting to be played live. It took on a life of its own. With the energy of the crowds, it just came to life." Two shows at Milan's Fila Forum were filmed and edited into a concert film, released on DVD as Touring the Angel: Live in Milan. They also recorded most of the concerts during this tour and released them under the name Touring The Angel.

A "best-of" compilation was released in November 2006, entitled The Best of Depeche Mode Volume 1 featuring a new single "Martyr", an outtake from the Playing the Angel sessions. Later that month Depeche Mode received the MTV Europe Music Award in the Best Group category.

In December 2006, iTunes released The Complete Depeche Mode as its fourth ever digital box-set.

In August 2007, during promotion for Gahan's second solo album, Hourglass, it was announced that Depeche Mode were heading back in studio in early 2008 to work on a new album.

=== Sounds of the Universe (2008–2011) ===
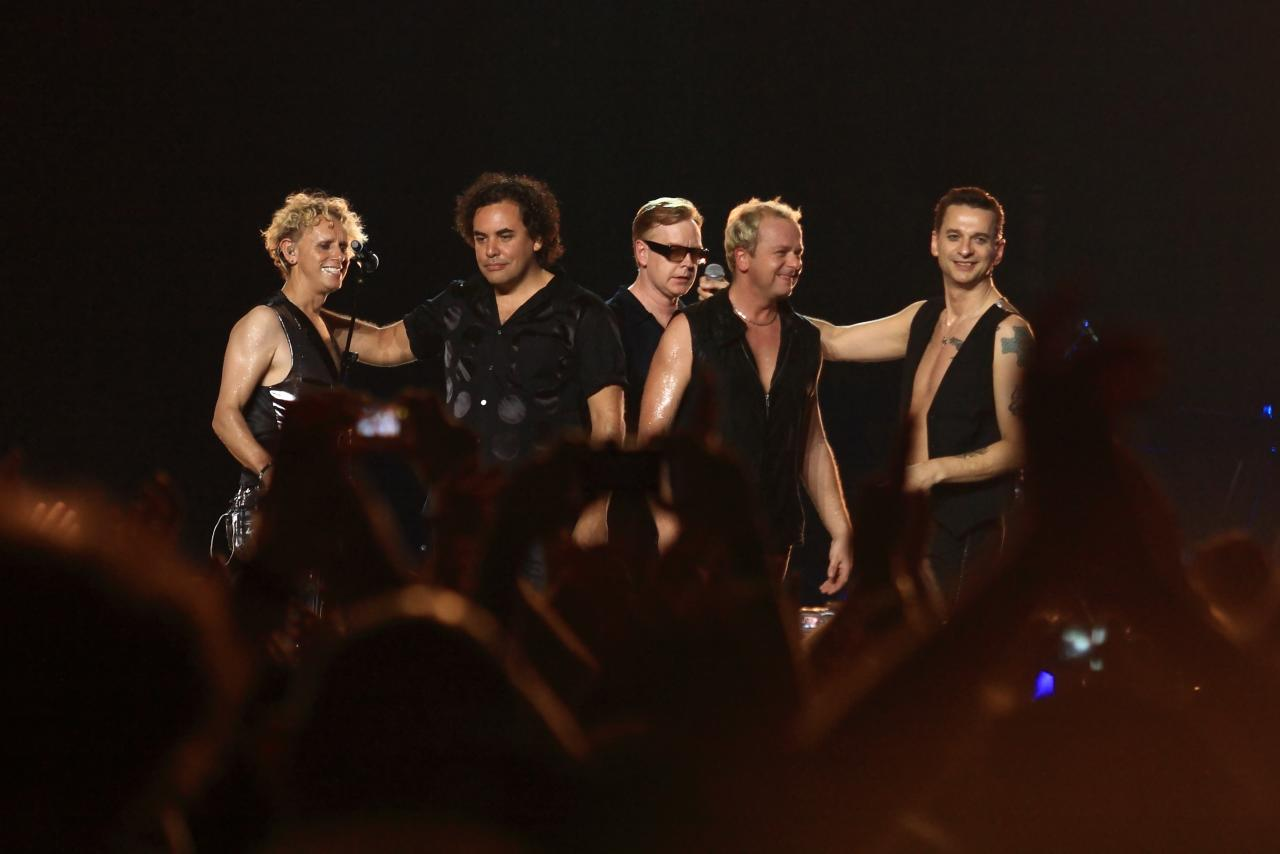
Depeche Mode after a concert in Milan in 2009

In May 2008, Depeche Mode returned to the studio with producer Ben Hillier to work on some songs that Martin Gore had demoed at his home studio in Santa Barbara, California. Later that year it was announced that they were splitting from their long-term US label, Warner Music, and signing with EMI Music worldwide. The album was created in four sessions, two in New York and two in Santa Barbara. A total of 22 songs were recorded, with the standard album being 13 songs in length while many of the others were released in subsequent deluxe editions.

In 2009, Depeche Mode allowed their likeness to be used in Valve's Left 4 Dead 2. The character Rochelle wears a pink T-shirt with an image from the "Touring the Angels" tour on the front.

On 15 January 2009, the official Depeche Mode website announced that the band's twelfth studio album would be called Sounds of the Universe. The album was released on 14 April 2009, also made available through an iTunes Pass, where the buyer received individual tracks in the weeks leading up to the official release date. Fletcher said the idea for their iTunes Pass was a combination of the band's and iTunes': "I think the digital and record companies are starting to get their act together. They were very lazy in the first 10 years when downloads came in. Now they're collaborating more and coming up with interesting ideas for fans to buy products." The album went to number 1 in twenty-one countries. Critical response was generally positive and it was nominated for a Grammy in the Best Alternative Album category. "Wrong" was the first single from the album, released digitally in February 2009. Subsequent singles were "Peace" and the double A-side "Fragile Tension / Hole to Feed". In addition, "Perfect" was released as a promotional-only (non-commercial) single in the United States.

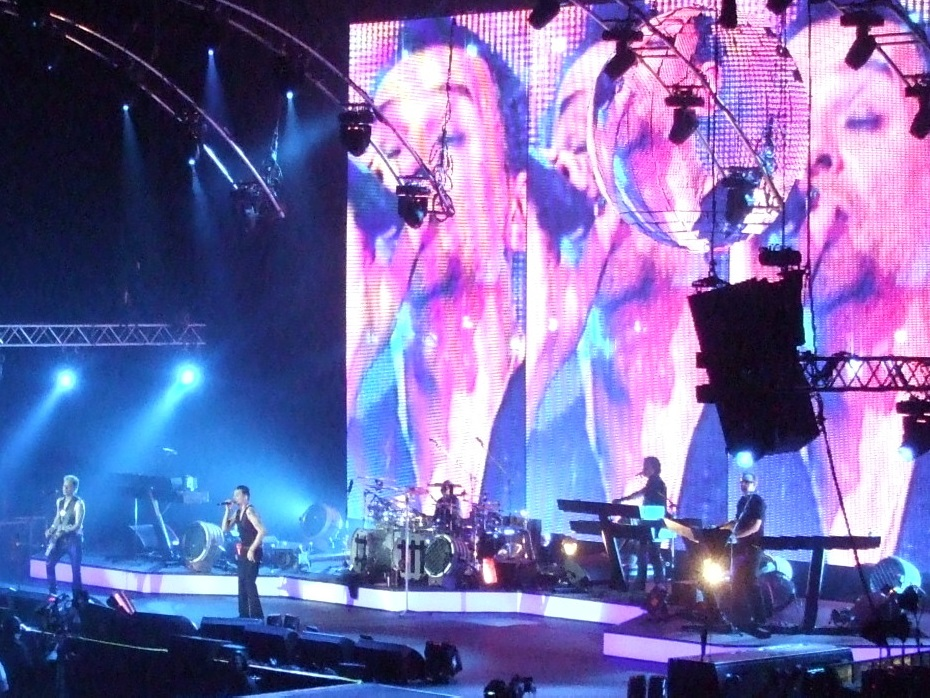
Depeche Mode performing during a Tour of the Universe concert at London's O_{2} Arena, December 2009

On 23 April 2009, Depeche Mode performed for the television program Jimmy Kimmel Live! at the famed corner of Hollywood Boulevard and Vine Street, drawing more than 12,000 fans, which was the largest audience the program had seen since its 2003 premiere, with a performance by Coldplay.

In May 2009, the band embarked on a concert tour in support of the album, called Tour of the Universe; it had been announced at a press conference in October 2008 at the Olympiastadion in Berlin. There was a warm up show in Luxembourg and it officially started on 10 May 2009 in Tel Aviv. The first leg of the tour was disrupted when Dave Gahan was struck down with gastroenteritis. During treatment, doctors found and removed a low-grade tumour from the singer's bladder. Gahan's illness caused 16 concerts to be cancelled, but several of the shows were rescheduled for 2010. The band headlined the Lollapalooza festival during the North American leg of the tour. The tour also took the band back to South America for the first time since 1994's Exotic Tour. During the final European leg, the band played a show at London's Royal Albert Hall in aid of the Teenage Cancer Trust, where former member Alan Wilder joined Martin Gore on stage for a performance of "Somebody". In total the band played to more than 2.7 million people across 32 countries and the tour was one of the most profitable in America in 2009. The concerts held at Palau Sant Jordi, Barcelona, Spain were filmed and later released on DVD and Blu-ray release entitled Tour of the Universe: Barcelona 20/21.11.09. In March 2010, Depeche Mode won the award for "Best International Group – Rock / Pop" at the Echo Awards in Germany.

On 6 June 2011, as the final commitment to their contract with EMI, the band released a remix compilation album, entitled Remixes 2: 81–11 that features remixes by former members Vince Clarke and Alan Wilder. Other remixers involved with the project were Nick Rhodes of Duran Duran, Röyksopp, Karlsson & Winnberg of Miike Snow, Eric Prydz, Clark and more. A new remix of "Personal Jesus" by Stargate, entitled "Personal Jesus 2011", was released as a single on 30 May 2011, in support of the compilation.

Also in 2011, Depeche Mode contributed their cover of the U2 song "So Cruel" to the tribute album AHK-toong BAY-bi Covered, honouring the 20th anniversary of the album Achtung Baby. The compilation CD was released with the December 2011 issue of Q.

=== Delta Machine (2012–2014) ===
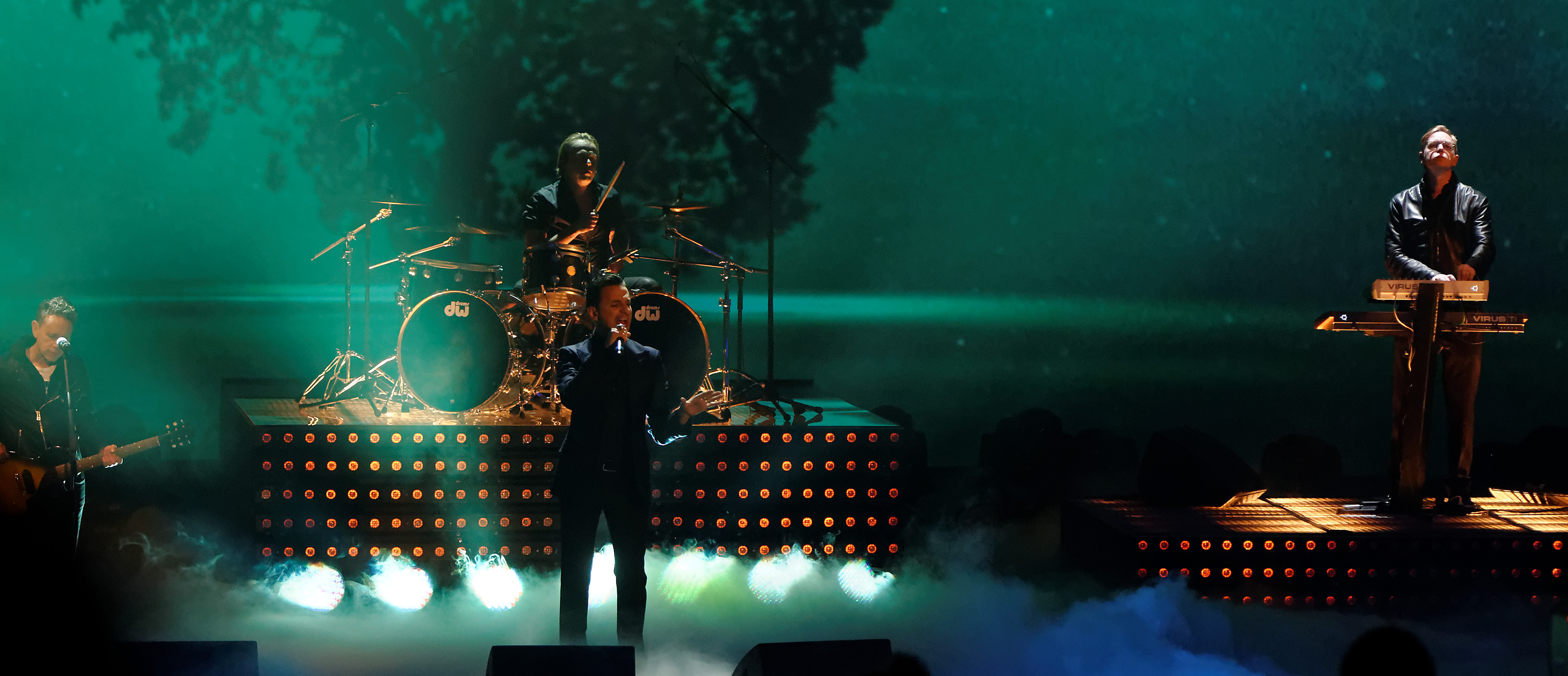
Depeche Mode performing at Wetten, dass..? in 2013

In October 2012 during a press conference in Paris, Dave Gahan, Martin Gore and Andy Fletcher announced plans for a new album and a 2013 worldwide tour starting from Tel Aviv and continuing in Europe and North America. Martin Gore revealed that Flood mixed the album, marking the producer's first studio collaboration with the band since 1993's Songs of Faith and Devotion.

In December 2012, the band officially announced signing a worldwide deal with Columbia Records and releasing a new album in March 2013. On 24 January 2013, it was confirmed that the album was titled Delta Machine. "Heaven", the debut single from Delta Machine was released commercially on Friday 1 February 2013 (although not in the UK). The release date in the UK was pushed back to 18 March 2013 (17 March 2013 on iTunes). The physical release still bore the Mute Records logo, even though the band have now severed ties with their long-standing label. Fletcher mentioned in an interview this was due to their "devotion" to the label and with the band's insistence.Delta Machine spawned two further singles, "Soothe My Soul" on 6 May and "Should Be Higher" on 11 October. Though neither performed well in the UK charts they did perform moderately in other European charts.

In March, the band announced North American dates to their Delta Machine Tour, starting 22 August from Detroit and ending 8 October in Phoenix. In June, other European dates were confirmed for early 2014. The final gig of the tour took place in Moscow, Russia on 7 March 2014, at Olimpiski venue.

That month, Depeche Mode won the award for "Best International Group – Rock / Pop" at the Echo Awards in Germany. Also, they were nominated at the category "Album des Jahres (national oder international)" for Delta Machine but lost against Helene Fischer's Farbenspiel.

On 8 October 2014, the band announced Live in Berlin, the new video and audio release filmed and recorded at the O2 World in Berlin, Germany in November 2013 during the Delta Machine Tour. It was released on 17 November 2014 worldwide.

=== Spirit (2015–2021) ===
In a 2015 Rolling Stone interview celebrating the 25th anniversary of Violator, Gore stated that Johnny Cash's cover of "Personal Jesus" is his favourite cover version of a Depeche Mode song.

On 25 January 2016, Gore announced a projected return to the recording studio in April, with both Gore and Gahan having already written and demoed new songs. In September, the official Depeche Mode Facebook page hinted at a new release, later confirmed by the band to be a music video compilation, Video Singles Collection, scheduled for release in November by Sony. In October 2016, the band announced their fourteenth album titled Spirit. It was produced by James Ford, and was released on 17 March 2017.

"Where's the Revolution", the lead single from Spirit, was released 3 February 2017, along with its lyric video. The official video was published a week later, on 9 February. The Global Spirit Tour officially kicked off on 5 May 2017 with a performance in Stockholm, Sweden, at the Friends Arena. The first leg of the tour covered European countries only, ending with a final stadium show in Cluj-Napoca, Romania, at the Cluj Arena. The second leg of the tour covered North America and returned to Europe. The North America leg of the tour kicked off in Salt Lake City, Utah, on 23 August, at the USANA Amphitheatre. Depeche Mode broke a record when the band became the first to play four nights at the Hollywood Bowl. The band remained in North America until 15 November when they left for Dublin to resume the European leg. The band ended the tour in Europe with two sold-out shows on 23 and 25 July 2018 in Berlin, Germany, at the Waldbühne.

In September 2019, the band announced that Spirits in the Forest, a documentary that was partially filmed during these shows by long-time collaborator Anton Corbijn, would be released in theatres for one night only, 21 November 2019. It was released on CD, DVD and Blu-ray under the title LiVE SPiRiTS on 26 June 2020.

On 7 November 2020, the band were inducted into the Rock and Roll Hall of Fame.

=== Fletcher's death and Memento Mori (2022–present) ===
On 26 May 2022, Andy Fletcher died, aged 60, after suffering an aortic dissection while at home. His bandmates Gahan and Gore stated, "we are shocked and filled with overwhelming sadness with the untimely passing of our dear friend, family member and bandmate Andy 'Fletch' Fletcher." Former Depeche Mode member Alan Wilder stated that learning of Fletcher's death was "a real bolt from the blue."

Prior to Fletcher's death, Gahan said: "There's a ton of stuff that we've done with Depeche Mode that I'm really proud of. I think that's come with time and age. Martin put out a record last year which I really liked. I actually bought a copy because it wouldn't feel right otherwise. I know he's been pottering away in his studio as well, so I guess at some point next year we'll get together. Hopefully at least to just have a chat about what we both feel like we could move forward with."

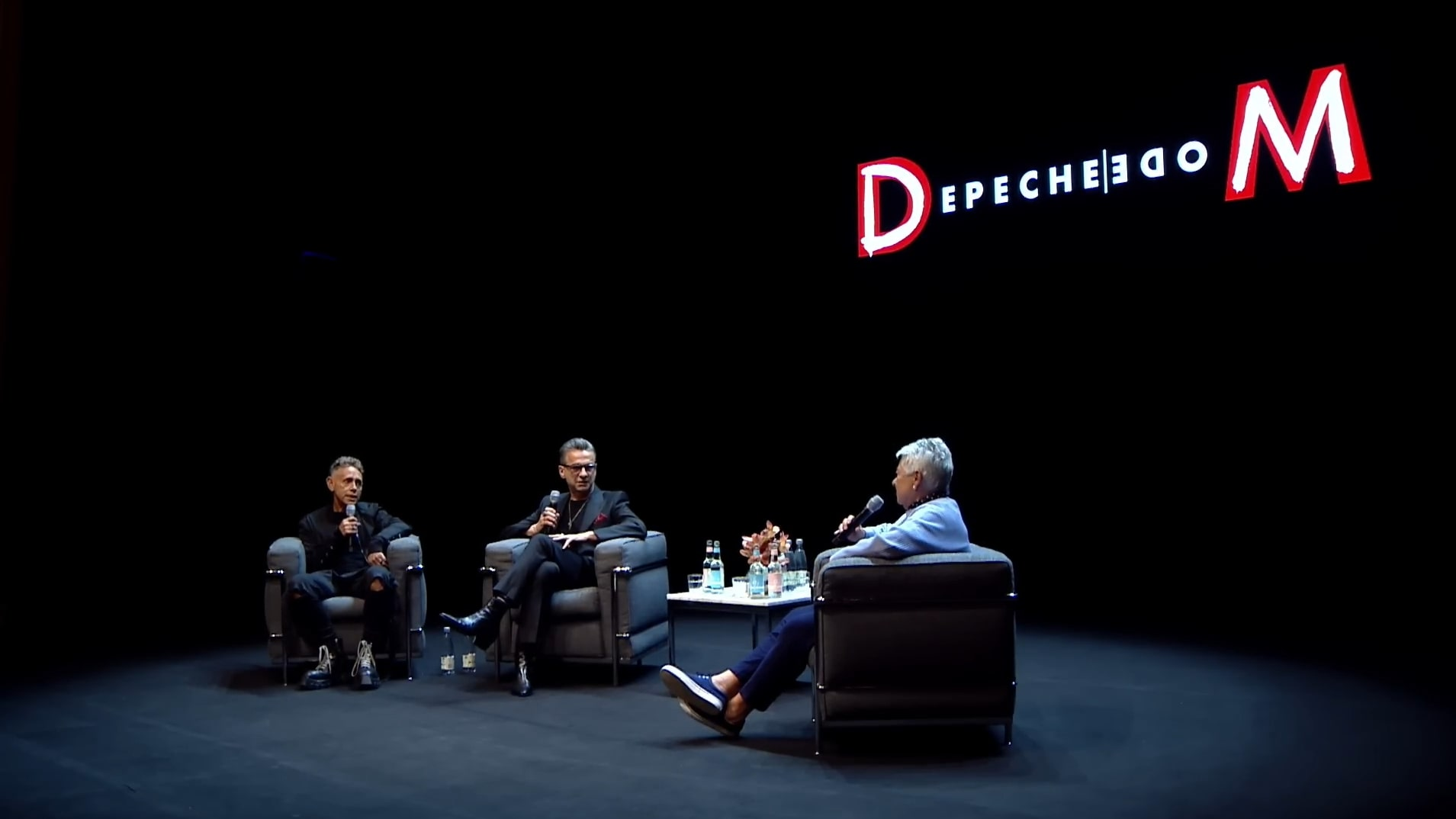
Gore (left) and Gahan (centre) announcing their upcoming album, at a press conference in Berlin, in 2022

On 15 August 2022, the social media accounts for Depeche Mode posted a photo of Gahan and Gore in a recording studio, with them tweeting, "finding stability in what we know and love, and focusing on what gives life meaning and purpose", which magazines like NME suggested was a hint at work on a new studio album.

On 4 October 2022, Depeche Mode announced their fifteenth studio album Memento Mori and a tour to support the album which started on 23 March 2023; the 23 March 2023 concert, which was held in the Golden 1 Center in Sacramento, California, would also mark Depeche Mode first performance in the United States in five years. The tour, which consisted of 112 shows, concluded on April 8, 2024.

The first single, "Ghosts Again", released on 9 February 2023, was co-written by Richard Butler of the Psychedelic Furs. It received relative success in the UK, charting at No. 14. "Ghosts Again" had widespread success in the US, charting in the top 10 of 3 Billboard charts. Reaching number 2 on the Adult Alternative Songs chart, Gahan said it "captures this perfect balance of melancholy and joy", while Gore said it has "such an upbeat feel to it" and how rare it is for the band to record a song that "I just don't get sick of listening to."

The band stated that work on the album began during the COVID-19 pandemic in 2020. Gahan and Gore said they would send each other ideas for songs, for example Gahan said, "I played guitar and sort of sang on my iPhone", while Gore "sent it back with his angelic voice." They also stated that they would be working with James Ford once again as producer along with Marta Salogni mixing for the album.

Depeche Mode: M, a documentary film chronicling the band's three concerts in Mexico City which were held in September 2023 during the Memento Mori World Tour, was theatrically released on October 28, 2025.

Depeche Mode became part of the War Child charity project Help(2), contributing a cover version of Buffy Sainte-Marie's song "Universal Soldier". The album, produced by James Ford, was released on March 6, 2026.

== Musical style and influences ==
Music video for "It's Called a Heart", showcasing the industrial-influenced musical and visual style that the band developed during the 1980s.

Clarke was inspired to pursue electronic music by the band Orchestral Manoeuvres in the Dark (OMD), whom he cited as crucial to the formation of Depeche Mode. OMD were enlisted as support on the Music for the Masses Tour, with Gore affirming their influence. In a later interview, Gore explained his early objectives for Depeche Mode, saying, "My dream was to combine the emotion of Neil Young or John Lennon transmitted by Kraftwerk's synthesisers. Soul music played by electronic instruments." Fletcher mentioned influences including the late 1970s punk rock scene, the post-punk bands Siouxsie and the Banshees and the Cure, and electronic group the Human League. Band members have also cited David Bowie, the Clash, Roxy Music and Brian Eno, Elvis Presley, the Velvet Underground, Fad Gadget, Suicide, and the blues.

Depeche Mode were considered a teen pop group during their early period in the UK, and interviewed in teen pop magazines such as Smash Hits. Following the departure of Clarke, their music began to take on a darker tone, establishing a darker sound in the band's music, as Gore assumed lead songwriting duties. Gore's lyrics include themes such as sex, religion, and politics. Gore has stated he feels lyrical themes which tackle issues related to solitude and loneliness are a better representation of reality, whereas he finds "happy songs" fake and unrealistic. At the same time, he asserts that the group's music contains "an element of hope".

The band had several rules that they stuck with over the course of many of their albums, including "no presets", "no chords", and "no hi-hats". For example, they had to assemble chords out of separate monophonic parts. Once they started adding samples to their music in 1982, they had rules regarding the use of samples: all samples must be original, and no sample could be used twice. Generally, they stuck to these rules, although almost every rule was broken at least once. Exceptions included their re-use of a tom drum sample on both "Stripped" (1986) and "Never Let Me Down Again" (1987), and the hi-hat sound on the song "Nothing", which was actually an (original) sample of a pneumatic bus door closing. Producer David Bascombe, who worked with the band on Music for the Masses, explained that these rules helped shape the band's unique sound.

Depeche Mode's music has been variously described as synth-pop, alternative dance, alternative rock, dance-rock, dark wave, EDM, electronic rock, industrial, new wave, pop rock and post-punk. The band have also experimented with other genres throughout their career, including avant-garde, electronica, pop, soul, techno, industrial rock, heavy metal and bossa nova.

== Legacy ==
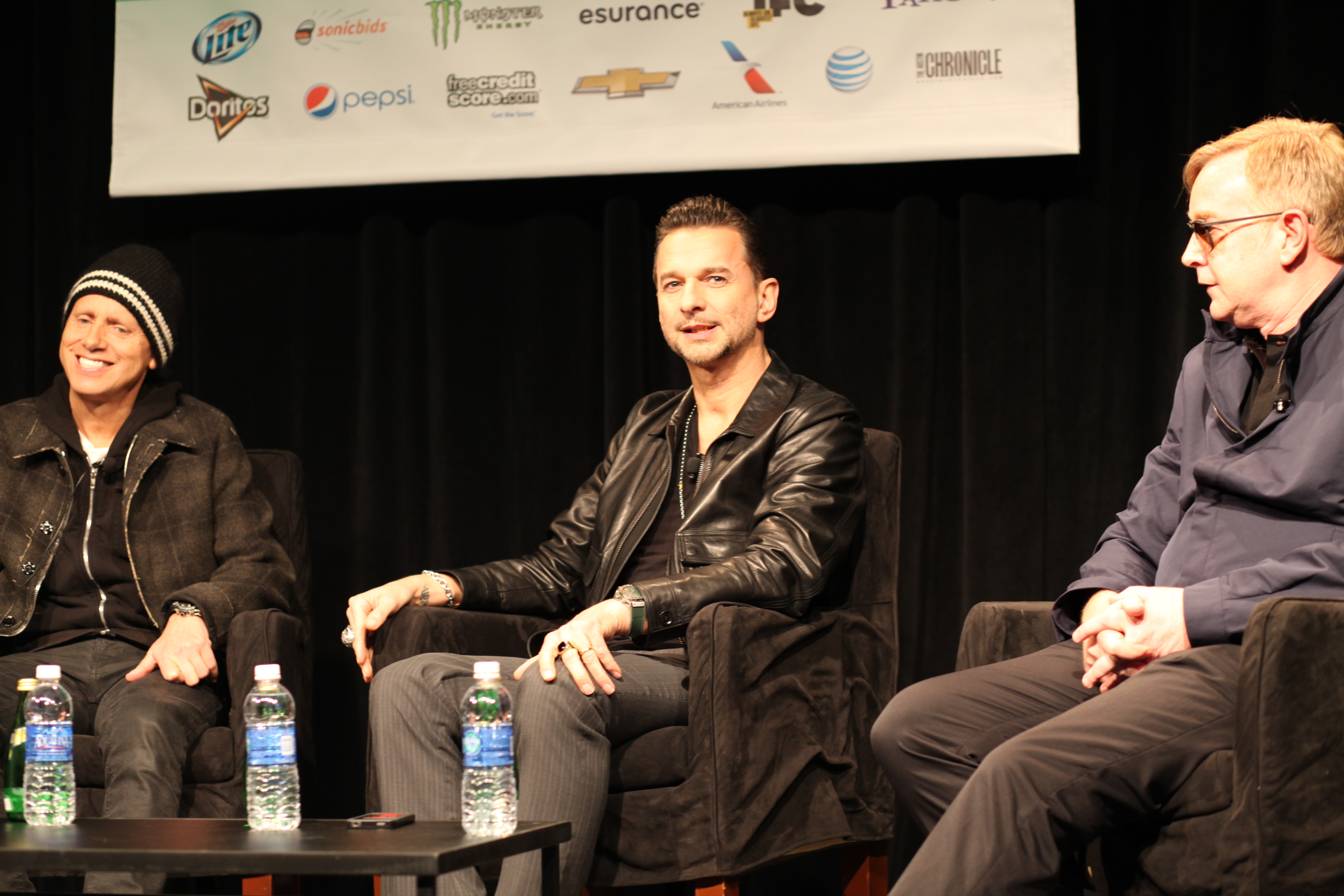
Depeche Mode in 2013

Depeche Mode have released a total of 15 studio albums, 10 compilation albums, six live albums, eight box sets, 13 video albums, 71 music videos, and 54 singles. They have sold more than 100 million records and played live to more than 35 million fans worldwide. The band has had 50 songs in the UK singles chart, and one US and two UK number-one albums. In addition, all of their studio albums have reached the UK Top 10 and their albums have spent more than two hundred weeks on the UK Charts. Along with the Red Hot Chili Peppers, U2, and Nine Inch Nails, Depeche Mode are one of four acts that have charted at least once on the Billboard Alternative Airplay chart in every decade since its debut in 1988.

In 2006, American music critic Sasha Frere-Jones stated that "the last serious English influence was Depeche Mode, who seem more and more significant as time passes." Depeche Mode's releases have been nominated for five Grammy Awards: Devotional for Best Long Form Music Video; "I Feel Loved" and "Suffer Well", both for Best Dance Recording; Sounds of the Universe for Best Alternative Album; and "Wrong" for Best Short Form Music Video. In addition, Depeche Mode have been honoured with a Brit Award for "Enjoy the Silence" in the Best British Single category, the first-ever Q Innovation Award, and an Ivor Novello Award for Martin Gore in the category of International Achievement.

Depeche Mode were called "the most popular electronic band the world has ever known" by Q, "one of the greatest British pop groups of all time" by The Sunday Telegraph, and "the quintessential eighties techno-pop band" by Rolling Stone and AllMusic. They were ranked No. 2 on Electronic Music Realm's list of The 100 Greatest Artists of Electronic Music, and Q included them on their list of "50 bands that changed the world".

Other musicians have stated their admiration for Depeche Mode. In an interview in 2009, Simple Minds lead singer Jim Kerr argued that Depeche Mode and U2 were the only contemporaries of his band which could be said to have "stayed constantly relevant". Muse's Matt Bellamy said, "They had their own thing, their own style, own sound. I respect them very much." During Depeche Mode's induction into the Rock and Roll Hall of Fame, Coldplay's Chris Martin remarked, "sonically, they were and are about throwing away all the rulebooks." Arcade Fire's Win Butler added, "I feel like their music still sounds like it could come out 20 years from now. Depeche were able to take that spirit and spread it, which is really kind of a sacred responsibility."

On December 13, 2023, Los Angeles city council member Monica Rodriguez, officially declared December 13 as "Depeche Mode Day" in the city of Los Angeles. Dave Gahan and Martin Gore were present as they were honored in a public ceremony held at Los Angeles City Hall.

=== Influence ===
Many major artists have cited the band as an influence, including: Arcade Fire, the Killers, Nine Inch Nails, Chvrches, the Smashing Pumpkins, Coldplay, Muse, Metric, No Doubt, A Perfect Circle, Marilyn Manson, Linkin Park, the Crystal Method, Fear Factory, La Roux, Gotye, Rammstein, a-ha, Tegan and Sara, And one and Paul van Dyk. Depeche Mode contemporaries Pet Shop Boys, Tears for Fears and Gary Numan have also cited the band as an influence. Colombian singer Shakira described "Enjoy the Silence" as the song that first sparked her passion for pop music.

The dark themes and moods of Depeche Mode's lyrics and music have been enjoyed by several heavy metal artists, and the band influenced acts such as Marilyn Manson and Deftones. Trent Reznor of Nine Inch Nails also cited Depeche Mode, in particular their 1986 album Black Celebration, as a major influence on his beginnings. They have also been named as an influence on Detroit techno and indie rock.

== Philanthropy ==
Early in their career, Depeche Mode were dismissive of benefit concerts such as Live Aid. Gore stated, "If these bands really care so much, they should just donate the money and let that be it. Why can't they do it without all the surrounding hype?".

Since 2010, the band have applied their celebrity and cultural longevity to help promote and raise funds for several notable charity endeavours. They lent their support to high-profile charities such as MusiCares, Cancer Research UK and the Teenage Cancer Trust. The band has also supported the Small Steps Project, a humanitarian organization based in the UK, aiming to assist economically disadvantaged children into education. They have partnered with Swiss watchmaker Hublot to support Charity: Water, aimed at the provision of clean drinking water in developing countries. Such collaboration led to the release of two different limited edition watches, the Hublot Big Bang Depeche Mode in 2017 and The Singles Limited Edition series based from the Big Bang model in 2018. The proceeds helped raise $1.7 million for Charity: Water. In 2014, the partnership hosted a gala and fundraiser at the TsUM building in Moscow, raising $1.4 million for the charity.

== Band members ==
=== Current members ===
- Dave Gahan – lead and backing vocals (1980–present)
- Martin Gore – guitars, keyboards, backing and lead vocals (1980–present)

==== Touring musicians ====
- Christian Eigner – drums, keyboards (1997–present)
- Peter Gordeno – keyboards, bass guitar, piano, backing vocals (1998–present)

=== Former members ===
- Andy Fletcher – keyboards, bass guitar, occasional backing vocals (1980–2022; his death)
- Vince Clarke – keyboards, backing vocals, guitars (1980–1981); lead vocals (1980)
- Alan Wilder – keyboards, piano, drums, backing vocals (1982–1995; touring musician earlier in 1982; guest in 2010)

==== Former touring musicians ====
- Hildia Campbell – backing vocals (1993–1994)
- Samantha Smith – backing vocals (1993–1994)
- Daryl Bamonte – keyboards, samplers, bass guitar (1994)
- Dave Clayton – keyboards, programming (1996–1997)
- Janet Cooke – backing vocals (1998)
- Jordan Bailey – backing vocals (1998, 2001)
- Georgia Lewis – backing vocals (2001)

== Discography ==
Studio albums

- Speak & Spell (1981)
- A Broken Frame (1982)
- Construction Time Again (1983)
- Some Great Reward (1984)
- Black Celebration (1986)
- Music for the Masses (1987)
- Violator (1990)
- Songs of Faith and Devotion (1993)
- Ultra (1997)
- Exciter (2001)
- Playing the Angel (2005)
- Sounds of the Universe (2009)
- Delta Machine (2013)
- Spirit (2017)
- Memento Mori (2023)

== Tours ==
- 1980 Tour (1980)
- 1981 Tour (1981)
- Speak & Spell Tour (1981)
- See You Tour (1982)
- Broken Frame Tour (1982–1983)
- Construction Time Again Tour (1983–1984)
- Some Great Reward Tour (1984–1985)
- Black Celebration Tour (1986)
- Music for the Masses Tour (1987–1988)
- World Violation Tour (1990)
- Devotional Tour (1993)
- Exotic Tour/Summer Tour '94 (1994)
- The Singles Tour 86>98 (1998)
- Exciter Tour (2001)
- Touring the Angel (2005–2006)
- Tour of the Universe (2009–2010)
- The Delta Machine Tour (2013–2014)
- Global Spirit Tour (2017–2018)
- Memento Mori World Tour (2023–2024)

== See also ==
- List of artists who reached number one on the U.S. Dance Club Songs chart
- List of artists who reached number one on the U.S. alternative rock chart
