= List of songs recorded by Depeche Mode =

Songs by English electronic band

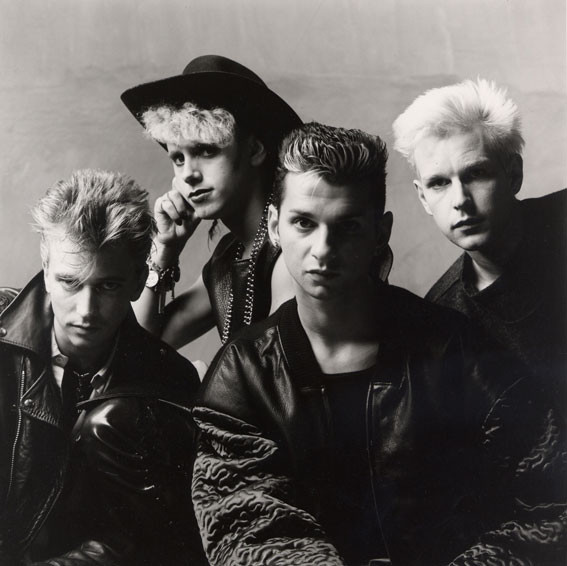
Depeche Mode in 1985. L–R: Alan Wilder, Martin Gore, Dave Gahan and Andy Fletcher

Depeche Mode are an English electronic band who have recorded over 200 songs across four decades. Originally formed in 1980, the band consisted of Vince Clarke, Martin Gore, Andy Fletcher and Dave Gahan. With Clarke as their primary songwriter, the band released their debut single, "Dreaming of Me", and their first album, Speak & Spell, a synth-pop record featuring the UK top ten hit "Just Can't Get Enough". Clarke departed the band shortly after its release, after which Gore became the band's primary songwriter and the band hired Alan Wilder to replace Clarke. Their second album, A Broken Frame, was released in 1982. The band began incorporating new sounds into their music on 1983's Construction Time Again, including Synclavier and an emulator, and by 1984's Some Great Reward, the group incorporated industrial sounds on the chart hit "People Are People", while Gore explored darker lyrics. The following album, Black Celebration (1986), marked the end of the band's association with producers Daniel Miller and Gareth Jones.

Music for the Masses (1987), co-produced by the band and David Bascombe, propelled Depeche Mode to mainstream success in the United States, with three hit singles: "Strangelove", "Never Let Me Down Again" and "Behind the Wheel". The album marked a turning point in the band's sound, blending darkly sexual themes with expansive production. For 1990's Violator, the band worked with the producer Flood. With major hits "Personal Jesus", "Enjoy the Silence", "Policy of Truth" and "World in My Eyes", the album propelled the band to global superstardom. 1993's Songs of Faith and Devotion, also co-produced by Flood, featured religious themes and music inspired by the alternative rock and grunge scenes, spawning the hits "I Feel You" and "Walking in My Shoes". Wilder departed the band in 1995. Continuing as a trio on 1997's Ultra, the band worked with producer Tim Simenon and moved into a more danceable, electronic direction, away from the harder, rock-oriented sound of Songs of Faith and Devotion, producing the hits "Barrel of a Gun" and "It's No Good".

Exciter (2001), produced by Mark Bell, found the band moving into a more experimental and minimalist electronic sound, evident on the singles "Dream On" and "I Feel Loved". Playing the Angel (2005) was the first Depeche Mode album to feature writing contributions from Gahan. Produced by Ben Hillier, Rolling Stone described the album's sound as featuring "the band's classic blend of synth-pop beats, heavy guitar riffs and dark lyrics". Its singles included "Precious" and "John the Revelator". Hillier continued working with the band, producing their next two albums Sounds of the Universe (2009) and Delta Machine (2013). On 2017's Spirit, produced by James Ford, the band expressed their frustrations with the political climates of the United States and United Kingdom. After Fletcher died in 2022, Gore and Gahan recorded 2023's Memento Mori as a duo. Again produced by Ford, Memento Mori features themes of melancholy and mortality on songs such as "Ghosts Again".

== Songs ==
Key
†	Indicates songs written by others

Name of song, writer(s), original release, producer(s), and year of release
Song	Writer(s)	Original release(s)	Producer(s)	Year	Ref(s)
"4′33″"	John Cage †	STUMM433	Daniel Miller	2019	
"Agent Orange"	Martin Gore	B-side of "Strangelove"	Depeche Mode; David Bascombe	1987	
"All That's Mine"	Dave Gahan; Kurt Uenala	B-side of "Heaven"	Ben Hillier	2013	
"Alone"	Martin Gore	Delta Machine	Ben Hillier	2013	
"Always"	Martin Gore	Delta Machine (Deluxe Edition)	Ben Hillier	2013	
"Always You"	Martin Gore	Memento Mori	James Ford	2023	
"And Then..."	Martin Gore	Construction Time Again	Daniel Miller; Depeche Mode	1983	
"Angel"	Martin Gore	Delta Machine	Ben Hillier	2013	
"Any Second Now (Voices)" (Note: An instrumental version simply titled "Any Second Now" was released as a B-side to "Just Can't Get Enough")	Vince Clarke	Speak & Spell	Daniel Miller; Depeche Mode	1981	
"Are People People?" (Note: A significant reworking of "People Are People", remixed by Adrian Sherwood.)	Martin Gore	B-side to "Master and Servant"	Daniel Miller; Depeche Mode; Gareth Jones	1984	
"Barrel of a Gun"	Martin Gore	Ultra	Tim Simenon	1997	
"Before We Drown"	Dave Gahan; Peter Gordeno; Christian Eigner	Memento Mori	James Ford	2023	
"Behind the Wheel"	Martin Gore	Music for the Masses	Depeche Mode; David Bascombe	1987	
"Better Days"	Martin Gore	B-side of "Suffer Well" (UK CD)	Ben Hillier	2006	
"Big Muff"	Martin Gore	Speak & Spell	Daniel Miller; Depeche Mode	1981	
"Black Celebration"	Martin Gore	Black Celebration	Daniel Miller; Depeche Mode; Gareth Jones	1986	
"Black Day"	Martin Gore; Alan Wilder; Daniel Miller	B-side of "Stripped" (12" UK)	Daniel Miller; Depeche Mode; Gareth Jones	1986	
"Blasphemous Rumours"	Martin Gore	Some Great Reward	Daniel Miller; Depeche Mode; Gareth Jones	1984	
"Blue Dress"	Martin Gore	Violator	Depeche Mode; Flood	1990	
"The Bottom Line"	Martin Gore	Ultra	Tim Simenon	1997	
"Boys Say Go!"	Vince Clarke	Speak & Spell	Daniel Miller; Depeche Mode	1981	
"Breathe"	Martin Gore	Exciter	Mark Bell	2001	
"Breathing in Fumes"	Martin Gore	B-side of "Stripped" (12" UK)	Daniel Miller; Depeche Mode; Gareth Jones	1986	
"Broken"	Dave Gahan; Kurt Uenala	Delta Machine	Ben Hillier	2013	
"But Not Tonight"	Martin Gore	B-side of "Stripped" (UK); Black Celebration (US edition)	Daniel Miller; Depeche Mode; Gareth Jones	1986	
"Caroline's Monkey"	Martin Gore; Richard Butler	Memento Mori	James Ford	2023	
"The Child Inside"	Martin Gore	Delta Machine	Ben Hillier	2013	
"Christmas Island"	Martin Gore; Alan Wilder	B-side of "A Question of Lust"	Daniel Miller; Depeche Mode; Gareth Jones	1986	
"Clean"	Martin Gore	Violator	Depeche Mode; Flood	1990	
"Comatose"	Martin Gore	Exciter	Mark Bell	2001	
"Come Back"	Dave Gahan; Christian Eigner; Andrew Phillpott	Sounds of the Universe	Ben Hillier	2009	
"Condemnation"	Martin Gore	Songs of Faith and Devotion	Depeche Mode; Flood	1993	
"Corrupt" (Note: Includes a hidden reprise of "Wrong")	Martin Gore	Sounds of the Universe	Ben Hillier	2009	
"Cover Me"	Dave Gahan; Peter Gordeno; Christian Eigner	Spirit	James Ford	2017	
"Damaged People"	Martin Gore	Playing the Angel	Ben Hillier	2005	
"Dangerous"	Martin Gore	B-side of "Personal Jesus"	Depeche Mode; Flood	1990	
"The Darkest Star"	Martin Gore	Playing the Angel	Ben Hillier	2005	
"The Dead of Night"	Martin Gore	Exciter	Mark Bell	2001	
"Death's Door"	Martin Gore	Until the End of the World (soundtrack)	Depeche Mode	1991	
"Dirt"	Ron Asheton; Scott Asheton; Dave Alexander; Iggy Pop †	B-side of "I Feel Loved"	Mark Bell	2001	
"Don't Say You Love Me"	Martin Gore; Richard Butler	Memento Mori	James Ford	2023	
"Dream On"	Martin Gore	Exciter	Mark Bell	2001	
"Dreaming of Me"	Vince Clarke	Non-album single (UK); Speak & Spell (International editions)	Daniel Miller; Depeche Mode	1981	
"Dressed in Black" (Note: An earlier arrangement was first released on The RM EP in 1986. It was later reissued in 2020 as part of the "MODE" box set, on disc 16.)	Martin Gore	Black Celebration	Daniel Miller; Depeche Mode; Gareth Jones	1986	
"Easy Tiger" (Note: The album version is a shortened version with a duration of 2:05. The "Full Version" was released as a B-side of "Dream On" and has a duration of 4:55.)	Martin Gore	Exciter	Mark Bell	2001	
"Enjoy the Silence"	Martin Gore	Violator	Depeche Mode; Flood	1990	
"Esque"	Martin Gore	Sounds of the Universe (deluxe box set edition)	Ben Hillier	2009	
"Eternal"	Martin Gore	Spirit	James Ford	2017	
"Everything Counts" (Note: "Everything Counts (Reprise)" is included with "And Then..." as a hidden track on the original UK LP, and as a separate track on subsequent reissues.)	Martin Gore	Construction Time Again	Daniel Miller; Depeche Mode	1983	
"Excerpts From: My Secret Garden" (Note: Initial US pressings of A Broken Frame included the extended 12" version, "Further Excerpts From: My Secret Garden".)	Martin Gore	B-Side to "Leave in Silence"	Daniel Miller; Depeche Mode	1982	
"Fail"	Martin Gore	Spirit	James Ford	2017	
"Flexible"	Martin Gore	B-side of "Shake the Disease"	Daniel Miller; Depeche Mode; Gareth Jones	1985	
"Fly on the Windscreen" (Note: Remixed and included as an album track on Black Celebration as "Fly on the Windscreen - Final".)	Martin Gore	B-side of "It's Called a Heart"	Daniel Miller; Depeche Mode	1985	
"Fools"	Alan Wilder	B-Side of "Love, in Itself"	Depeche Mode; Daniel Miller	1983	
"Fpmip"	Martin Gore	B-Side of "Strangelove"	Depeche Mode; David Bascombe	1987	
"Fragile Tension"	Martin Gore	Sounds of the Universe	Ben Hillier	2009	
"Free"	Martin Gore	B-side of "Precious"	Ben Hillier	2005	
"Freelove"	Martin Gore	Exciter	Mark Bell	2001	
"Freestate"	Martin Gore	Ultra	Tim Simenon	1997	
"Get the Balance Right!"	Martin Gore	Non-album single	Daniel Miller; Depeche Mode	1981	
"Get Right with Me"	Martin Gore	Songs of Faith and Devotion	Depeche Mode; Flood	1993	
"Ghost"	Martin Gore	Sounds of the Universe (deluxe box set edition)	Ben Hillier	2009	
"Ghosts Again"	Martin Gore; Richard Butler	Memento Mori	James Ford	2023	
"Give Yourself To Me"	Martin Gore; Richard Butler	Memento Mori: Mexico City	James Ford	2025	
"Going Backwards"	Martin Gore	Spirit	James Ford	2017	
"Goodbye"	Martin Gore	Delta Machine	Ben Hillier	2013	
"Goodnight Lovers"	Martin Gore	Exciter	Mark Bell	2001	
"The Great Outdoors!"	Martin Gore; Alan Wilder	B-side of "Get the Balance Right!"	Daniel Miller; Depeche Mode	1981	
"Halo"	Martin Gore	Violator	Depeche Mode; Flood	1990	
"Happens All the Time"	Dave Gahan; Kurt Uenala	Delta Machine (Deluxe Edition)	Ben Hillier	2013	
"Happiest Girl" (Note: "Jack Mix" is the original version of the song.)	Martin Gore	B-side of "World in My Eyes"	Depeche Mode; Flood	1990	
"Headstar"	Martin Gore	B-side of "Only When I Lose Myself"	Tim Simenon	1998	
"Heaven"	Martin Gore	Delta Machine	Ben Hillier	2013	
"Here Is the House"	Martin Gore	Black Celebration	Daniel Miller; Depeche Mode; Gareth Jones	1986	
"'Heroes'" (Note: Played live during the Global Spirit Tour. Music video originally released on 22 September 2017. Was not included on a release until the MODE box set (disc 18) in 2020.)	David Bowie; Brian Eno †	MODE	James Ford	2020	
"Higher Love"	Martin Gore	Songs of Faith and Devotion	Depeche Mode; Flood	1993	
"Hole to Feed"	Dave Gahan; Christian Eigner; Andrew Phillpott	Sounds of the Universe	Ben Hillier	2009	
"Home"	Martin Gore	Ultra	Tim Simenon	1997	
"I Am You"	Martin Gore	Exciter	Mark Bell	2001	
"I Feel Loved"	Martin Gore	Exciter	Mark Bell	2001	
"I Feel You"	Martin Gore	Songs of Faith and Devotion	Depeche Mode; Flood	1993	
"I Sometimes Wish I Was Dead" (Note: An earlier arrangement was released with Flexipop issue 11 under the title "Sometimes I Wish I Was Dead".)	Vince Clarke	Speak & Spell	Daniel Miller; Depeche Mode	1981	
"I Want It All"	Dave Gahan; Christian Eigner; Andrew Phillpott	Playing the Angel	Ben Hillier	2005	
"I Want You Now"	Martin Gore	Music for the Masses	Depeche Mode; David Bascombe	1987	
"Ice Machine"	Vince Clarke	B-side of "Dreaming of Me"	Daniel Miller; Depeche Mode	1981	
"If You Want"	Alan Wilder	Some Great Reward	Daniel Miller; Depeche Mode; Gareth Jones	1984	
"In Chains"	Martin Gore	Sounds of the Universe	Ben Hillier	2009	
"In Sympathy"	Martin Gore	Sounds of the Universe	Ben Hillier	2009	
"In The End"	Martin Gore; Richard Butler	Memento Mori: Mexico City	James Ford	2025	
"In Your Memory"	Alan Wilder	B-side of "People Are People"	Daniel Miller; Depeche Mode; Gareth Jones	1984	
"In Your Room"	Martin Gore	Songs of Faith and Devotion	Depeche Mode; Flood	1993	
"Insight"	Martin Gore	Ultra	Tim Simenon	1997	
"Interlude No. 1 – Mission Impossible" (Note: Included as a hidden track with "Pimpf")	Martin Gore	Music for the Masses	Depeche Mode; David Bascombe	1987	
"Interlude No. 2 – Crucified" (Note: Included as a hidden track with "Enjoy the Silence". Notable for being the only song where Andy Fletcher is credited as the lead singer.)	Martin Gore	Violator	Depeche Mode; Flood	1990	
"Interlude No. 3" (Note: Included as a hidden track with "Blue Dress")	Martin Gore	Violator	Depeche Mode; Flood	1990	
"Interlude No. 4" (Note: Included as a hidden track with "Get Right With Me")	Martin Gore	Songs of Faith and Devotion	Depeche Mode; Flood	1993	
"Introspectre"	Martin Gore	Playing the Angel	Ben Hillier	2005	
"It Doesn't Matter"	Martin Gore	Some Great Reward	Daniel Miller; Depeche Mode; Gareth Jones	1984	
"It Doesn't Matter Two"	Martin Gore	Black Celebration	Daniel Miller; Depeche Mode; Gareth Jones	1986	
"It's Called a Heart"	Martin Gore	The Singles 81→85	Daniel Miller; Depeche Mode	1985	
"It's No Good"	Martin Gore	Ultra	Tim Simenon	1997	
"Jazz Thieves"	Martin Gore	Ultra	Tim Simenon	1997	
"Jezebel"	Martin Gore	Sounds of the Universe	Ben Hillier	2009	
"John the Revelator"	Martin Gore	Playing the Angel	Ben Hillier	2005	
"Judas"	Martin Gore	Songs of Faith and Devotion	Depeche Mode; Flood	1993	
"Junior Painkiller" (Note: Included as a hidden track with "Insight" on initial releases. It is separated on US CD and digital releases.)	Martin Gore	Ultra	Tim Simenon	1997	
"Just Can't Get Enough"	Vince Clarke	Speak & Spell	Daniel Miller; Depeche Mode	1981	
"Kaleid"	Martin Gore	B-side of "Policy of Truth"	Depeche Mode; Flood	1990	
"The Landscape Is Changing"	Alan Wilder	Construction Time Again	Daniel Miller; Depeche Mode	1983	
"Leave in Silence" (Note: Initial US pressings of A Broken Frame included the extended 12" version "Leave in Silence (Longer)" instead.)	Martin Gore	A Broken Frame	Daniel Miller; Depeche Mode	1982	
"Lie to Me"	Martin Gore	Some Great Reward	Daniel Miller; Depeche Mode; Gareth Jones	1984	
"Life 2.0"	Martin Gore	Memento Mori: Mexico City	James Ford	2025	
"Light"	Martin Gore	Sounds of the Universe (deluxe box set edition)	Ben Hillier	2009	
"Lilian"	Martin Gore	Playing the Angel	Ben Hillier	2005	
"Little 15"	Martin Gore	Music for the Masses	Depeche Mode; David Bascombe	1987	
"Little Soul"	Martin Gore	Sounds of the Universe	Ben Hillier	2009	
"Long Time Lie"	Martin Gore; Dave Gahan	Delta Machine (Deluxe Edition)	Ben Hillier	2013	
"Love, in Itself"	Martin Gore	Construction Time Again	Daniel Miller; Depeche Mode	1983	
"The Love Thieves"	Martin Gore	Ultra	Tim Simenon	1997	
"Lovetheme"	Martin Gore	Exciter	Mark Bell	2001	
"Macro"	Martin Gore	Playing the Angel	Ben Hillier	2005	
"Martyr"	Martin Gore	The Best of Depeche Mode Volume 1	Ben Hillier	2006	
"Master and Servant"	Martin Gore	Some Great Reward	Daniel Miller; Depeche Mode; Gareth Jones	1984	
"The Meaning of Love"	Martin Gore	A Broken Frame	Daniel Miller; Depeche Mode	1982	
"Memphisto"	Martin Gore	B-side of "Enjoy the Silence"	Depeche Mode; Flood	1990	
"Mercy in You"	Martin Gore	Songs of Faith and Devotion	Depeche Mode; Flood	1993	
"Miles Away/The Truth Is"	Dave Gahan; Christian Eigner; Andrew Phillpott	Sounds of the Universe	Ben Hillier	2009	
"Monument"	Martin Gore	A Broken Frame	Daniel Miller; Depeche Mode	1982	
"More Than a Party"	Martin Gore	Construction Time Again	Daniel Miller; Depeche Mode	1983	
"My Cosmos Is Mine"	Martin Gore	Memento Mori	James Ford	2023	
"My Favourite Stranger"	Martin Gore; Richard Butler	Memento Mori	James Ford	2023	
"My Joy"	Martin Gore	B-side of "Walking in My Shoes"	Depeche Mode; Flood	1993	
"My Little Universe"	Martin Gore	Delta Machine	Ben Hillier	2013	
"My Secret Garden"	Martin Gore	A Broken Frame	Daniel Miller; Depeche Mode	1982	
"Never Let Me Down Again"	Martin Gore	Music for the Masses	Depeche Mode; David Bascombe	1987	
"Never Let Me Go"	Martin Gore	Memento Mori	James Ford	2023	
"Never Turn Your Back On Mother Earth" (Note: Released on a Flexi-disc and sent to members of the official fan club. Played live at select shows of the final two legs of the Music For the Masses tour. Later included on Martin Gore's Counterfeit EP.)	Ron Mael †	Happy Christmas 87 from Depeche Mode	Depeche Mode	1987	
"New Dress"	Martin Gore	Black Celebration	Daniel Miller; Depeche Mode; Gareth Jones	1986	
"New Life"	Vince Clarke	Speak & Spell	Daniel Miller; Depeche Mode	1981	
"Newborn"	Martin Gore	B-side of "A Pain That I'm Used To" (EU)	Ben Hillier	2005	
"No More (This Is the Last Time)"	Dave Gahan; Kurt Uenala	Spirit	James Ford	2017	
"Nodisco"	Vince Clarke	Speak & Spell	Daniel Miller; Depeche Mode	1981	
"Nothing"	Martin Gore	Music for the Masses	Depeche Mode; David Bascombe	1987	
"Nothing to Fear"	Martin Gore	A Broken Frame	Daniel Miller; Depeche Mode	1982	
"Nothing's Impossible"	Dave Gahan; Christian Eigner; Andrew Phillpott	Playing the Angel	Ben Hillier	2005	
"Now, This Is Fun"	Martin Gore	B-side of "See You"	Daniel Miller; Depeche Mode	1982	
"Oberkorn (It's a Small Town)"	Martin Gore	B-side of "The Meaning of Love"	Daniel Miller; Depeche Mode	1982	
"Oh Well"	Dave Gahan; Martin Gore	B-Side of "Wrong"	Ben Hillier	2009	
"One Caress"	Martin Gore	Songs of Faith and Devotion	Depeche Mode; Flood	1993	
"Only When I Lose Myself"	Martin Gore	The Singles 86>98	Tim Simenon	1998	
"A Pain That I'm Used To"	Martin Gore	Playing the Angel	Ben Hillier	2005	
"Painkiller"	Martin Gore	B-side of "Barrel of a Gun"	Tim Simenon	1997	
"Peace"	Martin Gore	Sounds of the Universe	Ben Hillier	2009	
"People Are Good"	Martin Gore	Memento Mori	James Ford	2023	
"People Are People"	Martin Gore	Some Great Reward	Daniel Miller; Depeche Mode; Gareth Jones	1984	
"Perfect"	Martin Gore	Sounds of the Universe	Ben Hillier	2009	
"Personal Jesus"	Martin Gore	Violator	Depeche Mode; Flood	1990	
"A Photograph of You"	Martin Gore	A Broken Frame	Daniel Miller; Depeche Mode	1982	
"Photographic" (Note: An earlier arrangement was initially released on the Some Bizzare Album.)	Vince Clarke	Speak & Spell	Daniel Miller; Depeche Mode	1981	
"Pimpf"	Martin Gore	Music for the Masses	Depeche Mode; David Bascombe	1987	
"Pipeline"	Martin Gore	Construction Time Again	Daniel Miller; Depeche Mode	1983	
"Pleasure, Little Treasure"	Martin Gore	B-side of "Never Let Me Down Again"	Depeche Mode; David Bascombe	1987	
"Poison Heart"	Dave Gahan; Peter Gordeno; Christian Eigner	Spirit	James Ford	2017	
"Policy of Truth"	Martin Gore	Violator	Depeche Mode; Flood	1990	
"Poorman"	Martin Gore	Spirit	James Ford	2017	
"Precious"	Martin Gore	Playing the Angel	Ben Hillier	2005	
"Puppets"	Vince Clarke	Speak & Spell	Daniel Miller; Depeche Mode	1981	
"A Question of Lust"	Martin Gore	Black Celebration	Daniel Miller; Depeche Mode; Gareth Jones	1986	
"A Question of Time"	Martin Gore	Black Celebration	Daniel Miller; Depeche Mode; Gareth Jones	1986	
"Route 66"	Robert William Troup Jr. †	B-side of "Behind the Wheel"	Depeche Mode; David Bascombe	1987	
"Rush"	Martin Gore	Songs of Faith and Devotion	Depeche Mode; Flood	1993	
"Sacred"	Martin Gore	Music for the Masses	Depeche Mode; David Bascombe	1987	
"Satellite"	Martin Gore	A Broken Frame	Daniel Miller; Depeche Mode	1982	
"Scum"	Martin Gore	Spirit	James Ford	2017	
"Sea of Sin" (Note: "Tonal Mix" is the original version of the song.)	Martin Gore	B-side of "World in My Eyes"	Depeche Mode; Flood	1990	
"Secret to the End"	Dave Gahan; Kurt Uenala	Delta Machine	Ben Hillier	2013	
"See You"	Martin Gore	A Broken Frame	Daniel Miller; Depeche Mode	1982	
"(Set Me Free) Remotivate Me"	Martin Gore	B-side of "Master and Servant"	Daniel Miller; Depeche Mode; Gareth Jones	1984	
"Shake the Disease"	Martin Gore	The Singles 81→85	Daniel Miller; Depeche Mode; Gareth Jones	1985	
"Shame"	Martin Gore	Construction Time Again	Daniel Miller; Depeche Mode	1983	
"Shine"	Martin Gore	Exciter	Mark Bell	2001	
"Should Be Higher"	Dave Gahan; Kurt Uenala	Delta Machine	Ben Hillier	2013	
"Shouldn't Have Done That"	Martin Gore	A Broken Frame	Daniel Miller; Depeche Mode	1982	
"Shout!"	Vince Clarke	B-side of "New Life"	Daniel Miller; Depeche Mode	1981	
"Sibeling"	Martin Gore	B-side of "Enjoy the Silence"	Depeche Mode; Flood	1990	
"The Sinner in Me"	Martin Gore	Playing the Angel	Ben Hillier	2005	
"Sister of Night"	Martin Gore	Ultra	Tim Simenon	1997	
"Slow"	Martin Gore	Delta Machine	Ben Hillier	2013	
"Slowblow"	Martin Gore	B-side of "It's No Good"	Tim Simenon	1997	
"So Cruel"	U2; Bono †	AHK-toong BAY-bi Covered	Depeche Mode	2011	
"So Much Love"	Martin Gore	Spirit	James Ford	2017	
"Soft Touch/Raw Nerve"	Martin Gore	Delta Machine	Ben Hillier	2013	
"Somebody"	Martin Gore	Some Great Reward	Daniel Miller; Depeche Mode; Gareth Jones	1984	
"Something to Do"	Martin Gore	Some Great Reward	Daniel Miller; Depeche Mode; Gareth Jones	1984	
"Sometimes"	Martin Gore	Black Celebration	Daniel Miller; Depeche Mode; Gareth Jones	1986	
"Sonata No. 14 in C#m (Moonlight Sonata)"	Ludwig van Beethoven †	B-side of "Little 15"	Depeche Mode; David Bascombe	1987	
"Soothe My Soul"	Martin Gore	Delta Machine	Ben Hillier	2013	
"Soul with Me"	Martin Gore	Memento Mori	James Ford	2023	
"Spacewalker"	Martin Gore	Sounds of the Universe	Ben Hillier	2009	
"Speak to Me"	Dave Gahan; Christian Eigner; James Ford; Marta Salogni	Memento Mori	James Ford	2023	
"Stories of Old"	Martin Gore	Some Great Reward	Daniel Miller; Depeche Mode; Gareth Jones	1984	
"Stjärna" (Note: Often incorrectly referred to as "St. Jarna". "Stjärna" is Swedish for "star".)	Martin Gore	B-side of "Little 15"	Depeche Mode; David Bascombe	1987	
"Strangelove"	Martin Gore	Music for the Masses	Depeche Mode; David Bascombe	1987	
"Stripped"	Martin Gore	Black Celebration	Daniel Miller; Depeche Mode; Gareth Jones	1986	
"Suffer Well"	Dave Gahan; Christian Eigner; Andrew Phillpott	Playing the Angel	Ben Hillier	2005	
"The Sun & the Rainfall"	Martin Gore	A Broken Frame	Daniel Miller; Depeche Mode	1982	
"The Sun and the Moon and the Stars"	Martin Gore	Sounds of the Universe (deluxe box set edition)	Ben Hillier	2009	
"Surrender"	Martin Gore	B-side of "Only When I Lose Myself"	Tim Simenon	1998	
"Survive"	Dave Gahan; Martin Gore	Memento Mori: Mexico City	James Ford	2025	
"The Sweetest Condition"	Martin Gore	Exciter	Mark Bell	2001	
"Sweetest Perfection"	Martin Gore	Violator	Depeche Mode; Flood	1990	
"The Things You Said"	Martin Gore	Music for the Masses	Depeche Mode; David Bascombe	1987	
"To Have and to Hold" (Note: Two versions of this song were recorded. The "Spanish Taster" version more closely resembled the original demo and was included as a B-side to "Never Let Me Down Again" and certain CD releases of Music for the Masses.)	Martin Gore	Music for the Masses	Depeche Mode; David Bascombe	1987	
"Told You So"	Martin Gore	Construction Time Again	Daniel Miller; Depeche Mode	1983	
"Tora! Tora! Tora!"	Martin Gore	Speak & Spell	Daniel Miller; Depeche Mode	1981	
"Two Minute Warning"	Alan Wilder	Construction Time Again	Daniel Miller; Depeche Mode	1983	
"Universal Soldier"	Buffy Sainte-Marie †	Help(2)	James Ford	2026	
"Uselink"	Martin Gore	Ultra	Tim Simenon	1997	
"Useless"	Martin Gore	Ultra	Tim Simenon	1997	
"Wagging Tongue"	Dave Gahan; Martin Gore	Memento Mori	James Ford	2023	
"Waiting for the Night" (Note: A "bare" version appears on the iTunes edition of Playing the Angel (2005))	Martin Gore	Violator	Depeche Mode; Flood	1990	
"Walking in My Shoes"	Martin Gore	Songs of Faith and Devotion	Depeche Mode; Flood	1993	
"Welcome to My World"	Martin Gore	Delta Machine	Ben Hillier	2013	
"What's Your Name?"	Vince Clarke	Speak & Spell	Daniel Miller; Depeche Mode	1981	
"When the Body Speaks"	Martin Gore	Exciter	Mark Bell	2001	
"Where's the Revolution"	Martin Gore	Spirit	James Ford	2017	
"Work Hard"	Martin Gore; Alan Wilder	B-side of "Everything Counts"	Daniel Miller; Depeche Mode	1983	
"World Full of Nothing"	Martin Gore	Black Celebration	Daniel Miller; Depeche Mode; Gareth Jones	1986	
"World in My Eyes"	Martin Gore	Violator	Depeche Mode; Flood	1990	
"The Worst Crime"	Martin Gore	Spirit	James Ford	2017	
"Wrong"	Martin Gore	Sounds of the Universe	Ben Hillier	2009	
"You Move"	Martin Gore; Dave Gahan	Spirit	James Ford	2017	
"Zenstation"	Martin Gore	B-side of "Freelove"	Mark Bell	2001	

== Unreleased songs ==
The following songs are known to have been demoed or partially recorded by the band or its members, but not included on any official release.

Name of song, writer(s), and year of recording
Song	Writer(s)	Year	Notes	Ref(s)
"Mother Me"	Martin Gore	1989	Alan Wilder: "It sort of got started with some drums, bass + a couple of other parts but was shelved quite quickly. It was medium tempo and if I remember correctly it slipped into 7/8 time signature for the chorus – oops. I think Dave would have sung it."	
"Radio News"	Vince Clarke	1980	–	
"Television Set"	Jason Knott †	1980	–	
"Unknown Instrumental"	Vince Clarke	1980	The true title of this track is unknown	
"Unknown Song"	Vince Clarke	1980	The true title of this track is unknown	
