= Memento Mori World Tour =

2023–24 concert tour by Depeche Mode

- Tour by Depeche Mode
- Promotional poster for the tour
- Location: Europe; North America
- Associated album: Memento Mori
- Start date: 23 March 2023
- End date: 8 April 2024
- Legs: 4
- No. of shows: 45 in North America; 67 in Europe; 112 in total

Depeche Mode concert chronology
- Global Spirit Tour (2017–18); Memento Mori World Tour (2023–24); ...

The Memento Mori World Tour was a worldwide concert tour by the English electronic band Depeche Mode in support of the band's fifteenth studio album, Memento Mori. The tour began on 23 March 2023 and concluded on 8 April 2024. This marked the first concert tour not to feature keyboardist Andy Fletcher, who died in 2022.

The tour was first announced on 4 October 2022, along with the Memento Mori album announcement at an event in Berlin. A third leg of the tour for North America was announced on 16 February 2023, with 34 additional shows. On 10 July 2023, a second European leg of the tour has been announced with 29 new dates in indoor arenas.

The 21, 23 and 25 September 2023 shows in Mexico City were recorded for the film Depeche Mode: M (2025). Directed by Fernando Frías. The film follows the band during its Mexico City stop on the Memento Mori Tour, which saw them play to more than 3 million fans at 112 shows around the world. It was released in the United Kingdom and the United States on October 28, 2025.

== Background ==
On 29 September 2022, Depeche Mode took to their social media channels to post a teaser of an upcoming announcement, reading "Berlin 4.10.22". On 4 October 2022, a special event was held at the Theater am Schiffbauerdamm in Berlin hosted by Barbara Charone, and was streamed live on YouTube. Dave Gahan and Martin Gore were present to discuss details regarding their upcoming world tour to support the new album.

Two shows on the tour were part of the Primavera Sound festival in Barcelona and Madrid, which Depeche Mode headlined on Fridays 2 June and 9 June 2023.

The band performed at Smoothie King Center in New Orleans, Louisiana on 7 October 2023, nearly 30 years to the day after Gahan’s near-death experience in the city when he suffered a heart attack at Lakefront Arena during the Devotional Tour.

"Black Celebration" and "Policy of Truth" made their tour debuts at New York City's Barclays Center on 21 October 2023.

Performances of "World in My Eyes" on this tour were dedicated to Fletcher, as it was his favourite Depeche Mode song. During the song photos of Fletcher were shown on the video screen, and Dave Gahan moved to Fletcher's usual position on stage left at the end of the track.

== Setlist ==
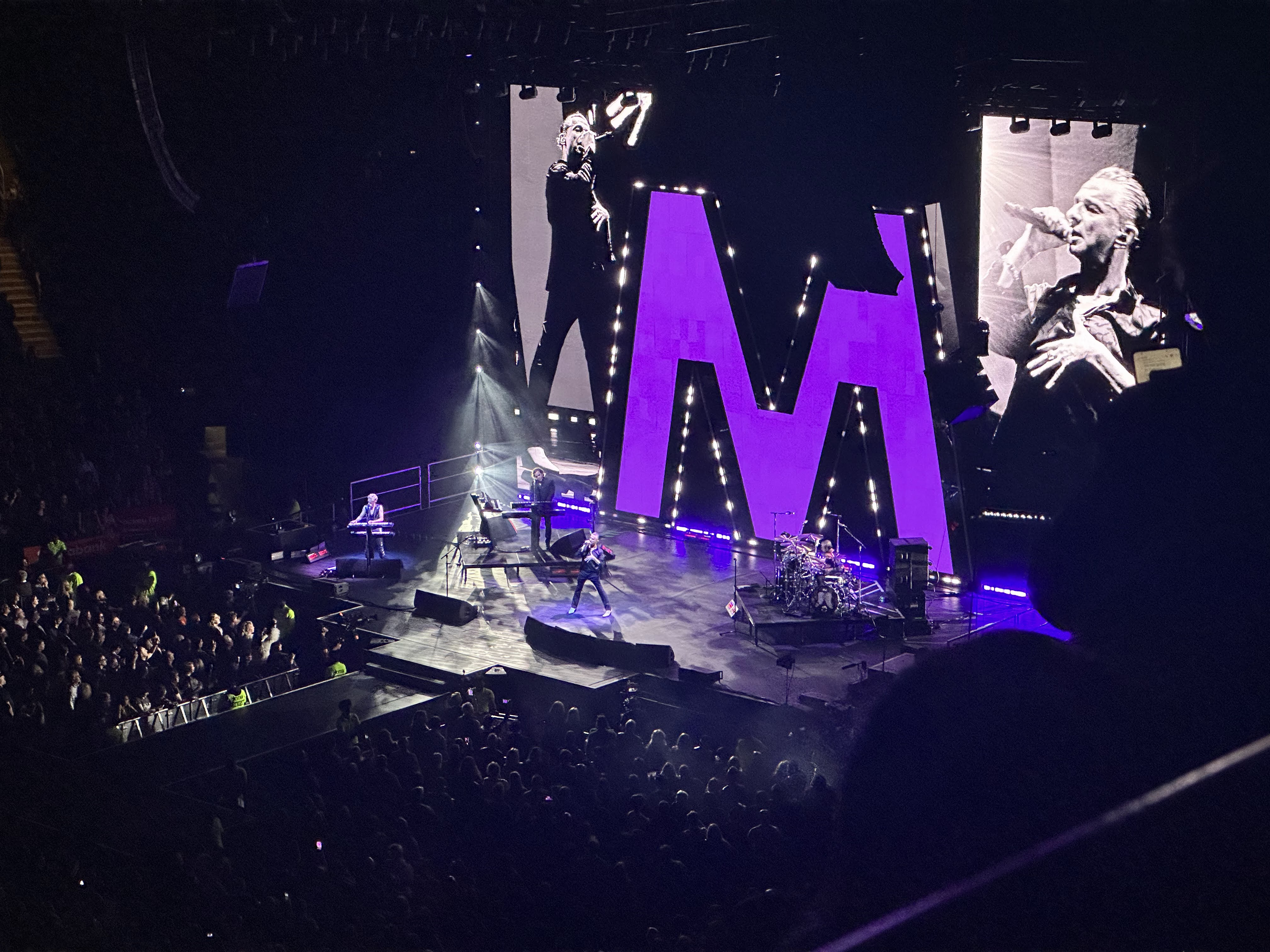
Depeche Mode at Scotiabank Arena, April 2023

Setlist for North America (legs #1 and #3) and Europe (legs #2 and #4) (Note: At the show in Edmonton, Canada, "A Question of Lust" was on the printed setlist but was not performed due to Martin Gore's vocal problems.)

1. "My Cosmos Is Mine"
2. "Wagging Tongue"
3. "Walking in My Shoes"
  - "It's No Good"
4. "It's No Good"
  - "Walking in My Shoes"
5. "Sister of Night"
  - "Policy of Truth"
6. "In Your Room" (Zephyr mix)
7. "Everything Counts"
8. "Precious"
9. "Speak to Me"
  - "My Favourite Stranger"
  - "Before We Drown"
10. "A Question of Lust" (*)
  - "Home" (*)
  - "Strangelove" (acoustic) (*)
11. "Soul with Me" (acoustic) (*)
  - "Shake the Disease" (acoustic) (*)
  - "Strangelove" (acoustic) (*)
  - "But Not Tonight" (acoustic) (*)
  - "Dressed in Black" (acoustic) (*)
  - "Heaven" (acoustic) (*)
  - "Somebody" (*)
  - "Home" (acoustic) (*)
12. "Ghosts Again"
13. "I Feel You"
14. "A Pain That I'm Used To" (Jacques Lu Cont remix)
15. "World in My Eyes"
  - "Behind the Wheel"
16. "Wrong"
  - "Black Celebration"
17. "Stripped"
18. "John the Revelator"
  - "Behind the Wheel"
19. "Enjoy the Silence"
  Encore
20. "Waiting for the Night" (acoustic)
  - "Condemnation" (acoustic)
21. "Just Can't Get Enough"
22. "Never Let Me Down Again"
23. "Personal Jesus"

Setlist for European festival concerts (leg #2)

Depeche Mode performed at the Primavera Sound festival in Spain and omitted some songs from their setlist.

1. "My Cosmos Is Mine"
2. "Wagging Tongue"
3. "Walking in My Shoes"
4. "It's No Good"
5. "In Your Room" (Zephyr mix)
6. "Everything Counts"
7. "Precious"
8. "Home" (*)
9. "Ghosts Again"
10. "I Feel You"
11. "A Pain That I'm Used To" (Jacques Lu Cont remix)
12. "World in My Eyes"
13. "Stripped"
14. "John the Revelator"
15. "Enjoy the Silence"
  Encore
16. "Just Can't Get Enough"
17. "Never Let Me Down Again"
18. "Personal Jesus"

Note: "(*)" denotes song sung by Martin Gore.

== Tour dates ==
List of 2023 concerts, showing date, city, country, venue, opening acts, tickets sold, number of available tickets and amount of gross revenue
Date	City	Country	Venue	Opening act(s)	Attendance / Capacity	Revenue
23 March 2023	Sacramento	United States	Golden 1 Center	Kelly Lee Owens	13,228 / 13,228	$3,027,464
25 March 2023	San Jose	United States	SAP Center	Kelly Lee Owens	13,306 / 13,306	$3,058,803
28 March 2023	Inglewood	United States	Kia Forum	Kelly Lee Owens	14,669 / 14,669	$3,447,447
30 March 2023	Las Vegas	United States	T-Mobile Arena	Kelly Lee Owens	15,224 / 15,224	$3,303,929
2 April 2023	San Antonio	United States	AT&T Center	Kelly Lee Owens	15,308 / 15,308	$3,011,214
5 April 2023	Chicago	United States	United Center	Kelly Lee Owens	15,144 / 15,144	$3,209,101
7 April 2023	Toronto	Canada	Scotiabank Arena	Kelly Lee Owens	15,341 / 15,341	$2,124,793
9 April 2023	Quebec City	Canada	Videotron Centre	Kelly Lee Owens	12,455 / 12,455	$1,116,191
12 April 2023	Montreal	Canada	Bell Centre	Kelly Lee Owens	15,580 / 15,580	$1,655,868
14 April 2023	New York City	United States	Madison Square Garden	Stella Rose & the Dead Language	14,926 / 14,926	$3,302,047
16 May 2023	Amsterdam	Netherlands	Ziggo Dome	Cold Cave	32,259 / 32,259	$3,258,467
18 May 2023	Amsterdam	Netherlands	Ziggo Dome	Cold Cave	32,259 / 32,259	$3,258,467
20 May 2023	Antwerp	Belgium	Sportpaleis	Cold Cave	16,668 / 16,668	$1,668,464
23 May 2023	Stockholm	Sweden	Friends Arena	Cold Cave	43,876 / 46,816	$3,656,147
26 May 2023	Leipzig	Germany	Festwiese	Cold Cave	73,726 / 73,726	$5,431,590
28 May 2023	Bratislava	Slovakia	Tehelné pole	Cold Cave	29,644 / 29,644	$1,784,676
31 May 2023	Lyon	France	Groupama Stadium	Young Fathers	47,864 / 47,864	$4,187,631
2 June 2023 (Note: The show on June 2 was part of Primavera Sound.)	Barcelona	Spain	Parc del Fòrum	—	––	––
4 June 2023	Düsseldorf	Germany	Merkur Spiel-Arena	Young Fathers	86,208 / 88,500	$8,796,287
6 June 2023	Düsseldorf	Germany	Merkur Spiel-Arena	Young Fathers	86,208 / 88,500	$8,796,287
9 June 2023 (Note: The show on June 9 was part of Primavera Sound Madrid.)	Madrid	Spain	Arganda del Rey	—	––	––
11 June 2023	Bern	Switzerland	Stadion Wankdorf	Young Fathers	36,378 / 36,378	$4,460,831
14 June 2023	Malahide	Ireland	Malahide Castle	Young Fathers, Just Mustard	24,475 / 24,475	$2,982,689
17 June 2023	London	England	Twickenham Stadium	Young Fathers	53,981 / 53,981	$6,018,433
20 June 2023	Munich	Germany	Olympiastadion	Young Fathers	66,564 / 66,564	$6,839,023
22 June 2023	Lille	France	Stade Pierre-Mauroy	Jehnny Beth	34,642 / 34,642	$2,890,643
24 June 2023	Saint-Denis	France	Stade de France	Jehnny Beth	70,720 / 70,720	$5,725,938
27 June 2023	Copenhagen	Denmark	Parken Stadium	Jehnny Beth	47,000 / 47,000	$4,906,330
29 June 2023	Frankfurt	Germany	Deutsche Bank Park	Jehnny Beth	92,106 / 94,438	$9,385,081
1 July 2023	Frankfurt	Germany	Deutsche Bank Park	Jehnny Beth	92,106 / 94,438	$9,385,081
4 July 2023	Bordeaux	France	Matmut Atlantique	Jehnny Beth	37,226 / 37,226	$3,536,746
7 July 2023	Berlin	Germany	Olympiastadion	Jehnny Beth	141,839 / 141,839	$14,535,661
9 July 2023	Berlin	Germany	Olympiastadion	Hælos	141,839 / 141,839	$14,535,661
12 July 2023	Rome	Italy	Stadio Olimpico	Hælos	58,648 / 58,648	$5,196,865
14 July 2023	Milan	Italy	San Siro	Hælos	54,948 / 54,948	$4,768,224
16 July 2023	Bologna	Italy	Stadio Renato Dall'Ara	Hælos	35,578 / 35,578	$2,869,175
21 July 2023	Klagenfurt	Austria	Wörthersee Stadion	Hælos	36,681 / 36,681	$3,387,525
23 July 2023	Zagreb	Croatia	Arena Zagreb	Hælos	16,236 / 16,236	$1,438,662
26 July 2023	Bucharest	Romania	Arena Națională	Hælos	46,634 / 46,634	$3,248,130
28 July 2023	Budapest	Hungary	Puskás Aréna	Hope	47,613 / 47,613	$3,487,255
30 July 2023	Prague	Czech Republic	Letňany	Hope	58,230 / 58,230	$4,297,450
2 August 2023	Warsaw	Poland	PGE Narodowy	Hope	50,107 / 52,396	$4,679,040
4 August 2023	Kraków	Poland	Tauron Arena	Hope	15,390 / 15,640	$1,583,567
6 August 2023	Tallinn	Estonia	Tallinn Song Festival Grounds	Hope	52,163 / 52,163	$4,284,969
11 August 2023	Oslo	Norway	Telenor Arena	Hope	19,687 / 19,687	$2,190,885
21 September 2023	Mexico City	Mexico	Foro Sol	Kelly Lee Owens	193,912 / 193,912	$15,401,768
23 September 2023	Mexico City	Mexico	Foro Sol	Kelly Lee Owens	193,912 / 193,912	$15,401,768
25 September 2023	Mexico City	Mexico	Foro Sol	Kelly Lee Owens	193,912 / 193,912	$15,401,768
29 September 2023	Austin	United States	Moody Center	DIIV	12,297 / 12,297	$2,170,257
1 October 2023	Dallas	United States	American Airlines Center	DIIV	14,142 / 14,142	$2,331,628
4 October 2023	Houston	United States	Toyota Center	DIIV	12,422 / 12,422	$1,990,834
7 October 2023	New Orleans	United States	Smoothie King Center	DIIV	13,639 / 13,639	$2,228,532
10 October 2023	Orlando	United States	Amway Center	DIIV	13,252 / 13,607	$1,822,502
12 October 2023	Miami	United States	Kaseya Center	DIIV	13,649 / 13,649	$2,182,397
15 October 2023	Atlanta	United States	State Farm Arena	DIIV	12,232 / 12,232	$1,903,326
19 October 2023	Nashville	United States	Bridgestone Arena	DIIV	13,978 / 13,978	$1,846,005
21 October 2023	Brooklyn	United States	Barclays Center	DIIV	14,752 / 14,752	$2,449,228
23 October 2023	Washington, D.C.	United States	Capital One Arena	DIIV	14,396 / 14,396	$2,084,100
25 October 2023	Philadelphia	United States	Wells Fargo Center	DIIV	12,336 / 13,395	$1,881,500
28 October 2023	New York City	United States	Madison Square Garden	DIIV	14,867 / 14,867	$2,571,362
31 October 2023	Boston	United States	TD Garden	DIIV	12,655 / 13,007	$1,958,455
3 November 2023	Montreal	Canada	Bell Centre	DIIV	15,642 / 15,642	$1,303,587
5 November 2023	Toronto	Canada	Scotiabank Arena	DIIV	14,812 / 14,812	$1,644,639
8 November 2023	Detroit	United States	Little Caesars Arena	DIIV	15,019 / 15,019	$1,919,395
10 November 2023	Cleveland	United States	Rocket Mortgage FieldHouse	DIIV	14,432 / 14,432	$2,428,993
13 November 2023	Chicago	United States	United Center	DIIV	14,637 / 14,637	$2,892,736
16 November 2023	Denver	United States	Ball Arena	Young Fathers	13,685 / 13,685	$2,355,116
18 November 2023	Salt Lake City	United States	Delta Center	Young Fathers	11,568 / 11,568	$2,221,524
21 November 2023	Edmonton	Canada	Rogers Place	Young Fathers	12,679 / 12,679	$976,968
24 November 2023	Vancouver	Canada	Rogers Arena	Young Fathers	13,997 / 13,997	$2,260,251
26 November 2023	Seattle	United States	Climate Pledge Arena	Young Fathers	14,544 / 14,544	$2,367,512
28 November 2023	Portland	United States	Moda Center	Young Fathers	12,985 / 12,985	$1,476,347
1 December 2023	Las Vegas	United States	T-Mobile Arena	Young Fathers	15,142 / 15,142	$2,547,369
3 December 2023	San Francisco	United States	Chase Center	Young Fathers	13,550 / 13,550	$2,470,116
6 December 2023	San Diego	United States	Pechanga Arena	Young Fathers	22,703 / 22,703	$4,008,534
8 December 2023	San Diego	United States	Pechanga Arena	Young Fathers	22,703 / 22,703	$4,008,534
10 December 2023	Inglewood	United States	Kia Forum	Young Fathers	28,136 / 28,136	$4,541,440
12 December 2023	Inglewood	United States	Kia Forum	Young Fathers	28,136 / 28,136	$4,541,440
15 December 2023	Los Angeles	United States	Crypto.com Arena	Young Fathers	28,749 / 28,749	$4,989,928
17 December 2023	Los Angeles	United States	Crypto.com Arena	Young Fathers	28,749 / 28,749	$4,989,928

List of 2024 concerts, showing date, city, country, venue, opening acts, tickets sold, number of available tickets and amount of gross revenue
Date	City	Country	Venue	Opening act(s)	Attendance / Capacity	Revenue
22 January 2024	London	England	The O_{2} Arena	Nadine Shah	34,843 / 34,843 (Note: Boxscores combined from 22 and 27 January)	$3,872,896
24 January 2024	Birmingham	England	Utilita Arena Birmingham	Nadine Shah	14,691 / 14,691	$1,621,722
27 January 2024	London	England	The O2 Arena	Nadine Shah		
29 January 2024	Manchester	England	AO Arena	Nadine Shah	15,416 / 15,416	$1,645,165
31 January 2024	Glasgow	Scotland	OVO Hydro	Nadine Shah	13,444 / 13,444	$1,525,564
3 February 2024	Dublin	Ireland	3Arena	Nadine Shah	13,829 / 13,829	$2,139,543
6 February 2024	Antwerp	Belgium	Sportpaleis	Nadine Shah	19,230 / 19,230	$2,286,789
8 February 2024	Amsterdam	Netherlands	Ziggo Dome	Nadine Shah	15,596 / 15,596	$1,882,374
10 February 2024	Copenhagen	Denmark	Royal Arena	Nadine Shah	14,327 / 14,327	$2,263,426
13 February 2024	Berlin	Germany	Merecedes-Benz Arena	Humanist	40,422 / 40,422 (Note: Boxscores combined from 13, 15 and 20 February)	$6,841,697
15 February 2024	Berlin	Germany	Merecedes-Benz Arena	Humanist	40,422 / 40,422	$6,841,697
17 February 2024	Hamburg	Germany	Barclays Arena	Humanist	11,368 / 11,368	$1,854,187
20 February 2024	Berlin	Germany	Mercedes-Benz Arena	Humanist		
22 February 2024	Prague	Czech Republic	O_{2} Arena	Humanist	32,368 / 32,368	$3,677,560
24 February 2024	Prague	Czech Republic	O_{2} Arena	Humanist	32,368 / 32,368	$3,677,560
27 February 2024	Łódź	Poland	Atlas Arena	Humanist	32,185 / 32,185	$3,489,241
29 February 2024	Łódź	Poland	Atlas Arena	Humanist	32,185 / 32,185	$3,489,241
3 March 2024	Paris	France	Accor Arena	Suzie Stapleton	30,257 / 30,257	$3,388,563
5 March 2024	Paris	France	Accor Arena	Suzie Stapleton	30,257 / 30,257	$3,388,563
7 March 2024	Munich	Germany	Olympiahalle	Suzie Stapleton	11,456 / 11,456	$1,550,441
12 March 2024	Madrid	Spain	WiZink Center	Suzie Stapleton	31,227 / 31,227	$3,850,771
14 March 2024	Madrid	Spain	WiZink Center	Suzie Stapleton	31,227 / 31,227	$3,850,771
16 March 2024	Barcelona	Spain	Palau Sant Jordi	Suzie Stapleton	17,190 / 17,190	$1,893,613
19 March 2024	Lisbon	Portugal	Altice Arena	Suzie Stapleton	18,531 / 18,531	$1,731,413
21 March 2024	Bilbao	Spain	Bizkaia Arena	Suzie Stapleton	16,180 / 16,180	$1,421,872
23 March 2024	Turin	Italy	Pala Alpitour	Deeper	12,620 / 12,620	$1,228,222
26 March 2024	Budapest	Hungary	MVM Dome	Deeper	16,986 / 16,986	$1,643,679
28 March 2024	Assago	Italy	Mediolanum Forum	Deeper	23,663 / 23,663	$2,196,466
30 March 2024	Assago	Italy	Mediolanum Forum	Deeper	23,663 / 23,663	$2,196,466
3 April 2024	Cologne	Germany	Lanxess Arena	Deeper	50,185 / 50,185	$7,135,332
5 April 2024	Cologne	Germany	Lanxess Arena	Deeper	50,185 / 50,185	$7,135,332
8 April 2024	Cologne	Germany	Lanxess Arena	Deeper	50,185 / 50,185	$7,135,332
Total					2,678,521	$300,016,336

== Cancelled shows ==
List of dates, city, country, venue and reason of cancellation
Date	City	Country	Venue	Reason
8 August 2023	Helsinki	Finland	Kaisaniemi park	Forecasted severe weather conditions

== Musicians ==
=== Depeche Mode ===
- Dave Gahan – lead vocals
- Martin Gore – guitar, keyboards, lead and backing vocals

=== Additional musicians ===
- Christian Eigner – drums, keyboards
- Peter Gordeno – keyboards, bass, backing vocals
