= Depeche Mode: M =

2025 film directed by Fernando Frías

- Theatrical release poster
- Directed by: Fernando Frías de la Parra
- Produced by: Saul Levitz, Stacy Perskie, Nina Soriano
- Starring: Depeche Mode
- Narrated by: Daniel Giménez Cacho
- Cinematography: Damián García
- Production companies: Sony Music Vision; Columbia Records; Anonymous Content; Redrum
- Distributed by: Trafalgar Releasing
- Release dates: 5 June 2025 (Tribeca); 28 October 2025 (United Kingdom); 28 October 2025 (United States)
- Running time: 100 minutes
- Countries: United States; Mexico
- Languages: Spanish; English
- Box office: $2.1 million

Depeche Mode: M. A Film by Fernando Frías is a 2025 concert documentary film directed by Mexican filmmaker Fernando Frías de la Parra. The film chronicles English electronic music band Depeche Mode's 2023 performances at Foro Sol in Mexico City during their Memento Mori World Tour. It blends concert footage with archival materials and cultural interstitials to explore themes of music, mortality, and Mexican traditions surrounding death. It was released in the United Kingdom and the United States on 28 October 2025. A DVD and Blu-ray release featuring the film and the full concert footage titled Memento Mori: Mexico City was released on 5 December 2025.

== Background ==
The film documents three sold-out shows held at Foro Sol stadium in September 2023, attended by nearly 200,000 fans. The concerts were part of Depeche Mode's tour in support of Memento Mori, their fifteenth studio album and the first following the death of founding member Andy Fletcher in 2022.

The performances were selected for the film in part due to Mexico's cultural relationship with death, which mirrors the themes of the album. According to the filmmakers, Depeche Mode: M serves as "a window into the band's timeless global influence, and a powerful tribute to the unbreakable connection between music, tradition, and the human spirit".

== Cast ==
- Depeche Mode
  - Dave Gahan
  - Martin Gore

== Production ==
The film was directed by Fernando Frías de la Parra, known for I'm No Longer Here and I Don't Expect Anyone to Believe Me. The cinematography was led by Damián García, with editing by Yibrán Asuad, Melisa San Vincente, and Liora Spilk. Producers included Stacy Perskie Kaniss, Nina Soriano, and Saul Levitz.

== Release ==
Depeche Mode: M premiered on 5 June 2025 at the Tribeca Film Festival as part of the Spotlight+ section. The screening was followed by a live conversation with band members Dave Gahan and Martin Gore and director Frías.

The film was theatrically released on 28 October 2025. It was released on Netflix in the US in January 2026.

== Reception ==
The film has been described by Rolling Stone as a "powerful tribute" to Depeche Mode's legacy and connection with their fanbase. Billboard highlighted its thematic focus on death and culture, calling it a "dynamic cinematic journey".

== Track listing ==
Memento Mori: Mexico City

Live album by Depeche Mode
- Released: 5 December 2025
- Recorded: Live tracks: 21, 23, and 25 September 2023, Mexico City (Mexico); The unreleased songs from the Memento Mori sessions: 2022, Electric Ladyboy, Santa Barbara (California)
- Genres: Synth-pop; alternative rock
- Label: Columbia
- Producer: James Ford (songs from the Memento Mori sessions)

Depeche Mode chronology
Memento Mori (2023)	Memento Mori: Mexico City (2025)

Singles from Memento Mori: Mexico City
- 1. "In the End" Released: 24 October 2025; 2. "Ghosts Again (live in Mexico City)" Released: 14 November 2025; 3. "Survive" Released: 19 December 2025

Memento Mori: Mexico City – DVD, Blu-ray and CD
No.	Title	Original release	Length
1.	"Intro"	N/A
2.	"My Cosmos Is Mine"	Memento Mori
3.	"Wagging Tongue"	Memento Mori
4.	"Walking in My Shoes"	Songs of Faith and Devotion
5.	"It's No Good"	Ultra
6.	"Sister of Night"	Ultra
7.	"In Your Room"	Songs of Faith and Devotion
8.	"Everything Counts"	Construction Time Again
9.	"Precious"	Playing the Angel
10.	"Speak to Me"	Memento Mori
11.	"Home"	Ultra
12.	"Soul with Me"	Memento Mori
13.	"Ghosts Again"	Memento Mori
14.	"I Feel You"	Songs of Faith and Devotion
15.	"A Pain That I'm Used To"	Playing the Angel
16.	"World in My Eyes"	Violator
17.	"Wrong"	Sounds of the Universe
18.	"Stripped"	Black Celebration
19.	"John the Revelator"	Playing the Angel
20.	"Enjoy the Silence"	Violator
21.	"Waiting for the Night"	Violator
22.	"Just Can't Get Enough"	Speak & Spell
23.	"Never Let Me Down Again"	Music for the Masses
24.	"Personal Jesus"	Violator

Memento Mori sessions – CD bonus tracks (previously unreleased)
No.	Title	Songwriters	Length
25.	"Survive"	Martin L. Gore; Dave Gahan
26.	"Life 2.0"	Gore
27.	"Give Yourself to Me"	Gore; Richard Butler
28.	"In the End"	Gore; Butler

=== Musicians ===
Depeche Mode

- Dave Gahan – lead vocals
- Martin Gore – guitars, synthesizers, backing vocals; lead vocals ("Home", "Soul with Me"); vocoder ("Life 2.0"); co-lead vocals ("Everything Counts", "Never Let Me Down Again")

Other musicians

- Peter Gordeno – synthesizers, backing vocals; bass ("My Cosmos Is Mine", "A Pain That I'm Used To")
- Christian Eigner – drums (except "Waiting for the Night" and "Soul with Me"); synthesizers ("Waiting for the Night")
- James Ford – additional synthesizers, keyboards, and programming (unreleased tracks); drums and percussion ("Life 2.0", "Give Yourself to Me"), pedal steel guitar ("Give Yourself to Me")
- Marta Salogni – additional programming, tape loop (unreleased tracks)

=== Charts ===
Chart performance for Memento Mori: Mexico City
Chart (2025–2026)	Peak position
Austrian Albums (Ö3 Austria)	1
Belgian Albums (Ultratop Flanders)	12
Belgian Albums (Ultratop Wallonia)	1
Czech Albums (ČNS IFPI)	37
Danish Albums (Hitlisten)	12
Dutch Albums (Album Top 100)	26
French Albums (SNEP)	9
German Albums (Offizielle Top 100)	1
German Rock & Metal Albums (Offizielle Top 100)	1
Greek Albums (IFPI)	48
Hungarian Albums (MAHASZ)	2
Irish Albums (Official Charts)	43
Italian Albums (FIMI)	6
Norwegian Physical Albums (IFPI Norge)	10
Polish Albums (ZPAV)	2
Portuguese Albums (AFP)	62
Scottish Albums (Official Charts)	8
Spanish Albums (Promusicae)	18
Swedish Albums (Sverigetopplistan)	10
Swiss Albums (Schweizer Hitparade)	2
UK Albums (Official Charts)	22
US Soundtrack Albums (Billboard)	9
US Top Album Sales (Billboard)	24
US Top Dance Albums (Billboard)	7
