= In the End (Depeche Mode song) =

2025 single by Depeche Mode

Single by Depeche Mode

from the album Memento Mori: Mexico City
- Released: 24 October 2025
- Recorded: 2022
- Genre: Synth-pop
- Length: 3:23
- Label: Columbia
- Songwriters: Martin L. Gore; Richard Butler
- Producer: James Ford

Depeche Mode singles chronology
"People Are Good" (2024)	"In the End" (2025)	"Ghosts Again (Live in Mexico City)" (2025)

Music video
- "In the End" on YouTube

"In the End" is a song by English electronic music band Depeche Mode, released on 24 October 2025 as the first digital single from their eighth live album Memento Mori: Mexico City, which was released on 5 December 2025.

== Background ==
"In the End" was written by Martin L. Gore and Richard Butler. The song was recorded during sessions for Depeche Mode's 2023 studio album Memento Mori, and is one of the four bonus tracks not included on the original album; the others are "Survive", "Life 2.0", and "Give Yourself to Me". "In the End" is also featured in the band's concert documentary film Depeche Mode: M, released on 5 December 2025.

== Reception ==
Tom Breihan of Stereogum described "In the End" as "a throbbing goth-pop meditation on the temporary nature of live [sic]." Bill Pearis of BrooklynVegan stated: "A rumination of mortality, 'In the End' is a pretty terrific Depeche Mode song, all midtempo mood as they sing 'We're weightless / Floating endlessly / We'll be dust again / In the end' over layers and layers of very cool-sounding synths."

== Track listing ==
Digital download
No.	Title	Writer(s)	Length
1.	"In the End" (from the Memento Mori sessions)	Martin L. Gore; Richard Butler	3:23

== Charts ==
Chart performance
Chart (2025)	Peak position
Uruguay Anglo Airplay (Monitor Latino)	10
