= People Are Good =

2024 single by Depeche Mode

Single by Depeche Mode

from the album Memento Mori
- Released: 5 April 2024
- Recorded: 2022
- Length: 4:24
- Label: Columbia
- Songwriter: Martin L. Gore
- Producer: James Ford

Depeche Mode singles chronology
"Before We Drown" (2024)	"People Are Good" (2024)	"In the End" (2025)

Music video
- "People Are Good" on YouTube

"People Are Good" is a song by English electronic music band Depeche Mode, released on 5 April 2024 as the seventh and final single from their fifteenth studio album, Memento Mori (2023).

== Background ==
"People Are Good" is a song reminiscent of the industrial sound of Depeche Mode's early years, without being overly insistent of this trend, and is actually closer to dark wave—with lyrics about the ideal people and how they really are. The band also released a special collection of five remixes of the song.

== Music video ==
The official video for "People Are Good" was released just five days before the conclusion of the Memento Mori World Tour. The video was directed by Rich Hall and with artistic direction by Anton Corbijn. Filmed completely in black and white, the video shows images of people being seemingly violent until it is shown they are actually doing good deeds (saving life, dancing etc.), capturing the seedier side of society.

== Reception ==
Grayson Haver Currin of Pitchfork stated, "'People Are Good' and 'Never Let Me Go' not only share the first half of their titles with two of Depeche Mode's most titanic hits but also their anthemic ambitions. Ebullient, danceable, and deeply disappointed, 'People Are Good' is the confession of a recovering pessimist realizing maybe he was right, that our very nature ensures our doom." Kory Grow of Rolling Stone commented, "on 'People Are Good'—a Gore composition which feels like the long lost coda for 'People Are People'—Gahan reminds himself that despite all the ills of the world, people are supposed to be good. The music, which builds layer upon layer, recalls the group's mid-Eighties sound of Black Celebration and Music for the Masses; 'Everything will be all right in time' they offer, before returning to the original message: “Keep fooling yourself that people are good'."

Ian Wade of The Quietus added, "Loss is never far from the lyrics. On the Gore/Gahan co-write 'Wagging Tongue', which opens with the melodic bounce of Trans-Europe Express-era Kraftwerk before plunging into fluttering murk. The line 'Everything seems hollow when you watch another angel die' seems heartfelt. Tickles of Computer World pop up on 'People Are Good', with a tease where it feels like it's about to go into that title track's riff. Lyrically the song itself is a jaded update of the frustrated optimism of 'People Are People', where rather than frustratedly wonder why we get along so awfully, Gahan has to 'keep reminding myself that people are good' and 'keep fooling myself that everyone cares', which is a mantra we can all relate to when faced with daily shithousery."

== Track listing ==
Digital download (Remixes)
No.	Title	Length
1.	"People Are Good" (AC Fool Mix)	6:55
2.	"People Are Good" (Ludwig A.F. Heaven Help Us Mix)	3:43
3.	"People Are Good" (Depeche Mode v SiGNL: The Good People's Mix)	6:58
4.	"People Are Good" (Obskür Remix)	4:13
5.	"People Are Good" (Indira Paganotto Twilight Remix)	8:57
Total length:		29:26

Limited 12″
No.	Title	Length
1.	"Before We Drown" (Chris Avantgarde Extended Remix)	5:02
2.	"Before We Drown" (AC Wet Mix)	5:03
3.	"People Are Good" (Indira Paganotto Psy Remix)	9:36
4.	"People Are Good" (AC Fool Mix)	6:55

== Charts ==
Chart performance for "People Are Good"
Chart (2024)	Peak position
UK Singles Sales (OCC)	52
