= Survive (Depeche Mode song) =

2025 single by Depeche Mode

Single by Depeche Mode

from the album Memento Mori: Mexico City
- Released: 19 December 2025
- Recorded: 2022
- Studio: Electric Ladyboy, Santa Barbara
- Genre: Synth-pop, soft rock
- Length: 4:18
- Label: Columbia
- Songwriters: Martin L. Gore; David Gahan
- Producer: James Ford

Depeche Mode singles chronology
"Ghosts Again (Live in Mexico City)" (2025)	"Survive" (2025)

Music video
- Depeche Mode - Survive (from the Memento Mori Sessions - Official Audio) on YouTube

"Survive" is a song by English electronic music band Depeche Mode, released on 19 December 2025 as the second single from their eighth live album, Memento Mori: Mexico City.

== Background ==
"Survive" was written by Martin L. Gore and Dave Gahan, and produced by James Ford. The song was recorded during sessions for Depeche Mode's 2023 studio album Memento Mori, and is one of the four bonus tracks not included on the original album; the others are "In the End", "Life 2.0", and "Give Yourself to Me".

== Track listing ==
Digital download
No.	Title	Writer(s)	Length
1.	"Survive" (from the Memento Mori sessions)	Martin L. Gore; Dave Gahan	4:18
