= Deeper (band) =

Indie rock band

- Origin: Chicago, Illinois, U.S.
- Genres: Indie rock; post-punk
- Years active: 2014–present
- Labels: Fire Talk; Sub Pop
- Members: Nic Gohl; Drew McBride; Shiraz Bhatti; Kevin Fairbairn
- Past members: Michael Clawson
- Website: www.deeperchi.com

Deeper is an American indie rock/post punk band from Chicago consisting of Nic Gohl (guitar, vocals), Drew McBride (guitar, bass, synthesizer), Shiraz Bhatti (drums), and Kevin Fairbairn (bass).

== History ==
=== Formation and early career ===
Deeper was initially formed as a dream pop band in 2014. Singer and guitarist Nic Gohl started the band with singer Caroline Campbell, drummer Shiraz Bhatti, bassist Ben Taylor, and eventually recruited childhood friend Michael Clawson on guitar. The band was an active part of the Chicago DIY music scene, eventually releasing a pair of demos on producer/engineer Dave Vettraino's imprint Public House Sound Recordings in June 2014. In early 2015, the band began recording a full length record at Treehouse Records, but after being dissatisfied with the recordings decided to pursue a different direction sonically. Campbell and Taylor left the band shortly thereafter to focus on other musical projects.

At the end of 2015, guitarist and bassist Drew McBride joined the band on bass after the dissolution of local dream pop band Landmarks. With the lineup finalized, Deeper scrapped all previous material and began developing a more aggressive sound, eventually self-released "Transmogrified" in June 2016. The release caught the attention of burgeoning indie label Fire Talk Records who signed the band and re-released the track. The band spent the remainder of 2016 and 2017 writing and playing shows locally with the likes of Chris Cohen, Protomartyr, and embarking on regional tours.

=== Deeper ===
On May 18, 2018, the band released their self-titled debut which the Chicago Tribune called, "a record that's cool without trying too hard, a rarity in 2018" and Pitchfork called "well-oiled and worn-in indie rock, played with the precision and confidence typically expected from a band much further along in its career." In September, the band opened for Melbourne, Australia band Rolling Blackouts Coastal Fever on a tour from Chicago to Washington, DC.

In January 2019, the band was in the middle of writing their second record and went on their first full US tour, opening for the Districts. In February, the band went into the studio to begin tracking what would become their second record. They performed at South by Southwest in March and, upon returning, Clawson left the band. Gohl, Bhatti, and McBride continued writing, eventually finishing their second record, Auto-Pain.

In June, McBride moved to guitar and the band added former Clearance guitarist Kevin Fairbairn on bass. Deeper went on tour with Dehd in August and September 2019. They went on their first European tour in October 2019. Following the conclusion of the tour, the band received news that Clawson died by suicide.

=== Auto-Pain ===
On January 27, 2020, Deeper announced their sophomore record, Auto-Pain and released the first single "This Heat". In February, they toured Europe again supporting fellow Chicagoans Twin Peaks in Europe and the United Kingdom. In early March, they began a tour with Corridor in March 2020, which was cancelled midway due to the COVID-19 pandemic. The band released Auto-Pain on March 27, 2020. Paste said the record "does ultimately push their spring-loaded sound even further, adding buoyant synths into the mix and even stickier riffs than before, but more than that, it depicts shades of despair that aren’t always easy to articulate."

In January 2021, the band performed a special live version of Auto-Pain at the Chicago Cultural Center, which was released on the one-year anniversary of the record, and coincided with the announcement of Auto-Pain (Deluxe). On September, 3rd 2021, Auto-Pain (Deluxe) was released. Deeper did a regional tour in the United States with Finom in support of it, followed by a European tour.

In March and April 2022, the band supported the Spirit of the Beehive. In August, the band performed as part of the festival Pickathon.

=== Careful! ===
On April 7, 2023, Deeper announced they signed to Sub Pop and released the track "Sub", which NPR noted is "Deeper settling into its most polished sound yet, one that's finally ready for the indie-rock big leagues." On June 7, the band announced their third record, Careful! and released the single "Build a Bridge". They also announced a US and European tour in support of it. The band played Pitchfork Music Festival on July 22, which the Chicago Sun-Times called "an unforgettable triumph"

Their record Careful! was released on September 8. Pitchfork said of the record, "nearly every song sounds like a long-lost gem from post-punk’s 1980s heyday, with subtle updates from four subsequent decades of indie music."

Deeper embarked on a US tour supporting Careful! in September 2023. Reviewing the Seattle show, The Stranger noted "Gohl and Drew McBride's galvanizing guitar interplay and a rhythm section—drummer Shiraz Bhatti and bassist Kevin Fairbairn—that knows how to optimize the dynamics of excitement."

On October 31, NME announced that Deeper will be supporting Depeche Mode on the European leg of the Memento Mori World Tour. The band was featured at seven shows in Turin, Budapest, Milan, and Cologne in March and April 2024.

In August 2024, the band toured Europe and played notable festivals Paredes de Coura, Canela Party, and La Route du Rock, as well as shows in Portugal, France, Spain, Romania, Italy, the Netherlands, Denmark, Sweden, Germany, and Belgium.

== Discography ==
Title	Notes
Deeper	Released: May 18, 2018; Label: Fire Talk
Run 7"	Released: October 2, 2019; Label: Fire Talk
Auto-Pain	Released: March 27, 2020; Label: Fire Talk
Auto-Pain (Deluxe)	Released: September 3, 2021; Label: Fire Talk
Careful!	Released: September 8, 2023; Label: Sub Pop
