= Before We Drown =

2024 single by Depeche Mode

Single by Depeche Mode

from the album Memento Mori
- Released: 9 February 2024
- Recorded: 2022
- Length: 4:08
- Label: Columbia
- Songwriters: Dave Gahan; Peter Gordeno; Christian Eigner
- Producer: James Ford

Depeche Mode singles chronology
"My Favourite Stranger" (2023)	"Before We Drown" (2024)	"People Are Good" (2024)

Music video
- "Before We Drown" on YouTube

"Before We Drown" is a song by English electronic music band Depeche Mode, released on 9 February 2024 as the sixth single from their fifteenth studio album, Memento Mori (2023).

== Background ==
"Before We Drown" is the eighth track of the Memento Mori album. It was written by lead singer Dave Gahan in collaboration with the band's historic session players Peter Gordeno and Christian Eigner. On 27 January 2024, two days before its official video's release, the song made its live debut at the O2 Arena in London.

== Music video ==
On 29 January 2024, an official music video was released for the song directed by Anton Corbijn. Focusing on themes of mortality and salvation, and filmed in black and white, the video shows a gloomy figure in an overcoat who slowly walks into a dangerous sea, and, in the end, the elements consume him. For the Memento Mori album, Corbijn also directed videos for "Wagging Tongue", "Ghosts Again" and "My Favourite Stranger".

== Reception ==
Kory Grow of Rolling Stone stated, "'Before We Drown', cowritten by Gahan, drummer Christian Eigner and multi-instrumentalist Peter Gordeno (members of Depeche Mode's touring lineup), builds tension minute after minute, as Gahan sings, 'First we stand up, then we fall down/We have to move forward, before we drown'. Synths effervesce eerily like fireworks around his voice as he sings the final words." A reviewer by WECB commented, "The lyrics of the song, deep and evocative, immerse us in a reflection on distance and the need to move forward, the aesthetics of the video go hand in hand and they make a brilliant combo. The chorus, powerful and resonant, tells us about getting up and moving forward before succumbing to the waves of destiny." Ian Wade of The Quietus wrote, "'Before We Drown', Gahan's co-write with touring Moders Peter Gordeno and Christian Eigner, feels so imbued with Depeche Mode-ness that it's almost an AI interpretation of Depeche Mode."

== Track listing ==
Digital download (Remixes)
No.	Title	Length
1.	"Before We Drown" (AC Wet Mix)	5:03
2.	"Before We Drown" (SiGNL Remix)	7:04
3.	"Before We Drown" (Innellea Remix)	5:55
4.	"Before We Drown" (Chris Avantgarde Remix)	3:51
Total length:		21:13

Limited 12″
No.	Title	Length
1.	"Before We Drown" (Chris Avantgarde Extended Remix)	5:02
2.	"Before We Drown" (AC Wet Mix)	5:03
3.	"People Are Good" (Indira Paganotto Psy Remix)	9:36
4.	"People Are Good" (AC Fool Mix)	6:55

== Charts ==
Chart performance for "Before We Drown"
Chart (2024)	Peak position
UK Singles Sales (OCC)	16
