= Depeche Mode by Anton Corbijn =

2020 photography book by Anton Corbijn

- Author: Anton Corbijn
- Language: English
- Genre: Photography book
- Published: 2020; 2021
- Publisher: Taschen
- Publication place: Germany
- Pages: 512

Depeche Mode by Anton Corbijn is a photography book by Dutch photographer Anton Corbijn, first published in a limited edition, in 2020, and in a general release, in 2021. The book documents his vast work with British electronic music band Depeche Mode, from 1981 to 2018, with around 500 photographs.

== Content ==
Corbijn first photographed Depeche Mode in 1981, at the beginning of their career, for an NME cover. Corbijn began working more profoundly with the band in 1986 when he became their de facto creative director, which he has been since then. He helped to create a vision and the visuals for the band by directing several of their music videos, later collected in two video collections (Strange and Strange Too), creating their album graphics and set designs, directing documentaries about their live world tours, and extensively documenting their visuals and aesthetics, through the band's career, in hundreds of photographs.

This book documents the entire work that Corbijn has done with Depeche Mode, from 1981 to 2018, showing photographs of the band in places so diverse as Madrid, Prague, Hamburg, the California desert and Marrakesh, including those taken during the making of some of their most famous videos such as "Enjoy the Silence". Corbijn's photographic work also documents all the band's live tours since 1988.

The book includes Corbijn's sketches and designs for stage sets and album covers. It also includes his handwritten explanatory captions throughout the book as well as an interview with him.
