= Anton Corbijn =

Dutch film director, video director, and photographer (born 1955)

- Corbijn at the 2026 Toronto International Film Festival
- Born: Anton Johannes Gerrit Corbijn van Willenswaard; 20 May 1955 (age 71); Strijen, Netherlands
- Occupations: Photographer; music video director; film director
- Years active: 1975–present
- Website: antoncorbijn.com

Anton Johannes Gerrit Corbijn van Willenswaard (Dutch pronunciation: [ˈɑntɔ ɲoːˈɦɑnəs ˈxɛrɪt kɔrˈbɛiɱ vɑɱ ˌʋɪlənsˈʋaːrt]; born 20 May 1955) is a Dutch photographer, film director, and music video director. He is the creative director behind the visual output of Depeche Mode and U2, having handled the principal promotion and sleeve photography for both bands over three decades. His music videos include Depeche Mode's "Enjoy the Silence" (1990), U2's "One" (version 1) (1991), Bryan Adams' "Do I Have to Say the Words?", Nirvana's "Heart-Shaped Box" (1993), Travis's "Re-Offender" (2003) and Coldplay's "Talk" (2005) and "Viva la Vida" (2008).

He directed the Ian Curtis biographical film Control (2007); The American (2010); A Most Wanted Man (2014), based on John le Carré's 2008 novel of the same name; and Life (2015), based on the friendship between Life magazine photographer Dennis Stock and James Dean.

== Early life ==
Anton Johannes Gerrit Corbijn van Willenswaard was born on 20 May 1955 in Strijen in the Netherlands, where his father had been appointed as parson to the Dutch Reformed Church the previous year. His father, Anton Corbijn van Willenswaard (1917–2007), took up the same position in Hoogland (1966) and Groningen (1972), moving his wife and four children with him. His mother, Marietje Groeneboer (1925–2011), was a nurse and was raised in a parson's family. Photographer and director Maarten Corbijn (born 1960) is a younger brother. Grandfather Anton Johannes (Corbijn) van Willenswaard (1886–1959) was an art teacher at Christian schools in Hilversum and an active member in the local Dutch Reformed Church in Hilversum.

== Career ==
=== Photography ===
Corbijn began his career as a music photographer when he saw the Dutch musician Herman Brood playing in a café in Groningen around 1975. He took a lot of photographs of the band Herman Brood & His Wild Romance and these led to a rise in fame for Brood and in exposure for Corbijn.

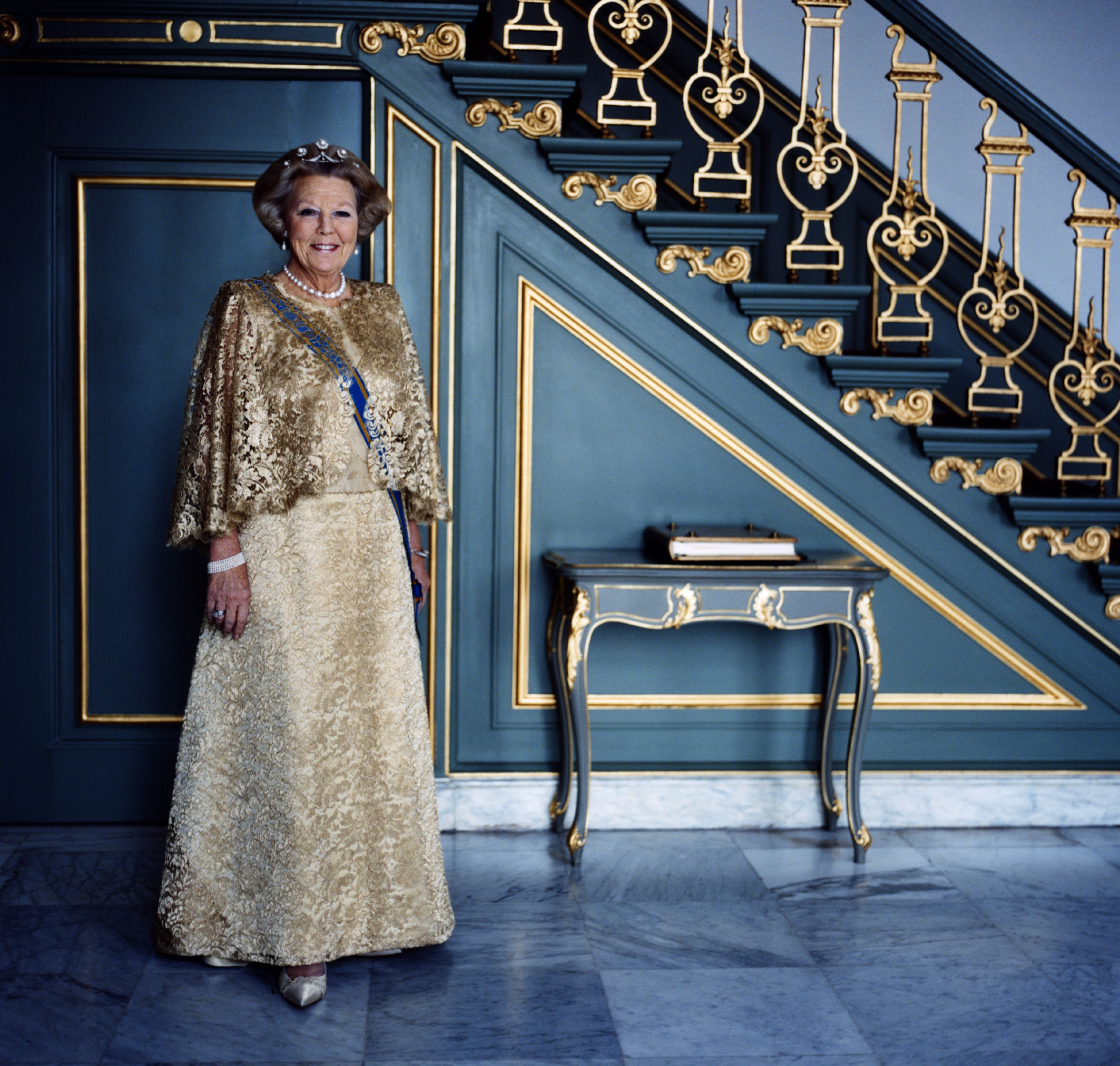
Corbijn's official portrait of Beatrix of the Netherlands in 2008

From the late 1970s the London-based New Musical Express (NME), a weekly music paper, featured his work on a regular basis and would often have a photograph by him on the front page. One such occasion was a portrait of David Bowie wearing a loincloth backstage in New York when starring in The Elephant Man. He took many photos of Joy Division, from early in their career. In the early years of London-based The Face, a glossy monthly post-punk life style / music magazine, Corbijn was a regular contributor. He made his name photographing in black-and-white but in May 1989 he began taking pictures in colour using filters. His first venture in this medium was for Siouxsie Sioux. Between 1998 and 2000, in collaboration with the painter Marlene Dumas, he worked on a project called "Stripping Girls", which took the strip clubs and peep shows of Amsterdam as their subject; while Corbijn later exhibited photographs, Dumas took Polaroids which she then used as sources for her paintings.

Corbijn has photographed Jimmy Page and Robert Plant (formerly of Led Zeppelin), Ai Weiwei, Bob Dylan, Joy Division, Tom Waits, Bruce Springsteen, Prāta Vētra, Peter Hammill, Miles Davis, Kate Bush, Björk, Captain Beefheart, Kim Wilde, Marc Almond, Robert De Niro, Stephen Hawking, Elvis Costello, Siouxsie and the Banshees, Morrissey, Peter Murphy, Simple Minds, Clint Eastwood, The Cramps, Roxette, Herbert Grönemeyer, Annie Lennox, and Eurythmics, amongst others. Perhaps his most famous and longest standing associations are with Depeche Mode and U2. Corbijn's work relationship with Depeche Mode began with the filming of a music video for their 1986 single "A Question of Time". Corbijn says that he soon "started to realise that [his] visuals and their music went really well together. Then [he] did some live photos, and it eventually turned into designing the whole live set. That's what [he's] been doing for them since 1993." Corbijn has directed over 20 of the band's music videos, the most recent of his works being 2024's "Before We Drown". He has also designed most of the covers for Depeche Mode's albums and singles from 1990's Violator album and onwards. Corbijn's work with U2 includes taking pictures of the band on their first US tour, taking pictures for their albums The Joshua Tree and Achtung Baby, and directing a number of accompanying videos.

Other album covers featuring work by Corbijn include those for Springsteen, Nick Cave, Siouxsie Sioux with her second band the Creatures, Bryan Adams, Metallica, Therapy?, The Rolling Stones, Bon Jovi, The Killers, Simple Minds, R.E.M., The Bee Gees, Saybia, Clannad and Moke.

=== Film directing ===
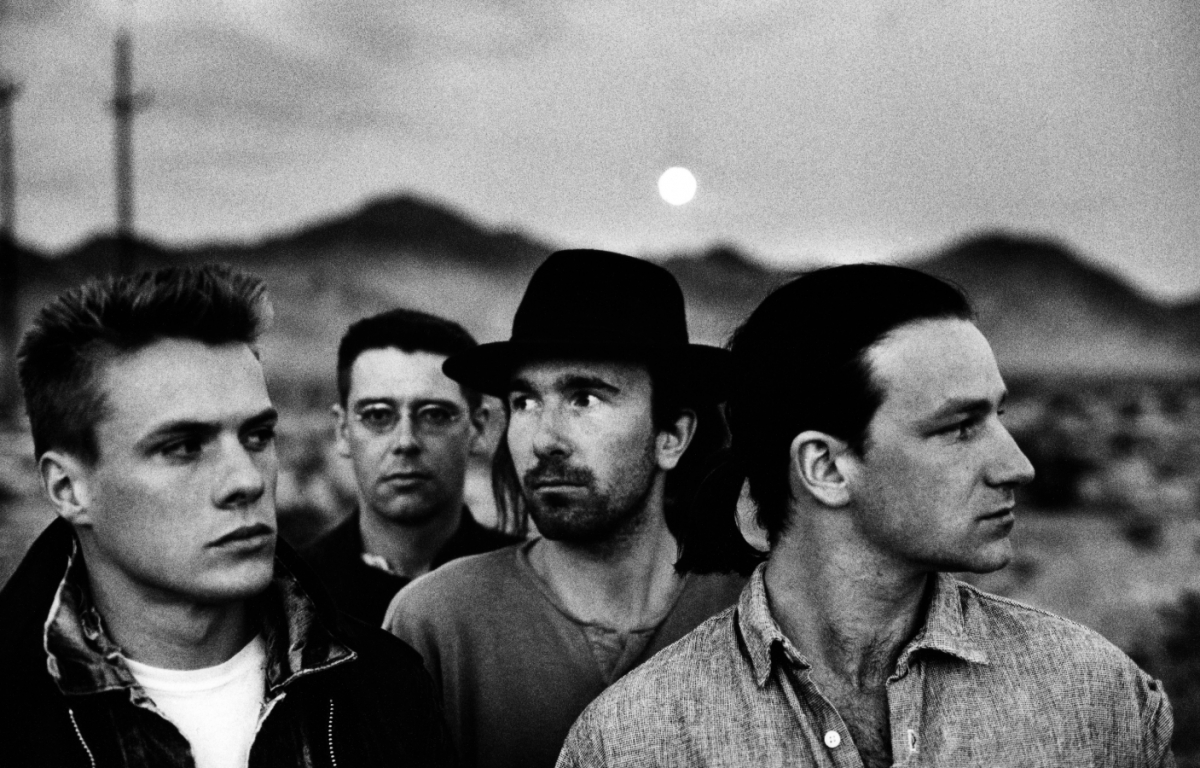
U2 pictured by Corbijn in the Mojave Desert in 1986. Corbijn was closely associated with various rock bands.

Corbijn began his music video directing career when Palais Schaumburg asked him to direct a video. After seeing the resulting video for "Hockey", the band Propaganda had Corbijn direct "Dr. Mabuse". After that he directed videos for David Sylvian, Echo & the Bunnymen, Golden Earring, Front 242, Depeche Mode, Roxette and U2. His first video in colour was made for U2 in 1984 for their single "Pride (In the Name of Love)". In 2005 Palm Pictures released a DVD collection of Corbijn's music video output as part of the Director's Label series.

In 1994 Corbijn directed a short film about Captain Beefheart/Don Van Vliet for the BBC called Some Yoyo Stuff. He made his feature film debut with Control, a film about the life of Joy Division frontman Ian Curtis. It premiered to rave reviews at the Cannes Film Festival on 17 May 2007. The film is based on Deborah Curtis' book Touching from a Distance about her husband and the biography Torn Apart by Lindsay Reade (Tony Wilson's ex-wife) and Mick Middles. Although shown outside the Palme d'Or competition, Control was the big winner of the Director's Fortnight winning the CICAE Art & Essai prize for best film, the "Regards Jeunes" Prize award for best first or second directed feature film and the Europa Cinemas Label prize for best European film in the sidebar. It also received a special mention for the Caméra d'Or prize for best debut feature film. In addition, the film also won the Michael Powell award for best new British feature at the Edinburgh International Film Festival.

In 2010, Corbijn returned as a director with the character-based thriller The American, starring George Clooney.

On 26 October 2011, Corbijn directed a webcast by Coldplay from the Plaza de Toros de Las Ventas in Madrid, Spain.

His film A Most Wanted Man was released in 2014. The John le Carré novel of the same name, which is loosely based on the true war on terror story of Murat Kurnaz, was set in part in Hamburg, as parts of the film were.

In February 2014, he started filming his next project Life about James Dean and photographer Dennis Stock.

On 23 and 25 July 2018, Corbijn filmed the last two concerts of Depeche Mode's Global Spirit Tour at the Waldbühne in Berlin. Some of this footage, intertwined with the stories of six life-long fans in the audience, became the film Spirits in the Forest, which was released in theaters worldwide on 21 November 2019. In Corbijn's interview with NME he spoke about the origins behind the idea of this film and said that they (him and Depeche Mode) "decided to look at the reason for why Depeche Mode was still growing... they're the biggest cult band in the world. It's unbelievable." He further adds that "it's in the DNA of [Depeche Mode] to have these connection to their fans... there's something unusual about it and the fans go to great lengths", which inspired him to make the film in the style that he did.

== Appearances ==
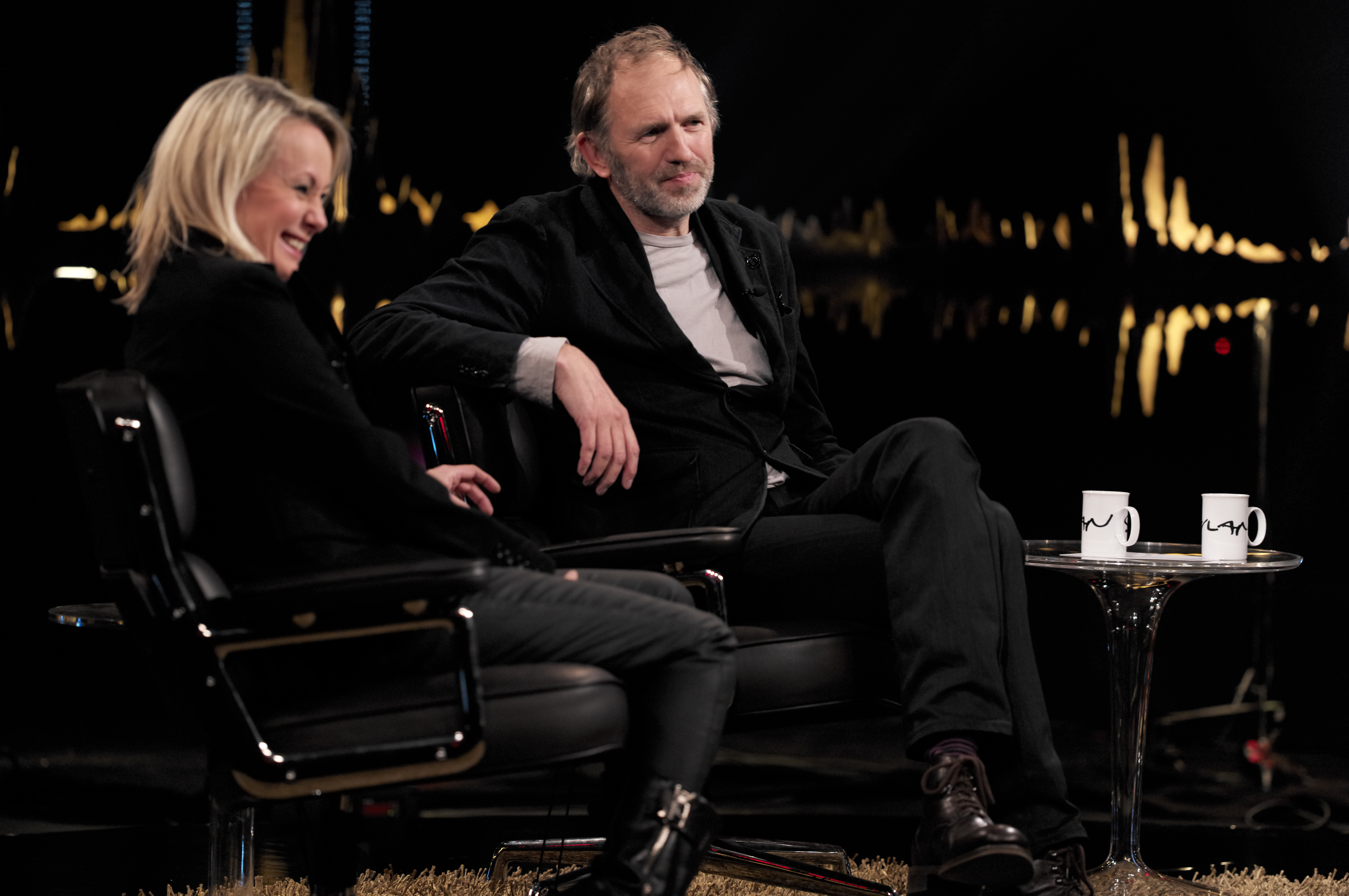
Corbijn with Louise Hoffsten in 2012

Author William Gibson refers to a fictitious portrait by Corbijn of the character Hollis Henry in his 2007 novel Spook Country. A Corbijn photograph has served as the author's portrait on many of Gibson's books, including Neuromancer.

Corbijn is the subject of Josh Whiteman's 2009 documentary film Shadow Play: The Making of Anton Corbijn.

In May 2011, Corbijn presented Mandela Landscape, an artwork consisting of Corbijn's portrait of Nelson Mandela stitched by Dutch textile artist Berend Strik. Both the original work and 80 signed art prints were sold to fund the international edition of ZAM Magazine, an independent platform of African talent.

On 19 December 2011, Corbijn was announced as being on the jury for the 62nd Berlin International Film Festival, held in February 2012. At this occasion, the Berlinale Special screened the documentary Anton Corbijn Inside Out (directed by Klaartje Quirijns) at the Haus der Berliner Festspiele.

== Filmography ==
=== Film ===
| Year | Title | Distributor |
|---|---|---|
| 1993 | Devotional | Mute Records (UK), Sire Records (US) |
| 1994 | Some Yoyo Stuff | BBC |
| 2007 | Control | Momentum Pictures (UK), The Weinstein Company (US) |
| 2009 | Linear | Universal Music Group, U2 |
| 2010 | The American | Focus Features |
| 2014 | A Most Wanted Man | Roadside Attractions |
| 2014 | Live in Berlin | Columbia Records |
| 2015 | Life | Cinedigm |
| 2018 | Hotel Au Provocateur (Short film) | Black Label Productions (GB) |
| 2019 | Spirits in the Forest | Trafalgar Releasing |
| 2023 | Squaring the Circle (The Story of Hipgnosis) | Dogwoof (UK), Utopia (US) |
| 2026 | A Talent for Murder | Bleecker Street, LD Entertainment |

=== Music videos ===
| Year | Song | Artist | Album |
|---|---|---|---|
| 1983 | "Hockey" | Palais Schaumburg | Single |
| 1984 | "Beat Box" | Art of Noise | Who's Afraid of the Art of Noise? |
| 1984 | "Dr. Mabuse" | Propaganda | Single |
| 1984 | "Red Guitar" | David Sylvian | Brilliant Trees |
| 1984 | "The Ink in the Well" | David Sylvian | Brilliant Trees |
| 1984 | "Seven Seas" | Echo & the Bunnymen | Ocean Rain |
| 1984 | "Pride (In the Name of Love)" (third version) | U2 | The Unforgettable Fire |
| 1985 | "Bring on the Dancing Horses" | Echo & the Bunnymen | Single |
| 1986 | "Quiet Eyes" | Golden Earring | The Hole |
| 1986 | "A Question of Time" | Depeche Mode | Black Celebration |
| 1987 | "Bedbugs and Ballyhoo" | Echo & the Bunnymen | Echo & the Bunnymen |
| 1987 | "Lips Like Sugar (first version)" | Echo & the Bunnymen | Echo & the Bunnymen |
| 1987 | "The Game" | Echo & the Bunnymen | Echo & the Bunnymen |
| 1987 | "Strangelove" | Depeche Mode | Music for the Masses |
| 1987 | "Pimpf" | Depeche Mode | Music for the Masses |
| 1987 | "Never Let Me Down Again" | Depeche Mode | Music for the Masses |
| 1987 | "Behind the Wheel" | Depeche Mode | Music for the Masses |
| 1987 | "Blueprint" | Rainbirds | Single |
| 1988 | "Welcome to Paradise" | Front 242 | Front by Front |
| 1988 | "Headhunter" | Front 242 | Front by Front |
| 1988 | "My Secret Place" | Joni Mitchell with Peter Gabriel | Chalk Mark in a Rain Storm |
| 1988 | "Atmosphere" | Joy Division | Single |
| 1989 | "Faith and Healing" | Ian McCulloch | Candleland |
| 1989 | "Sea of Time" | Rainbirds | Call Me Easy, Say I'm Strong, Love Me My Way, It Ain't Wrong |
| 1989 | "White City of Light" | Rainbirds | Call Me Easy, Say I'm Strong, Love Me My Way, It Ain't Wrong |
| 1989 | "Personal Jesus" | Depeche Mode | Violator |
| 1990 | "Killer Wolf" | Danzig | Danzig II: Lucifuge |
| 1990 | "This Is How It Feels" | Inspiral Carpets | Life |
| 1990 | "Enjoy the Silence" (first version) | Depeche Mode | Violator |
| 1990 | "Policy of Truth" | Depeche Mode | Violator |
| 1990 | "World in My Eyes" | Depeche Mode | Violator |
| 1990 | "Clean" | Depeche Mode | Violator |
| 1990 | "Halo" | Depeche Mode | Violator |
| 1991 | "May This Be Your Last Sorrow" | Banderas | Single |
| 1991 | "Marie" | Herbert Grönemeyer | Luxus |
| 1991 | "Two Faces" | Rainbirds | Two Faces |
| 1991 | "Tragedy (For You)" | Front 242 | Single |
| 1992 | "Hail Hail Rock 'n' Roll" | Garland Jeffreys | Don't Call Me Buckwheat |
| 1992 | "Lover Lover Lover" | Ian McCulloch | Mysterio |
| 1992 | "One" (original version) | U2 | Achtung Baby |
| 1992 | "Straight to You" | Nick Cave and the Bad Seeds | Henry's Dream |
| 1992 | "Dirty Black Summer" | Danzig | Danzig III: How the Gods Kill |
| 1992 | "Do I Have to Say the Words?" | Bryan Adams | Waking Up the Neighbours |
| 1993 | "I Feel You" | Depeche Mode | Songs of Faith and Devotion |
| 1993 | "Walking in My Shoes" | Depeche Mode | Songs of Faith and Devotion |
| 1993 | "Condemnation" (first version) | Depeche Mode | Songs of Faith and Devotion |
| 1993 | "Heart-Shaped Box" | Nirvana | In Utero |
| 1994 | "Delia's Gone" | Johnny Cash | American Recordings |
| 1994 | "Mockingbirds" | Grant Lee Buffalo | Mighty Joe Moon |
| 1994 | "In Your Room" | Depeche Mode | Songs of Faith and Devotion |
| 1994 | "Liar" | Rollins Band | Weight |
| 1994 | "Love & Tears" | Naomi Campbell | Baby Woman |
| 1995 | "Have You Ever Really Loved a Woman?" | Bryan Adams | Don Juan DeMarco |
| 1995 | "My Friends" (first version) | Red Hot Chili Peppers | One Hot Minute |
| 1996 | "Hero of the Day" | Metallica | Load |
| 1996 | "Mama Said" | Metallica | Load |
| 1997 | "Barrel of a Gun" | Depeche Mode | Ultra |
| 1997 | "It's No Good" | Depeche Mode | Ultra |
| 1997 | "Useless" | Depeche Mode | Ultra |
| 1997 | "Please" (first version) | U2 | Pop |
| 1998 | "Bleibt Alles Anders" | Herbert Grönemeyer | Bleibt alles anders |
| 1998 | "Fanatisch" | Herbert Grönemeyer | Bleibt alles anders |
| 1998 | "Goddess on a Hiway" (second version) | Mercury Rev | Deserter's Songs |
| 1999 | "Stars" | Roxette | Have a Nice Day |
| 1999 | "Salvation" | Roxette | Have a Nice Day |
| 1999 | "Opus 40" (first version) | Mercury Rev | Deserter's Songs |
| 2000 | "Chemical" (first version) | Joseph Arthur | Come to Where I'm From |
| 2000 | "In the Sun" | Joseph Arthur | Come to Where I'm From |
| 2001 | "Invalid Litter Dept." | At the Drive-In | Relationship of Command |
| 2001 | "Freelove" (second version) | Depeche Mode | Exciter |
| 2002 | "Mensch" | Herbert Grönemeyer | Mensch |
| 2002 | "Electrical Storm" | U2 | Single |
| 2003 | "Re-Offender" | Travis | 12 Memories |
| 2003 | "Zum Meer" | Herbert Grönemeyer | Mensch |
| 2005 | "All These Things That I've Done" (second version) | The Killers | Hot Fuss |
| 2005 | "Talk" | Coldplay | X&Y |
| 2006 | "Suffer Well" | Depeche Mode | Playing the Angel |
| 2007 | "En händig man" | Per Gessle | En händig man |
| 2008 | "Viva la Vida" (second version) | Coldplay | Viva la Vida or Death and All His Friends |
| 2013 | "Should Be Higher" | Depeche Mode | Delta Machine |
| 2013 | "Reflektor" | Arcade Fire | Reflektor |
| 2017 | "Where's the Revolution" | Depeche Mode | Spirit |
| 2017 | "Cover Me" | Depeche Mode | Spirit |
| 2023 | "Ghosts Again" | Depeche Mode | Memento Mori |
| 2023 | "Wagging Tongue" (Creative Director only) | Depeche Mode | Memento Mori |
| 2023 | "My Favourite Stranger" | Depeche Mode | Memento Mori |
| 2024 | "Before We Drown" | Depeche Mode | Memento Mori |
| 2024 | "People Are Good" (Creative Director only) | Depeche Mode | Memento Mori |
| 2026 | "The Greatest Show on Earth" | U2 | Carnaval de Luz |

== Exhibitions ==
- 2005: U2 and i, C/O Berlin
- 2012: Inwards and Onwards, Fotografiska Stockholm
- 2015: Retrospective, C/O Berlin
- 2018: The Living and the Dead, Bucerius Kunst Forum
- 2016: 1-2-3-4, Fotografiska Stockholm
- 2025, Favourite Darkness, Kunstforum Wien
- 2025: Corbijn, Anton, Fotografiska Stockholm
- 2026: Corbijn, Anton, Fotografiska Tallinn
- 2026: Corbijn, Anton, Fotografiska Berlin
- 2026: Photography in Power (group exhibition), Fotografiska Tallinn

== Bibliography ==
- Famouz (1989)
- Strangers (1990)
- Allegro (1991)
- Grönemeyer, Photographien von Anton Corbijn (1993)
- Star Trak (1996)
- 33 Still Lives (1999)
- Stripping Girls (2000, with Marlene Dumas)
- Werk (2000)
- A. Somebody, Strijen, Holland (2002)
- Everybody Hurts (2003)
- U2 & I (2005)
- In Control (2008). Schirmer/Mosel.
- Inside The American (2010). Schirmer/Mosel ISBN 9783829604765.
- Inwards and Onwards. (2011) Schirmer/Mosel ISBN 9783829605588.
- Waits/Corbijn '77–'11. (2013). Schirmer/Mosel Verlag ISBN 9783829605557.
- Looking at A Most Wanted Man (2014). Mosel Verlag ISBN 9783829606493.
- The Making of Miss Dior (2015)
- 1-2-3-4 (2015)
- Hollands Deep (2015)
- MOOD/MODE (2020)
- Depeche Mode by Anton Corbijn (2020, limited edition; 2021)
