= My Favourite Stranger =

2023 single by Depeche Mode

Single by Depeche Mode

from the album Memento Mori
- Released: 20 October 2023
- Recorded: 2022
- Length: 3:55
- Label: Columbia
- Songwriters: Martin L. Gore; Richard Butler
- Producer: James Ford

Depeche Mode singles chronology
"Speak to Me" (HI-LO Remix) (2023)	"My Favourite Stranger" (2023)	"Before We Drown" (2024)

Music videos
- "My Favourite Stranger" on YouTube
- "My Favourite Stranger" (Vinegar Hill Sessions) on YouTube

"My Favourite Stranger" is a song by English electronic music band Depeche Mode, released on 20 October 2023 as the fifth single from their fifteenth studio album, Memento Mori.

== Background ==
"My Favourite Stranger" is one of four tracks on the Memento Mori album written by Martin Gore along with Richard Butler of the Psychedelic Furs. Dave Gahan said that "My Favourite Stranger" is "about having a shadow, someone who follows you around the clock and tells you things. Do you listen to the lie or to the truth? A fun and a little risky song. With music you need to be transported to different places, sometimes it's places that are right in front of your eyes, other times it's open spaces." He also said "this is a direct song, like Suicide's Alan Vega, it has a New York '70s punk vibe."

In his interview for NME Gore explained, "I've never written with anyone outside of the band in our history... Richard reached out to me around April 2020, just texting to say 'We should write some songs together'. I asked for ideas and he sent me a few lines, so I put those to music and we started sending them back and forth. We ended up writing seven songs. We didn't like the first one, but the other six were so great that I thought it would be a bit of a waste to put them out as a side-project. They just wouldn't get the same sort of exposure as they would if they were put out by Depeche."

== Music video ==
On 21 September 2023, an official music video was released for the song directed by Anton Corbijn.

Shot entirely in black and white, the video shows a man wandering through the forest and the streets of a city. Upon arriving to his dwelling, the person turns out to be a woman once the hat and fake mustache are removed.

== Reception ==
Ian Wade of The Quietus wrote: "The electropop turbulence of ‘My Favourite Stranger’ feels as though Butler is identifying the relationship of Gahan and Gore (“puts words in my mouth, all broke and bitter”). Maybe an outside force has helped them identify or at least expand on what winds each other up."

== Track listing ==
Digital download (Remixes)
No.	Title	Length
1.	"My Favourite Stranger" (Boris Brejcha Remix)	7:06
2.	"My Favourite Stranger" (Ela Minus Remix)	3:48
3.	"My Favourite Stranger" (Long Island Sound Remix)	4:46
4.	"My Favourite Stranger" (Sunken Cages Remix)	4:20
5.	"My Favourite Stranger" (Al Wootton Remix)	5:38
Total length:		25:38

Limited 12″
No.	Title	Length
1.	"My Favourite Stranger" (Boris Brejcha Remix)	7:06
2.	"My Favourite Stranger" (Ela Minus Remix)	3:48
3.	"My Favourite Stranger" (Long Island Sound Remix)	4:46

== Charts ==
Chart performance for "My Favourite Stranger"
Chart (2023–2024)	Peak position
UK Singles Sales (OCC)	19
