= Ghosts Again =

2023 single by Depeche Mode

Single by Depeche Mode

from the album Memento Mori
- Released: 9 February 2023
- Recorded: 2022
- Genre: Synth-pop
- Length: 3:58
- Label: Columbia
- Songwriters: Martin L. Gore; Richard Butler
- Producer: James Ford

Depeche Mode singles chronology
"Cover Me" (2017)	"Ghosts Again" (2023)	"My Cosmos Is Mine" (ANNA Remix) (2023)

Music videos
- "Ghosts Again" on YouTube

"Ghosts Again" is a song by English electronic music band Depeche Mode. It was released on 9 February 2023 as the lead single from their fifteenth studio album, Memento Mori.

== Background ==
"Ghosts Again" marks the first single release since the death of co-founder and keyboardist Andy Fletcher in May 2022. To Dave Gahan, the song "captures this perfect balance of melancholy and joy", while Martin Gore added that the song has "such an upbeat feel to it" and how rare it is for the band to record a song that "I just don't get sick of listening to".

== Composition ==
In light of the death of Fletcher, the "reflective, mid-tempo" synth-pop song sees the two members commenting on motifs of death: the fragility of life and the possibility of an afterlife. Throughout the song, the duo keeps reminding the listener that every life will eventually turn into "ghosts again". However, it also gives the idea of being reunited with one another in some form, possibly as "ghosts".

Richard Butler of the Psychedelic Furs is co-credited with lyrics and composition alongside Martin Gore.

== Chart performance ==
"Ghosts Again" has gained both commercial and critical acclaim. In the United States, the song reached number 9 on the Billboard Alternative Airplay chart. It was Depeche Mode's first top ten single on that chart since "It's No Good" in 1997. The song's appearance on the chart made Depeche Mode one of the few acts to have charted at least one song on Alternative Airplay in every decade since its launch in 1988.

== Live release ==
"Ghosts Again" (live in Mexico City)

Single by Depeche Mode

from the album Memento Mori: Mexico City
- Released: 14 November 2025
- Recorded: 23 September 2023
- Venue: Foro Sol Stadium (Mexico City)
- Genre: Synth-pop
- Length: 4:04 (full version); 3:59 (video edit)
- Label: Mute
- Songwriters: Martin L. Gore; Richard Butler
- Producer: James Ford

Depeche Mode singles chronology
"In the End" (2025)	"Ghosts Again" (live in Mexico City) (2025)	"Survive" (2025)

Music video
- "Ghosts Again" (live in Mexico City) on YouTube

A live version of "Ghosts Again" from Depeche Mode's Memento Mori World Tour was released as a single in November 2025 to promote the live album Memento Mori: Mexico City.

== Critical reception ==
Atwood Magazine praised the song, saying, "The aching stark beauty of the song and video is one to be unfurled within your own existence in pondering the spheres of life and death while seizing the fleeting time that life offers us. In this new single, we witness Depeche Mode writing and creating music that continues to set them into their own stratosphere of music that is like no other—an unparalleled band that always enables us to consider our own existence with greater forms of clarity and insight on the joy and melancholy of the human condition. 'Ghosts Again' is a sublime reveal by Depeche Mode, with Gore and Gahan aspiring to new heights of their creative powers in creating a song of perfection for the ages."

Music magazine Clash was positive on the composition stating, "Taken from the LP, new song 'Ghosts Again' pivots between light and shade, the imposing crunch of the electronics lit up by some distant form of hope. Expertly done, it finds Depeche Mode drawing on their decades of experiences, while also embracing new ideas... Challenging and emotive, it's also a pop song, with the English legends refusing to stray too far from their roots."

Damien Morris of The Guardian praised the song, saying "Gore's say-what-you-see lyrics are always best on the essentials of life—sex and death—and 'Ghosts Again' is the pair's best single in aeons, a singalong meditation on mortality that's concise and powerful."

== Music video ==
The music video for "Ghosts Again" was filmed in New York City and released on 9 February 2023. It was directed by longtime visual collaborator Anton Corbijn. The story focuses on Gore and Gahan reenacting the chess game with Death in Ingmar Bergman's The Seventh Seal (1958) on an urban rooftop. It alternates with scenes of the two performing in a cemetery.

== Remixes ==
In May 2023, several remixes of "Ghosts Again" were released, including by Chris Liebing, Luke Slater, Rival Consoles, Matthew Herbert and Davide Rossi.

== Track listing ==
Digital download and 7″
No.	Title	Length
1.	"Ghosts Again"	3:58

German 7″
No.	Title	Length
1.	"Ghosts Again"	3:58
2.	"Never Let Me Down Again"	4:20

Remixes
No.	Title	Length
1.	"Ghosts Again" (Massano Remix)	6:42
2.	"Ghosts Again" (Chris Liebing vs Luke Slater Remix)	8:06
3.	"Ghosts Again" (Miss Grit Remix)	3:51
4.	"Ghosts Again" (Rival Consoles Remix)	3:46
5.	"Ghosts Again" (Matthew Herbert's Feelings Remix)	7:50
6.	"Ghosts Again" (Davide Rossi Strings Remix)	4:00
7.	"Ghosts Again" (Bergsonist's Shadow Mix)	4:08
8.	"Ghosts Again" (Nik Colk Void Remix)	4:35

Limited 12″
No.	Title	Length
1.	"Ghosts Again" (Massano Remix)	6:43
2.	"Ghosts Again" (Chris Liebing vs Luke Slater Remix)	8:06

Digital download (Live in Mexico City)
No.	Title	Length
1.	"Ghosts Again" (Live in Mexico City)	4:04

== Personnel ==
Personnel taken from Sound on Sound.

- Dave Gahan – vocals
- Martin Gore – synthesisers, drum machine, guitar, vocals

== Charts ==
=== Weekly charts ===
Weekly chart performance for "Ghosts Again"
Chart (2023)	Peak position
Belgium (Ultratop 50 Wallonia)	42
Czech Republic Airplay (ČNS IFPI)	63
Germany (GfK)	28
Hungary (Rádiós Top 40)	28
Hungary (Single Top 40)	2
Latvia Airplay (LAIPA)	6
Poland (Polish Airplay Top 100)	22
San Marino (SMRRTV Top 50)	11
Slovakia Airplay (ČNS IFPI)	54
Sweden Heatseeker (Sverigetopplistan)	16
Switzerland (Schweizer Hitparade)	79
UK Singles Sales (OCC)	14
US Adult Alternative Airplay (Billboard)	2
US Alternative Airplay (Billboard)	9
US Hot Dance/Electronic Songs (Billboard)	13
US Rock & Alternative Airplay (Billboard)	9

=== Year-end charts ===
Year-end chart performance for "Ghosts Again"
Chart (2023)	Position
US Hot Dance/Electronic Songs (Billboard)	49
US Rock Airplay (Billboard)	47

== Certifications ==
Certifications for "Ghosts Again"
Region	Certification	Certified units/sales
Hungary (MAHASZ)	Gold	2,000^{‡}
Italy (FIMI)	Gold	50,000^{‡}
Poland (ZPAV)	Gold	25,000^{‡}
^{‡} Sales+streaming figures based on certification alone.
