= Memento Mori (Depeche Mode album) =

2023 album by Depeche Mode

Studio album by Depeche Mode
- Released: 24 March 2023
- Recorded: July–October 2022
- Studios: Electric Ladyboy (Santa Barbara); Shangri-La (Malibu)
- Genres: Synth-pop; electronic rock; dark wave
- Length: 50:24
- Label: Columbia
- Producer: James Ford

Depeche Mode chronology
Live Spirits Soundtrack (2020)	Memento Mori (2023)	Memento Mori: Mexico City (2025)

Singles from Memento Mori
- 1. "Ghosts Again" Released: 9 February 2023; 2. "My Cosmos Is Mine" Released: 9 March 2023; 3. "Wagging Tongue" Released: 7 July 2023; 4. "Speak to Me" Released: 11 August 2023; 5. "My Favourite Stranger" Released: 20 October 2023; 6. "Before We Drown" Released: 9 February 2024; 7. "People Are Good" Released: 5 April 2024

Memento Mori (stylised on cover as Memento| Mori) is the fifteenth studio album by the English electronic music band Depeche Mode, released on 24 March 2023 through Columbia. The album was produced by James Ford, and marks their first album in six years since 2017's Spirit, the longest gap between the band's albums to date.

It was preceded by the single "Ghosts Again" on 9 February and the track "My Cosmos Is Mine" on 9 March (released on streaming platforms) and is the first Depeche Mode studio album to be recorded and released as a duo, after the death of co-founder and keyboardist Andy Fletcher on 26 May 2022. The album was promoted by the Memento Mori World Tour.

== Background ==
Andy Fletcher died suddenly of an aortic dissection on 26 May 2022. Although songwriting and demo work on the album began prior to Fletcher's death, Dave Gahan stated in an interview with NME that Fletcher did not record nor hear any material for the album. In the same interview, Martin Gore also explained how Richard Butler ended up co-writing four songs for the album. In April 2020, Butler reached out to Gore to write songs together. He sent some lyrics, Gore added the music, and they went back and forth.

Gore said the songs were too good to be a side project, and so Depeche Mode put them on the album although Butler was never going to join the band.

"Martin sent me about six songs, and Richard Butler was singing on a few of them," Gahan recalled. "I was like, '...The fuck is this?' Then Martin explained that during COVID he and Richard had written some songs together. I don't care who wrote them, but they were some great songs."

We started work on this project early in the pandemic, and its themes were directly inspired by that time. After Fletch's passing, we decided to continue as we're sure this is what he would have wanted, and that has really given the project an extra level of meaning.

— Martin Gore on the creating process of the album, Live Nation Entertainment

The theme of death within the album came about due to Gore thinking about his own mortality, along with the COVID-19 pandemic, which was killing hundreds of thousands of people throughout the world while he was writing the album.

Though death is a dominant theme in the album, there are some songs which reflect other themes such as "My Cosmos Is Mine" which Gore discussed was written "shortly after Russia invaded Ukraine. I thought, 'How much more are we supposed to endure? What else is expected of us?' And my first reaction was to say: I'm retreating into my own little world, everyone leave me alone. The song is about protecting your inner self in the midst of powerlessness against the storms of the world and wanting to hide somewhere together with your loved one. Which is of course short-sighted, because we have to take responsibility for our earth, otherwise we will all soon no longer be here."

Gahan said that "My Favourite Stranger" is "about having a shadow, someone who follows you around the clock and tells you things. Do you listen to the lie or to the truth? A fun and a little risky song. With music you need to be transported to different places, sometimes it's places that are right in front of your eyes, other times it's open spaces." He also said "this is a direct song, like Suicide's Alan Vega, it has a New York '70s punk vibe."

The album closer, "Speak to Me" which Gahan said wasn't referring to "any of the leaders that we have right now. I'm talking about something that is not a person, but our conscience. I believe that we always know what the right thing to do is, and are given the possibility of choice, but we invariably end up making the wrong choices. Normally, we choose a path that serves our interests best. That's human, of course. But I think in that song I was trying to ask for something by saying: if there is something out there, show me and I will follow. It's me trying to summon something bigger."

=== Recording ===
There were initial doubts that the album would even go through. Gore had debated whether to carry on with the album, saying, "I did question for a second whether it was a good idea to carry on with the schedule we had...because we were due to start in the studio six weeks after [Fletcher] died, and I wondered if we should put that back a little bit. But we decided it was probably best for us to focus on the album, on the music, something we know, something to take our minds off Andy's death." Gahan said that "for a minute" he was convinced that Depeche Mode was over. Gore said that the loss of their bandmate had brought them closer together, saying, "I think that the one thing that's come out of Andy's dying that's possibly, you know, positive.... There's nothing positive about it. But you know, the one good thing is that it's brought me and Dave closer. We have to make decisions as the two of us, so we talk things out, we talk a lot more on the phone, even FaceTime sometimes. That's something we just never did before."

Gore said he never considered changing the title or dropping the song's subject matter on death and mortality following Fletcher's death. "For me, when Andy died it cemented the idea that we had to carry on with these songs and the title. The idea that we should all be making the most of our time on Earth and it's very limited—it's kind of an important message. And it's even more important now Andy's gone."

The Memento Mori sessions were, nonetheless, smooth and productive, unlike the Spirit sessions, which were reportedly filled with a built-up hostility and tense atmosphere. Producer James Ford was initially surprised that the band had even wanted to work with him again, stating "at the end of the process and I was like: 'Ah, that's it, I probably will not work with them again'. So I was really surprised when they asked me the second time, honestly." With regard to the songs and track listing on the final album, Ford said, "There was a period when we had like 20 tracks and we had to get them down to the album—that's always in any process a little bit fraught, especially when it's different people's songs. But Daniel Miller came in the studio around that time too. Obviously he has this relationship with them from the beginning. So it was great to have him in the studio.... We ended up doing this secret ballot of everybody's favourite tracks and that kind of thing. It actually went really smoothly. We did this kind of secret voting thing between the five of us."

Marta Salogni, the mixer of the album, felt that it was "wonderful" to witness Gore and Gahan's flourishing friendship, and the creativity it brought to the album. "With Andy being a filter—after he passed, the filter unfortunately disappeared, and suddenly the curtain dropped and they were there to face each other," she said. "Honesty comes to the forefront, and you just face what you perhaps haven't faced before." She was also pleased to be given a writing credit on the song "Speak to Me". She said, "It was written by Dave, and James and I literally locked ourselves in the studio one day and completely remade his demo, and presented it to him. He loved it, so much that he gave us a writing credit on it. We changed key, changed tempo, and took out all the instruments, and built the arrangement back up from the vocals. James and I used the EMS Synthi A for a lot of this, for example creating the high-pitched drones and the heavy kicks at the end."

== Promotion ==
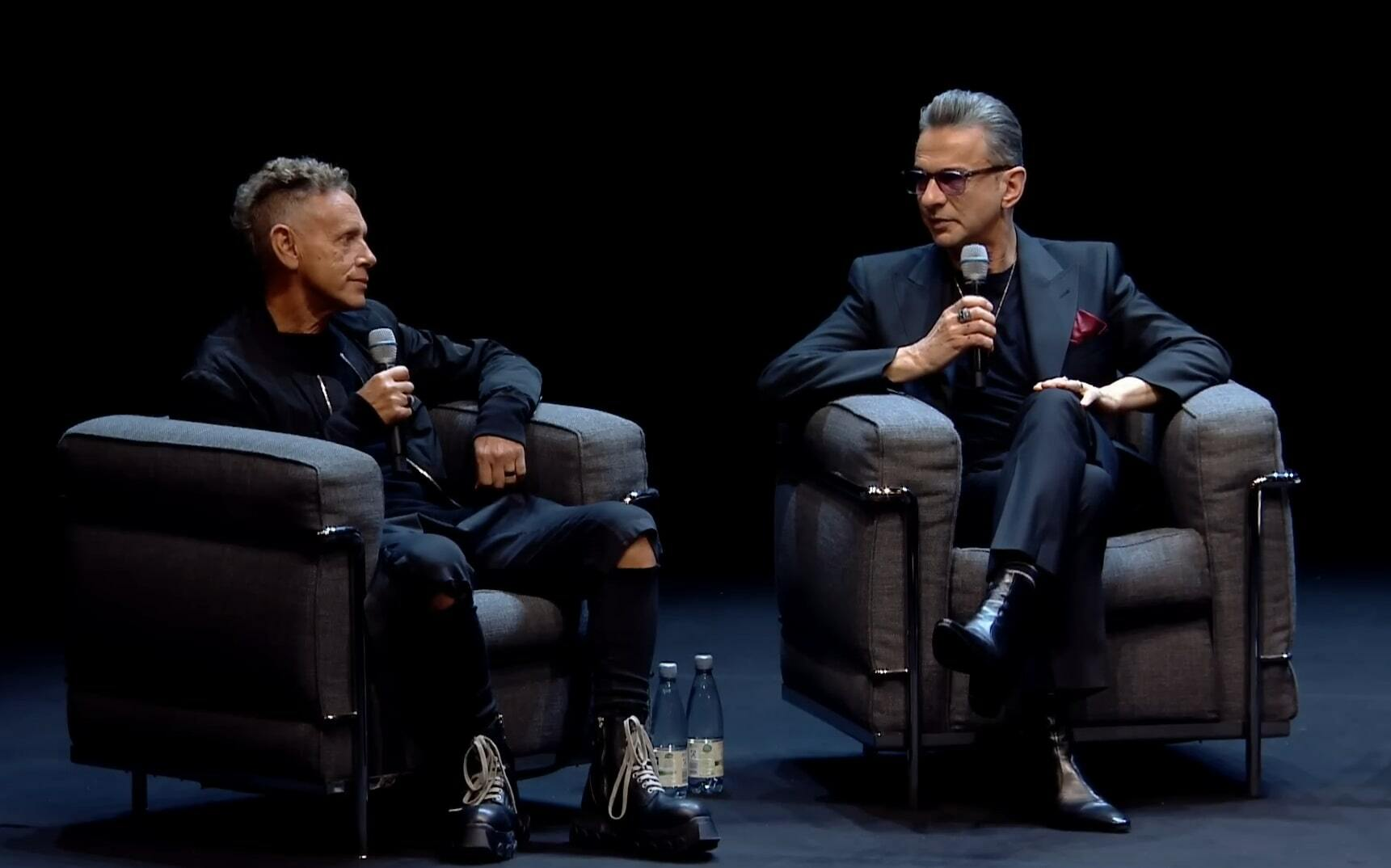
Gore and Gahan discussing the release of the album at the press conference in Berlin

In August 2022, a photo of Gore and Gahan in the studio was shared on social media, indicating they were in the studio working on new material.

On 4 October 2022, the band held a press conference in Berlin, announcing the album title and the world tour.

A description of the album appeared on the band's official website: "The album's 12 tracks chart a vast expansion of moods and textures, from its ominous opening to its closing resolve—running the gamut from paranoia and obsession to catharsis and joy, and hitting myriad points between". The full tracklist of 12 songs was also announced. On Volt Magazin's website, it was confirmed that "Dave Gahan and Martin Gore said there were five finished tracks that didn't make it onto the long player."

On 24 May 2023, the official music video was released for "Wagging Tongue" directed by the Sacred Egg, with Anton Corbijn acting as the creative director.

On 25 May 2023, during the SmartLess Apple Podcast, Gore stated that an unreleased song from the Memento Mori sessions titled "Life 2.0" will be released later in the year.

On 16 June 2023, the ANNA remix of "My Cosmos Is Mine" was released on streaming platforms as the second single from the album.

On 7 July 2023, remixes of "Wagging Tongue" were released on streaming platforms, the song featuring as the third single from the album.

On 11 August 2023, the HI-LO remix of "Speak to Me" was released on streaming platforms as the fourth single from the album.

On 21 September 2023, an official music video was released for the song "My Favourite Stranger" directed by Anton Corbijn with the song later being released on 20 October 2023 as the fifth single from the album.

On 29 January 2024, an official music video was released for "Before We Drown", in which Corbijn "directs a moody seafront visual for the Memento Mori track". The song was later released as the sixth single from the album on 9 February 2024.

On 5 April 2024, an official music video was released for "People Are Good", directed by Rich Hall, with creative direction by Anton Corbijn. The song was released as the seventh single on the same day, coinciding with a 5-track remix EP.

== Live debuts and tour ==
On 11 February 2023, the band debuted "Ghosts Again" live at Sanremo Music Festival, in Italy. Followed in the same month "Wagging Tongue" in La Plaine-Saint-Denis, France (14 February 2023) and "My Favourite Stranger" in Munich, Germany, at a special fan event (19 February 2023).

On 23 March 2023, the eve of the album's release, "My Cosmos Is Mine", "Speak to Me" and "Soul with Me" were performed live for the first time at Golden 1 Center in Sacramento, California. The March 23, 2023 concert which included the performance of these two songs would also mark the start of the Depeche Mode's Memento Mori World Tour, as well as Depeche Mode's first performance in the United States in five years. On 27 January 2024, two days before its official video's release, "Before We Drown" made its live debut at the O_{2} Arena in London. The album's concert tour would consist of 112 shows and concluded on April 8, 2024. On 28 October 2025, Depeche Mode: M, a documentary film chronicling Depeche Mode's three concerts in Mexico City in September 2023 during the Memento Mori Tour, was released in theaters.

== Commercial performance ==
In the UK Memento Mori debuted at No. 2 with 17,867 sales and 15,209 coming from physical format. In the US, the album debuted and peaked at No. 14, selling 32,000 equivalent album units in its opening week, marking the first time since 1987's Music for the Masses that the band failed to break into the Top 10 of the Billboard 200 chart. In France the album debuted at No. 1 with 28,416 equivalent sales and earned a Gold certification one month after its release.

== Critical reception ==
Professional ratings
Aggregate scores
Source	Rating
AnyDecentMusic?	8.1/10
Metacritic	85/100
Review scores
Source	Rating
AllMusic	4.5/5 stars
The Arts Desk	5/5 stars
Clash	8/10
The Guardian	4/5 stars
The Independent	4/5 stars
The Line of Best Fit	9/10
NME	4/5 stars
Pitchfork	7.1/10
Record Collector	4/5 stars
Rolling Stone	4/5 stars

Memento Mori was acclaimed by critics on its release. The album received a score of 85 out of 100 from 19 critics' reviews on review aggregator Metacritic, indicating "universal acclaim". At AnyDecentMusic?, which collects critical reviews from more than 50 media sources, the album scored 8.1 points out of 10, based on 19 professional reviews.

The Guardian gave it four out of five stars, writing "Gore's say-what-you-see lyrics are always best on the essentials of life—sex and death—and 'Ghosts Again' is the pair's best single in aeons, a singalong meditation on mortality that's concise and powerful. Both are in fine voice. Gore's choirboy trills have never been richer than on 'Soul with Me', while Gahan ranges ever-restlessly from operatic to reptilian, the electro-pop Freddie Mercury. There's warmth in the album's fusion of industrial grind with delicate melody, and producer James Ford sparks a revivifying weirdness in songs such as 'My Cosmos Is Mine'. For a record preoccupied by death, its big heart bursts with life."

Kory Grow of Rolling Stone praised the message of the album, stating "Acknowledging mortality defines much of Memento Mori, but it never feels heavy handed or even all that sullen. Some of the tracks even sound upbeat". He concluded, "As always with Depeche Mode, everything counts in large amounts, and on Memento Mori, the stakes feel bigger than ever."

Cristina Jaleru of ABC News was also positive about the album stating "The 12 tracks are fully Depeche, fully intoxicating in sound, artistically evocative and sometimes puzzling (like the compelling but strange 'Caroline's Monkey'). The music is staring lovingly into the abyss and asking it to love it back; death is always hovering on the periphery of the sound, a grunge, industrial, rainy sound also filled with a strange kindness." and concluded. "Depeche Mode might be facing their own mortality but their power as musicians stretches into infinity."

Ultimate Classic Rock praised the album, favouring it to its predecessor Spirit stating "Depeche Mode's previous album, 2017's Spirit, suffered from some ill-fitting turns toward the political. There's little of that in Memento Mori. For the most part, this is classic band territory—moody goth draped in familiar lyrical subjects, now also informed by a world-stopping pandemic", but was critical on some tracks saying "'Don't Say You Love Me' comes off like the result of a ChatGPT quest to write a Depeche Mode song, and 'Caroline's Monkey' unsuccessfully juggles too many sounds and metaphors during its four-plus minutes."

Roisin O'Connor of The Independent observed, "They can't unlearn their decades of experience, so instead they adopt a kind of back-to-basics approach. By avoiding clutter, both in lyrics and in instrumentation, each song feels like inhaling a gulp of cold, crisp air. Seemingly straightforward sentiment turns out to be deceptive. 'People are good', Gahan tries to insist on a track of the same name, only to admit he's fooling himself. Humans are complicated, he and Gore seem to say. Death, by comparison, is relatively simple."

Grayson Haver Currin of Pitchfork praised the album, saying, "This is absolutely Depeche Mode at their best since Ultra, but there's probably nothing here that introduces them to an entirely new audience, unlike Ultra. Still, 'Soul with Me' is the only true miss, less mid-album fermata than full-on slog: a slow dance of shuffling drums, tremolo guitars, and elementary end-rhyme. Its maudlin sense of self-pity runs counter to the unlikely endurance tale that is Memento Mori, an album that almost died with Fletcher in London."

NME ranked the album at number 49 on their list of the 50 best albums of 2023, hailing it as Depeche Mode's "best album this side of the millennium". They described it as a "collection of stadium-sized electro anthems offered catharsis and creative uplift in equal measure".

== Track listing ==
All lead vocals by Dave Gahan, except where noted.

Memento Mori track listing
No.	Title	Writer(s)	Lead vocals	Length
1.	"My Cosmos Is Mine"	Martin L. Gore	Gahan and Gore	5:18
2.	"Wagging Tongue"	Gore; Dave Gahan		3:25
3.	"Ghosts Again"	Gore; Richard Butler		3:58
4.	"Don't Say You Love Me"	Gore; Butler		3:44
5.	"My Favourite Stranger"	Gore; Butler		3:55
6.	"Soul with Me"	Gore	Gore	4:15
7.	"Caroline's Monkey"	Gore; Butler		4:17
8.	"Before We Drown"	Gahan; Peter Gordeno; Christian Eigner		4:08
9.	"People Are Good"	Gore		4:24
10.	"Always You"	Gore		4:19
11.	"Never Let Me Go"	Gore	Gahan and Gore	4:04
12.	"Speak to Me"	Gahan; Eigner; James Ford; Marta Salogni		4:37
Total length:				50:24

== Personnel ==
Depeche Mode

- Dave Gahan
- Martin L. Gore

Additional musicians

- Marta Salogni – additional programming
- James Ford – additional synthesisers, programming, piano, guitar, bass guitar, pedal steel guitar, drums & percussion; additional strings arrangement (4)
- Davide Rossi – violin & cello, string arrangements
- Desiree Hazley – violin
- Luanne Homzy – violin
- Christian Eigner – programming (8, 12)
- Peter Gordeno – programming (8)

Technical

- James Ford – production
- Marta Salogni – mixing, engineering
- Matt Colton – mastering
- Francine Perry – engineering assistance
- Grace Banks – engineer assistance
- Gregg White – engineering assistance (1, 3–6, 8, 10–12)
- Adrian Hierholzer – vocal engineering (3, 4, 11)

Artwork

- Anton Corbijn – cover, all visuals, art direction, design

== Charts ==
=== Weekly charts ===
Weekly chart performance for Memento Mori
Chart (2023)	Peak position
Australian Albums (ARIA)	36
Austrian Albums (Ö3 Austria)	1
Belgian Albums (Ultratop Flanders)	2
Belgian Albums (Ultratop Wallonia)	1
Canadian Albums (Billboard)	8
Croatian International Albums (HDU)	1
Czech Albums (ČNS IFPI)	2
Danish Albums (Hitlisten)	1
Dutch Albums (Album Top 100)	3
Finnish Albums (Suomen virallinen lista)	4
French Albums (SNEP)	1
German Albums (Offizielle Top 100)	1
Greek Albums (IFPI)	2
Hungarian Albums (MAHASZ)	1
Irish Albums (Official Charts)	3
Italian Albums (FIMI)	1
Lithuanian Albums (AGATA)	8
Japanese Digital Albums (Oricon)	28
Japanese Hot Albums (Billboard Japan)	72
New Zealand Albums (RMNZ)	38
Norwegian Albums (VG-lista)	5
Polish Albums (ZPAV)	2
Portuguese Albums (AFP)	3
Scottish Albums (Official Charts)	4
Slovak Albums (ČNS IFPI)	2
Spanish Albums (Promusicae)	2
Swedish Albums (Sverigetopplistan)	1
Swiss Albums (Schweizer Hitparade)	1
UK Albums (Official Charts)	2
US Billboard 200	14
US Top Alternative Albums (Billboard)	3
US Top Rock Albums (Billboard)	2

=== Year-end charts ===
Year-end chart performance for Memento Mori
Chart (2023)	Position
Austrian Albums (Ö3 Austria)	45
Belgian Albums (Ultratop Flanders)	74
Belgian Albums (Ultratop Wallonia)	9
French Albums (SNEP)	41
German Albums (Offizielle Top 100)	2
Hungarian Albums (MAHASZ)	5
Italian Albums (FIMI)	59
Polish Albums (ZPAV)	16
Spanish Albums (PROMUSICAE)	61
Swiss Albums (Schweizer Hitparade)	8

== Certifications ==
Certifications and sales for Memento Mori
Region	Certification	Certified units/sales
France (SNEP)	Gold	50,000^{‡}
Germany (BVMI)	Gold	100,000^{‡}
Hungary (MAHASZ)	Gold	2,000^{‡}
Italy (FIMI)	Gold	25,000^{‡}
Poland (ZPAV)	Platinum	20,000^{‡}
^{‡} Sales+streaming figures based on certification alone.
