= Speak to Me (Depeche Mode song) =

2023 single by Depeche Mode

"Speak to Me" (HI-LO Remix)

Single by Depeche Mode

from the album Memento Mori
- Released: 11 August 2023
- Recorded: 2022
- Length: 4:37 (album version); 3:45 (HI-LO Remix)
- Label: Columbia
- Songwriters: Dave Gahan; Christian Eigner; James Ford; Marta Salogni
- Producer: James Ford

Depeche Mode singles chronology
"Wagging Tongue" (2023)	"Speak to Me" (HI-LO Remix) (2023)	"My Favourite Stranger" (2023)

Licensed audio
- "Speak to Me" on YouTube
- "Speak to Me" (HI-LO Remix) on YouTube

"Speak to Me" is a song by English electronic music band Depeche Mode from their fifteenth studio album, Memento Mori. A remixed version of the song by Dutch disc jockey Oliver Heldens, characterized by a more techno-oriented backing track, was released on 11 August 2023 as the fourth single from the album.

== Background ==
"Speak to Me" is the twelfth and final track of the Memento Mori album. It was composed by lead singer Dave Gahan in collaboration with the band's historic session player Christian Eigner and producers James Ford and Marta Salogni. Gahan explained that "Speak to Me" was the key piece that pushed him to make a new album with Martin Gore, following the death of Andy Fletcher.

Salogni also explained how the song was created in just one day, completely distorting Gahan's initial demo to the point that he wanted to include her and Ford as actual composers.

Gahan struggled with the idea of recording another Depeche Mode album, and commented that the song was partially an imagined conversation he had with a "larger force" about that question. He says, "Because I felt really torn between jumping into making another Depeche Mode record or, as I had been for the last couple of years for the first time in my life, home with friends and family and my animals. And just living a life and really enjoying that."

== Reception ==
Ian Wade of The Quietus wrote, "The whole album summons its own finale with closer 'Speak to Me', which pulses towards discordancy, reminding you that with the flip-side of bittersweetness comes the inevitable ends that we all must face."

Grayson Haver Currin of Pitchfork mentioned, "...closer 'Speak to Me', a gorgeous bit of Gahan-shaped melancholia that begins like some beatific church hymn but exits beneath a barrage of cursed noise. It's a devoted love song hamstrung by self-loathing, Gahan worried he's not good enough for anyone but himself."

== Track listing ==
All tracks are written by Dave Gahan, Christian Eigner, James Ford and Marta Salogni.

Digital download
No.	Title	Length
1.	"Speak to Me" (HI-LO Remix)	3:45

Limited 12″
No.	Title	Length
1.	"My Cosmos Is Mine" (ANNA Remix)	8:01
2.	"Speak to Me" (HI-LO Extended Remix)	5:55
