= My Cosmos Is Mine =

2023 single by Depeche Mode

"My Cosmos Is Mine" (ANNA Remix)

Single by Depeche Mode

from the album Memento Mori
- Released: 16 June 2023
- Recorded: 2022
- Genre: New wave (album version); Electropop (ANNA Remix)
- Length: 5:18 (album version); 8:01 (ANNA Remix)
- Label: Columbia
- Songwriter: Martin L. Gore
- Producer: James Ford

Depeche Mode singles chronology
"Ghosts Again" (2023)	"My Cosmos Is Mine" (ANNA Remix) (2023)	"Wagging Tongue" (2023)

Licensed audio
- "My Cosmos Is Mine" on YouTube
- "My Cosmos Is Mine" (ANNA Remix) on YouTube

"My Cosmos Is Mine" is a song by English electronic music band Depeche Mode from their fifteenth studio album, Memento Mori. The song premiered on 9 March 2023, and a remixed version by ANNA was later released on 16 June 2023 as the second single from the album.

== Background ==
With the original duration of over five minutes, "My Cosmos Is Mine" is the longest song on the album and presents slow and static sounds aimed at recalling the band's classic industrial style, with Dave Gahan's vocals following the bass line.

Martin Gore stated that it was in fact the last track to be written for the album, and stated the meaning of the song in a German interview, "I wrote it shortly after Russia had invaded Ukraine. I thought, 'How much should we still bear? What else will be thrown at us?' And my first reaction was to say: I will pull myself back into my little world, leave me alone. The song is about, when dealing with powerlessness, protecting your inner self from the attacks of the world and to, together with your loved ones, prefer to hide somewhere. Which is of course rather short-sighted, because we have to accept the responsibility of our planet's wellbeing, or else no one will be left anymore."

== Reception ==
Ian Wade of The Quietus wrote, "There are still the foreboding sounds and moments that you would expect with the Modes, such as on the opener 'My Cosmos Is Mine', which sets the scene with ominous scrapes and blasts, sounding like it could have been designed to be the live show opener (if they're late, the line 'Don't question my stage time' will always bring a smirk)." Paul Brannigan of Louder Sound commented, "The darkly atmospheric 'My Cosmos Is Mine' follows on from the release, last month, of the album's first single, 'Ghosts Again'."

Robin Murray of Clash added, "New single 'My Cosmos Is Mine' is an intense offering, the crunching industrial electronics recalling Nine Inch Nails. Dave Gahan has rarely sounded so ominous, his voice detached in zero gravity by the clinical production."

== Track listing ==
All tracks are written by Martin L. Gore.

Digital download
No.	Title	Length
1.	"My Cosmos Is Mine" (ANNA Remix)	8:01

Limited 12″
No.	Title	Length
1.	"My Cosmos Is Mine" (ANNA Remix)	8:01
2.	"Speak to Me" (HI-LO Extended Remix)	5:55
