= Wagging Tongue =

2023 single by Depeche Mode

Single by Depeche Mode

from the album Memento Mori
- Released: 7 July 2023
- Recorded: 2022
- Genre: Synth-pop
- Length: 3:25
- Label: Columbia
- Songwriters: Dave Gahan; Martin L. Gore
- Producer: James Ford

Depeche Mode singles chronology
"My Cosmos Is Mine" (ANNA Remix) (2023)	"Wagging Tongue" (2023)	"Speak to Me" (HI-LO Remix) (2023)

Music videos
- "Wagging Tongue" on YouTube
- "Wagging Tongue" (Vinegar Hill Sessions) on YouTube

"Wagging Tongue" is a song by English electronic music band Depeche Mode. It was released on 7 July 2023 as the third single from their fifteenth studio album, Memento Mori.

== Background ==
"Wagging Tongue" is the fourth Depeche Mode track that Dave Gahan and Martin Gore collaborated on together (along with "Oh Well", "Long Time Lie" and "You Move"), and the first to be released as a single.

Of the song, Gahan stated: "Martin will take one of my songs, for instance, let's say 'Wagging Tongue', which is on this record. I sent my little demo to Martin of me hamfistedly trying to play the guitar, and get the song out and find the chords and all that. And then Martin sends it back with these beautiful Kraftwerk-esque chords and arpeggiated synths and stuff, and I'm like, 'Oh, okay...' But that then takes me to another place, you see, because that changes the perception again."

"It's the first song from both of us that ever made it onto a record. I could sense early on that we really hit the mark with this one." Gore elaborated: "The melody is excellent, and the entire song has something intoxicating. It's positive, it's pop, but it's not too much pop."

== Reception ==
Joe Muggs of The Arts Desk stated, "The opening brace of tracks 'My Cosmos Is Mine' and 'Wagging Tongue' have synth patterns and deliberately simple melodies that hark all the way back to 1981 and DM's first work with Vince Clarke still in the band." Ian Wade of The Quietus added: "Loss is never far from the lyrics. On the Gore/Gahan co-write Wagging Tongue’, which opens with the melodic bounce of Trans-Europe Express-era Kraftwerk before plunging into fluttering murk. The line “Everything seems hollow when you watch another angel die” seems heartfelt."

Kory Grow of Rolling Stone commented, "On 'Wagging Tongue', a rare Gahan–Gore songwriting collaboration, Gahan sings about feeling sadness 'when you watch another angel die' over sparkly New Wave synths that recall the group's earliest work. The lyrics, which Gahan sings ominously, could be a metaphoric indictment of politicians needing to act on gun safety or Gahan could be singing about rising above personal obstacles, but, either way, with the shimmery keyboard backdrop, the words have a way of sticking in your brain."

== Music video ==
The music video was released on 24 May 2023. It was directed by the Sacred Egg, with Anton Corbijn acting as a creative director.

== Remix ==
On 6 July 2023, British indie rock group Wet Leg remixed the song, featuring new, haunting vocals and an ethereal feel. This remix would go on to be nominated for and win the Grammy Award for Best Remixed Recording, Non-Classical at the 66th Annual Grammy Awards.

== Track listing ==
Digital download (Remixes)
No.	Title	Length
1.	"Wagging Tongue" (Remix featuring Kid Moxie)	4:06
2.	"Wagging Tongue" (Wet Leg Remix)	4:38
3.	"Wagging Tongue" (Edu Imbernon & Clemente 'Imbermind' Vision)	5:24
4.	"Wagging Tongue" (Daniel Avery Remix)	4:30
5.	"Wagging Tongue" (Henning Baer Remix)	4:51
6.	"Wagging Tongue" (Hawtin Gaiser Remix)	6:35
7.	"Wagging Tongue" (Gabe Gurnsey Remix)	5:49
8.	"Wagging Tongue" (Decius Remix)	6:28
9.	"Wagging Tongue" (Kiimi's Enjoy the Ride Dub Remix)	5:44

Limited 12″
No.	Title	Length
1.	"Wagging Tongue" (Hawtin Gaiser Remix)	6:36
2.	"Wagging Tongue" (Daniel Avery Remix)	4:30
3.	"Wagging Tongue" (Henning Baer's 808 Remix)	4:51

== Charts ==
Chart performance for "Wagging Tongue"
Chart (2023)	Peak position
Czech Republic (Rádio – Top 100)	54
UK Singles Sales (OCC)	22
