= Recording the Angel =

Live album

Live album series by Depeche Mode
- Released: 2006
- Recorded: 27 April 2006 - 1 August 2006

Depeche Mode chronology
Playing the Angel (2005)	Recording the Angel (2006)	The Best of Depeche Mode Volume 1 (2006)

Recording the Angel was a project by the band Depeche Mode to record the concerts on the final two legs of their 2005–06 concert tour, Touring the Angel. The recording was done by London-based company Live Here Now.

Of the 46 shows that took place, 43 were recorded and made available on the band's website for direct download or on double CD via mail order. All the issued CDs featured the same artwork (cover and booklet), differing only in the band logo and the "Touring the Angel" title, which was embossed with a different colour metal foil for each show, and in the setlist, which was printed on an extra white card, and the venue and show date printed on the front and back covers and on the discs themselves.

== Recording the Angel releases ==
=== Shoreline Amphitheater, Mountain View, California, United States ===
Concert on 27 April 2006 / LHNCD01

Track listing

Disc one

1. Intro
2. A Pain That I'm Used To
3. A Question of Time
4. Suffer Well
5. Precious
6. Walking in My Shoes
7. Stripped
8. Home
9. In Your Room
10. Nothing's Impossible
11. I Feel You

Disc two

12. Behind the Wheel
13. World in My Eyes
14. Personal Jesus
15. Enjoy the Silence
16. Shake the Disease
17. Photographic
18. Never Let Me Down Again

=== Coachella Valley Music and Arts Festival, Indio, California, United States ===
Concert on 29 April 2006.

Track listing

Disc one

1. Intro
2. A Pain That I'm Used To
3. A Question of Time
4. Suffer Well
5. Precious
6. Walking in My Shoes
7. Stripped
8. Home
9. In Your Room
10. Nothing's Impossible
11. I Feel You

Disc two

12. Behind the Wheel
13. World in My Eyes
14. Personal Jesus
15. Enjoy the Silence
16. Shake the Disease
17. Photographic
18. Never Let Me Down Again

=== Theatre Under the Stars, Las Vegas, United States ===
Concert on 30 April 2006.

Track listing

Disc one

1. Intro
2. A Pain That I'm Used To
3. A Question of Time
4. Suffer Well
5. Precious
6. Walking in My Shoes
7. Stripped
8. Home
9. Blue Dress
10. In Your Room
11. Nothing's Impossible

Disc two

12. John the Revelator
13. I Feel You
14. Behind the Wheel
15. World in My Eyes
16. Personal Jesus
17. Enjoy the Silence
18. Shake the Disease
19. Photographic
20. Never Let Me Down Again

=== Foro Sol, Mexico City, Mexico ===
Concert on 4 May 2006.

Track listing

Disc one

1. Intro
2. A Pain That I'm Used To
3. A Question of Time
4. Suffer Well
5. Precious
6. Walking in My Shoes
7. Stripped
8. Home
9. Blue Dress
10. In Your Room
11. Nothing's Impossible

Disc two

12. John the Revelator
13. I Feel You
14. Behind the Wheel
15. World in My Eyes
16. Personal Jesus
17. Enjoy the Silence
18. Shake the Disease
19. Photographic
20. Never Let Me Down Again

=== Foro Sol, Mexico City, Mexico ===
Concert on 5 May 2006.

Track listing

Disc one

1. Intro
2. A Pain That I'm Used To
3. A Question of Time
4. Suffer Well
5. Precious
6. Walking in My Shoes
7. Stripped
8. Home
9. Judas
10. In Your Room
11. The Sinner in Me

Disc two

12. John the Revelator
13. I Feel You
14. Behind the Wheel
15. World in My Eyes
16. Personal Jesus
17. Enjoy the Silence
18. Leave in Silence
19. Just Can't Get Enough
20. Never Let Me Down Again

=== Monterrey Arena, Mexico ===
Concert on 7 May 2006.

Track listing

Disc one

1. Intro
2. A Pain That I'm Used To
3. A Question of Time
4. Suffer Well
5. Precious
6. Walking in My Shoes
7. Stripped
8. Home
9. It Doesn't Matter Two
10. In Your Room

Disc two

11. Nothing's Impossible
12. I Feel You
13. Behind the Wheel
14. World in My Eyes
15. Personal Jesus
16. Enjoy the Silence
17. Shake the Disease
18. Photographic
19. Never Let Me Down Again

=== Nikon at Jones Beach Theater, Wantagh, New York, United States ===
Concert on 13 May 2006.

Track listing

Disc one

1. Intro
2. A Pain That I'm Used To
3. A Question of Time
4. Suffer Well
5. Precious
6. Walking in My Shoes
7. Stripped
8. Home
9. Judas
10. In Your Room

Disc two

12. Nothing's Impossible
13. I Feel You
14. Behind the Wheel
15. World in My Eyes
16. Personal Jesus
17. Enjoy the Silence
18. Shake the Disease
19. Photographic
20. Never Let Me Down Again

=== PNC Bank Arts Center, Holmdel Township, New Jersey, United States ===
Concert on 14 May 2006.

Track listing

Disc one

1. Intro
2. A Pain That I'm Used To
3. A Question of Time
4. Suffer Well
5. Precious
6. Walking in My Shoes
7. Stripped
8. Home
9. It Doesn't Matter Two
10. In Your Room

Disc two

12. The Sinner in Me
13. I Feel You
14. Behind the Wheel
15. World in My Eyes
16. Personal Jesus
17. Enjoy the Silence
18. Leave in Silence
19. Photographic
20. Just Can't Get Enough
21. Never Let Me Down Again

=== Bell Centre, Montreal, Canada ===
Concert on 17 May 2006.

Track listing

Disc one

1. Intro
2. A Pain That I'm Used To
3. A Question of Time
4. Suffer Well
5. Precious
6. Walking in My Shoes
7. Stripped
8. Home
9. Judas
10. In Your Room

Disc two

12. Nothing's Impossible
13. I Feel You
14. John the Revelator
15. Behind the Wheel
16. World in My Eyes
17. Personal Jesus
18. Enjoy the Silence
19. Shake the Disease
20. Photographic
21. Never Let Me Down Again

=== Air Canada Centre, Toronto, Canada ===
Concert on 18 May 2006.

Track listing

Disc one

1. Intro
2. A Pain That I'm Used To
3. A Question of Time
4. Suffer Well
5. Precious
6. Walking in My Shoes
7. Stripped
8. Home
9. It Doesn't Matter Two
10. In Your Room
11. Nothing's Impossible
12. John the Revelator

Disc two

1. I Feel You
2. Behind the Wheel
3. World in My Eyes
4. Personal Jesus
5. Enjoy the Silence
6. Shake the Disease
7. Photographic
8. Never Let Me Down Again

=== Borgata Hotel Casino and Spa, Atlantic City, New Jersey, United States ===
Concert on 20 May 2006.

Track listing

Disc one

1. Intro
2. A Pain That I'm Used To
3. A Question of Time
4. Suffer Well
5. Precious
6. Walking in My Shoes
7. Stripped
8. Home
9. Judas
10. In Your Room
11. Nothing's Impossible

Disc two

12. John the Revelator
13. I Feel You
14. Behind the Wheel
15. World in My Eyes
16. Personal Jesus
17. Enjoy the Silence
18. Shake the Disease
19. Photographic
20. Never Let Me Down Again

=== Nissan Pavilion, Washington, D.C., United States ===
Concert on 21 May 2006.

Track listing

Disc one

1. Intro
2. A Pain That I'm Used To
3. A Question of Time
4. Suffer Well
5. Precious
6. Walking in My Shoes
7. Stripped
8. Home
9. It Doesn't Matter Two
10. In Your Room
11. Nothing's Impossible

Disc two

12. John the Revelator
13. I Feel You
14. Behind the Wheel
15. World in My Eyes
16. Personal Jesus
17. Enjoy the Silence
18. Leave in Silence
19. Photographic
20. Never Let Me Down Again

=== Rock im Park, Nuremberg, Germany ===
Concert on 2 June 2006.

Track listing

Disc one

1. Intro
2. A Pain That I'm Used To
3. A Question of Time
4. Suffer Well
5. Precious
6. Walking in My Shoes
7. Stripped
8. Home
9. In Your Room
10. Nothing's Impossible
11. John the Revelator

Disc two

12. I Feel You
13. Behind the Wheel
14. World in My Eyes
15. Personal Jesus
16. Enjoy the Silence
17. It Doesn't Matter Two
18. Photographic
19. Never Let Me Down Again

=== Rock am Ring, Nürburgring, Germany ===
Concert on 4 June 2006.

Track listing

Disc one

1. Intro
2. A Pain That I'm Used To
3. A Question of Time
4. Suffer Well
5. Precious
6. Walking in My Shoes
7. Stripped
8. Home
9. In Your Room
10. Nothing's Impossible
11. John the Revelator

Disc two

12. I Feel You
13. Behind the Wheel
14. World in My Eyes
15. Personal Jesus
16. Enjoy the Silence
17. Judas
18. Photographic
19. Never Let Me Down Again

=== Weserstadion, Bremen, Germany ===
Concert on 5 June 2006.

Track listing

Disc one

1. Intro
2. A Pain That I'm Used To
3. A Question of Time
4. Suffer Well
5. Precious
6. Walking in My Shoes
7. Stripped
8. Home
9. It Doesn't Matter Two
10. In Your Room
11. Nothing's Impossible
12. John the Revelator

Disc two

13. I Feel You
14. Behind the Wheel
15. World in My Eyes
16. Personal Jesus
17. Enjoy the Silence
18. Leave in Silence
19. Photographic
20. Never Let Me Down Again

=== NRGi Park, Aarhus, Denmark ===
Concert on 7 June 2006.

Track listing

Disc one

1. Intro
2. A Pain That I'm Used To
3. A Question of Time
4. Suffer Well
5. Precious
6. Walking in My Shoes
7. Stripped
8. Home
9. It Doesn't Matter Two
10. In Your Room
11. Nothing's Impossible
12. John the Revelator

Disc two

13. I Feel You
14. Behind the Wheel
15. World in My Eyes
16. Personal Jesus
17. Enjoy the Silence
18. Leave in Silence
19. Photographic
20. Never Let Me Down Again

=== Stadion Wojska Polskiego, Warsaw, Poland ===
Concert on 9 June 2006.

Track listing

Disc one

1. Intro
2. A Pain That I'm Used To
3. A Question of Time
4. Suffer Well
5. Precious
6. Walking in My Shoes
7. Stripped
8. Home
9. It Doesn't Matter Two
10. In Your Room
11. Nothing's Impossible
12. John the Revelator

Disc two

13. I Feel You
14. Behind the Wheel
15. World in My Eyes
16. Personal Jesus
17. Enjoy the Silence
18. Leave in Silence
19. Photographic
20. Never Let Me Down Again

=== Inter Stadium, Bratislava, Slovakia ===
Concert on 11 June 2006.

Track listing

Disc one

1. Intro
2. A Pain That I'm Used To
3. A Question of Time
4. Suffer Well
5. Precious
6. Walking in My Shoes
7. Stripped
8. Home
9. It Doesn't Matter Two
10. In Your Room
11. Nothing's Impossible
12. John the Revelator

Disc two

13. #I Feel You
14. Behind the Wheel
15. World in My Eyes
16. Personal Jesus
17. Enjoy the Silence
18. Leave in Silence
19. Photographic
20. Never Let Me Down Again

=== Puskas Ferenc Stadium, Budapest, Hungary ===
Concert on 12 June 2006.

Track listing

Disc one

1. Intro
2. A Pain That I'm Used To
3. A Question of Time
4. Suffer Well
5. Precious
6. Walking in My Shoes
7. Stripped
8. Home
9. Judas
10. In Your Room
11. Nothing's Impossible
12. John the Revelator

Disc two

12. I Feel You
13. Behind the Wheel
14. World in My Eyes
15. Personal Jesus
16. Enjoy the Silence
17. Leave in Silence
18. Photographic
19. Never Let Me Down Again

=== Bezigrad Stadium, Ljubljana, Slovenia ===
Concert on 14 June 2006.

Track listing

Disc one

1. Intro
2. A Pain That I'm Used To
3. A Question of Time
4. Suffer Well
5. Precious
6. Walking in My Shoes
7. Stripped
8. Home
9. It Doesn't Matter Two
10. In Your Room
11. Nothing's Impossible
12. John the Revelator

Disc two

12. I Feel You
13. Behind the Wheel
14. World in My Eyes
15. Personal Jesus
16. Enjoy the Silence
17. Shake the Disease
18. Photographic
19. Never Let Me Down Again

=== Heineken Jammin' Festival, Imola, Italy ===
Concert on 16 June 2006.

Track listing

Disc one

1. Intro
2. A Pain That I'm Used To
3. A Question of Time
4. Suffer Well
5. Precious
6. Walking in My Shoes
7. Stripped
8. Home
9. In Your Room
10. John the Revelator

Disc two

11. I Feel You
12. Behind the Wheel
13. World in My Eyes
14. Personal Jesus
15. Enjoy the Silence
16. Shake the Disease
17. Photographic
18. Never Let Me Down Again

=== Greenfield Festival, Interlaken, Switzerland ===
Concert on 17 June 2006.

Track listing

Disc one

1. Intro
2. A Pain That I'm Used To
3. A Question of Time
4. Suffer Well
5. Precious
6. Walking in My Shoes
7. Stripped
8. Home
9. In Your Room
10. John the Revelator

Disc two

12. I Feel You
13. Behind the Wheel
14. World in My Eyes
15. Personal Jesus
16. Enjoy the Silence
17. Shake the Disease
18. Photographic
19. Never Let Me Down Again

=== Lokomotiv Stadium, Sofia, Bulgaria ===
Concert on 21 June 2006.

Track listing

Disc one

1. Intro
2. A Pain That I'm Used To
3. A Question of Time
4. Suffer Well
5. Precious
6. Walking in My Shoes
7. Stripped
8. Home
9. It Doesn't Matter Two
10. In Your Room
11. Nothing's Impossible
12. John the Revelator

Disc two

12. I Feel You
13. Behind the Wheel
14. World in My Eyes
15. Personal Jesus
16. Enjoy the Silence
17. Shake the Disease
18. Photographic
19. Never Let Me Down Again

=== Stadionul Național, Bucharest, Romania ===
Concert on 23 June 2006.

Track listing

Disc one

1. Intro
2. A Pain That I'm Used To
3. A Question of Time
4. Suffer Well
5. Precious
6. Walking in My Shoes
7. Stripped
8. Home
9. It Doesn't Matter Two
10. In Your Room
11. Nothing's Impossible
12. John the Revelator

Disc two

13. I Feel You
14. Behind the Wheel
15. World in My Eyes
16. Personal Jesus
17. Enjoy the Silence
18. Leave in Silence
19. Photographic
20. Never Let Me Down Again

=== O_{2} Wireless Festival, London, England ===
Concert on 25 June 2006.

Track listing

Disc one

1. Intro
2. A Pain That I'm Used To
3. A Question of Time
4. Suffer Well
5. Precious
6. Walking in My Shoes
7. Stripped
8. Home
9. In Your Room
10. John the Revelator

Disc two

12. I Feel You
13. Behind the Wheel
14. World in My Eyes
15. Personal Jesus
16. Enjoy the Silence
17. Shake the Disease
18. Photographic
19. Never Let Me Down Again

=== The Point, Dublin, Ireland ===
Concert on 26 June 2006.

Track listing

Disc one

1. Intro
2. A Pain That I'm Used To
3. A Question of Time
4. Suffer Well
5. Precious
6. Walking in My Shoes
7. Stripped
8. Home
9. It Doesn't Matter Two
10. In Your Room
11. Nothing's Impossible
12. John the Revelator

Disc two

13. I Feel You
14. Behind the Wheel
15. World in My Eyes
16. Personal Jesus
17. Enjoy the Silence
18. Leave in Silence
19. Photographic
20. Never Let Me Down Again

=== Waldbühne, Berlin, Germany ===
Concert on 28 June 2006.

Track listing

Disc one

1. Intro
2. A Pain That I'm Used To
3. A Question of Time
4. Suffer Well
5. Precious
6. Walking in My Shoes
7. Stripped
8. Home
9. It Doesn't Matter Two
10. In Your Room
11. Nothing's Impossible
12. John the Revelator

Disc two

13. I Feel You
14. Behind the Wheel
15. World in My Eyes
16. Personal Jesus
17. Enjoy the Silence
18. Leave in Silence
19. Photographic
20. Never Let Me Down Again

=== City Square, Arras, France ===
Concert on 29 June 2006.

Track listing

Disc one

1. Intro
2. A Pain That I'm Used To
3. A Question of Time
4. Suffer Well
5. Precious
6. Walking in My Shoes
7. Stripped
8. Home
9. It Doesn't Matter Two
10. In Your Room
11. Nothing's Impossible
12. John the Revelator

Disc two

13. I Feel You
14. Behind the Wheel
15. World in My Eyes
16. Personal Jesus
17. Enjoy the Silence
18. Shake the Disease
19. Photographic
20. Never Let Me Down Again

=== Eurockeennes Festival, Belfort, France ===
Concert on 1 July 2006.

Track listing

Disc one

1. Intro
2. A Pain That I'm Used To
3. A Question of Time
4. Suffer Well
5. Precious
6. Walking in My Shoes
7. Stripped
8. Home
9. In Your Room
10. John the Revelator

Disc two

11. I Feel You
12. Behind the Wheel
13. World in My Eyes
14. Personal Jesus
15. Enjoy the Silence
16. Shake the Disease
17. Photographic
18. Never Let Me Down Again

=== Rock Werchter Festival, Werchter, Belgium ===
Concert on 2 July 2006.

Track listing

Disc one

1. Intro
2. A Pain That I'm Used To
3. A Question of Time
4. Suffer Well
5. Precious
6. Walking in My Shoes
7. Stripped
8. Home
9. In Your Room
10. John the Revelator

Disc two

11. I Feel You
12. Behind the Wheel
13. World in My Eyes
14. Personal Jesus
15. Enjoy the Silence
16. Leave in Silence
17. Photographic
18. Never Let Me Down Again

=== Olympic Stadium, Stockholm, Sweden ===
Concert on 7 July 2006.

Track listing

Disc one

1. Intro
2. A Pain That I'm Used To
3. A Question of Time
4. Suffer Well
5. Precious
6. Walking in My Shoes
7. Stripped
8. Home
9. It Doesn't Matter Two
10. In Your Room
11. Nothing's Impossible
12. John the Revelator

Disc two

12. I Feel You
13. Behind the Wheel
14. World in My Eyes
15. Personal Jesus
16. Enjoy the Silence
17. Shake the Disease
18. Photographic
19. Never Let Me Down Again

=== Moon and Stars Festival, Locarno, Switzerland ===
Concert on 10 July 2006.

Track listing

Disc one

1. Intro
2. A Pain That I'm Used To
3. A Question of Time
4. Suffer Well
5. Precious
6. Walking in My Shoes
7. Stripped
8. Home
9. It Doesn't Matter Two
10. In Your Room
11. Nothing's Impossible
12. John the Revelator

Disc two

13. I Feel You
14. Behind the Wheel
15. World in My Eyes
16. Personal Jesus
17. Enjoy the Silence
18. Leave in Silence
19. Photographic
20. Never Let Me Down Again

=== Waldbühne, Berlin, Germany ===
Concert on 12 July 2006.

Track listing

Disc one

1. Intro
2. A Pain That I'm Used To
3. A Question of Time
4. Suffer Well
5. Precious
6. Walking in My Shoes
7. Stripped
8. Home
9. Judas
10. In Your Room
11. John the Revelator
12. The Sinner in Me

Disc two

13. I Feel You
14. Behind the Wheel
15. World in My Eyes
16. Personal Jesus
17. Enjoy the Silence
18. Shake the Disease
19. Just Can't Get Enough
20. Never Let Me Down Again

=== Waldbühne, Berlin, Germany ===
Concert on 13 July 2006.

Track listing

Disc one

1. Intro
2. A Pain That I'm Used To
3. A Question of Time
4. Suffer Well
5. Precious
6. Walking in My Shoes
7. Stripped
8. Home
9. It Doesn't Matter Two
10. In Your Room
11. Nothing's Impossible
12. John the Revelator

Disc two

13. I Feel You
14. Behind the Wheel
15. World in My Eyes
16. Personal Jesus
17. Enjoy the Silence
18. Somebody
19. Photographic
20. Never Let Me Down Again

=== Festwiese, Leipzig, Germany ===
Concert on 15 July 2006.

Track listing

Disc one

1. Intro
2. A Pain That I'm Used To
3. A Question of Time
4. Suffer Well
5. Precious
6. Walking in My Shoes
7. Stripped
8. Home
9. It Doesn't Matter Two
10. In Your Room
11. Nothing's Impossible
12. John the Revelator

Disc two

13. I Feel You
14. Behind the Wheel
15. World in My Eyes
16. Personal Jesus
17. Enjoy the Silence
18. Somebody
19. Photographic
20. Never Let Me Down Again

=== Stadio Olimpico, Rome, Italy ===
Concert on 17 July 2006.

Track listing

Disc one

1. Intro
2. A Pain That I'm Used To
3. A Question of Time
4. Suffer Well
5. Precious
6. Walking in My Shoes
7. Stripped
8. Home
9. It Doesn't Matter Two
10. In Your Room
11. Nothing's Impossible
12. John the Revelator

Disc two

13. I Feel You
14. Behind the Wheel
15. World in My Eyes
16. Personal Jesus
17. Enjoy the Silence
18. Shake the Disease
19. Photographic
20. Never Let Me Down Again

=== Paleo Festival, Nyon, Switzerland ===
Concert on 19 July 2006.

Track listing

Disc one

1. Intro
2. A Pain That I'm Used To
3. A Question of Time
4. Suffer Well
5. Precious
6. Walking in My Shoes
7. Stripped
8. Home
9. In Your Room
10. John the Revelator

Disc two

11. I Feel You
12. Behind the Wheel
13. World in My Eyes
14. Personal Jesus
15. Enjoy the Silence
16. Leave in Silence
17. Photographic
18. Never Let Me Down Again

=== Arena, Nîmes, France ===
Concert on 20 July 2006.

Track listing

Disc one

1. Intro
2. A Pain That I'm Used To
3. A Question of Time
4. Suffer Well
5. Precious
6. Walking in My Shoes
7. Stripped
8. Home
9. It Doesn't Matter Two
10. In Your Room
11. Nothing's Impossible
12. John the Revelator

Disc two

13. I Feel You
14. Behind the Wheel
15. World in My Eyes
16. Personal Jesus
17. Enjoy the Silence
18. Leave in Silence
19. Photographic
20. Never Let Me Down Again

=== Anoeta Stadium, San Sebastián, Spain ===
Concert on 22 July 2006. Martin Gore's 45th birthday.

Track listing

Disc one

1. Intro
2. A Pain That I'm Used To
3. A Question of Time
4. Suffer Well
5. Precious
6. Walking in My Shoes
7. Stripped
8. Home
9. It Doesn't Matter Two
10. In Your Room
11. Nothing's Impossible
12. John the Revelator

Disc two

13. I Feel You
14. Behind the Wheel
15. World in My Eyes
16. Personal Jesus
17. Enjoy the Silence
18. Somebody
19. Happy Birthday Martin
20. Photographic
21. Never Let Me Down Again

=== Parque Antonio Soria, Torrevieja, Spain ===
Concert on 25 July 2006.

Track listing

Disc one

1. Intro
2. A Pain That I'm Used To
3. A Question of Time
4. Suffer Well
5. Precious
6. Walking in My Shoes
7. Stripped
8. Home
9. In Your Room
10. John the Revelator

Disc two

11. I Feel You
12. Behind the Wheel
13. World in My Eyes
14. Personal Jesus
15. Enjoy the Silence
16. Shake the Disease
17. Photographic
18. Never Let Me Down Again

=== Plaza de Toros, Granada, Spain ===
Concert on 26 July 2006.

Track listing

Disc one

1. Intro
2. A Pain That I'm Used To
3. A Question of Time
4. Suffer Well
5. Precious
6. Walking in My Shoes
7. Stripped
8. Home
9. In Your Room
10. John the Revelator

Disc two

11. I Feel You
12. Behind the Wheel
13. World in My Eyes
14. Personal Jesus
15. Enjoy the Silence
16. Leave in Silence
17. Photographic
18. Never Let Me Down Again

=== Kurucesme Arena, Istanbul, Turkey ===
Concert on 30 July 2006.

Track listing

Disc one

1. Intro
2. A Pain That I'm Used To
3. A Question of Time
4. Suffer Well
5. Precious
6. Walking in My Shoes
7. Stripped
8. Home
9. It Doesn't Matter Two
10. In Your Room

Disc two

11. John the Revelator
12. I Feel You
13. Behind the Wheel
14. World in My Eyes
15. Personal Jesus
16. Enjoy the Silence
17. Leave in Silence
18. Photographic
19. Never Let Me Down Again

=== Terra Vibe Park, Athens, Greece ===
Concert on 1 August 2006.

Track listing

Disc one

1. Intro
2. A Pain That I'm Used To
3. A Question of Time
4. Suffer Well
5. Precious
6. Walking in My Shoes
7. Stripped
8. Home
9. It Doesn't Matter Two
10. In Your Room
11. John the Revelator

Disc two

12. I Feel You
13. Behind the Wheel
14. World in My Eyes
15. Personal Jesus
16. Enjoy the Silence
17. Shake the Disease
18. Photographic
19. Never Let Me Down Again
