= Touring the Angel: Live in Milan =

Video by Depeche Mode
- Released: 25 September 2006
- Recorded: 18–19 February 2006
- Venues: Fila Forum (Milan, Italy)
- Genres: Synth-pop; new wave; electronic rock; alternative dance; industrial rock
- Length: 188 minutes
- Label: Mute
- Director: Blue Leach

Depeche Mode chronology
| One Night in Paris (2002) | Touring the Angel: Live in Milan (2006) | Tour of the Universe: Barcelona 20/21.11.09 (2010) |

Touring the Angel: Live in Milan is a live video album by English electronic music band Depeche Mode, released on 25 September 2006 by Mute Records. It was directed and filmed by Blue Leach at Fila Forum in Assago, near Milan, Italy, on 18 and 19 February 2006, during the band's 2005–06 Touring the Angel concert tour.

A special edition three-disc set was also released. The first disc features the full concert and extra songs (that were played on the other Milan show), while the second disc contains documentaries on the film, interviews with the band, Anton Corbijn (who designed the stage), extra songs (that were played on the other Milan show), tour projections, and more. The third disc is an audio CD containing every song from Playing the Angel that was played at the two shows. In the United States, the three-disc set is packaged in a digipak and the standard two-disc set, containing only the two DVDs, is in a keep case.

One day before its US release, 25 September, the film was screened for a one-time only show, which also included the documentary video, in various theatres across the country.

== Track listing ==
All songs written by Martin Gore, except "Suffer Well" and "I Want It All" which were written by Dave Gahan, Christian Eigner and Andrew Philpott, and "Just Can't Get Enough" which was written by Vince Clarke.

DVD

1. "I Want It All" (instrumental intro) – 1:48
2. "A Pain that I'm Used To" – 4:13 (Playing the Angel, 2005)
3. "John the Revelator" – 3:35 (Playing the Angel, 2005)
4. "A Question of Time" – 4:25 (Black Celebration, 1986)
5. "Policy of Truth" – 5:14 (Violator, 1990)
6. "Precious" – 4:42 (Playing the Angel, 2005)
7. "Walking in My Shoes" – 6:25 (Songs of Faith and Devotion, 1993)
8. "Suffer Well" – 3:36 (Playing the Angel, 2005)
9. "Macro" – 4:23 (Playing the Angel, 2005)
10. "Home" (with bits from the "Air 'Around The Golf'" Remix) – 5:35 (Ultra, 1997)
11. "I Want It All" – 5:20 (Playing the Angel, 2005)
12. "The Sinner in Me" – 5:14 (Playing the Angel, 2005)
13. "I Feel You" – 7:02 (Songs of Faith and Devotion, 1993)
14. "Behind the Wheel" – 5:13 (Music for the Masses, 1987)
15. "World in My Eyes" – 5:20 (Violator, 1990)
16. "Personal Jesus" – 6:08 (Violator, 1990)
17. "Enjoy the Silence" – 7:49 (Violator, 1990)
18. "Shake the Disease" (acoustic) – 5:52 (The Singles 81→85, 1985)
19. "Just Can't Get Enough" – 4:39 (Speak & Spell, 1981)
20. "Everything Counts" – 6:20 (Construction Time Again, 1983)
21. "Never Let Me Down Again" – 8:00 (Music for the Masses, 1987)
22. "Goodnight Lovers" – 4:16 (Exciter, 2001)

Bonus tracks

1. "A Question of Lust" – 4:28 (Black Celebration, 1986)
2. "Damaged People" – 4:01 (Playing the Angel, 2005)

Note: The intro played before "A Pain That I'm Used To" is also included in the film, but omitted from the "track select" menu.

Bonus DVD

1. Touring the Angel documentary (featuring Anton Corbijn who designed the stage and directed the "Suffer Well" video) – 20:24
2. Tour Announcement (video footage of the Düsseldorf, Germany Touring the Angel press conference) – 3:35
3. Playing the Angel EPK – 11:43
4. Touring the Angel Screens:
  1. "Behind the Wheel" – 5:10
  2. "The Sinner in Me" – 4:59
  3. "Walking in My Shoes" – 6:20
  4. "World in My Eyes" – 5:15
  5. "Never Let Me Down Again" – 6:12

Bonus CD

1. "A Pain That I'm Used To" – 4:13
2. "John the Revelator" – 3:35
3. "Precious" – 4:42
4. "Suffer Well" – 3:36
5. "Macro" – 4:23
6. "I Want It All" – 5:20
7. "The Sinner in Me" – 5:14
8. "Damaged People" – 4:01

== Personnel ==
- Dave Gahan – lead vocals; backing vocals on "Macro"
- Martin Gore – guitar, backing vocals, keyboards, bass guitar on "Suffer Well", lead vocals on "Macro", "Home", "Shake the Disease", "A Question of Lust" and "Damaged People", co-lead vocals on "A Question of Time", "Everything Counts" and "Never Let Me Down Again"
- Andy Fletcher – keyboards, backing vocals
- Christian Eigner – drums
- Peter Gordeno – keyboards, backing vocals

== Charts ==
=== Weekly charts ===
| Chart (2006) | Peak position |
|---|---|
| Austrian Music DVD Chart | 1 |
| Belgian Music DVD Chart (Flanders) | 2 |
| Belgian Music DVD Chart (Wallonia) | 1 |
| Czech Albums Chart | 7 |
| Danish Music DVD Chart | 2 |
| Dutch Music DVD Chart | 8 |
| Finnish Music DVD Chart | 5 |
| German Albums Chart | 2 |
| Greek Music DVD Chart | 1 |
| Hungarian Music DVD Chart | 1 |
| Irish Music DVD Chart | 2 |
| Italian Music DVD Chart | 1 |
| Portuguese Music DVD Chart | 2 |
| Spanish Music DVD Chart | 1 |
| Swedish Music DVD Chart | 1 |
| Swiss Albums Chart | 54 |
| UK Music Video Chart | 1 |

=== Year-end charts ===
| Chart (2006) | Position |
|---|---|
| Belgian Music DVD Chart (Flanders) | 19 |
| Belgian Music DVD Chart (Wallonia) | 6 |
| Swedish Music DVD Chart | 13 |

| Chart (2007) | Position |
|---|---|
| Belgian Music DVD Chart (Wallonia) | 43 |
| Italian Music DVD Chart | 15 |
| Swedish Music DVD Chart | 32 |

== Certifications and sales ==
| Region | Certification | Certified units/sales |
|---|---|---|
| France (SNEP) | 3× Platinum | 60,000^{*} |
| Germany (BVMI) | 2× Platinum | 100,000^{^} |
| Italy | — | 45,000 |
| Portugal (AFP) | Gold | 4,000^{^} |
| Spain (Promusicae) | Gold | 10,000^{^} |
| Switzerland (IFPI Switzerland) | Gold | 3,000^{^} |
^{*} Sales figures based on certification alone.^{^} Shipments figures based on certification alone.
