= Touring the Angel =

2005–06 concert tour by Depeche Mode

- Tour by Depeche Mode
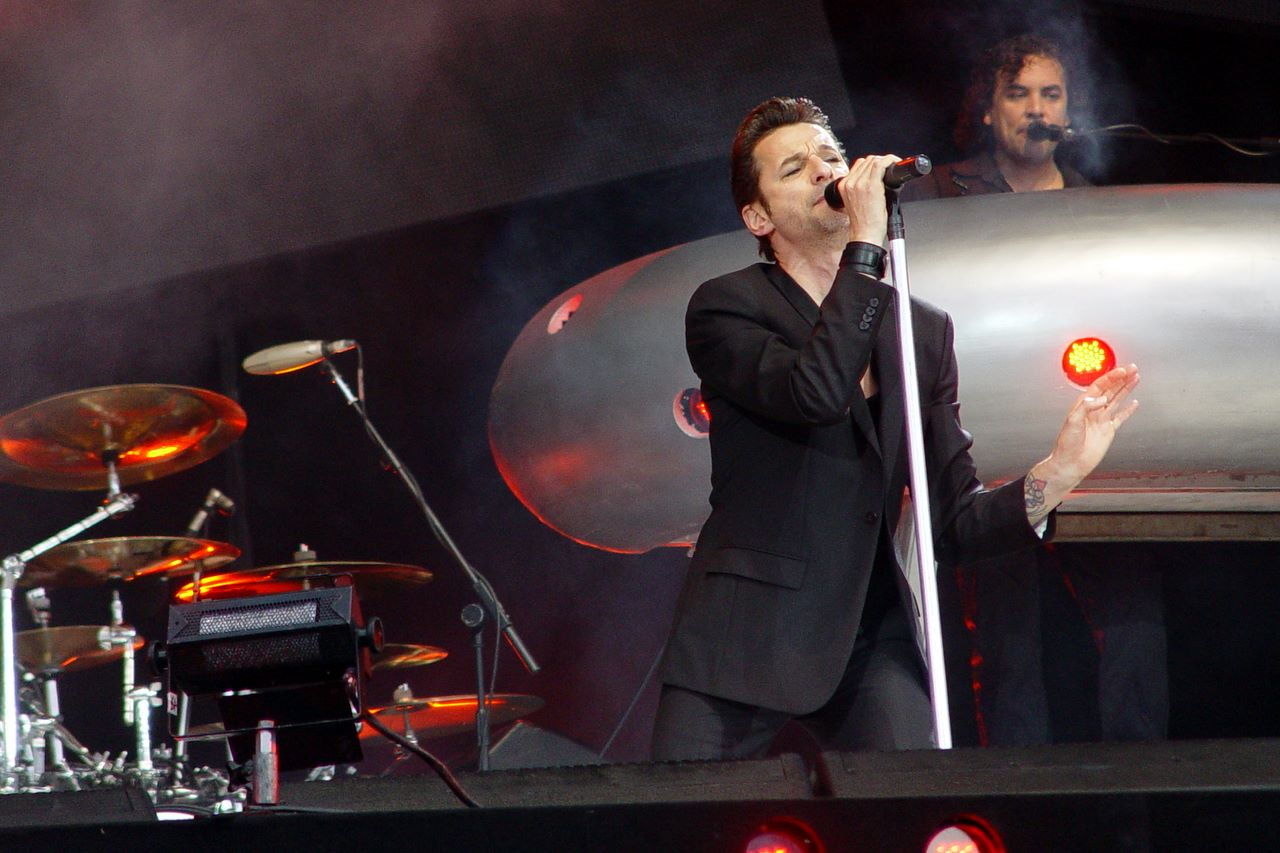
- Depeche Mode performing at the O_{2} Wireless Festival in London on 25 June 2006.
- Associated album: Playing the Angel
- Start date: 28 October 2005
- End date: 1 August 2006
- Legs: 4
- No. of shows: 85 in Europe; 39 in North America; 124 in total

Depeche Mode concert chronology
- Exciter Tour (2001); Touring the Angel (2005–06); Tour of the Universe (2009–10)

Touring the Angel was a 2005–06 concert tour by English electronic group Depeche Mode in support of the act's 11th studio album, Playing the Angel, which was released in October 2005.

The tour, which was officially announced in June 2005 in Düsseldorf, Germany, kicked off in October with a warm-up show in New York City called "Starting the Angel". It encompassed two continents, Europe and North America, with two legs between each.

The concerts held in Assago, near Milan, Italy were filmed and later released on a DVD release entitled Touring the Angel: Live in Milan.

== Overview ==
The stage set, which was designed by Anton Corbijn, was elaborate compared to previous Depeche Mode tours. It consisted of specially constructed pods to contain the act's MIDI controllers. Hidden screens at the rear of the stage, which displayed distorted images of the band members and movies related to the song being performed, were unveiled midway during the group's performance. These screens were accompanied by a large grey ball-shaped prop on the left of the stage, which contained an additional screen as well as a LED display which emitted various messages.

The tour began in late October 2005 with a special rehearsal show in New York City, dubbed "Starting the Angel". The date was exclusive to invited guests, most of whom won access through radio station and internet contests. The first full-fledged show was in Tampa, Florida in early November, kicking off a six-week North American leg. The tour was supposed to begin in Sunrise, Florida, but that date was cancelled due to the after-effects of Hurricane Wilma, which had spread across southern Florida a week prior to the show. The first leg ultimately concluded mid-December at the annual Almost Acoustic Christmas show, organised by radio station KROQ, in Universal City, California. The unique performance saw the band play a selection of songs in a stripped-down acoustic set.

In January 2006, the group kicked off an extensive tour of Europe, beginning in Dresden, Germany. The leg lasted twelve weeks and included multiple shows in a number of cities. It also saw the addition of "Leave in Silence" in the group's setlists, which had not been performed live since the Black Celebration Tour in 1986. The 1984 song "Lie to Me" was considered for inclusion on the tour, although it was never played live. The tour eventually finished in early April with two dates in London; the band were the first act to perform in the newly refurbished Wembley Arena.

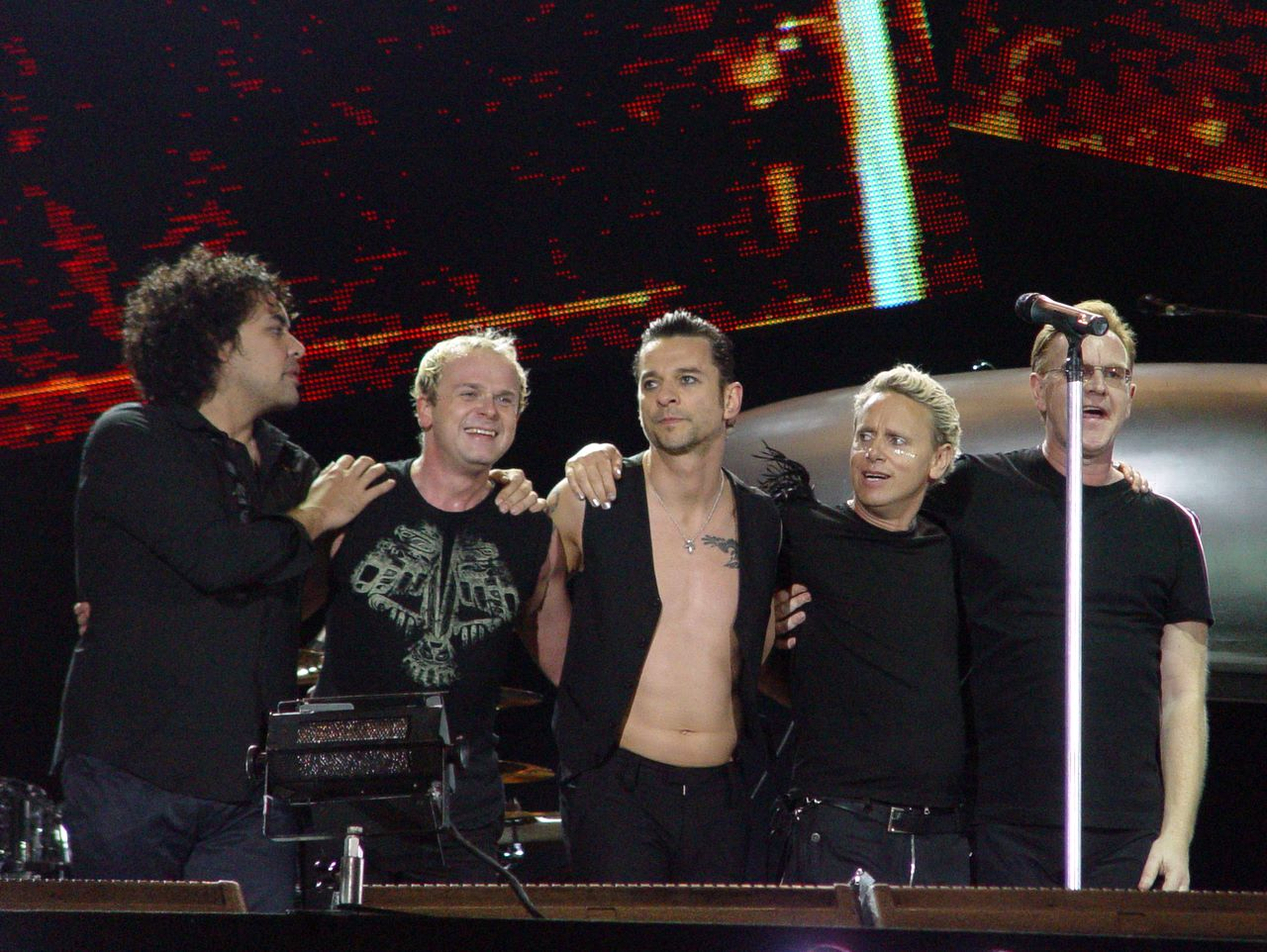
The group following a performance at the O_{2} Wireless Festival in London in June 2006. l-r: Peter Gordeno, Christian Eigner, Dave Gahan, Martin Gore, Andrew Fletcher

In April 2006, the group returned to North America for a second round of shows, taking place in a mixture of indoor and outdoor venues. The leg began in Mountain View, California, followed by an appearance at the Coachella Valley Music and Arts Festival in Indio, California.

In May 2006, the tour was slightly disrupted when lead singer Dave Gahan developed laryngitis during the group's performance at the Starlight Theatre in Kansas City, Missouri. Six tracks into the concert, Gahan left the stage for Martin Gore to begin his solo set performance, which was promptly extended by four additional songs until Gahan's condition was clarified. The show was officially cut and the concert to be held the following night in Chicago was cancelled. A press release regarding the cancellations stated that Gahan's voice was "challenged throughout the concert by the unusually cold temperatures at the venue" as well as a result of "coming off three concerts in Mexico." No make-up date was announced to compensate for the axed performance in Kansas City. The tour resumed in Wantagh, New York and concluded later in the month in Bristow, Virginia.

In June 2006, the group began a second leg in Europe. All shows, apart from one in Dublin, were held outdoors. A number of dates were festival appearances, from the Heineken Jammin' Festival in Italy to the Benicàssim Festival in Spain. The leg kicked off in Nuremberg, Germany at the Rock im Park Festival.

Two dates on this leg were cancelled. A show to be held in Lisbon was pulled after it was claimed that the organisation promoting the shows had failed to pay suppliers' bills. Another date, to be held in Tel Aviv, Israel, was cancelled due to the Second Lebanon War. It was stated that the group's technical support team refused to travel to the region, citing "security fears". The show was to be their first ever in Israel, as well as the sole Asian performance and final date of the entire tour. The trek instead culminated in Athens at Terra Vibe Park in early August, after nine months and 124 shows. In total, the band played to more than 2.8 million people across 32 countries. The group eventually performed in Israel on Tour of the Universe in 2009.

Speaking about the tour, Gahan praised it as "probably the most enjoyable, rewarding live show we've ever done. The new material was just waiting to be played live. It took on a life of its own. With the energy of the crowds, it just came to life."

Audio recordings of concerts on Touring the Angel were made available through the band's website on double CD format or as a digital download under the generic name Recording the Angel. All dates on the second legs of North America and Europe, excluding the shows in Kansas City, Kristiansand and Benicàssim, were released.

In September 2006, a live DVD of the group's concerts at the Fila Forum in Milan, Italy was released, entitled Touring the Angel: Live in Milan. The video was filmed and directed by Blue Leach.

== Set list ==
Set list for North America, leg #1
and Europe, leg #1
1. "I Want It All" (instrumental intro)
2. "A Pain That I'm Used To"
3. "John the Revelator"
4. "A Question of Time"
5. "Policy of Truth"
6. "Precious"
7. "Walking in My Shoes"
8. "Suffer Well"
9. Song performed by Martin Gore
  - "Damaged People"
  - "Macro"
  - "Leave in Silence" (acoustic)
10. Song performed by Martin Gore
  - "Home" (with bits from the "Air 'Around the Golf'" remix)
11. "I Want It All"
12. "The Sinner in Me"
13. "I Feel You"
14. "Behind the Wheel"
15. "World in My Eyes"
16. "Personal Jesus"
17. "Enjoy the Silence"
18. Song performed by Martin Gore
  - "Somebody"
  - "A Question of Lust"
  - "Shake the Disease" (acoustic)
  - "Leave in Silence" (acoustic)
19. "Just Can't Get Enough"
20. "Everything Counts"
21. "Never Let Me Down Again"
22. "Goodnight Lovers"
General set list for North America, leg #2
and Europe, leg #2
1. "I Want It All" (instrumental intro)
2. "A Pain That I'm Used To"
3. "A Question of Time"
4. "Suffer Well"
5. "Precious"
6. "Walking in My Shoes"
7. "Stripped"
8. Song performed by Martin Gore
  - "Home" (with bits from the "Air 'Around the Golf'" remix)
9. Song performed by Martin Gore
  - "Blue Dress" (acoustic)
  - "Judas" (acoustic)
  - "It Doesn't Matter Two" (acoustic)
10. "In Your Room" (Zephyr mix)
  - "Nothing's Impossible"
11. "The Sinner in Me"
12. "John the Revelator"
13. "I Feel You"
14. "Behind the Wheel"
15. "World in My Eyes"
16. "Personal Jesus"
17. "Enjoy the Silence"
18. Song performed by Martin Gore
  - "Shake the Disease" (acoustic)
  - "Leave in Silence" (acoustic)
  - "Judas" (acoustic)
  - "It Doesn't Matter Two" (acoustic)
  - "Somebody"
  - "Photographic"
  - "Just Can't Get Enough"
19. "Never Let Me Down Again"

Set list for rehearsal shows for fans
1. "I Want It All" (instrumental intro)
2. "A Pain That I'm Used To"
3. "John the Revelator"
4. "A Question of Time"
5. "Precious"
6. "Walking in My Shoes"
7. "Suffer Well"
8. Song performed by Martin Gore
  - "Damaged People"
  - "Home" (with bits from the "Air 'Around the Golf'" remix)
9. "I Want It All"
10. "The Sinner in Me"
11. "I Feel You"
  - "John the Revelator"
12. "Behind the Wheel"
13. "World in My Eyes"
14. "Personal Jesus"
15. "Enjoy the Silence"
Set list for KROQ Almost Acoustic Christmas
  - "Personal Jesus" (acoustic)
  - "Walking in My Shoes" (acoustic)
  - "Precious" (acoustic)
  - "I Want It All" (acoustic)
1. Song performed by Martin Gore
  - "Damaged People"
  - "A Question of Lust"
2. "The Sinner in Me"
3. "I Feel You"
4. "John the Revelator"
5. "Behind the Wheel"
6. "Enjoy the Silence"
7. Song performed by Martin Gore
  - "Shake the Disease" (acoustic)
8. "Never Let Me Down Again"

== Tour dates ==
List of concerts, showing date, city, country, and venue
Date	City	Country	Venue/Event
North America
28 October 2005	New York City	United States	Bowery Ballroom
3 November 2005	Tampa	United States	St. Pete Times Forum
5 November 2005	Duluth	United States	Arena at Gwinnett Center
7 November 2005	Houston	United States	Toyota Center
8 November 2005	Dallas	United States	American Airlines Center
9 November 2005	San Antonio	United States	SBC Center
11 November 2005	Denver	United States	Magness Arena
12 November 2005	West Valley City	United States	The E Center
15 November 2005	Vancouver	Canada	General Motors Place
16 November 2005	Seattle	United States	KeyArena
18 November 2005	San Jose	United States	HP Pavilion
19 November 2005	San Diego	United States	iPayOne Center
21 November 2005	Los Angeles	United States	Staples Center
22 November 2005	Los Angeles	United States	Staples Center
23 November 2005	Anaheim	United States	Arrowhead Pond
25 November 2005	Glendale	United States	Glendale Arena
26 November 2005	Las Vegas	United States	The Joint
29 November 2005	Rosemont	United States	Allstate Arena
30 November 2005	Auburn Hills	United States	The Palace of Auburn Hills
1 December 2005	Toronto	Canada	Air Canada Centre
3 December 2005	Atlantic City	United States	Borgata Event Center
4 December 2005	Montreal	Canada	Centre Bell
7 December 2005	New York City	United States	Madison Square Garden
8 December 2005	New York City	United States	Madison Square Garden
9 December 2005	Fairfax	United States	Patriot Center
11 December 2005	Universal City	United States	Gibson Amphitheatre (KROQ Almost Acoustic Christmas)
Europe
13 January 2006	Dresden	Germany	Messehalle
15 January 2006	Hamburg	Germany	Color Line Arena
16 January 2006	Hamburg	Germany	Color Line Arena
18 January 2006	Berlin	Germany	Velodrom
20 January 2006	Düsseldorf	Germany	LTU Arena
21 January 2006	Düsseldorf	Germany	LTU Arena
23 January 2006	Prague	Czech Republic	Sazka Arena
24 January 2006	Erfurt	Germany	Messehalle
26 January 2006	Frankfurt	Germany	Festhalle Frankfurt
29 January 2006	Antwerp	Belgium	Sportpaleis
31 January 2006	Geneva	Switzerland	SEG Geneva Arena
1 February 2006	Marseille	France	Le Dôme de Marseille
3 February 2006	Toulouse	France	Le Zénith
4 February 2006	Lyon	France	Halle Tony Garnier
6 February 2006	Madrid	Spain	Palacio de Deportes
7 February 2006	Madrid	Spain	Palacio de Deportes
8 February 2006	Lisbon	Portugal	Pavilhão Atlântico
10 February 2006	Barcelona	Spain	Palau Sant Jordi
11 February 2006	Barcelona	Spain	Palau Sant Jordi
14 February 2006	Munich	Germany	Olympiahalle
15 February 2006	Munich	Germany	Olympiahalle
16 February 2006	Vienna	Austria	Wiener Stadthalle
18 February 2006	Assago	Italy	Fila Forum
19 February 2006	Assago	Italy	Fila Forum
21 February 2006	Paris	France	Palais Omnisports Bercy
22 February 2006	Paris	France	Palais Omnisports Bercy
23 February 2006	Paris	France	Palais Omnisports Bercy
25 February 2006	Copenhagen	Denmark	Parken Stadium
26 February 2006	Gothenburg	Sweden	Scandinavium
28 February 2006	Oslo	Norway	Oslo Spektrum
1 March 2006	Stockholm	Sweden	Globe Arena
3 March 2006	Saint Petersburg	Russia	CKK Arena
4 March 2006	Moscow	Russia	Luzhniki Palace of Sports
6 March 2006	Helsinki	Finland	Hartwall Arena
9 March 2006	Stuttgart	Germany	Hanns-Martin-Schleyer-Halle
10 March 2006	Friedrichshafen	Germany	Messehalle
11 March 2006	Mannheim	Germany	SAP Arena
13 March 2006	Graz	Austria	Messehalle
14 March 2006	Katowice	Poland	Spodek
16 March 2006	Tallinn	Estonia	Saku Suurhall Arena
17 March 2006	Riga	Latvia	Arena Riga
18 March 2006	Vilnius	Lithuania	Siemens Arena
21 March 2006	Budapest	Hungary	László Papp Budapest Sports Arena
22 March 2006	Zagreb	Croatia	Dom Sportova
24 March 2006	Amnéville	France	Le Galaxie
25 March 2006	Douai	France	Gayant Expo
26 March 2006	Rotterdam	Netherlands	Rotterdam Ahoy
28 March 2006	Zürich	Switzerland	Hallenstadion
30 March 2006	Manchester	England	Manchester Evening News Arena
31 March 2006	Birmingham	England	National Exhibition Centre
2 April 2006	London	England	Wembley Arena
3 April 2006	London	England	Wembley Arena
North America
27 April 2006	Mountain View	United States	Shoreline Amphitheatre
29 April 2006	Indio	United States	Empire Polo Club (Coachella Valley Music and Arts Festival)
30 April 2006	Las Vegas	United States	Theatre Under The Stars
4 May 2006	Mexico City	Mexico	Foro Sol
5 May 2006	Mexico City	Mexico	Foro Sol
7 May 2006	Monterrey	Mexico	Monterrey Arena
10 May 2006	Kansas City	United States	Starlight Theatre
13 May 2006	Wantagh	United States	Jones Beach Amphitheater
14 May 2006	Holmdel	United States	PNC Bank Arts Center
17 May 2006	Montreal	Canada	Centre Bell
18 May 2006	Toronto	Canada	Air Canada Centre
20 May 2006	Atlantic City	United States	Borgata Event Center
21 May 2006	Bristow	United States	Nissan Pavilion
Europe
2 June 2006	Nuremberg	Germany	Luitpoldarena (Rock im Park)
4 June 2006	Nürburg	Germany	Nürburgring (Rock am Ring)
5 June 2006	Bremen	Germany	Weserstadion
7 June 2006	Aarhus	Denmark	NRGi Park
9 June 2006	Warsaw	Poland	Stadion Legii
11 June 2006	Bratislava	Slovakia	Inter Štadión
12 June 2006	Budapest	Hungary	Ferenc Puskás Stadium
14 June 2006	Ljubljana	Slovenia	Bežigrad Stadium
16 June 2006	Imola	Italy	Autodromo Enzo e Dino Ferrari (Heineken Jammin' Festival)
17 June 2006	Interlaken	Switzerland	Greenfield Festival
21 June 2006	Sofia	Bulgaria	Lokomotiv Stadium
23 June 2006	Bucharest	Romania	Stadionul Național
25 June 2006	London	England	Hyde Park (O_{2} Wireless Festival)
26 June 2006	Dublin	Ireland	Point Theatre
28 June 2006	Berlin	Germany	Waldbühne
29 June 2006	Arras	France	Grand-Place d'Arras (Main Square Festival)
1 July 2006	Belfort	France	Site Naturel du Malsaucy (Eurockéennes)
2 July 2006	Werchter	Belgium	Festivalpark (Rock Werchter)
6 July 2006	Kristiansand	Norway	Quart Festival
7 July 2006	Stockholm	Sweden	Stockholm Olympic Stadium
10 July 2006	Locarno	Switzerland	Piazza Grande (Moon and Stars)
12 July 2006	Berlin	Germany	Waldbühne
13 July 2006	Berlin	Germany	Waldbühne
15 July 2006	Leipzig	Germany	Festwiese
17 July 2006	Rome	Italy	Stadio Olimpico
19 July 2006	Nyon	Switzerland	Paléo Festival
20 July 2006	Nîmes	France	Arena of Nîmes
22 July 2006	San Sebastián	Spain	Anoeta Stadium
23 July 2006	Benicàssim	Spain	Festival Internacional de Benicàssim
25 July 2006	Torrevieja	Spain	Parque Antonio Soria
26 July 2006	Granada	Spain	Plaza de Toros
30 July 2006	Istanbul	Turkey	Turkcell Kuruçeşme Arena
1 August 2006	Athens	Greece	Terra Vibe Park

== Support acts ==
- The Bravery (3–12 November 2005; 3–9 December 2005; 13 January – 3 April 2006)
- Booka Shade (Berlin (28 June 2006))
- Chantage (Istanbul)
- DJ Gogo (Locarno)
- DJ Vania (Bucharest)
- Franz Ferdinand (Rome)
- Goldfrapp (Wantagh, Bremen, Arras, Berlin (12 and 13 June 2006), Leipzig and Nîmes)
- Timo Maas (Warsaw)
- Mohair (Aarhus)
- Muse (Stockholm)
- Natural Project (San Sebastián)
- Nova Generacia (Sofia)
- Pamela (Istanbul)
- Placebo (Budapest (12 June 2006) and Ljubljana)
- The Raveonettes (15 November – 1 December 2005; 5 and 7 June 2006; 22–26 July 2006; 1 August 2006)
- Second (San Sebastián and Granada)
- Scarling. (Rome)
- Schiller (Athens)
- Scissor Sisters (Mountain View)
- She Wants Revenge (27 April – 10 May 2006; 14–21 May 2006)
- Sistem (Bucharest)
- The Sisters of Mercy (Bratislava)
- Soulsavers (Rotterdam)
- Sugarplum Fairy (Stockholm)
- Șuie Paparude (Bucharest)
- Pati Yang (Warsaw)

== Musicians ==
=== Depeche Mode ===
- Dave Gahan – lead and backing vocals
- Martin Gore – guitar, synthesizers, bass guitar, lead and backing vocals
- Andy Fletcher – synthesizers, backing vocals

=== Additional musicians ===
- Peter Gordeno – synthesizers, bass guitar, backing vocals
- Christian Eigner – drums
