= List of Billboard number-one electronic albums of 2005 =

These are the albums that reached number one on the Billboard Dance/Electronic Albums chart in 2005.

== Chart history ==
Key
†	Indicates best-performing album of 2005

Issue date	Album	Artist	Reference
January 1	Give Up	The Postal Service	
January 8	Give Up	The Postal Service	
January 15	Give Up	The Postal Service	
January 22	Give Up	The Postal Service	
January 29	Give Up	The Postal Service	
February 5	Give Up	The Postal Service	
February 12	Push the Button	The Chemical Brothers	
February 19	Push the Button	The Chemical Brothers	
February 26	Fired Up! 2	Various artists	
March 5	Fired Up! 2	Various artists	
March 12	The Cosmic Game	Thievery Corporation	
March 19	The Cosmic Game	Thievery Corporation	
March 26	Fired Up! 2	Various artists	
April 2	Human After All	Daft Punk	
April 9	Hotel	Moby	
April 16	Hotel	Moby	
April 23	Hotel	Moby	
April 30	Hotel	Moby	
May 7	Hotel	Moby	
May 14	Waiting for the Sirens' Call	New Order	
May 21	Waiting for the Sirens' Call	New Order	
May 28	Waiting for the Sirens' Call	New Order	
June 4	Waiting for the Sirens' Call	New Order	
June 11	Demon Days †	Gorillaz	
June 18	Demon Days †	Gorillaz	
June 25	Demon Days †	Gorillaz	
July 2	Demon Days †	Gorillaz	
July 9	Demon Days †	Gorillaz	
July 16	Demon Days †	Gorillaz	
July 23	Demon Days †	Gorillaz	
July 30	Demon Days †	Gorillaz	
August 6	Demon Days †	Gorillaz	
August 13	Demon Days †	Gorillaz	
August 20	Demon Days †	Gorillaz	
August 27	Demon Days †	Gorillaz	
September 3	Demon Days †	Gorillaz	
September 10	Demon Days †	Gorillaz	
September 17	Demon Days †	Gorillaz	
September 24	Demon Days †	Gorillaz	
October 1	Demon Days †	Gorillaz	
October 8	Demon Days †	Gorillaz	
October 15	Demon Days †	Gorillaz	
October 22	Demon Days †	Gorillaz	
October 29	Demon Days †	Gorillaz	
November 5	Playing the Angel	Depeche Mode	
November 12	Playing the Angel	Depeche Mode	
November 19	Demon Days †	Gorillaz	
November 26	Demon Days †	Gorillaz	
December 3	Confessions on a Dance Floor	Madonna	
December 10	Confessions on a Dance Floor	Madonna	
December 17	Confessions on a Dance Floor	Madonna	
December 24	Confessions on a Dance Floor	Madonna	
December 31	Confessions on a Dance Floor	Madonna	
