= Martyr (song) =

2006 single by Depeche Mode

Single by Depeche Mode

from the album The Best of Depeche Mode Volume 1
- B-side: "Never Let Me Down Again" (remix)
- Released: 30 October 2006
- Length: 3:23 (album/single version); 3:07 (radio version)
- Label: Mute
- Songwriter: Martin Gore
- Producer: Ben Hillier

Depeche Mode singles chronology
"John the Revelator" / "Lilian" (2006)	"Martyr" (2006)	"Wrong" (2009)

Music video
- "Martyr" on YouTube

"Martyr" is a song by English electronic music band Depeche Mode. It was released as a non-album single to promote the band's eighth greatest hits compilation album, The Best of, Volume 1. The single was released on 30 October 2006 in three formats: CD single, CD maxi and DVD single. There was also a limited-edition double 12-inch single featuring four remixes of previous Depeche Mode tracks.

Following its release, "Martyr" topped the singles charts of Italy and Spain while attaining a peak of number 13 on the UK Singles Chart and entering the top 20 in six other European nations. It debuted and peaked at number two on the Eurochart Hot 100, and in the United States, it reached number 22 on the Billboard Hot Dance Club Play chart. The single became Depeche Mode's 35th and last UK top-20 hit.

== Background ==
The song, originally titled "Martyr for Love", is a well-known missing track from the Playing the Angel sessions. The song was mentioned during one of the FletchCam videos (where it can faintly be heard playing in the background), and was mentioned in interviews. Playing the Angel programmer Dave McCracken has said that it was considered by the band as the first single from Playing the Angel, but it did not make the album due to its poppier sound when compared with other album tracks.

== Music video ==
A video was being directed by Andreas Nilsson, who was reportedly hired because Dave Gahan was impressed by his video for The Knife's "Silent Shout". The video was made in Gothenburg, Sweden, and members of the group do not appear in it. The band subsequently rejected this video, which was replaced with a video montage released on 8 October 2006 and directed by Robert Chandler, in which Gahan seemingly sings the song, this being achieved by the succession of short clips of Depeche Mode's videos in which Gahan either says the words featured in the lyrics of "Martyr", or he lip-syncs the lyrics, meaning that his lips move in a similar fashion of that when the words in the lyrics are being said. It does not appear on The Best of Videos Volume 1.

== Track listing ==
European limited-edition 7-inch picture disc

A. "Martyr" (single version) – 3:26
B. "Never Let Me Down Again" (Digitalism remix) – 4:39

European 12-inch single

A1. "Martyr" (Booka Shade dub mix) – 8:15
B1. "Martyr" (Dreher & S.M.Art B.N. Reload remix) – 5:17
B2. "Martyr" (Alex Smoke Gravel edit) – 6:39

European CD single

1. "Martyr" (single version) – 3:25
2. "Martyr" (Booka Shade full vocal mix edit) – 6:23

European limited-edition CD single

1. "Martyr" (Paul van Dyk remix edit) – 7:19
2. "Martyr" (Alex Smoke Gravel mix) – 6:41
3. "Never Let Me Down Again" (Digitalism remix) – 4:39

European DVD single

1. "Martyr" (video montage)
2. "Martyr" (Dreher & S.M.Art B.N. Reload remix audio)
3. "Martyr" (Booka Shade Travel mix audio)

Digital download EP

1. "Martyr" (Paul van Dyk radio mix) – 3:38
2. "Martyr" (Paul van Dyk Vonyc Lounge mix edit) – 5:02
3. "Martyr" (Dreher & S.M.Art B.N. Reload edit) – 5:03
4. "Martyr" (Alex Smoke Bare Bone edit) – 3:07
5. "Martyr" (Booka Shade full vocal mix edit) – 6:20
6. "Martyr" (Booka Shade Travel mix edit) – 4:48
7. "Personal Jesus" (Boys Noize classic) – 6:53

== Charts ==
=== Weekly charts ===
Weekly chart performance for "Martyr"
Chart (2006)	Peak position
Austria (Ö3 Austria Top 40)	31
Belgium (Ultratop 50 Flanders)	48
Belgium (Ultratip Bubbling Under Wallonia)	4
Belgium (Ultratop 50 Wallonia Dance)	21
Czech Republic Airplay (ČNS IFPI)	44
Denmark (Tracklisten)	3
Europe (Eurochart Hot 100)	2
Finland (Suomen virallinen lista)	18
France (SNEP)	64
Germany (GfK)	2
Hungary (Single Top 40)	2
Ireland (IRMA)	32
Italy (FIMI)	1
Netherlands (Single Top 100)	74
Scottish Singles Sales (Official Charts)	12
Slovakia Airplay (ČNS IFPI)	38
Spain (Promusicae)	1
Sweden (Sverigetopplistan)	10
Switzerland (Schweizer Hitparade)	17
UK Singles (Official Charts)	13
US Dance Club Songs (Billboard)	22

=== Year-end charts ===
Year-end chart performance for "Martyr"
Chart (2006)	Position
Italy (FIMI)	41

== See also ==
- List of number-one hits of 2006 (Italy)
- List of number-one singles of 2006 (Spain)
