= List of number-one hits of 2005 (Italy) =

This is a list of the number-one hits of 2005 on FIMI's Italian Singles and Albums Charts.

Week	Issue date	Song	Artist	Album	Artist
1	7 January	"Do They Know It's Christmas?"	Band Aid 20	Best of Blue	Blue
2	14 January	"Cleptomania"	Sugarfree	Greatest Hits	Robbie Williams
3	21 January	"Cleptomania"	Sugarfree	Bula Bula	Mina
4	28 January	"Cleptomania"	Sugarfree	Crescendo e cercando	Claudio Baglioni
5	4 February	"Cleptomania"	Sugarfree	It's Time	Michael Bublé
6	11 February	"Get Right"	Jennifer Lopez	Convivendo parte 2	Biagio Antonacci
7	18 February	"Get Right"	Jennifer Lopez	Convivendo parte 2	Biagio Antonacci
8	25 February	"Cleptomania"	Sugarfree	Convivendo parte 2	Biagio Antonacci
9	4 March	"Angelo"	Francesco Renga	It's Time	Michael Bublé
10	11 March	"I bambini fanno "ooh...""	Povia	It's Time	Michael Bublé
11	18 March	"I bambini fanno "ooh...""	Povia	It's Time	Michael Bublé
12	25 March	"I bambini fanno "ooh...""	Povia	It's Time	Michael Bublé
13	1 April	"I bambini fanno "ooh...""	Povia	It's Time	Michael Bublé
14	8 April	"I bambini fanno "ooh...""	Povia	It's Time	Michael Bublé
15	15 April	"I bambini fanno "ooh...""	Povia	It's Time	Michael Bublé
16	22 April	"I bambini fanno "ooh...""	Povia	Devils & Dust	Bruce Springsteen
17	29 April	"I bambini fanno "ooh...""	Povia	Terrestre	Subsonica
18	6 May	"I bambini fanno "ooh...""	Povia	4Ever Blue	Blue
19	13 May	"I bambini fanno "ooh...""	Povia	Buon Sangue	Jovanotti
20	20 May	"I bambini fanno "ooh...""	Povia	Buon Sangue	Jovanotti
21	27 May	"I bambini fanno "ooh...""	Povia	Don't Believe the Truth	Oasis
22	3 June	"I bambini fanno "ooh...""	Povia	X&Y	Coldplay
23	10 June	"I bambini fanno "ooh...""	Povia	X&Y	Coldplay
24	17 June	"I bambini fanno "ooh...""	Povia	X&Y	Coldplay
25	24 June	"I bambini fanno "ooh...""	Povia	Tutto Max	Max Pezzali and 883
26	1 July	"I bambini fanno "ooh...""	Povia	Tutto Max	Max Pezzali and 883
27	8 July	"I bambini fanno "ooh...""	Povia	Tutto Max	Max Pezzali and 883
28	15 July	"I bambini fanno "ooh...""	Povia	Tutto Max	Max Pezzali and 883
29	22 July	"Army of Lovers"	Lee Ryan	Tutto Max	Max Pezzali and 883
30	29 July	"Army of Lovers"	Lee Ryan	Tutto Max	Max Pezzali and 883
31	5 August	"Army of Lovers"	Lee Ryan	Tutto Max	Max Pezzali and 883
32	12 August	"Army of Lovers"	Lee Ryan	Tutto Max	Max Pezzali and 883
33	19 August	"I bambini fanno "ooh...""	Povia	Tutto Max	Max Pezzali and 883
34	26 August	"The Importance of Being Idle"	Oasis	Tutto Max	Max Pezzali and 883
35	2 September	"La Camisa Negra"	Juanes	A Bigger Bang	The Rolling Stones
36	9 September	"La Camisa Negra"	Juanes	A Bigger Bang	The Rolling Stones
37	16 September	"La nostra vita"	Eros Ramazzotti	Nome e cognome	Ligabue
38	23 September	"La nostra vita"	Eros Ramazzotti	Nome e cognome	Ligabue
39	30 September	"Precious"	Depeche Mode	Nome e cognome	Ligabue
40	7 October	"La nostra vita"	Eros Ramazzotti	Iguana cafè	Pino Daniele
41	14 October	"Tripping"	Robbie Williams	Playing the Angel	Depeche Mode
42	21 October	"Big City Life"	Mattafix	Intensive Care	Robbie Williams
43	28 October	"Big City Life"	Mattafix	Calma apparente	Eros Ramazzotti
44	4 November	"Hung Up"	Madonna	Calma apparente	Eros Ramazzotti
45	11 November	"Hung Up"	Madonna	Confessions on a Dance Floor	Madonna
46	18 November	"Hung Up"	Madonna	Il dono	Renato Zero
47	25 November	"Hung Up"	Madonna	Il dono	Renato Zero
48	2 December	"Hung Up"	Madonna	Il dono	Renato Zero
49	9 December	"Hung Up"	Madonna	Il dono	Renato Zero
50	16 December	"Hung Up"	Madonna	In direzione ostinata e contraria	Fabrizio De André
51	23 December	"Hung Up"	Madonna	Il dono	Renato Zero
52	30 December	"Hung Up"	Madonna	Buoni o cattivi live Anthology 04.05	Vasco Rossi

== See also ==
- 2005 in music
- List of number-one hits in Italy
