= John the Revelator / Lilian =

2006 double A-side single by Depeche Mode

"John the Revelator" / "Lilian"

Single by Depeche Mode

from the album Playing the Angel
- Released: 5 June 2006
- Studio: Sound Design (Santa Barbara, California)
- Genre: Synth-pop
- Length: 3:14 ("John the Revelator"); 3:34 ("Lilian")
- Label: Mute
- Songwriter: Martin Gore
- Producer: Ben Hillier

Depeche Mode singles chronology
"Suffer Well" (2006)	"John the Revelator" / "Lilian" (2006)	"Martyr" (2006)

Music video
- "John the Revelator" on YouTube

"John the Revelator" and "Lilian" are two songs by English electronic music band Depeche Mode, issued as a double A-side single on 5 June 2006. Both songs are included on the band's 11th studio album, Playing the Angel (2005), and served as the fourth single from the album. The single became another UK top-20 hit for the band, reaching number 18. "John the Revelator" was edited down several seconds for the single, while "Lilian" was slightly remixed and the introduction was shortened.

The single is the second UK double A-side release by the band, after "Blasphemous Rumours / Somebody" in 1984. "John the Revelator" was played during Depeche Mode's Touring the Angel tour and can be watched on the tour's DVD. Dave Gahan also performed "John the Revelator" on his Imposter shows with the band Soulsavers.

== Background ==
"John the Revelator" is based on the 1930s folk song of the same name. Martin Gore said in a French interview that the song "talks about faith in God, no matter what. It also denounces the belief in a God who punishes and damns. In the 'Book of Revelation,' John describes his visions of these seven angels descending, blowing into their seven trumpets and causing plagues, epidemics, and floods that gradually exterminate a large part of humanity. Only the true believers remain. I do not believe in all that."

== Reception ==
Sarah Walters of Manchester Evening News praised "John the Revelator" saying, "There's a few bips here and a smattering of plips there to fuel the digitised feel of everything and it scores fairly highly for Gahan's vocal performance alone, but the tune is unlikely to win the Mode any more converts." She was more critical on "Lilian", saying that it "is musically DM circa-1981 and lyrically somewhere around 1989, which makes for a curious mix that doesn't really hit the spot."

Drowned in Sound reviewer Nick Cowen praised both of the songs saying, "'John the Revelator', a groovy little number about Biblical scrawlings, sports a welcome strut and swagger, while the haunting synth-line of 'Lilian' embeds itself in your head after a couple of listens. Both come packed with Depeche Mode's usual casing of computerised blips and beeps, and both are sure to lighten up any black-clad dance-floor."

== Track listing ==
7-inch single
1. "John the Revelator" (UNKLE dub)
2. "Lilian" (Robag Wruhme Slomoschen Kikker)

12-inch single

A1. "John the Revelator" (Dave Is in the Disco Tiefschwarz remix)
AA1. "John the Revelator" (Tiefschwarz dub)
AA2. "Lilian" (Chab dub)

Limited-edition 12-inch single

A1. "John the Revelator" (Murk Mode dub)
AA1. "John the Revelator" (Boosta club remix)
AA2. "Lilian" (Chab vocal remix)

CD1

1. "John the Revelator" (single version) – 3:14
2. "Lilian" (single version) – 3:34

CD2

1. "John the Revelator" (Dave Is in the Disco Tiefschwarz remix) – 7:49
2. "John the Revelator" (Murk Mode remix) – 7:13
3. "John the Revelator" (UNKLE re construction) – 4:59
4. "John the Revelator" (Boosta club remix) – 4:47
5. "John the Revelator" (Tiefschwarz dub) – 8:12

DVD single

1. "John the Revelator" (video)
2. "Nothing's Impossible" (bare—audio)
3. "Lilian" (Chab vocal remix—audio)

== Charts ==
Weekly chart performance for "John the Revelator" / "Lilian"
Chart (2006)	Peak position
Belgium (Ultratip Bubbling Under Wallonia)	16
Denmark (Tracklisten)	1
Europe (Eurochart Hot 100)	19
Finland (Suomen virallinen lista)	16
Germany (GfK)	16
Hungary (Single Top 40)	5
Ireland (IRMA)	22
Italy (FIMI)	16
Scottish Singles Sales (Official Charts)	14
Spain (Promusicae)	2
Sweden (Sverigetopplistan)	19
Switzerland (Schweizer Hitparade)	70
UK Singles (Official Charts)	18
US Dance Club Songs (Billboard)	38
