= Ferenc Puskás Stadium =

Demolished football stadium in Hungary

Coordinates: 47°30′11″N 19°5′54″E

Ferenc Puskás Stadium (Puskás Ferenc Stadion)
- Népstadion, Puskás
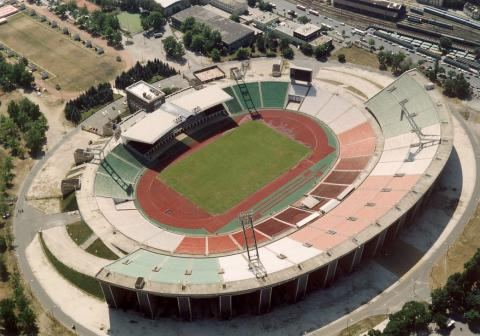
- Interactive map of Ferenc Puskás Stadium (Puskás Ferenc Stadion)
- Former names: Népstadion ("People's Stadium")
- Location: Zugló, Budapest, Hungary
- Capacity: 38,652 (before demolition); 100,000 (initially)
- Record attendance: 104,000 (Vasas Budapest–Rapid Wien, 28 July 1956)
- Field size: 105×70 m
- Public transit: Puskás Ferenc Stadion

Construction
- Built: 1948–1953
- Opened: 20 August 1953
- Closed: 2016
- Demolished: 2017
- Architect: Károly Dávid Jenő Gilyén

Tenants
- Hungary national football team (1953–2014); Zalaegerszeg (2002–2003); Debrecen (2009–2010); Ferencváros (2013–2014)

The Ferenc Puskás Stadium (Hungarian: Puskás Ferenc Stadion), or formerly People's Stadium (Népstadion), was a multi-purpose stadium in the 14th district (Zugló) of Budapest, Hungary. It was situated between the Puskás Ferenc Stadion and the Keleti pályaudvar metro stations. It was used mainly for football matches. The stadium, which was an all-seater, in the 2000s had a safe capacity of 38,652, though its original capacity exceeded 100,000. The stadium was closed in 2016 and demolished in 2017 to make way for the Puskás Aréna.

== History ==
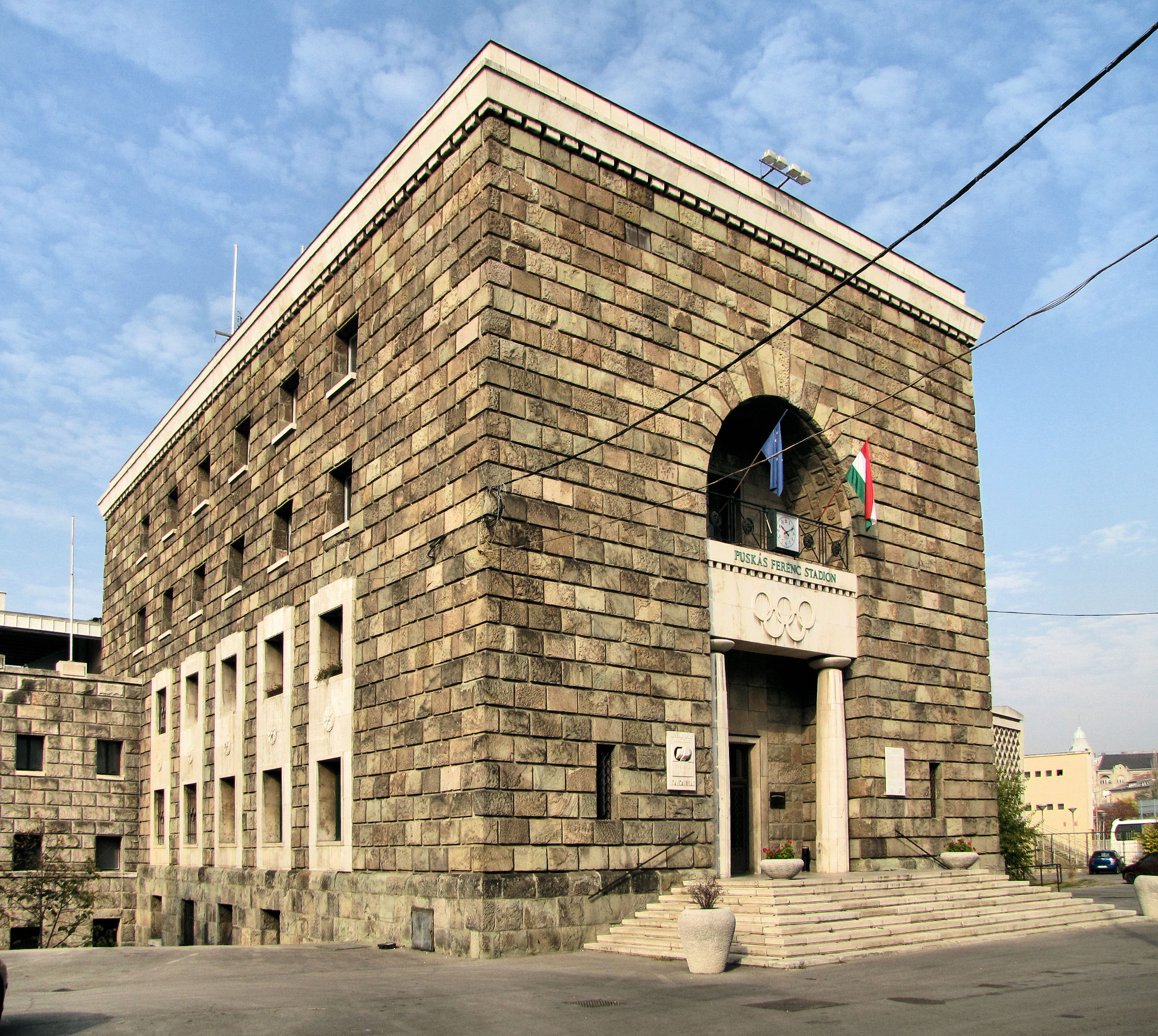
The entrance of the stadium

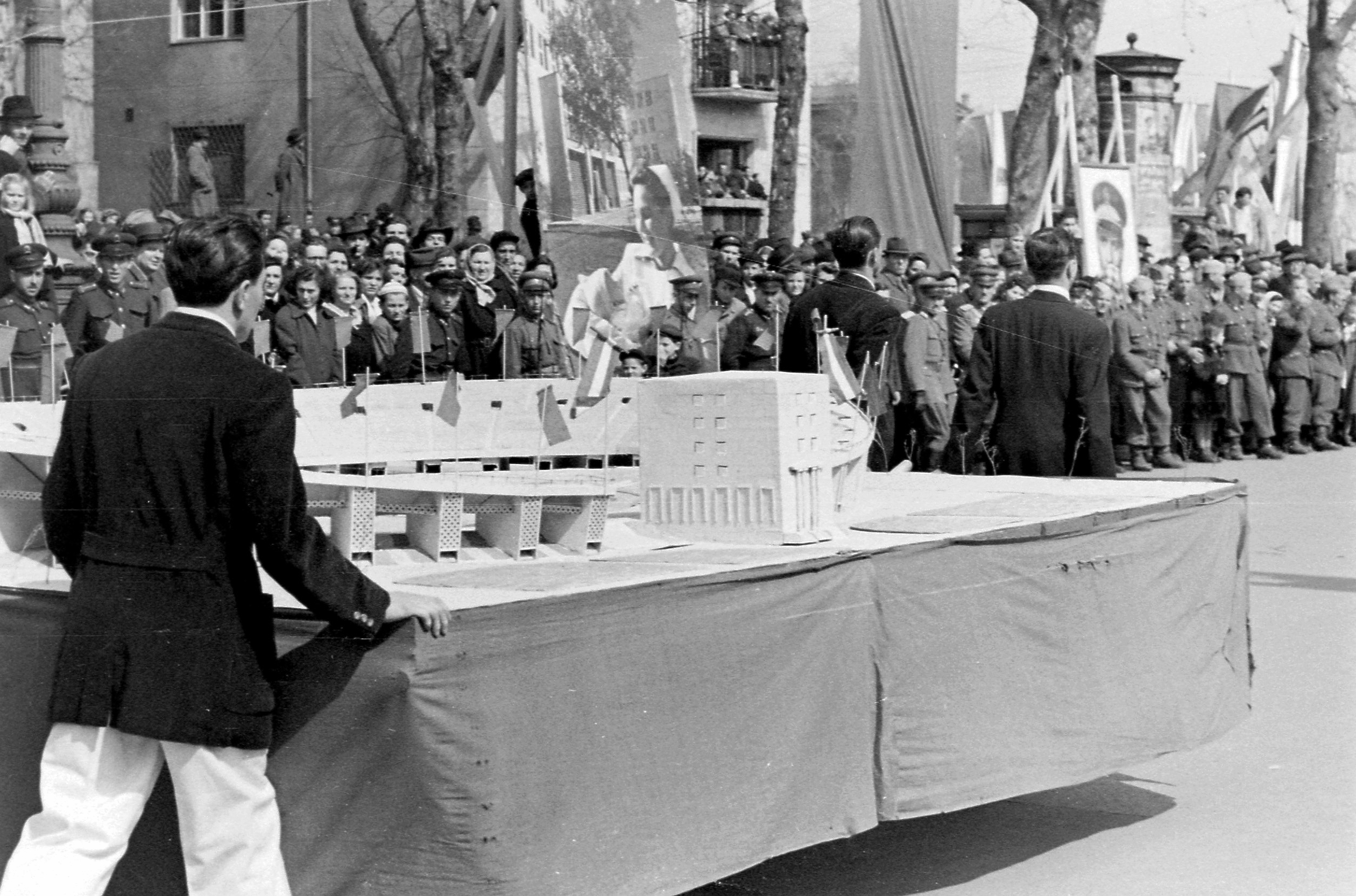
The plan of the stadium

The first plan of a national stadium were drafted as early as 1896 when there were chances that Budapest would host the first modern Olympic Games.

In 1911, Budapest was one of the frontrunners to host the 1920 Olympics. However, after Austria-Hungary's defeat in World War I, the Games were awarded to Antwerp instead.

The location of the first plan included Budapest XI. district and Budapest X. district.

In 1924, the government imposed a sport tax which was supposed to be use for the construction of a new national stadium, but finally this money was not used for the construction.

The stadium was built between 1948 and 1953 using a large number of volunteers, including soldiers. It opened in 1953 as Népstadion' ("People's Stadium"). Less than one year later, on 23 May 1954, the English football team suffered its worst ever defeat here (7–1).

On 14 August 2002, Zalaegerszegi TE moved their UEFA Champions League qualifying match first leg from their home ground to this stadium in order to host Manchester United in order to accommodate a 40,000 crowd. They were rewarded with Zalaegerszeg scoring their most famous European victory, winning 1–0 with Béla Koplárovics becoming the hero with a 92nd-minute winner. Zalaegerszegi lost the return leg at Old Trafford 0–5 and went out of the competition 1–5 on aggregate.

In 2002, the stadium was renamed in honour of Ferenc Puskás, widely regarded as the best striker in the world in his time and Hungary's greatest footballer ever, who was the star of the national team during its glory years of the late 1940s and early 1950s.

== Milestone matches ==
20 August 1953	Budapest Honvéd FC (Hungary)	3–2	(Soviet Union) FC Spartak Moscow	Opening match

20 August 1955	Vasas SC (Hungary)	3–2	(Hungary) Budapest Honvéd FC	First Magyar Kupa Final; 1955 Magyar Kupa Final
	Teleki 8'; Raduly 29'; Bundzsák 78'	Report	23' Kocsis; 77' Budai	Attendance: 40,000; Referee: Árpád Kamarás-Klein

25 May 2014	Újpest (Hungary)	1–1 (a.e.t.) (4–3 p)	(Hungary) Diósgyőr	Last Magyar Kupa Final; 2014 Magyar Kupa Final
19:00 CEST	Litauszki 6'	Summary; Report (Hungarian)	Bacsa 90'	Attendance: 22,000; Referee: Péter Solymosi
	Penalties
	Vasiljević (penalty scored); Litauszki (penalty scored); Tshibuabua (penalty scored); Simon (penalty scored)		(penalty scored) Kostić; (penalty scored) Bacsa; (penalty missed) William Alves; (penalty scored) Barczi; (penalty missed) Husić

1 June 2014	Ferencvárosi TC (Hungary)	2–0	(Hungary) Paksi FC	Last Nemzeti Bajnokság I match 2013–14 Nemzeti Bajnokság I
	Bönig 54'; Leandro 82' (p.)	Report		Attendance: 13,689; Referee: Zoltán Iványi (Hungary)

7 June 2014	Hungary	3–0	Kazakhstan	Last international match
	Priskin 26'; Varga 63'; Engel 90+1' (o.g.)	Report		Attendance: 10,445; Referee: Boucaut Alexandre (Belgium)

24 July 2014	Ferencváros (Hungary)	1–2	(Croatia) Rijeka	Last UEFA Europa League match 2014–15 UEFA Europa League
20:30	Ugrai 65' (pen.)	Report	Krstanović 20' (pen.); Samardžić 37'	Attendance: 5,127; Referee: Paolo Valeri (Italy)

== Famous performances ==
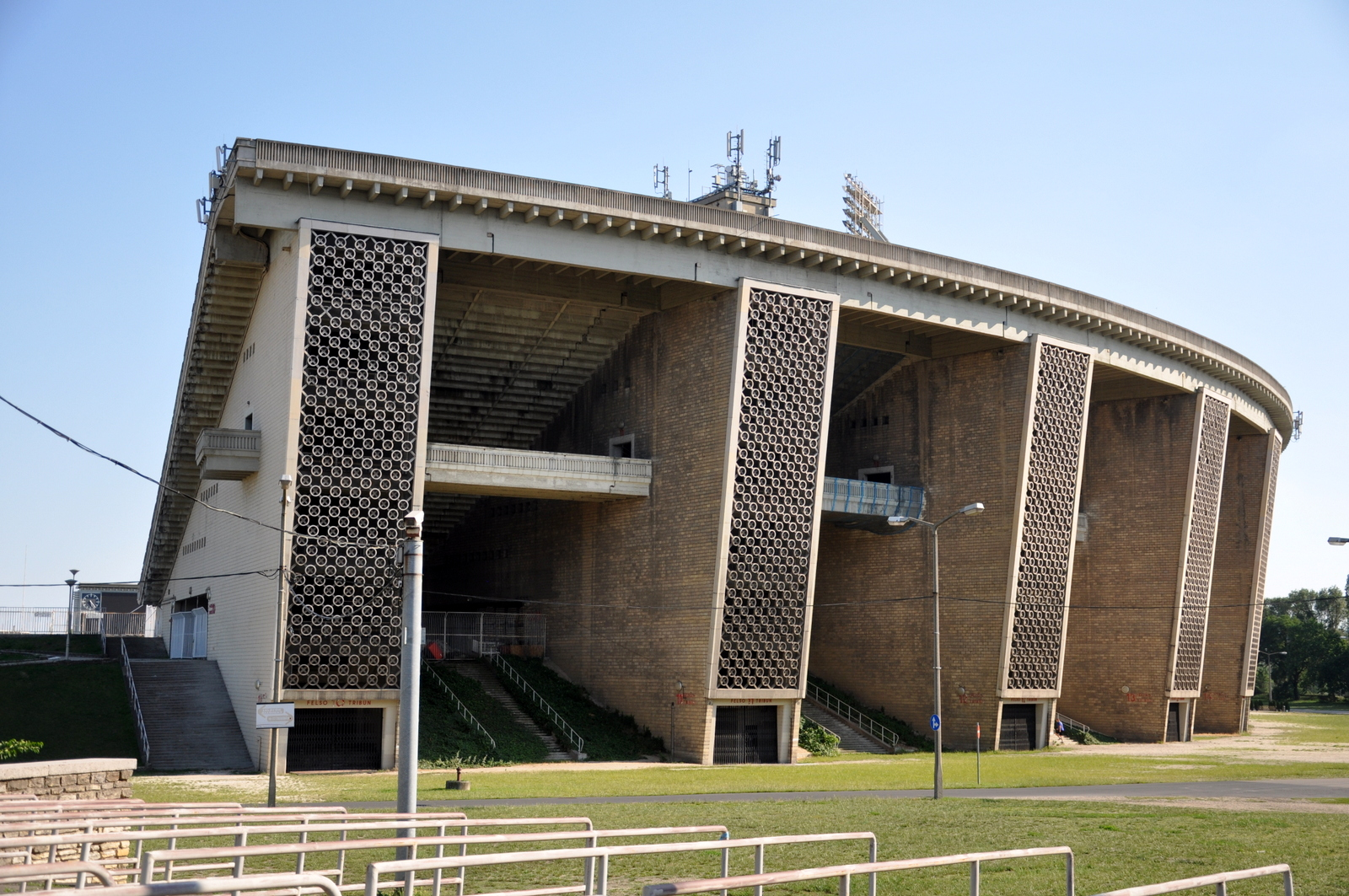
The closed upper tier

Queen performed at the stadium during their Magic Tour on 27 July 1986 in front of a crowd in excess of 80,000 people, some who had travelled from Poland and USSR. Another 45,000 ticketless fans heard the show over the loudspeakers outside the stadium. The concert was filmed and released worldwide as Hungarian Rhapsody: Queen Live in Budapest. This was one of the last performances by Queen with Freddie Mercury.

In 1988, the stadium hosted the only stop in a communist country of the Human Rights Now! tour, with the artists Hobo Blues Band, Tracy Chapman, Youssou N'Dour, Peter Gabriel, Sting and Bruce Springsteen & The E Street Band. 81 000 people attended.

Monsters of Rock (including AC/DC, Metallica, Mötley Crüe & Queensrÿche) took place at the stadium in 1991.

U2 performed at the stadium on 23 July 1993 during their ZooTV Tour, in front of a crowd of 60,000 people.

Here was Michael Jackson's HIStory World Tour second performance on 10 September 1996, for a total audience of 65,000.

The stadium hosted the 1998 European Athletics Championships.

The stadium doubled for Munich's famous Olympic Stadium in Steven Spielberg's 2005 film Munich (see List of films shot in Budapest).

Lord of the Dance creator, Michael Flatley performed his latest dance show, Celtic Tiger Live in the stadium on 9 July 2005. The concert was performed first time for the public. The rehearsals were also done here. The show was filmed for DVD and some scenes of the show, most notably the opening sequence, were placed on the DVD which also has scenes of the performance in the NIA of Birmingham, England. The scenes of the rehearsals were placed on the DVD as part of the Bonus features.

Depeche Mode performed at the stadium three times: the first one was on 12 June 2006 during their Touring the Angel. The second one was on 23 June 2009 during their Tour of the Universe, in front of a crowd of 34,716 people. The third one was on 21 May 2013 during their Delta Machine Tour, in front of a sold-out crowd of 33,200 people. The 2006 and 2009 shows were recorded for the group's live albums projects Recording the Angel and Recording the Universe, respectively.

Roger Waters performed The Wall in the stadium on 25 August 2013.

== Panorama ==
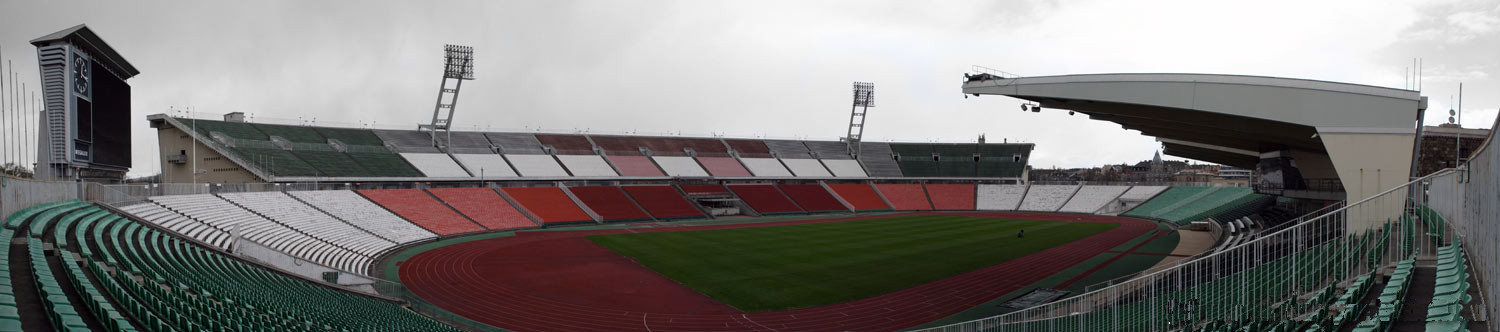
Panorama of Puskás Ferenc Stadion (ex-Népstadion) in Budapest

== Concerts ==
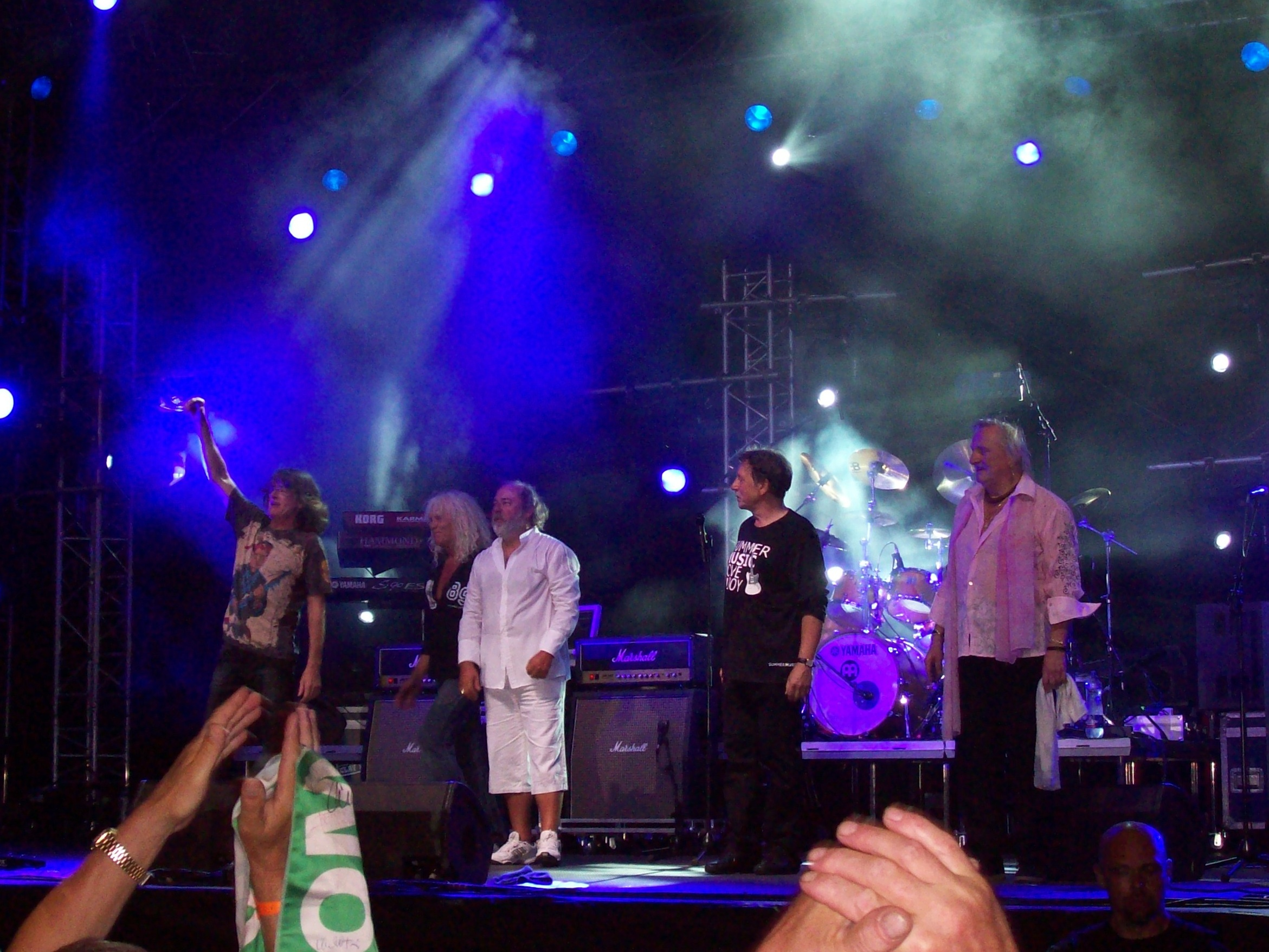
Omega playing at the Puskás

- 1965 – Louis Armstrong
- 1986 – Queen
- 1987 – Genesis
- 1987 – U2
- 1988 – Human Rights concert: Peter Gabriel, Sting, Bruce Springsteen

81 000 (Amnesty magazine)

- 1990 – Illés & István, a király
- 1991 – AC/DC, Metallica, Mötley Crüe, Queensrÿche
- 1992 – Guns N' Roses
- 1993 – U2
- 1993 – Jean-Michel Jarre
- 1994 – Omega
- 1995 – Hungária
- 1995 – The Rolling Stones
- 1996 – Michael Jackson, Tina Turner
- 1999 – Omega, P. Mobil
- 2001 – Illés, Metró, Omega
- 2004 – Omega
- 2005 – Neoton Família
- 2006 – Depeche Mode
- 2006 – Robbie Williams
- 2007 – George Michael
- 2007 – The Rolling Stones
- 2009 – Depeche Mode
- 2010 – Metallica
- 2013 – Depeche Mode
- 2013 – Roger Waters

== Tenants ==
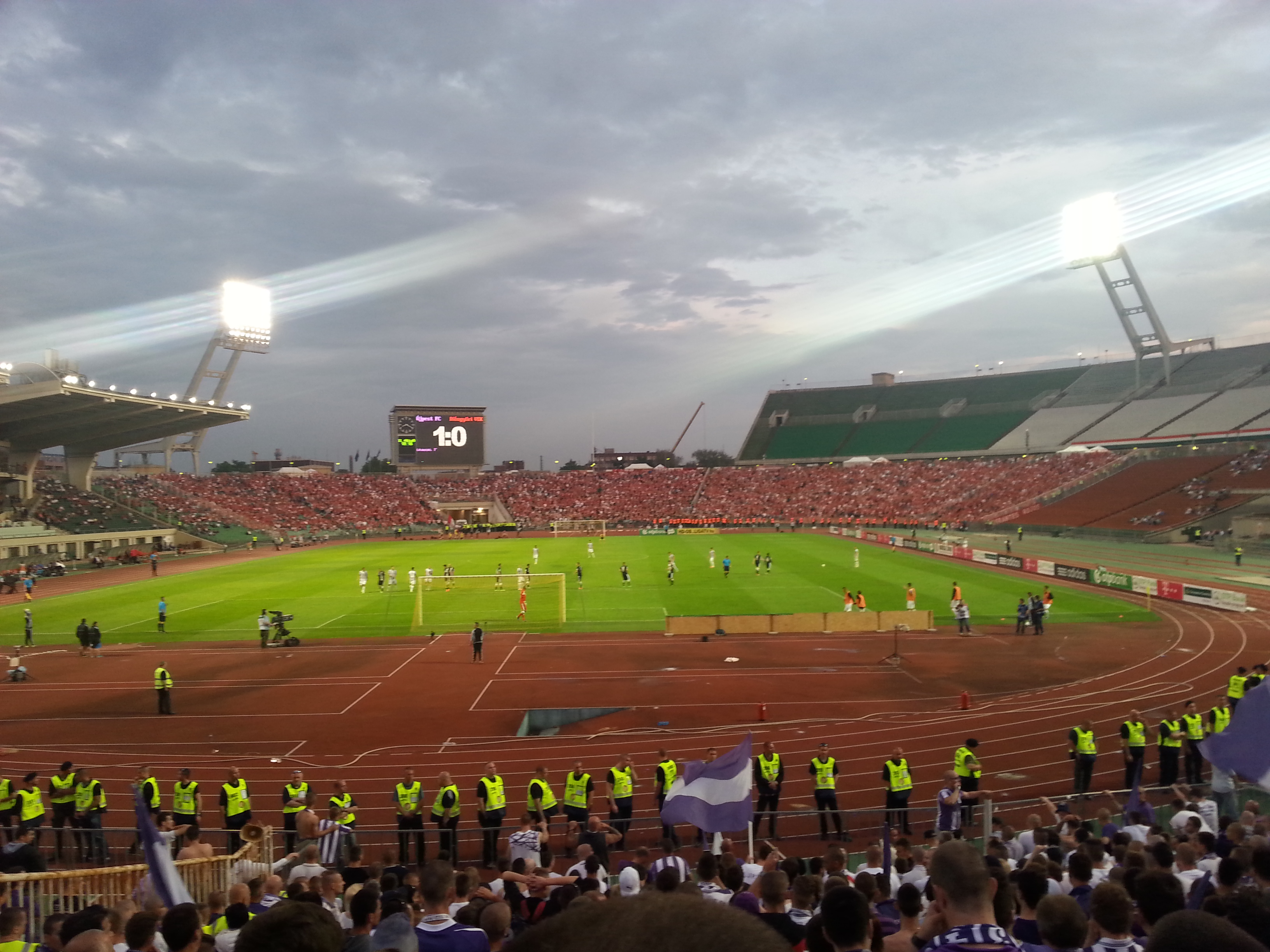
The last Magyar Kupa Final in the old Puskás on 25 May 2014 between Újpest and Diósgyőr

On 14 August 2002, Zalaegerszegi TE hosted Manchester United F.C. in the third round of the 2002–03 UEFA Champions League qualifying rounds because the ZTE Arena did not meet UEFA requirements.

The 2009–10 UEFA Champions League group stage matches of Debreceni VSC were played in the stadium because the Oláh Gábor utcai Stadion did not meet UEFA requirements. The first group stage match was played on 29 September 2009 against Olympique Lyonnais. On 20 October 2009, Debrecen hosted ACF Fiorentina in the second group stage match at home. The last match was played on 24 November 2009 against Liverpool F.C.

In the 2013–14 Nemzeti Bajnokság I season Ferencvárosi TC played their home matches in the stadium while their new home, Groupama Arena was under construction.
