= Playing the Angel =

2005 studio album by Depeche Mode

Studio album by Depeche Mode
- Released: 17 October 2005
- Recorded: January–July 2005
- Studios: Sound Design (Santa Barbara, California); Stratosphere Sound (New York City); Whitfield Street (London)
- Genres: Electronic rock; post-punk; synth-pop
- Length: 52:16
- Label: Mute
- Producer: Ben Hillier

Depeche Mode chronology
Remixes 81–04 (2004)	Playing the Angel (2005)	Recording the Angel (2006)

Singles from Playing the Angel
- 1. "Precious" Released: 3 October 2005; 2. "A Pain That I'm Used To" Released: 9 December 2005; 3. "Suffer Well" Released: 20 March 2006; 4. "John the Revelator" / "Lilian" Released: 4 June 2006

Playing the Angel is the eleventh studio album by the English electronic music band Depeche Mode. It was first released on 17 October 2005 by Mute Records in the United Kingdom, and a day later by Sire Records and Reprise Records in the United States. It was supported by the Touring the Angel tour and the four singles "Precious", "A Pain That I'm Used To", "Suffer Well", and "John the Revelator" / "Lilian". The album reached number one in over 10 countries and entered the top 10 in the United Kingdom and United States.

== Background and composition ==
Playing the Angel is the first Depeche Mode album to feature writing contributions from lead singer Dave Gahan. He wrote the lyrics to "Suffer Well", "I Want It All" and "Nothing's Impossible", while Christian Eigner and Andrew Phillpott wrote the music. Gahan is the lead singer on all songs except for the instrumental "Introspectre", and Martin Gore-sung tracks "Macro" and "Damaged People". Gahan also sings backing vocals on "Macro". Tracks recorded during the Playing the Angel sessions that did not make the album include "Martyr", which was originally planned to be the lead single but was eventually deemed too poppy for the album and saved for The Best of Depeche Mode Volume 1. Other songs include "Free", which ended up on the "Precious" single and the Japanese version of Playing the Angel.

Lyrically, some of the themes that appear quite often are faith, sin, pain, and suffering. Gore said that the track "John The Revelator" talks about faith but claims that "It also denounces the belief in a god who punishes and damns". Gahan explained that the origin of the track "Suffer Well" has to do with when a friend of his told him to "suffer well" (likely during his time as a substance abuser in the 1990s) and the line stuck with Gahan. Another subject that Gore wrote about was his divorce from his wife. The track "Precious" was written about how Gore's children were coping with their parents' divorce. Gore stated that "[t]he song ends with the verse 'I know you've learned to trust / keep faith in both of us'. All of our songs, even the most depressive ones, contain hope".

Musically, the album has a much more raw and gritty sound than its predecessor. Gillian Telling of Rolling Stone described the album's sound as featuring "the band's classic blend of synth-pop beats, heavy guitar riffs and dark lyrics". The album has been called a more organic record for using more analogue synths than digital ones. In addition, most of the soundscapes presented are harsher and groovier than the more mellow Exciter. Producer Ben Hillier said that the verses on opening track "A Pain That I'm Used To" were extremely difficult to get right and Gore believed that the intro was also extremely difficult. According to Hillier, the choruses came together very well. Gore also told Keyboard Magazine that he had been listening to a lot of gospel music and that it directly inspired the track "John The Revelator" though the track strays far from its inspiration. Hillier also recalled that the tracks "Suffer Well" and "The Sinner in Me" were massively changed from their original demos. "Nothing's Impossible" was also massively changed from its demo and was transformed into one of the heaviest and more distorted songs on the album. The demo version of "Nothing's Impossible" appears on the deluxe edition of Sounds of the Universe.

== Release ==
In mid-July 2005, the unfinished video for "Precious" was leaked online. It is believed to have been leaked through the website of the production team that helped make the video.

The album was released as a Copy Controlled CD and a deluxe SACD/DVD version (CD/DVD version in the United States) which includes the album on hybrid multi-channel SACD as the main disc and a bonus DVD featuring an exclusive studio performance of "Clean" (from Violator), the video for "Precious", a photo gallery and a 5.1 mix of the album. There is also a documentary on the making of the album. All ten of the earlier Depeche Mode albums were re-released in similar format to Playing the Angel, a CD/SACD hybrid (in the US simply a remastered CD) with a DVD featuring a 5.1 mix of each album and a documentary, though Playing the Angel's documentary is far less extensive and also shorter than the classic ones. The album was also released on vinyl as double LP housed in gatefold sleeve.

The iTunes deluxe edition of the album has several bonuses, including another "bare" version of a Violator track, "Waiting for the Night", and the music video for "Precious". People who placed the album on pre-order were eligible to participate in a ticket pre-sale for most Touring the Angel concerts, the first time such an offer was made by iTunes and Ticketmaster.

== Reception ==
Professional ratings
Aggregate scores
Source	Rating
Metacritic	78/100
Review scores
Source	Rating
AllMusic	4.5/5 stars
Entertainment Weekly	B
The Guardian	3/5 stars
The Independent	4/5 stars
Mojo	4/5 stars
NME	5/10
Pitchfork	7.0/10
Q	4/5 stars
Rolling Stone	2.5/5 stars
The Times	4/5 stars

=== Critical ===
Playing the Angel received generally positive reviews. E! Online and Entertainment Weekly gave the album high scores. Pitchfork gave the album a positive review, but criticized its lack of innovation. However, there are some negative reviews; Rolling Stone magazine rated the album two-and-a-half stars out of five, lower than the score received by Exciter. Playing the Angel performed relatively well on several year-end lists such as Q magazine and Playlouder. The album was ranked number 20 on E! Online's "Top 20 Albums of 2005" list and number 68 on WOXY's "Top 97 Albums of 2005". In a positive review, Pitchfork described the album as "one of those signature artifacts of the Adult Band: an album we hardly even need to review. Depeche Mode's core fans will flip for it; it's the best thing they've released in a long while". The Red Book version of the album is considered by numerous fans to be poorly mastered, relying on heavy compression to intentionally and artificially boost the output, especially when compared with the vinyl version that was mastered differently.

=== Commercial ===
Playing the Angel debuted at number six on the UK Albums Chart, selling 32,505 copies in its first week. In the United States, the album debuted at number seven on the Billboard 200 with first-week sales of 98,000 copies. Both peak chart positions were improvements on the band's previous album, Exciter, which charted at number nine and eight, respectively, although Exciter attained higher US first-week sales of 115,000 units. Playing the Angel had sold 418,000 copies in the US as of November 2007. By January 2007, the album had sold 1.6 million copies worldwide (excluding the US and Canada), according to EMI.

=== Accolades ===
Accolades for Playing the Angel
Publication	Accolade	Rank	Ref.
Eins Live	Top Albums of 2005	15	
Gaffa	Top Albums of 2005	17	
MusicServer	Top 100 Albums of the 2000s	66	
Plattentests	Top Albums of 2005	10	
Playlouder	Top 50 Albums of 2005	39	
Popnews	Top Albums of 2005	16	
Q	Top 50 Albums of 2005	34	

== Track listing ==
All lead vocals by Dave Gahan, except where noted

All tracks are written by Martin L. Gore, except where noted.

Standard edition
No.	Title	Writer(s)	Lead vocals	Length
1.	"A Pain That I'm Used To"			4:11
2.	"John the Revelator"			3:42
3.	"Suffer Well"	Gahan; Eigner; Phillpott		3:49
4.	"The Sinner in Me"			4:56
5.	"Precious"			4:10
6.	"Macro"		Gore	4:03
7.	"I Want It All"	Gahan; Eigner; Phillpott		6:09
8.	"Nothing's Impossible"	Gahan; Eigner; Phillpott		4:21
9.	"Introspectre"		instrumental	1:42
10.	"Damaged People"		Gore	3:29
11.	"Lilian"			4:49
12.	"The Darkest Star"			6:55
Total length:				52:16

iTunes Deluxe Edition
No.	Title	Length
13.	"Free"	5:13
14.	"Waiting for the Night" (Bare)	4:19
15.	"Newborn"	5:34
16.	"Newborn" (Foster Remix by Kettel)	5:28
17.	"Better Days"	2:30
18.	"Better Days" (Basteroid "Dance Is Gone" Vocal Mix)	7:13
19.	"Better Days" (Basteroid "Dance Is Gone" Remix)	7:12
Total length:		89:00

Limited edition bonus DVD
No.	Title	Length
1.	"Playing the Angel (In 5.1 and Stereo)"	52:40
2.	"Making the Angel" (short film)	8:25
3.	"Precious" (music video)	4:04
4.	"Clean" (Bare)	3:45
Total length:		121:10

- The bonus DVD also includes a photo gallery. The UMD release of the album contains the same material as the bonus DVD excluding the "5.1 and Stereo" mix of the album.

iTunes pre-order bonus track
No.	Title	Length
13.	"Waiting for the Night" (Bare)	4:19
Total length:		56:35

Japanese edition bonus track
No.	Title	Length
13.	"Free"	5:13
Total length:		57:24

== Personnel ==
Credits adapted from the liner notes of Playing the Angel.

=== Depeche Mode ===
- Andy Fletcher
- Dave Gahan
- Martin Gore

=== Additional musicians ===
- Dave McCracken – programming (all tracks); piano (track 12; miscredited to track 7 in the booklet)
- Richard Morris – programming
- Christian Eigner – original programming (tracks 3, 7, 8)
- Andrew Phillpott – original programming (tracks 3, 7, 8)

=== Technical ===
- Ben Hillier – production, mixing, engineering
- Steve Fitzmaurice – mixing at Whitfield Street Studios (London)
- Richard Morris – engineering
- Nick Sevilla – recording assistance
- Arjun Agerwala – recording assistance
- Rudyard Lee Cullers – recording assistance
- Devin Workman – recording assistance, mixing assistance
- Kt Rangnick – recording assistance, mixing assistance
- Emily Lazar – mastering at The Lodge (New York City)
- Sarah Register – mastering assistance

=== Artwork ===
- Anton Corbijn – art direction, photography, cover design
- Four5one.com – design

== Charts ==
=== Weekly charts ===
Weekly chart performance for Playing the Angel
Chart (2005)	Peak position
Australian Albums (ARIA)	45
Austrian Albums (Ö3 Austria)	1
Belgian Albums (Ultratop Flanders)	4
Belgian Albums (Ultratop Wallonia)	1
Canadian Albums (Billboard)	3
Czech Albums (ČNS IFPI)	1
Danish Albums (Hitlisten)	1
Dutch Albums (Album Top 100)	11
European Albums (Billboard)	1
Finnish Albums (Suomen virallinen lista)	1
French Albums (SNEP)	1
German Albums (Offizielle Top 100)	1
Hungarian Albums (MAHASZ)	1
Irish Albums (IRMA)	15
Italian Albums (FIMI)	1
Japanese Albums (Oricon)	104
Mexican Albums (Top 100 Mexico)	3
Norwegian Albums (VG-lista)	1
Polish Albums (ZPAV)	1
Portuguese Albums (AFP)	1
Scottish Albums (Official Charts)	9
Spanish Albums (Promusicae)	2
Swedish Albums (Sverigetopplistan)	1
Swiss Albums (Schweizer Hitparade)	1
UK Albums (Official Charts)	6
US Billboard 200	7
US Top Dance Albums (Billboard)	1

=== Year-end charts ===
2005 year-end chart performance for Playing the Angel
Chart (2005)	Position
Austrian Albums (Ö3 Austria)	54
Belgian Albums (Ultratop Flanders)	53
Belgian Albums (Ultratop Wallonia)	16
Finnish Albums (Suomen virallinen lista)	78
French Albums (SNEP)	57
German Albums (Offizielle Top 100)	22
Hungarian Albums (MAHASZ)	27
Italian Albums (FIMI)	19
Mexican Albums (Top 100 Mexico)	81
Swedish Albums (Sverigetopplistan)	40
Swedish Albums & Compilations (Sverigetopplistan)	44
Swiss Albums (Schweizer Hitparade)	30
US Top Dance/Electronic Albums (Billboard)	2

2006 year-end chart performance for Playing the Angel
Chart (2006)	Position
Belgian Albums (Ultratop Wallonia)	95
European Albums (Billboard)	54
French Albums (SNEP)	115
German Albums (Offizielle Top 100)	44
Hungarian Albums (MAHASZ)	100
Italian Albums (FIMI)	60
Mexican Albums (Top 100 Mexico)	95
US Top Dance/Electronic Albums (Billboard)	5

== Certifications and sales ==
Certifications and sales for Playing the Angel
Region	Certification	Certified units/sales
Argentina (CAPIF)	Gold	20,000^{^}
Austria (IFPI Austria)	Gold	15,000^{*}
Canada (Music Canada)	Gold	50,000^{^}
Denmark (IFPI Danmark)	Gold	20,000^{^}
Finland (Musiikkituottajat)	Gold	16,777
France (SNEP)	Platinum	200,000^{*}
Germany (BVMI)	5× Gold	500,000^{‡}
Greece (IFPI Greece)	Gold	10,000^{^}
Hungary (MAHASZ)	Platinum	10,000^{^}
Italy sales in 2005	—	168,000
Mexico (AMPROFON)	Gold	50,000^{^}
Poland (ZPAV)	Platinum	32,000
Portugal (AFP)	Gold	10,000^{^}
Russia (NFPF)	3× Platinum	60,000^{*}
Spain (Promusicae)	Platinum	100,000^{^}
Sweden (GLF)	Gold	30,000^{^}
United Kingdom (BPI)	Gold	100,000^{^}
United States	—	418,000
Summaries
Europe (IFPI)	Platinum	1,000,000^{*}
Worldwide	—	1,600,000
^{*} Sales figures based on certification alone.^{^} Shipments figures based on certification alone.

== See also ==
- List of European number-one hits of 2005
- List of number-one albums of 2005 (Poland)
- List of number-one electronic albums of 2005 (U.S.)
- List of number-one hits of 2005 (France)
- List of number-one hits of 2005 (Italy)
