= Kuruçeşme Arena =

Kuruçeşme Open Air
- Paraf Kuruçeşme Açıkhava
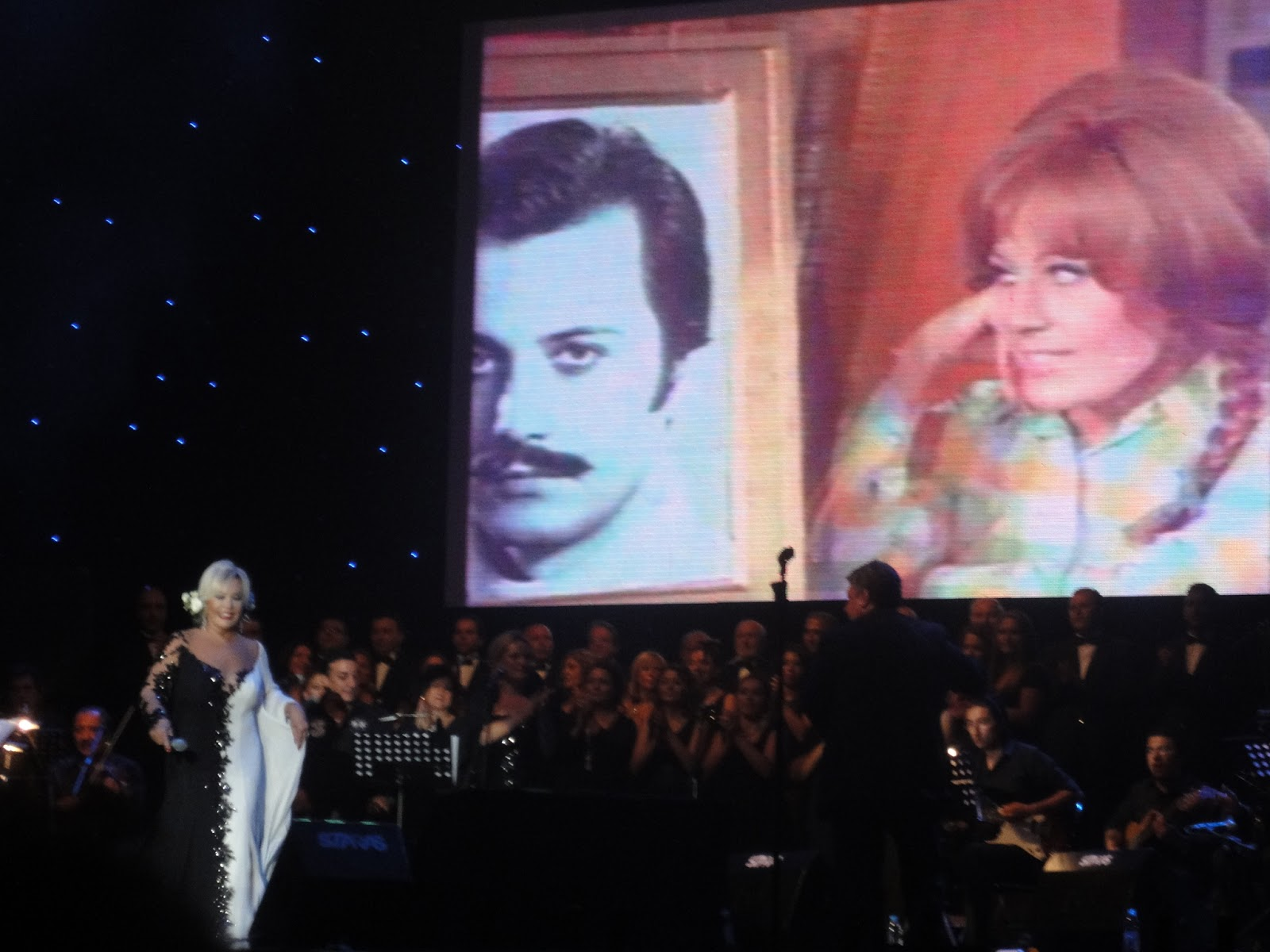
- Interactive map of Kuruçeşme Open Air
- Full name: Paraf Kuruçeşme Open Air
- Former names: Turkcell Kuruçeşme Arena (2005-2012)
- Coordinates: 41°03′07.8″N 29°02′01.1″E
- Owner: Paraf

Construction
- Opened: 2005
- Closed: 2012; 2023
- Reopened: 2021
- Demolished: 2016; 2023
- Years active: 2005-2012 (demolished); 2021-2023 (demolished)

Website
- parafkurucesmeacikhava.com

Paraf Kuruçeşme Open Air or formerly known as Turkcell Kuruçeşme Arena was an open-air music venue located at Kuruçeşme neighborhood of Beşiktaş district in Istanbul, Turkey. It was also used as an outdoor cinema. The arena, located on the coastal road between Ortaköy-Arnavutköy, could accommodate between 2,500 and 7,000 people, depending on the event.

The land of the arena, which was used as a car park before 2005, was transformed into an event area by Beşiktaş Municipality and put into service under the name Kuruçeşme Arena. The arena was inaugurated with the Pink Martini concert on 19 July 2005.

In 2012, Kuruçeşme Arena was closed for events, the same year its land was purchased by Astaş Holding, who demolished the music venue and turned into a hotel. In 2021, the arena was re-opened under new administration and in a new location, about 2 km away from the former location of the arena.

In 2023, within the framework of the 6th anniversary of the 15 July Democracy and National Unity Day, government-funded concert The Youth Never Forgets: 15 July was held at Kuruçeşme Open Air.

== Performers ==
Concerts of notable artist or music groups the venue hosted were:

- Sezen Aksu
- Anadolu Ateşi
- Funda Arar
- Yavuz Bingöl
- Murat Boz
- Patrizio Buanne
- Sibel Can
- Mustafa Ceceli
- Kenan Doğulu
- Sertab Erener
- Gülben Ergen
- Erol Evgin
- Göksel
- Macy Gray
- Ebru Gündeş
- Tom Jones
- Nil Karaibrahimgil
- Lenny Kravitz
- Zülfü Livaneli
- Enrico Macias
- Ricky Martin
- Jill Scott
- Pink Martini
- Nilüfer
- Serdar Ortaç
- Bülent Ortaçgil
- Ajda Pekkan
- Rihanna
- Emel Sayın
- Tarkan
- Kylie Minogue
- Shakira
- Daft Punk
