= Precious (Depeche Mode song) =

2005 single by Depeche Mode

Single by Depeche Mode

from the album Playing the Angel
- B-side: "Free"
- Released: 3 October 2005
- Studio: Sound Design (Santa Barbara, California)
- Genre: Synth-pop
- Length: 4:10
- Label: Mute; Sire; Reprise
- Songwriter: Martin Gore
- Producer: Ben Hillier

Depeche Mode singles chronology
"Enjoy the Silence 04" (2004)	"Precious" (2005)	"A Pain That I'm Used To" (2005)

Music video
- "Precious" on YouTube

Audio sample
- Depeche Mode – "Precious": file; help

"Precious" is a song by English electronic music band Depeche Mode from their eleventh studio album, Playing the Angel (2005). It was released on 3 October 2005 by Mute, Sire, and Reprise Records as the album's lead single. The song reached No. 4 on the UK Singles Chart, No. 71 on the US Billboard Hot 100, and No. 23 on the US Modern Rock Tracks chart. It also topped the charts in Denmark, Italy, Spain, and Sweden, and it peaked within the top 10 in Austria, Wallonia, Canada, Finland, Germany, and Norway.

== Chart performance ==
Released in the United Kingdom on 3 October 2005, "Precious" debuted at No. 4 on the UK Singles Chart, which would become its peak, and spent a total of six weeks in the top 100. As of 2026, it is the band's last top-10 single in the UK. In Ireland, on 6 October, the song first appeared at its peak of No. 12 on the Irish Singles Chart. It was a chart-topper across mainland Europe, debuting at the top position in Italy and Spain and rising to No. 1 in Denmark, Hungary, and Sweden. On the Eurochart Hot 100, "Precious" reached No. 4, peaking within the top 10 in Austria, Finland, Germany, Greece, Norway, and the Wallonia region of Belgium. In the Czech Republic, France, the Netherlands, Switzerland, and the Flanders region of Belgium, it entered the top 40.

In the United States, where "Precious" was serviced to radio on 26 September 2005, the song debuted at No. 99 on the Billboard Hot 100 and rose its highest position, No. 71, the following issue, 7 November 2005. It spent only one more week on the Hot 100, at No. 80, before leaving the listing. The single found better success on the Billboard dance charts, topping both the Hot Dance Club Play and Hot Dance Singles Sales rankings on 29 October 2005. It additionally found peaks of No. 6 on the Adult Alternative Songs chart, No. 23 on the Modern Rock Tracks chart, and No. 32 on the Adult Top 40. On the Canadian Singles Chart, the record reached No. 2 and remained on the listing for 12 weeks.

== B-sides ==
"Free" is the B-side to "Precious". It's a techno beat with an old school feel. It was unavailable in the US, aside from importing, but is now available on iTunes. It also appears as a bonus track on the Japanese version of Playing the Angel. There is no remix of the song, aside from an early version that was heard at the Touring the Angel press conference, as shown on the Playing the Angel Electronic Press Kit, however, the full/stand-alone version is not available for download or purchase at this time.

== Track listing ==
UK and European CD single

1. "Precious" (album version) – 4:10
2. "Precious" (Sasha's Spooky mix single edit) – 5:45

European limited 7-inch picture disc

A. "Precious" (album version)
B. "Precious" (Michael Mayer Ambient mix)

European 12-inch single

A. "Precious" (Sasha's Spooky mix full length) – 10:32
AA. "Precious" (Sasha's Gargantuan vocal mix full length) – 9:40

European enhanced CD single

1. "Precious" (album version)
2. "Free"
3. "Precious" (video)

European maxi-CD single

1. "Precious (Sasha's Gargantuan vocal mix edit) – 7:11
2. "Precious (Misc. full vocal mix) – 5:44
3. "Free – 5:12

US and Canadian maxi-CD single

1. "Precious (Sasha's Spooky mix) – 7:33
2. "Precious (Sasha's Gargantuan vocal mix) – 7:10
3. "Precious (Michael Mayer Balearic mix) – 7:18
4. "Precious (Misc. full vocal mix) – 5:41
5. "Precious (Misc. Crunch mix) – 6:51
6. "Precious (Motor mix) – 6:37

US digital download (radio version)

1. "Precious" (US radio version) – 4:07
2. "Free" – 5:10

DVD single

1. "Precious" (video)
2. "Precious" (Motor remix)
3. "Precious" (Michael Mayer Ambient mix)

== Personnel ==
Personnel are lifted from the UK CD single liner notes.

- Martin L. Gore – writing
- Ben Hillier – production, mixing, engineering
- Steve Fitzmaurice – mixing
- Dave McCracken – programming
- Richard Morris – programming, engineering
- Anton Corbijn – art direction, photography, cover design

== Charts ==
=== Weekly charts ===
Weekly chart performance for "Precious"
Chart (2005–2007)	Peak position
Austria (Ö3 Austria Top 40)	9
Belgium (Ultratop 50 Flanders)	26
Belgium (Ultratop 50 Wallonia)	4
Canada (Nielsen SoundScan)	2
Canada Hot AC Top 30 (Radio & Records)	16
CIS Airplay (TopHit)	14
Czech Republic Airplay (ČNS IFPI)	27
Denmark (Tracklisten)	1
Europe (Eurochart Hot 100)	4
Finland (Suomen virallinen lista)	2
France (SNEP)	32
Germany (GfK)	2
Greece (IFPI)	6
Hungary (Rádiós Top 40)	4
Hungary (Dance Top 40)	9
Hungary (Single Top 40)	1
Ireland (IRMA)	12
Italy (FIMI)	1
Netherlands (Dutch Top 40)	24
Netherlands (Single Top 100)	11
Norway (VG-lista)	4
Russia Airplay (TopHit)	14
Scottish Singles Sales (Official Charts)	4
Spain (Promusicae)	1
Sweden (Sverigetopplistan)	1
Switzerland (Schweizer Hitparade)	12
UK Singles (Official Charts)	4
Ukraine Airplay (TopHit)	73
US Billboard Hot 100	71
US Adult Alternative Airplay (Billboard)	6
US Adult Pop Airplay (Billboard)	32
US Alternative Airplay (Billboard)	23
US Dance Club Songs (Billboard)	1
US Dance Singles Sales (Billboard)	1

=== Year-end charts ===
2005 year-end chart performance for "Precious"
Chart (2005)	Position
Belgium (Ultratop 50 Wallonia)	60
CIS Airplay (TopHit)	64
Europe (Eurochart Hot 100)	52
Germany (Media Control GfK)	54
Hungary (Rádiós Top 40)	64
Italy (FIMI)	10
Russia Airplay (TopHit)	59
Spain (PROMUSICAE)	7
Sweden (Hitlistan)	37
UK Singles (OCC)	159
US Dance Club Play (Billboard)	24
US Dance Singles Sales (Billboard)	12

2006 year-end chart performance for "Precious"
Chart (2006)	Position
CIS Airplay (TopHit)	125
Russia Airplay (TopHit)	111

=== Decade-end charts ===
Decade-end chart performance for "Precious"
Chart (2000–2009)	Position
Russia Airplay (TopHit)	195

== Certifications and sales ==
Certifications and sales for "Precious"
Region	Certification	Certified units/sales
Germany (BVMI)	Gold	150,000^{‡}
Italy	—	15,000
United States (RIAA)	Gold	500,000^{‡}
^{‡} Sales+streaming figures based on certification alone.

== Release history ==
Release dates and formats for "Precious"
Region	Date	Format(s)	Label(s)	Ref.
United States	26 September 2005	Hot adult contemporary; triple A radio	Mute; Sire; Reprise	
United States	3 October 2005	Digital download	Mute; Sire; Reprise	
United Kingdom	3 October 2005	CD	Mute	
Australia	17 October 2005	Vinyl; CD	Mute	

== See also ==
- List of number-one hits of 2005 (Denmark)
- List of number-one hits of 2005 (Italy)
- List of number-one singles of 2005 (Spain)
- List of number-one singles of 2005 (Sweden)
- List of Billboard Hot Dance Club Play number ones of 2005
