= Heineken Jammin' Festival =

Live rock festival in Milan, Italy

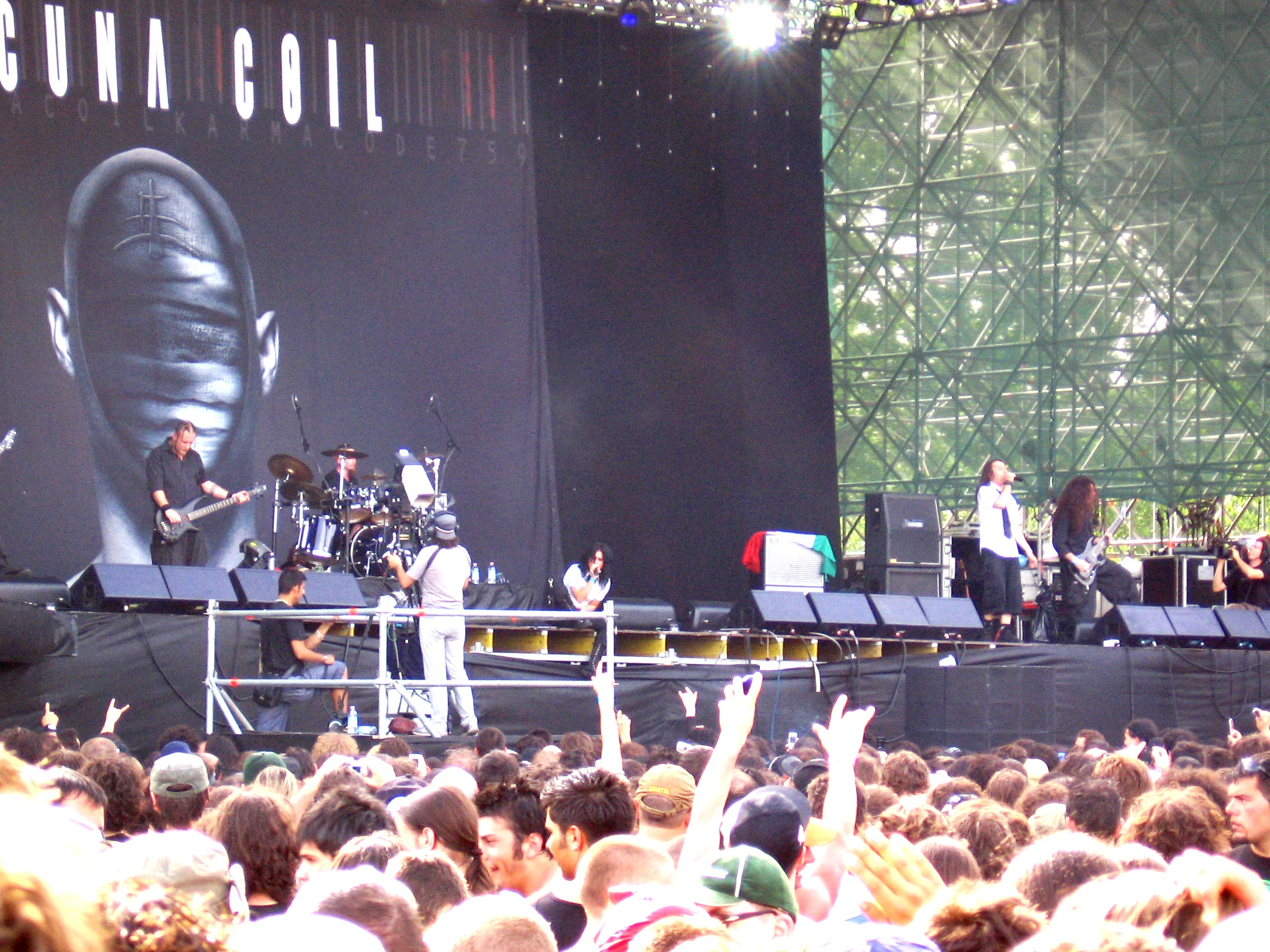
Lacuna Coil live at the Heineken Jamming Festival 2006

Heineken Jammin' Festival is a large live rock festival in Milan, Italy featuring international and Italian rock acts.

It started in mid-June 1998 at the Imola Autodrome and has attracted attendances of more than 100,000 over the course of the three-day event. For the tenth anniversary of the festival in 2007, the location changed to Venice, Parco San Giuliano.

Some of the featured acts have included Vasco Rossi, Depeche Mode, R.E.M., Robbie Williams, Thirty Seconds to Mars, Lacuna Coil, Red Hot Chili Peppers, Garbage, Bon Jovi, Metallica, Iron Maiden, Marilyn Manson, Santana, Oasis, Green Day, Pixies, Lenny Kravitz, The Cure, and Chemical Brothers.

== 2011 ==
Headlining acts: Coldplay, Negramaro, Vasco Rossi, Noemi, Beady Eye, Cesare Cremonini, The Pretty Reckless and others.

== 2010 ==
Headlining acts: Aerosmith, Thirty Seconds to Mars, Pearl Jam. Green Day's performance was cancelled because of a heavy storm that caused damage to the stage and flooded the area. The band stayed long after to see if they could get out and play for their fans but the local authorities said that it wasn't safe.

== 2008 ==
Headlining acts were Linkin Park, Sex Pistols, Vasco Rossi and the Police

== 2007 wind ==
In the afternoon of 15 June 2007, while Le Mani were playing, a strong downburst hit the park. Six steel towers supporting the PA system collapsed and 25 people were injured, and a young woman was crushed to death. The festival stages and equipment were also damaged, and the organizers were forced to cancel the performances of My Chemical Romance, Linkin Park, The Killers and Pearl Jam. The police took control of the festival area and the festival was cancelled.
