= A Pain That I'm Used To =

2005 single by Depeche Mode

Single by Depeche Mode

from the album Playing the Angel
- B-side: "Newborn"
- Released: 12 December 2005
- Studio: Sound Design (Santa Barbara, California)
- Length: 4:11 (album version); 3:23 (radio edit 1); 3:27 (radio edit 2)
- Label: Mute
- Songwriter: Martin Gore
- Producer: Ben Hillier

Depeche Mode singles chronology
"Precious" (2005)	"A Pain That I'm Used To" (2005)	"Suffer Well" (2006)

Music video
- "A Pain That I'm Used To" on YouTube

"A Pain That I'm Used To" is a song by English electronic music band Depeche Mode. It is the opening track on their eleventh studio album, Playing the Angel (2005). It was released as the album's second single on 12 December 2005 through Mute Records.

== Background ==
The single contains remixes by Goldfrapp and Jacques Lu Cont (Stuart Price). There are also two radio versions.

Although "Better Days" was mentioned to be the B-side for the single in its press release, it ended up being a track called "Newborn" when the track listings were released. "Better Days" went on to be the B-side to the following single, "Suffer Well". "Newborn" is a slow song that transforms into a harder song during the chorus.

The single was only physically released in the UK. The US only had a digital release (i.e., iTunes). The song reached number 15 upon UK release. In the US, the song debuted at number 45 on the Hot Dance Music/Club Play chart on 14 January 2006. It eventually reached number 6.

The track is one of the few Depeche Mode songs to feature a real bass, which is played by Andy Fletcher.

== Track listing ==
7-inch: Picture disc / Bong36 (EU)

1. "A Pain That I'm Used To" (Goldfrapp remix) – 4:39
2. "Newborn" (Foster remix by Kettel) – 5:26

12-inch: Mute / 12Bong36 (EU)

1. "A Pain That I'm Used To" (Jacques Lu Cont remix) – 7:51
2. "A Pain That I'm Used To" (Jacques Lu Cont dub) – 8:00

12-inch: Mute / L12Bong36 (EU)

1. "A Pain That I'm Used To" (Bitstream Threshold mix) – 6:07
2. "A Pain That I'm Used To" (Bitstream Spansule mix) – 7:21

CD: Mute / CDBong36 (EU)

1. "A Pain That I'm Used To" – 4:11
2. "Newborn" – 5:34

CD: Mute / LCDBong36 (EU)

1. "A Pain That I'm Used To" (Jacques Lu Cont remix) – 7:51
2. "A Pain That I'm Used To" (Jacques Lu Cont dub) – 8:00
3. "A Pain That I'm Used To" (Goldfrapp remix) – 4:39
4. "A Pain That I'm Used To" (Bitstream Spansule mix) – 7:22
5. "A Pain That I'm Used To" (Telex remix) – 3:28

DVD: Mute / DVDBong36 (EU)

1. "A Pain That I'm Used To" (video) – 3:49
2. "A Pain That I'm Used To" (exclusive behind the scenes footage) – 3:52
3. "Newborn" (Foster remix by Kettel) – 5:26

Digital downloads

1. "A Pain That I'm Used To" (Telex club mix) – 5:49
2. "A Pain That I'm Used To" (Telex remix 2) – 3:26
3. "A Pain That I'm Used To" (Bitstream Spansule mix edit) – 4:15
4. "A Pain That I'm Used To" (Bitstream Threshold mix edit) – 4:04
5. "A Pain That I'm Used To" (Jacques Lu Cont remix edit) – 4:47

== Charts ==
Weekly chart performance for "A Pain That I'm Used To"
Chart (2005–2006)	Peak position
Austria (Ö3 Austria Top 40)	24
Belgium (Ultratip Bubbling Under Flanders)	3
Belgium (Ultratop 50 Wallonia)	20
Denmark (Tracklisten)	3
Finland (Suomen virallinen lista)	15
France (SNEP)	96
Germany (GfK)	11
Greece (IFPI)	12
Hungary (Mahasz)	1
Italy (FIMI)	2
Netherlands (Dutch Top 40 Tipparade)	6
Netherlands (Single Top 100)	27
Spain (PROMUSICAE)	1
Sweden (Sverigetopplistan)	13
Switzerland (Schweizer Hitparade)	23
UK Singles (Official Charts)	15
US Billboard Hot Dance Club Play	6
