= Suffer Well =

2006 single by Depeche Mode

Single by Depeche Mode

from the album Playing the Angel
- B-side: "Better Days"
- Released: 27 March 2006
- Studio: Sound Design (Santa Barbara, California)
- Genre: Electronica
- Length: 3:49
- Label: Mute
- Composers: Christian Eigner; Andrew Phillpott
- Lyricist: Dave Gahan
- Producers: Ben Hillier; Depeche Mode

Depeche Mode singles chronology
"A Pain That I'm Used To" (2005)	"Suffer Well" (2006)	"John the Revelator" / "Lilian" (2006)

Music video
- "Suffer Well" on YouTube

"Suffer Well" is a song by English electronic music band Depeche Mode from their eleventh studio album, Playing the Angel (2005). It was released in the United Kingdom on 27 March 2006 as the album's third single.

== Background ==
"Suffer Well" is the first Depeche Mode single written by lead singer Dave Gahan and their first single not written by Martin Gore since "Just Can't Get Enough" in 1981, which was written by Vince Clarke. It is also the first Depeche Mode single that was co-written with non-Depeche Mode members (Christian Eigner and Andrew Phillpott wrote the music).

The song is based on an experience that Gahan had where he was told by a friend of his to 'suffer well' while he was discussing his life and issues. The line had stuck to him, which inspired the idea of the song. He explained on M6's TV show Focus Rock, "The song is about, in, what you believe to be suffering, is where you grow and learn about yourself." In the same interview he also states that the song was originally much slower in pace, but it was decided to go on to a more pop oriented route.

The B-sides for the single are called "Better Days", a short song with an industrial-punk feel to it, and "The Darkest Star", which entered the national singles charts in Finland for one week, at number 16.

The song "Suffer Well" was nominated in the category of "Best Dance Recording" at the 2007 Grammy Awards but lost to Justin Timberlake's "SexyBack". The single version of the song adds a drum track to the song and is shorter.

== Chart performance ==
"Suffer Well" reached number 38 on the US Billboard Modern Rock Tracks chart. It reached number one on the Dance Club Play chart, the band's seventh song to top this chart. "Suffer Well" was added to the playlist of Xfm London on 27 February 2006. However, it failed to make the playlist of any BBC Radio station. Despite this, it entered the UK charts at number 12.

== Music video ==
The video was filmed by Anton Corbijn and was his first music video for the band, excluding tour projections and promo videos, since "Useless" in 1997.

The video features a cameo appearance by Gahan's wife, Jennifer, once as the angel and once as herself. Another cameo is by the band's manager, Jonathan Kessler, who plays Gahan's limo driver. Other highlights include Gore as a bride and Fletcher as a groom. It also features the disco ball seen in the cover art of "Suffer Well".

== Track listing ==
UK limited-edition 7-inch picture disc

A. "Suffer Well" (Metope vocal remix)
B. "The Darkest Star" (Monolake remix)

UK 12-inch single

A1. "Suffer Well" (Tiga remix) – 6:28
A2. "Suffer Well" (Tiga dub) – 5:29
B1. "Suffer Well" (Narcotic Thrust vocal dub) – 6:44

UK limited-edition 12-inch single

A1. "Suffer Well" (Metope remix) – 6:53
A2. "Suffer Well" (Metope vocal remix) – 6:28
B1. "Suffer Well" (M83 remix) – 4:31
B2. "Better Days" (Basteroid 'Dance Is Gone' vocal mix) – 7:09

UK extra limited-edition 12-inch single

A. "The Darkest Star" (Holden remix) – 7:47
AA. "The Darkest Star" (Holden dub) – 7:56

UK and European CD single

1. "Suffer Well" – 3:50
2. "Better Days" – 2:28

UK limited-edition CD single and US digital download

1. "Suffer Well" (Tiga remix) – 6:30
2. "Suffer Well" (Narcotic Thrust vocal dub) – 6:42
3. "Suffer Well" (Alter Ego remix) – 6:09
4. "Suffer Well" (M83 remix) – 4:34
5. "Suffer Well" (Metope vocal remix) – 6:28
6. "Suffer Well" (Metope remix) – 6:52

UK DVD single

1. "Suffer Well" (video) – 3:50
2. "Suffer Well" (Alter Ego dub) (audio) – 8:53
3. "Better Days" (Basteroid 'Dance Is Gone' vocal mix) (audio) – 7:09

== Charts ==
=== Weekly charts ===
Weekly chart performance for "Suffer Well"
Chart (2006)	Peak position
Austria (Ö3 Austria Top 40)	67
Belgium (Ultratip Bubbling Under Flanders)	7
Belgium (Ultratop 50 Wallonia)	39
Czech Republic Airplay (ČNS IFPI)	67
Denmark (Tracklisten)	1
Europe (Eurochart Hot 100)	15
Finland (Suomen virallinen lista)	6
France (SNEP)	87
Germany (GfK)	13
Hungary (Single Top 40)	1
Ireland (IRMA)	18
Italy (FIMI)	5
Scottish Singles Sales (Official Charts)	10
Spain (Promusicae)	2
Sweden (Sverigetopplistan)	20
Switzerland (Schweizer Hitparade)	66
UK Singles (Official Charts)	12
US Alternative Airplay (Billboard)	38
US Dance Club Songs (Billboard)	1

=== Year-end charts ===
Year-end chart performance for "Suffer Well"
Chart (2006)	Position
US Dance Club Play (Billboard)	34

== Release history ==
Release dates and formats for "Suffer Well"
Region	Date	Format(s)	Label(s)	Ref.
United Kingdom	27 March 2006	CD; DVD; digital download	Mute	
Australia	17 April 2006	7-inch vinyl; 12-inch vinyl	Mute	

== See also ==
- List of Billboard Hot Dance Club Play number ones of 2006
