= Global Spirit Tour =

2017–18 concert tour by Depeche Mode

- Tour by Depeche Mode
- Promotional poster for the tour
- Location: Europe; North America; Latin America
- Associated album: Spirit
- Start date: 5 May 2017
- End date: 25 July 2018
- Legs: 6
- No. of shows: 85 in Europe; 40 in North America; 5 in Latin America; 130 in total
- Box office: $202 million

Depeche Mode concert chronology
- The Delta Machine Tour (2013–14); Global Spirit Tour (2017–18); Memento Mori World Tour (2023–24)

The Global Spirit Tour was a 2017–18 worldwide concert tour by English electronic music band Depeche Mode in support of the group's 14th studio album, Spirit. During the summer 2017, the band played to more than 3 million fans in total. This is the last concert tour to feature keyboardist Andy Fletcher before his death in 2022.

The tour found the band continuing their charity partnership with Swiss watchmaker Hublot, raising money and awareness for Charity: Water toward its mission of providing safe drinking water to everyone in the world. To promote their worldwide tour, Depeche Mode gave a promotional concert at the Funkhaus Berlin on 17 March in front of 1000 fans and streamed live on the internet.

With 130 live shows, the Global Spirit Tour is Depeche Mode's longest tour. Previously, the longest one was the Touring the Angel, with 124 live shows.

== Setlist ==
Setlist for European and U.S. promo and rehearsal shows

1. "Scum"
2. "Going Backwards"
3. "So Much Love"
4. "Corrupt"
5. "A Pain That I'm Used To" (Jacques Lu Cont's remix)
6. "World in My Eyes"
7. "Cover Me"
  - "World in My Eyes"
8. Song performed by Martin Gore
  - "Little Soul" (acoustic)
  - "Home"
9. "Where's the Revolution"
10. "Barrel of a Gun"
11. "Enjoy the Silence"
12. "Walking in My Shoes" (with bits from the 'Random Carpet' mix)
  - "Barrel of a Gun"
13. "Personal Jesus"
  - "Enjoy the Silence"

Setlist for Europe (leg #1) and North America (leg #2)

1. "Going Backwards"
2. "So Much Love"
  - "Policy of Truth"
  - "It's No Good"
3. "Barrel of a Gun" (including a verse of Grandmaster Flash and the Furious Five's "The Message")
4. "A Pain That I'm Used To" (Jacques Lu Cont's remix)
5. "Corrupt"
  - "Useless"
6. "In Your Room" (album version)
  - "Precious"
7. "World in My Eyes"
8. "Cover Me"
9. Song performed by Martin Gore
  - "A Question of Lust" (acoustic)
  - "Home"
  - "Judas" (acoustic)
  - "Shake the Disease" (acoustic)
  - "Somebody"
  - "Strangelove" (acoustic)
  - "Insight" (acoustic)
  - "Sister of Night (acoustic)
10. Song performed by Martin Gore
  - "A Question of Lust" (acoustic)
  - "Home"
11. "Poison Heart"
  - "In Your Room" (album version)
  - "Policy of Truth"
  - "Precious"
12. "Where's the Revolution"
13. "Wrong"
14. "Everything Counts"
15. "Stripped"
  - "Black Celebration"
16. "Enjoy the Silence"
17. "Never Let Me Down Again"
18. Song performed by Martin Gore
  - "Home"
  - "Judas" (acoustic)
  - "Somebody"
  - "Strangelove" (acoustic)
  - "Shake the Disease" (acoustic)
  - "But Not Tonight" (acoustic, only performed once)
19. "Walking in My Shoes" (with bits from the 'Random Carpet' mix)
20. "Heroes" (David Bowie cover)
  - "Black Celebration"
  - "Policy of Truth"
21. "I Feel You"
22. "Personal Jesus"

Setlist for Europe (leg #3), Latin (leg #4) and North America (leg #5)

1. "Going Backwards"
2. "It's No Good"
  - "So Much Love"
3. "Barrel of a Gun" (including a verse of Grandmaster Flash and the Furious Five's "The Message")
4. "A Pain That I'm Used To" (Jacques Lu Cont's remix)
5. "Useless"
6. "Precious"
  - "In Your Room" (album version)
7. "World in My Eyes"
8. "Cover Me"
9. Song performed by Martin Gore
  - "A Question of Lust" (acoustic)
  - "Insight" (acoustic)
  - "Sister of Night" (acoustic)
  - "Judas" (acoustic)
  - "The Things You Said"
10. Song performed by Martin Gore
  - "Home" (acoustic intro)
11. "In Your Room" (album version)
  - "Precious"
12. "Where's the Revolution"
  - "Policy of Truth"
  - "Wrong"
13. "Everything Counts"
14. "Stripped"
  - "Halo"
  - "Policy of Truth"
  - "Black Celebration"
15. "Enjoy the Silence"
16. "Never Let Me Down Again"
17. Song performed by Martin Gore
  - "Judas" (acoustic)
  - "Strangelove" (acoustic)
  - "I Want You Now" (acoustic)
  - "Somebody"
18. "Walking in My Shoes" (with bits from the 'Random Carpet' mix)
  - "Policy of Truth"
19. "A Question of Time"
20. "Heroes" (David Bowie cover) (only performed at final show)
  - "I Feel You"
21. "Personal Jesus"
22. "Just Can't Get Enough" (only performed at final show)

Setlist for European festival concerts (leg #6)

1. "Going Backwards"
2. "It's No Good"
3. "A Pain That I'm Used To" (Jacques Lu Cont's remix)
4. "Precious"
  - "Useless"
5. "Policy of Truth"
  - "Precious"
6. "World in My Eyes"
7. "Cover Me"
8. Song performed by Martin Gore
  - "The Things You Said"
  - "Somebody"
9. "In Your Room" (album version)
10. "Everything Counts"
11. "Stripped"
  - "Enjoy the Silence"
12. "Personal Jesus"
13. "Never Let Me Down Again"
14. Song performed by Martin Gore
  - "Somebody"
15. "Walking in My Shoes" (with bits from the 'Random Carpet' mix)
16. "Enjoy the Silence"
17. "Just Can't Get Enough"

== Shows ==
List of concerts, showing date, city, country, venue, opening acts, tickets sold, number of available tickets and amount of gross revenue
Date	City	Country	Venue	Opening act(s)	Attendance / Capacity	Revenue
Europe
5 May 2017	Stockholm	Sweden	Friends Arena	The Raveonettes	36,400 / 36,400	$2,734,164
7 May 2017	Amsterdam	Netherlands	Ziggo Dome	The Raveonettes	16,431 / 16,431	$1,351,102
9 May 2017	Antwerp	Belgium	Sportpaleis	The Raveonettes	20,195 / 20,195	$1,477,132
12 May 2017	Nice	France	Stade Charles-Ehrmann	The Raveonettes	18,896 / 18,896	$1,320,285
14 May 2017	Ljubljana	Slovenia	Arena Stožice	The Raveonettes	10,470 / 10,470	$678,768
17 May 2017	Athens	Greece	Terra Vibe Park	The Raveonettes	17,600 / 17,600	$579,949
20 May 2017	Bratislava	Slovakia	Štadión Pasienky	F.O.X. The Raveonettes	30,290 / 30,290	$1,710,494
22 May 2017	Budapest	Hungary	Groupama Arena	F.O.X. The Raveonettes	25,200 / 25,200	$1,497,545
24 May 2017	Prague	Czech Republic	Eden Arena	F.O.X. The Raveonettes	31,935 / 31,935	$2,062,152
27 May 2017	Leipzig	Germany	Festwiese	F.O.X. The Raveonettes	70,002 / 70,002	$5,199,680
29 May 2017	Lille	France	Stade Pierre-Mauroy	The Horrors	26,113 / 26,113	$1,856,343
31 May 2017	Copenhagen	Denmark	Telia Parken	The Horrors	42,023 / 42,023	$3,841,913
3 June 2017	London	England	London Stadium	The Horrors	65,191 / 65,191	$5,263,537
5 June 2017	Cologne	Germany	RheinEnergieStadion	The Horrors	42,032 / 42,032	$3,536,347
7 June 2017	Dresden	Germany	Ostragehege	The Horrors	27,807 / 27,807	$2,189,092
9 June 2017	Munich	Germany	Olympiastadion	The Horrors	60,066 / 60,066	$5,023,935
11 June 2017	Hanover	Germany	HDI Arena	Algiers	73,050 / 73,050	$6,216,182
12 June 2017	Hanover	Germany	HDI Arena	Algiers	73,050 / 73,050	$6,216,182
18 June 2017	Zürich	Switzerland	Letzigrund	Algiers	29,575 / 29,575	$3,267,648
20 June 2017	Frankfurt	Germany	Commerzbank-Arena	Algiers	41,483 / 41,483	$3,417,345
22 June 2017	Berlin	Germany	Olympiastadion	Algiers	68,157 / 68,157	$5,646,356
25 June 2017	Rome	Italy	Stadio Olimpico	Algiers	51,845 / 51,845	$3,498,856
27 June 2017	Milan	Italy	San Siro	Algiers	54,488 / 54,488	$3,440,506
29 June 2017	Bologna	Italy	Stadio Renato Dall'Ara	Algiers	40,198 / 40,198	$2,502,572
1 July 2017	Saint-Denis	France	Stade de France	Algiers	58,199 / 58,199	$4,664,546
4 July 2017	Gelsenkirchen	Germany	Veltins-Arena	Algiers	43,064 / 43,064	$3,564,990
6 July 2017 (Note: The concert on 6 July 2017 in Bilbao was part of the Bilbao BBK Live festival.)	Bilbao	Spain	Monte Cobetas	—N/a	—N/a	—N/a
8 July 2017 (Note: The concert on 8 July 2017 in Oeiras was part of the NOS Alive festival.)	Oeiras	Portugal	Passeio Marítimo de Algés	—N/a	—N/a	—N/a
13 July 2017	Saint Petersburg	Russia	Saint Petersburg Sports and Concert Complex	Maya Jane Coles	21,864 / 21,864	$1,667,443
15 July 2017	Moscow	Russia	Otkrytiye Arena	Maya Jane Coles	36,173 / 36,173	$2,704,614
19 July 2017	Kyiv	Ukraine	NSC Olympiyskiy Stadium	Maya Jane Coles	30,803 / 30,803	$1,367,171
21 July 2017	Warsaw	Poland	PGE Narodowy	Maya Jane Coles	54,659 / 54,659	$3,298,835
23 July 2017	Cluj-Napoca	Romania	Cluj Arena	Maya Jane Coles	31,923 / 31,923	$1,420,917
North America
23 August 2017	West Valley City	United States	USANA Amphitheatre	Warpaint	15,546 / 20,000	$810,438
25 August 2017	Denver	United States	Pepsi Center	Warpaint	11,669 / 14,852	$1,191,532
27 August 2017	Clarkston	United States	DTE Energy Music Theatre	Warpaint	13,089 / 14,877	$760,468
30 August 2017	Tinley Park	United States	Hollywood Casino Amphitheatre	Warpaint	17,951 / 28,628	$1,276,697
1 September 2017	Uncasville	United States	Mohegan Sun Arena	Warpaint	6,292 / 6,911	$700,478
3 September 2017	Toronto	Canada	Air Canada Centre	Warpaint	14,863 / 15,000	$1,586,056
5 September 2017	Montreal	Canada	Bell Centre	Warpaint	14,378 / 15,151	$1,193,011
7 September 2017	Washington, D.C.	United States	Capital One Arena	Warpaint	11,957 / 12,554	$1,286,642
9 September 2017	New York City	United States	Madison Square Garden	Warpaint	28,713 / 28,713	$3,891,636
11 September 2017	New York City	United States	Madison Square Garden	Warpaint	28,713 / 28,713	$3,891,636
15 September 2017	Miami	United States	American Airlines Arena	Warpaint	12,858 / 13,123	$1,258,102
18 September 2017	Nashville	United States	Ascend Amphitheater	Warpaint	6,552 / 6,821	$474,814
20 September 2017	Austin	United States	Austin360 Amphitheater	Warpaint	12,124 / 12,571	$809,104
22 September 2017	Dallas	United States	Starplex Pavilion	Warpaint	17,010 / 20,042	$1,192,434
24 September 2017	The Woodlands	United States	Cynthia Woods Mitchell Pavilion	Warpaint	15,720 / 16,217	$1,174,677
27 September 2017	Phoenix	United States	Ak-Chin Pavilion	Warpaint	11,521 / 18,961	$631,959
30 September 2017	Paradise	United States	T-Mobile Arena	Warpaint	14,114 / 15,096	$1,578,470
2 October 2017	Santa Barbara	United States	Santa Barbara Bowl	Warpaint	4,744 / 4,744	$566,569
6 October 2017	Chula Vista	United States	Mattress Firm Amphitheatre	Warpaint	18,895 / 20,500	$1,234,035
8 October 2017	San Jose	United States	SAP Center	Warpaint	12,990 / 15,000	$1,421,010
10 October 2017	Oakland	United States	Oracle Arena	Warpaint	12,860 / 12,860	$1,493,298
12 October 2017	Los Angeles	United States	Hollywood Bowl	Warpaint	65,808 / 65,808	$7,446,382
14 October 2017	Los Angeles	United States	Hollywood Bowl	Warpaint	65,808 / 65,808	$7,446,382
16 October 2017	Los Angeles	United States	Hollywood Bowl	Warpaint	65,808 / 65,808	$7,446,382
18 October 2017	Los Angeles	United States	Hollywood Bowl	Warpaint	65,808 / 65,808	$7,446,382
21 October 2017	Seattle	United States	KeyArena	Warpaint	12,675 / 14,000	$1,316,320
23 October 2017	Portland	United States	Moda Center	Warpaint	12,589 / 14,000	$1,135,075
25 October 2017	Vancouver	Canada	Rogers Arena	Warpaint	12,308 / 14,000	$1,040,893
27 October 2017	Edmonton	Canada	Rogers Place	Warpaint	12,127 / 13,000	$1,020,953
Europe
15 November 2017	Dublin	Ireland	3Arena	Re-TROS	12,420 / 12,420	$1,306,691
17 November 2017	Manchester	England	Manchester Arena	Re-TROS	13,302 / 14,595	$1,189,204
19 November 2017	Birmingham	England	Arena Birmingham	Re-TROS	13,212 / 13,212	$1,163,368
22 November 2017	London	England	The O_{2} Arena	Re-TROS	17,366 / 19,151	$1,446,430
24 November 2017	Frankfurt	Germany	Festhalle	Re-TROS	12,004 / 12,004	$1,133,625
26 November 2017	Antwerp	Belgium	Sportpaleis	Re-TROS	19,299 / 19,299	$1,544,331
28 November 2017	Stuttgart	Germany	Hanns-Martin-Schleyer-Halle	Re-TROS	13,074 / 13,074	$1,110,491
30 November 2017	Mannheim	Germany	SAP Arena	Re-TROS	11,432 / 11,432	$958,676
3 December 2017	Paris	France	AccorHotels Arena	Re-TROS	31,922 / 31,922	$2,423,414
5 December 2017	Paris	France	AccorHotels Arena	Re-TROS	31,922 / 31,922	$2,423,414
7 December 2017	Barcelona	Spain	Palau Sant Jordi	Re-TROS	16,632 / 16,632	$1,458,459
9 December 2017	Turin	Italy	PalaAlpitour	Pumarosa	22,567 / 22,567	$1,649,451
11 December 2017	Turin	Italy	PalaAlpitour	Pumarosa	22,567 / 22,567	$1,649,451
13 December 2017	Casalecchio di Reno	Italy	Unipol Arena	Pumarosa	14,001 / 14,001	$1,025,253
16 December 2017	Madrid	Spain	WiZink Center	Pumarosa	15,188 / 15,188	$1,532,894
9 January 2018	Copenhagen	Denmark	Royal Arena	Pumarosa	15,461 / 15,461	$1,685,424
11 January 2018	Hamburg	Germany	Barclaycard Arena Hamburg	Pumarosa	13,093 / 13,093	$1,269,460
13 January 2018	Amsterdam	Netherlands	Ziggo Dome	Pumarosa	16,309 / 16,309	$1,529,315
15 January 2018	Cologne	Germany	Lanxess Arena	Pumarosa	16,327 / 16,327	$1,547,700
17 January 2018	Berlin	Germany	Mercedes-Benz Arena	EMA	27,958 / 27,958	$2,729,278
19 January 2018	Berlin	Germany	Mercedes-Benz Arena	EMA	27,958 / 27,958	$2,729,278
21 January 2018	Nuremberg	Germany	Arena Nürnberger Versicherung	EMA	8,749 / 8,749	$918,799
24 January 2018	Bordeaux	France	Bordeaux Métropole Arena	EMA	10,602 / 10,602	$1,005,765
27 January 2018	Assago	Italy	Mediolanum Forum	EMA	21,750 / 21,750	$1,701,295
29 January 2018	Assago	Italy	Mediolanum Forum	EMA	21,750 / 21,750	$1,701,295
31 January 2018	Prague	Czech Republic	O_{2} Arena	EMA	17,431 / 17,431	$1,243,489
2 February 2018	Budapest	Hungary	Budapest Sports Arena	EMA	13,799 / 13,799	$1,127,679
4 February 2018	Vienna	Austria	Wiener Stadthalle	EMA	13,166 / 13,166	$1,301,431
7 February 2018	Kraków	Poland	Tauron Arena	Black Line	15,390 / 15,390	$1,273,384
9 February 2018	Łódź	Poland	Atlas Arena	Black Line	14,270 / 14,270	$1,279,492
11 February 2018	Gdańsk	Poland	Ergo Arena	Black Line	13,326 / 13,326	$1,104,971
13 February 2018	Minsk	Belarus	Minsk-Arena	Black Line	5,565 / 12,000	$571,325
16 February 2018	Saint Petersburg	Russia	Saint Petersburg Sports and Concert Complex	Black Line	—N/a	—N/a
18 February 2018	Helsinki	Finland	Hartwall Arena	Black Line	11,062 / 11,062	$1,091,441
20 February 2018	Riga	Latvia	Arena Riga	Black Line	12,205 / 12,205	$1,230,947
22 February 2018	Vilnius	Lithuania	Siemens Arena	Black Line	12,006 / 12,006	$1,326,598
25 February 2018	Moscow	Russia	Olimpiyskiy	Black Line	22,879 / 22,879	$1,870,129
Latin America
11 March 2018	Mexico City	Mexico	Foro Sol	Rey Pila	128,521 / 128,521	$7,598,275
13 March 2018	Mexico City	Mexico	Foro Sol	Rey Pila	128,521 / 128,521	$7,598,275
16 March 2018	Bogotá	Colombia	Simón Bolívar Park	Estados Alterados	13,375 / 13,375	$1,276,390
18 March 2018	Lima	Peru	Estadio Nacional de Lima	Cementerio Inocentes	18,742 / 18,742	$ 994,138
21 March 2018	Santiago	Chile	Estadio Nacional Julio Martínez Prádanos	Matías Aguayo & The Desdemonas	60,668 / 60,668	$ 3,985,257
24 March 2018	La Plata	Argentina	Estadio Ciudad de La Plata	Juana Molina	47,214 / 47,214	$ 4,095,289
27 March 2018	São Paulo	Brazil	Allianz Parque	Gui Boratto	24,180 / 24,180	$ 2,115,569
North America
22 May 2018	Anaheim	United States	Honda Center	Black Rebel; Motorcycle Club	—N/a	—N/a
24 May 2018	Sacramento	United States	Golden 1 Center	Black Rebel; Motorcycle Club	12,396 / 12,396	$1,146,455
27 May 2018	San Antonio	United States	AT&T Center	Black Rebel; Motorcycle Club	13,221 / 13,221	$1,144,480
29 May 2018	Tulsa	United States	BOK Center	Black Rebel; Motorcycle Club	—N/a	—N/a
1 June 2018	Chicago	United States	United Center	EMA	14,244 / 14,244	$1,368,405
3 June 2018	Philadelphia	United States	Wells Fargo Center	EMA	10,988 / 21,000	$905,675
6 June 2018	Brooklyn	United States	Barclays Center	EMA	14,483 / 14,483	$1,531,052
9 June 2018	Boston	United States	TD Garden	EMA	11,581 / 19,600	$1,011,092
11 June 2018	Toronto	Canada	Air Canada Centre	EMA	14,270 / 14,270	$1,310,416
Europe
23 June 2018 (Note: The concert on 23 June 2018 in Newport was part of the Isle of Wight Festival.)	Newport	England	Seaclose Park	—N/a	—N/a	—N/a
26 June 2018 (Note: The concert on 26 June 2018 in Sopron was part of the Volt Festival.)	Sopron	Hungary	Lővér Camping	—N/a	—N/a	—N/a
28 June 2018 (Note: The concert on 28 June 2018 in Odense was part of the Tinderbox Festival.)	Odense	Denmark	Tusindårsskoven	—N/a	—N/a	—N/a
30 June 2018 (Note: The concert on 30 June 2018 in St. Gallen was part of the OpenAir St. Gallen festival.)	St. Gallen	Switzerland	Sittertobel	—N/a	—N/a	—N/a
2 July 2018 (Note: The concert on 2 July 2018 in Bartolo was part of the Collisioni Festival.)	Barolo	Italy	Piazza Rossa	Marlene Kuntz	—N/a	—N/a
5 July 2018 (Note: The concert on 5 July 2018 in Gdynia was part of the Open'er Festival.)	Gdynia	Poland	Gdynia-Kosakowo Airport	—N/a	—N/a	—N/a
7 July 2018 (Note: The concert on 7 July 2018 in Arras was part of the Main Square Festival.)	Arras	France	Citadelle d'Arras	—N/a	—N/a	—N/a
9 July 2018 (Note: The concert on 9 July 2018 in Arras was part of the Festival Beauregard.)	Hérouville-Saint-Clair	France	Château de Beauregard	—N/a	—N/a	—N/a
12 July 2018 (Note: The concert on 12 July 2018 in Aix-les-Bains was part of the Musilac Music Festival.)	Aix-les-Bains	France	Lac du Bourget	—N/a	—N/a	—N/a
14 July 2018 (Note: The concert on 14 July 2018 in Madrid was part of the Mad Cool Festival.)	Madrid	Spain	Espacio Valdebebas-IFEMA	—N/a	—N/a	—N/a
17 July 2018 (Note: The concert on 17 July 2018 in Nyon was part of the Paléo Festival.)	Nyon	Switzerland	Plaine de l'Asse	—N/a	—N/a	—N/a
19 July 2018 (Note: The concert on 19 July 2018 in Carhaix was part of the Vieilles Charrues Festival.)	Carhaix	France	La Prairie de Kerampuilh	—N/a	—N/a	—N/a
21 July 2018 (Note: The concert on 21 July 2018 in Paris was part of the Lollapalooza Paris festival.)	Paris	France	Longchamp Racecourse	—N/a	—N/a	—N/a
23 July 2018	Berlin	Germany	Waldbühne	DAF	43,783 / 43,783	$3,857,267
25 July 2018	Berlin	Germany	Waldbühne	DAF	43,783 / 43,783	$3,857,267
Total					2,470,918 / 2,542,538 (97.18%)	$199,581,441

== Musicians ==
=== Depeche Mode ===
- Andy Fletcher – keyboards
- Dave Gahan – lead vocals
- Martin Gore – guitar, keyboards, lead and backing vocals

=== Additional musicians ===
- Christian Eigner – drums
- Peter Gordeno – keyboards, piano, bass guitar, backing vocals
