= Spirits in the Forest =

2019 film directed by Anton Corbijn

- Theatrical release poster
- Directed by: Anton Corbijn; John Merizalde; Pasqual Gutierrez
- Starring: Depeche Mode; Indra Amarjagal; Daniel Cassus; Liz Dwyer; Cristian Flueraru; Carine Puzenat; Dicken Schrader; Korben Schrader; Milah Schrader
- Cinematography: Jeremy Snell; Kristian Zuniga
- Music by: Depeche Mode
- Distributed by: Trafalgar Releasing
- Release date: 21 November 2019
- Running time: 81 minutes
- Language: English
- Box office: $2,531,785 – $4,500,000

Spirits in the Forest – A Depeche Mode Film is a live concert film, documentary, and album by the English electronic music band Depeche Mode, directed by award-winning filmmaker and long-time artistic collaborator Anton Corbijn. The film chronicles the final concert of the band's Global Spirit Tour at the Waldbühne in Berlin, Germany, as well as the stories of six fans of the band. The film was released to cinemas worldwide on 21 November 2019. A DVD and Blu-ray release featuring the full concert titled LiVE SPiRiTS was released on 26 June 2020.

== Background ==
As part of a promotion for the release of their album Spirit, Depeche Mode announced that a contest would be held in which one fan or celebrity would take over Depeche Mode's Facebook page every day for a year. A press release stated that winners would post to the band's seven million followers their own "personal anecdotes, videos, concert photos, covers of the band's songs, or other Depeche Mode-related content." Celebrities who contributed to the takeover include Trent Reznor, Tony Hawk, Richard Blade, and Chris Hardwick, as well as Charity: Water. From these contest winners, six fans were chosen to be featured in the film. The production crew travelled to each of the six fans' hometowns to film, then continued their stories as they journeyed to see the final concert of the Global Spirit Tour, which took place at the Waldbühne in Berlin, Germany. In addition to the fans' stories, the film incorporates footage from the final two shows of the Global Spirit Tour, both of which took place at the Waldbühne, on 23 and 25 July 2018. The setlist played featured a wide array of songs from throughout their career including multiple from their most recent album, Spirit, as well as songs that haven't been played in over a decade such as "Useless" and "The Things You Said" from Ultra and Music for the Masses.

In September 2019 it was announced that the film would debut globally for one night only, on 21 November 2019. Initially expected to screen at 2400 cinemas worldwide, the number was later revised up to 2800. On 29 October 2019, a preview of the film was hosted at the Curzon Mayfair in London, featuring a Q&A session with director Corbijn. The six fans who are the main characters of the film were announced as Indra Amarjagal from Mongolia; Daniel Cassús, a Brazilian living in Berlin; Liz Dwyer from the U.S.A.; Christian Flueraru from Romania; Carine Puzenat from Perpignan, France; and Dicken Schrader from Colombia.

A home release on CD, DVD, and Blu-ray was released on 26 June 2020. It is Depeche Mode's eighth live album and continues the tradition of recording and releasing performances from at least one show each tour. One week prior to the 26 June 2020 release date, many of the fans followed in the movie filmed an unboxing of the DVD box set for the Depeche Mode YouTube channel. The live version of "Cover Me" was released on YouTube on 22 June 2020 to anticipate the upcoming release. A livestream of the full concert aired on the LiveNation YouTube channel on 25 June 2020.

== Track listing ==
Live Spirits Soundtrack

Live album by Depeche Mode
- Released: 26 June 2020
- Length: 1:56:00
- Label: Columbia

Depeche Mode chronology
Spirit (2017)	Live Spirits Soundtrack (2020)	Memento Mori (2023)

Live Spirits Soundtrack – DVD & CD
No.	Title	Original release	Length
1.	"Intro"	N/A	2:29
2.	"Going Backwards"	Spirit	6:12
3.	"It's No Good"	Ultra	4:56
4.	"A Pain That I'm Used To"	Playing the Angel	4:29
5.	"Useless"	Ultra	5:32
6.	"Precious"	Playing the Angel	4:56
7.	"World in My Eyes"	Violator	5:31
8.	"Cover Me"	Spirit	5:08
9.	"The Things You Said"	Music for the Masses	3:47
10.	"Insight"	Ultra	5:37
11.	"Poison Heart"	Spirit	3:26
12.	"Where's the Revolution"	Spirit	4:54
13.	"Everything Counts"	Construction Time Again	8:07
14.	"Stripped"	Black Celebration	5:04
15.	"Enjoy the Silence"	Violator	7:24
16.	"Never Let Me Down Again"	Music for the Masses	6:21
17.	"I Want You Now"	Music for the Masses	4:32
18.	"Heroes"	Cover	6:27
19.	"Walking in My Shoes"	Songs of Faith and Devotion	8:29
20.	"Personal Jesus"	Violator	6:17
21.	"Just Can't Get Enough"	Speak & Spell	6:48
Total length:			1:54:00

== Reception ==
=== Spirits in the Forest ===
Spirits in the Forest received generally positive reviews from both movie and music critics alike. The film has an aggregate score of 100% on Rotten Tomatoes. Many critics compared the film to their 1989 film, 101, as it also follows the fans as well as the band. David Ehrlich of IndieWire felt that the film captured "The experience of watching it dovetails with that of going to a live show and being surrounded by thousands of strangers who share your same love" since it follows both the fans and the band closely.

Professional ratings
Review scores
Source	Rating
AllMusic	4/5
Reflections of Darkness	7.3/10

== Box office performance ==
Sources vary on the total gross of the movie's one-night release, with one claiming about US $2.5m while another claims US $4.5m. It reached Number 3 on the box office charts in Mexico and Number 2 in both Germany and the UK.

== Charts ==
=== Weekly charts ===
Weekly chart performance for Live Spirits Soundtrack
Chart (2020)	Peak position
Austrian Albums (Ö3 Austria)	4
Belgian Albums (Ultratop Flanders)	14
Belgian Albums (Ultratop Wallonia)	2
Czech Albums (ČNS IFPI)	14
Danish Albums (Hitlisten)	20
Dutch Albums (Album Top 100)	16
Finnish Albums (Suomen virallinen lista)	27
French Albums (SNEP)	4
German Albums (Offizielle Top 100)	1
Hungarian Albums (MAHASZ)	2
Italian Albums (FIMI)	7
Polish Albums (ZPAV)	5
Portuguese Albums (AFP)	4
Spanish Albums (Promusicae)	3
Swiss Albums (Schweizer Hitparade)	6

=== Year-end charts ===
Year-end chart performance for Live Spirits Soundtrack
Chart (2020)	Position
Belgian Albums (Ultratop Wallonia)	110
German Albums (Offizielle Top 100)	76
Hungarian Albums (MAHASZ)	80
