= Spirit (Depeche Mode album) =

2017 studio album by Depeche Mode

Studio album by Depeche Mode
- Released: 17 March 2017
- Recorded: April–August 2016
- Studios: Sound Design (Santa Barbara, California); Jungle City (New York City)
- Genres: Synth-pop; alternative rock; industrial
- Length: 49:23
- Labels: Columbia; Mute
- Producer: James Ford

Depeche Mode chronology
Delta Machine (2013)	Spirit (2017)	Live Spirits Soundtrack (2020)

Singles from Spirit
- 1. "Where's the Revolution" Released: 3 February 2017; 2. "Going Backwards" Released: 23 June 2017; 3. "Cover Me" Released: 6 October 2017

Spirit is the fourteenth studio album by the English electronic music band Depeche Mode, released on 17 March 2017 by Columbia and Mute Records. The album was recorded with new producer James Ford, and was preceded by the single "Where's the Revolution". It was the final Depeche Mode studio album to feature co-founder and keyboardist Andy Fletcher before his death on 26 May 2022, and as such was the band's final album to be recorded as a trio. The album produced three singles.

== Background and composition ==
Spirit was largely inspired by Depeche Mode's distaste for the political climate in the United States and the United Kingdom. In an interview with Vevo, Dave Gahan stated, "We're really kind of upset about what's going on in the world."

In the music video for "Where's the Revolution", the band members appear in Marx-like false beards and oversee a dystopian parade scene. Spirit also reflects on climate change and industrialization, as Martin Gore confirmed: "'The Worst Crime' is about destroying the environment. We are not just destroying it for those of us who live in the present. We are condemning the planet and the next generations, our children and our grandchildren."

The album's lyrics are direct and straightforward. Gahan told Billboard, "There are songs that are quite literal on the album. 'Scum' for instance, it was a lot of fun recording that song and singing it." The closing track "Fail", is the first time the band used profanity in their music. When asked about why "Fail" was chosen to be the closing track, Gore explained that it "sums up the album in a way. The good thing about it is the lyrics might be depressing but the music is so pretty". "So Much Love" was the last song written for the album. Gore stated in an interview: "I felt that I had to write something positive. I felt that I had to say that, with all this going, it doesn't matter what you do to me, there is still a lot of love in me." When the band was deciding on the track listing, Gahan wanted to end the album on a happy note with "So Much Love", but was ultimately outvoted by the other members.

Some of the album's tracks are non-political. "Poison Heart" was written like a breakup song, but Gahan explained that it is about the inability to relate to other people. Gore wrote the track "Eternal" for his younger daughter and, despite its dark tone and dramatic composition, Gore believes that "it's my way of romance. I think that when you put a child into this era, you have to take the worst into account".

Gahan revealed that Gore had many instrumentals left over from his solo album MG (2015). One of those instrumentals was later developed into the track "You Move". "You Move" was also the first time Gore and Gahan wrote a song together that had made it onto an album (excluding deluxe editions). Some of the tracks ended up with a very cinematic composition such as "Cover Me". According to an interview with keyboard programmer Matrixxman, working on "Cover Me" was initially difficult, but Gahan inspired everyone to get very creative on that track.

The recording sessions were fraught with tensions between the band members. Producer James Ford recalled: "It was a really difficult record to make. There was lots of like passive aggressive animosity", stating that "it got to the point where they nearly split up". He remembered arguing with Gore over track listings and which songs would make the final cut. Songs that would feature on the album played a large part in these tensions that fraught the Spirit sessions. Gahan recalled that "In the end James was kind of, 'I've had enough of this! I want everyone out of studio. I just want Martin and Dave to sit in here and we're going to talk about this.'" Fellow bandmate, Andy Fletcher was very upset with the idea and initially opposed, "Fletch did not like that. He literally had to get manhandled out of the studio by our manager. I mean, kicking and screaming. 'I'm in the band! Why aren't I in this conversation?'" When Gahan and Gore had begun talking to one another they realised their issues were more wide-ranging than they had thought. "We had these unspoken things. Martin was like, 'Well, you get this and you can walk on stage and everybody goes nuts. And I write the songs.' ... 'How many songs can I have then?' ... 'Well if there's 12 you can have four at the most.' ... 'Fine! Now I know, right? So I won't bother writing 10!'" Gahan then said in the end "we hugged it out and told each other how much we loved each other", and that "a certain amount of tension, I actually believe, is very important when you're working on music".

== Promotion ==
On 11 October 2016, the band announced that they would embark on the Global Spirit Tour to support the album. The tour began in Stockholm, Sweden, on 5 May 2017 and ended on 25 July 2018 in Berlin, Germany. The Global Spirit Tour went on to become the band's largest tour, and saw the band play to more than 3 million fans around the world. The final two shows of the tour were recorded by long-time visual collaborator Anton Corbijn for their concert film and documentary Spirits in the Forest, released in theaters in November 2019. The full concert film later received a home release on 26 June 2020.

The album was also promoted by three singles, "Where's the Revolution", released on 3 February 2017, "Going Backwards", released on 23 June 2017, and "Cover Me", released on 6 October 2017.

== Reception ==
Professional ratings
Aggregate scores
Source	Rating
AnyDecentMusic?	6.6/10
Metacritic	74/100
Review scores
Source	Rating
AllMusic	4/5 stars
Entertainment Weekly	A−
The Guardian	4/5 stars
The Independent	2/5 stars
Mojo	4/5 stars
The Observer	3/5 stars
Pitchfork	6.8/10
Q	4/5 stars
Rolling Stone	3.5/5 stars
Uncut	7/10

Spirit received generally positive reviews from critics upon release. At Metacritic, which assigns a normalised rating out of 100 to reviews from mainstream publications, the album received an average score of 74, based on 24 reviews. Neil Z. Yeung of AllMusic stated, "Robust and fearless, Spirit may end up being one of the earliest and best salvos of its political era. Despite dour lyrics to the contrary, Depeche Mode haven't given up on humanity".

Saby Reyes-Kulkarni of Pitchfork wrote that "Spirit is so convincing in spite of its radical shift in tenor. For both the band and audience, that shift couldn't have come at a better time". Kitty Empire of The Guardian stated that "By the time cosseted arena bands reach their 37th year, their need to engage with the real world is moot, but here's Martin Gore – DepMo's chief songwriter – lambasting greedy corporations". Various critics have cited the album's conscious lyrics and bleak instrumentals as a positive aspect.

In contrast, Andy Gill of The Independent criticized the album, stating that "Depeche Mode get serious and political, which doesn't really suit them." While many critics praised the band's ability to tackle political and social commentary, a significant number were left unsatisfied. Despite mixed reception from some critics, Spirit still appeared on many end-of-year 2017 lists such as those from Q Magazine and AllMusic.

=== Accolades ===
Publication	Accolade	Year	Rank
Drowned in Sound	Favourite Albums of 2017	2017	84
Q Magazine	Top 50 Albums of 2017	2017	49
Gaffa	Top 20 Albums of 2017	2017	12
AllMusic	AllMusic Best of 2017	2017	N/A
Classic Pop	Top 10 Albums of 2017	2017	2
Vive Le Rock!	Top 50 Albums of 2017	2017	30
MeHaceRudio	The Best Albums In English 2017	2017	35

== Commercial performance ==
Spirit debuted at number five on the UK Albums Chart with 23,658 units sold in its first week, becoming the band's 17th top-10 album in the United Kingdom. The following week, it dropped out of the top 10 to number 17 with sales of 5,658 copies. The album debuted at number five on the US Billboard 200, selling 64,000 album-equivalent units (62,000 in pure album sales). Even though Spirit's first week of sales wasn't as successful as Delta Machine's in the United Kingdom, Spirit's first week outperformed Delta Machine's first week of sales in the United States by 12,000 album-equivalent units.

== Track listing ==
All tracks are written by Martin L. Gore, except where noted. All lead vocals by Dave Gahan, except where noted.

No.	Title	Writer(s)	Lead vocals	Length
1.	"Going Backwards"			5:43
2.	"Where's the Revolution"			4:59
3.	"The Worst Crime"			3:48
4.	"Scum"			3:14
5.	"You Move"	Gore; Dave Gahan		3:50
6.	"Cover Me"	Gahan; Peter Gordeno; Christian Eigner		4:52
7.	"Eternal"		Gore	2:25
8.	"Poison Heart"	Gahan; Gordeno; Eigner		3:17
9.	"So Much Love"			4:29
10.	"Poorman"			4:26
11.	"No More (This Is the Last Time)"	Gahan; Kurt Uenala		3:13
12.	"Fail"		Gore	5:07
Total length:				49:23

Deluxe edition bonus disc
No.	Title	Writer(s)	Length
1.	"Cover Me" (alt out)	Gahan; Gordeno; Eigner	4:27
2.	"Scum" (Frenetic mix)		5:26
3.	"Poison Heart" (Tripped mix)	Gahan; Gordeno; Eigner	4:16
4.	"Fail" (Cinematic cut)		5:38
5.	"So Much Love" (Machine mix)		7:20
Total length:			27:07

== Personnel ==
Credits adapted from the liner notes of Spirit.

=== Depeche Mode ===
- Andy Fletcher
- Dave Gahan
- Martin L. Gore

=== Additional musicians ===
- Matrixxman – programming
- Kurt Uenala – programming (all tracks); electric bass (tracks 8, 11)
- James Ford – drums (tracks 1–6, 8–12); pedal steel (track 6)

=== Technical ===
- James Ford – production, mixing
- Jimmy Robertson – engineering, mix engineering
- Connor Long – studio assistance
- Óscar Muñoz – studio assistance
- David Schaeman – studio assistance
- Brendan Morawski – studio assistance, mix assistance
- Brian Lucey – mastering

=== Artwork ===
- Anton Corbijn – cover, all visuals, art direction, design
- SMEL – design

== Charts ==
=== Weekly charts ===
Weekly chart performance for Spirit
Chart (2017)	Peak position
Australian Albums (ARIA)	14
Austrian Albums (Ö3 Austria)	1
Belgian Albums (Ultratop Flanders)	2
Belgian Albums (Ultratop Wallonia)	1
Canadian Albums (Billboard)	4
Croatian International Albums (HDU)	2
Czech Albums (ČNS IFPI)	1
Danish Albums (Hitlisten)	4
Dutch Albums (Album Top 100)	4
Finnish Albums (Suomen virallinen lista)	5
French Albums (SNEP)	1
German Albums (Offizielle Top 100)	1
Greek Albums (IFPI)	2
Hungarian Albums (MAHASZ)	1
Irish Albums (IRMA)	3
Italian Albums (FIMI)	1
Japanese Albums (Oricon)	62
Mexican Albums (AMPROFON)	7
New Zealand Albums (RMNZ)	32
Norwegian Albums (VG-lista)	7
Polish Albums (ZPAV)	1
Portuguese Albums (AFP)	1
Scottish Albums (Official Charts)	3
Slovak Albums (ČNS IFPI)	1
Spanish Albums (Promusicae)	2
Swedish Albums (Sverigetopplistan)	3
Swiss Albums (Schweizer Hitparade)	1
UK Albums (Official Charts)	5
US Billboard 200	5
US Top Alternative Albums (Billboard)	1
US Top Rock Albums (Billboard)	1

=== Year-end charts ===
Year-end chart performance for Spirit
Chart (2017)	Position
Austrian Albums (Ö3 Austria)	52
Belgian Albums (Ultratop Flanders)	44
Belgian Albums (Ultratop Wallonia)	7
Czech Albums (ČNS IFPI)	3
French Albums (SNEP)	54
German Albums (Offizielle Top 100)	10
Hungarian Albums (MAHASZ)	24
Italian Albums (FIMI)	27
Polish Albums (ZPAV)	3
Spanish Albums (PROMUSICAE)	30
Swiss Albums (Schweizer Hitparade)	16
US Top Rock Albums (Billboard)	68

== Certifications ==
Certifications and sales for Spirit
Region	Certification	Certified units/sales
France (SNEP)	Platinum	100,000^{‡}
Germany (BVMI)	Gold	100,000^{‡}
Hungary (MAHASZ)	Platinum	2,000^{‡}
Italy (FIMI)	Gold	25,000^{*}
Poland (ZPAV)	3× Platinum	60,000^{‡}
Switzerland (IFPI Switzerland)	Gold	10,000^{‡}
United Kingdom (BPI)	Silver	60,000^{‡}
Summaries
Worldwide	—	800,000
^{*} Sales figures based on certification alone.^{‡} Sales+streaming figures based on certification alone.
