= Home (Depeche Mode song) =

1997 single by Depeche Mode

Single by Depeche Mode

from the album Ultra
- B-side: "Barrel of a Gun" (live); "It's No Good" (live)
- Released: 16 June 1997
- Length: 5:45
- Label: Mute
- Songwriter: Martin L. Gore
- Producer: Tim Simenon

Depeche Mode singles chronology
"It's No Good" (1997)	"Home" (1997)	"Useless" (1997)

Music video
- "Home" on YouTube

"Home" is a song by English electronic music group Depeche Mode, released on 16 June 1997, by Mute Records, as the third single from their ninth album, Ultra (1997). The song is sung by guitarist Martin Gore, who also wrote it, rather than the band's main singer, Dave Gahan. Tim Simenon produced it.

== Critical reception ==
Larry Flick from Billboard magazine wrote that the song "shows the venerable electronic group in a predictably melancholy mood. But who cares? Few acts can dish out the angst better, and 'Home' pleases with its baroque strings and skittling beat." He added, "Modern rock radio is a given. The question hanging in the balance is whether popsters will once again welcome Depeche Mode onto top 40 airwaves. Hard to say, though this is certainly the act's best mainstream single in a good long time." Pan-European magazine Music & Media deemed it as a "somewhat subdued but still sparkling affair." A reviewer from Music Week gave it a score of four out of five, describing it as "a downbeat track with an upbeat message, strong on strings and big synth sounds. Lighters aloft."

== Track listings ==
- UK CD1
1. "Home"
2. "Home" (Air "Around the Golf" remix)
3. "Home" (LFO Meant to Be)
4. "Home" (The Noodles & The Damage Done)
- UK CD2
1. "Home" (Jedi Knights remix (Drowning in Time))
2. "Home" (Grantby mix)
3. "Barrel of a Gun" (live)
4. "It's No Good" (live)
- UK 12-inch single

A1. "Home" (Jedi Knights remix (Drowning in Time))
A2. "Home" (Air "Around the Golf" remix)
AA1. "Home" (LFO Meant to Be)
AA2. "Home" (Grantby mix)

- UK cassette single
1. "Home"
2. "It's No Good" (live)
- Japanese CD single
1. "Home"
2. "Home" (Air "Around the Golf" remix)
3. "Home" (LFO Meant to Be)
4. "Home" (The Noodles & The Damage Done)
5. "Home" (Jedi Knights remix (Drowning in Time))
6. "Home" (Grantby mix)
7. "Barrel of a Gun" (live)
8. "It's No Good" (live)

== "Home" / "Useless" ==
"Home" / "Useless"

Single by Depeche Mode

from the album Ultra
- Released: 18 November 1997
- Length: 5:46 ("Home"); 4:06 ("Useless")
- Label: Reprise; Mute
- Songwriter: Martin L. Gore
- Producer: Tim Simenon

Depeche Mode singles chronology
"It's No Good" (1997)	"Home" / "Useless" (1997)	"Only When I Lose Myself" (1998)

On 18 November 1997, "Home" and "Useless" were released as a double A-side single in the United States and Canada. The front cover art has the "Home" cover on the front, with the "Home" track list, and the back cover art has the "Useless" cover art, with the "Useless" track list.

=== Track listings ===
CD and cassette single
No.	Title	Length
1.	"Home"	5:46
2.	"Home" (Air "Around the Golf" remix)	3:58
3.	"Useless" (remix)	4:06

Maxi-CD single
No.	Title	Length
1.	"Home" (album version)	5:46
2.	"Home" (Grantby mix)	4:38
3.	"Home" (LFO Meant to Be)	4:26
4.	"Home" (The Noodles & The Damage Done)	6:22
5.	"Useless" (CJ Bolland Ultrasonar extended mix)	6:00
6.	"Useless" (CJ Bolland Funky Sub mix)	5:38
7.	"Useless" (Kruder + Dorfmeister Session™)	9:11
8.	"Useless" (Escape from Wherever: Parts 1 & 2)	7:15
9.	"Barrel of a Gun" (video)
10.	"It's No Good" (video)
11.	"Home" (video)
12.	"Useless" (video)

7-inch single
No.	Title	Length
1.	"Home"	5:46
2.	"Useless" (remix)	4:06

12-inch single
No.	Title	Length
1.	"Home" (The Noodles & Damage Done)	6:22
2.	"Home" (LFO Meant to Be)	4:26
3.	"Useless" (CJ Bolland Ultrasonar extended mix)	6:00
4.	"Useless" (CJ Bolland Funky Sub mix)	5:38

== Charts ==
=== Weekly charts ===
1997 weekly chart performance for "Home"
Chart (1997)	Peak position
Australia (ARIA)	102
Belgium (Ultratip Bubbling Under Flanders)	19
Europe (Eurochart Hot 100 Singles)	40
Finland (Suomen virallinen lista)	15
Germany (GfK)	11
Italy (FIMI)	1
Italy Airplay (Music & Media)	4
Netherlands (Dutch Top 40 Tipparade)	21
Netherlands (Single Top 100)	78
Scottish Singles Sales (Official Charts)	29
Spain (AFYVE)	4
Sweden (Sverigetopplistan)	10
Switzerland (Schweizer Hitparade)	47
UK Singles (Official Charts)	23
UK Indie (OCC)	2
US Billboard Hot 100	88
US Dance Singles Sales (Billboard) with "Useless"	15

=== Year-end charts ===
Year-end chart performance for "Home"
Chart (1997)	Position
Romania (Romanian Top 100)	65

== Release history ==
Release dates and formats for "Home"
Region	Version	Date	Format(s)	Label(s)	Ref.
United Kingdom	"Home"	16 June 1997	12-inch vinyl; CD; cassette	Mute	
Japan	"Home"	18 September 1997	CD	Mute	
United States	"Home"	3 November 1997	Modern rock radio	Reprise; Mute	
United States	"Home" / "Useless"	18 November 1997	7-inch vinyl; 12-inch vinyl; CD; cassette	Reprise; Mute	
