= List of number-one albums of 1997 (Spain) =

The List of number-one albums of 1997 in Spain is derived from the Top 100 España record chart published weekly by PROMUSICAE (Productores de Música de España), a non-profit organization composed by Spain and multinational record companies. This association tracks record sales (physical and digital) in Spain.

== Albums ==
Week	Chart Date	Album	Artist	Reference
1	January 6	Spice	Spice Girls	
2	January 13	Spice	Spice Girls	
3	January 20	Spice	Spice Girls	
4	January 27	Spice	Spice Girls	
5	February 3	Spice	Spice Girls	
6	February 10	Spice	Spice Girls	
7	February 17	Spice	Spice Girls	
8	February 24	Spice	Spice Girls	
9	March 3	Pop	U2	
10	March 10	Corazón Indomable	Camela	
11	March 17	Corazón Indomable	Camela	
12	March 24	Spice	Spice Girls	
13	March 31	Spice	Spice Girls	
14	April 7	Spice	Spice Girls	
15	April 14	Ultra	Depeche Mode	
16	April 21	Spice	Spice Girls	
17	April 28	Mírame	Ana Belén	
18	May 5	Mírame	Ana Belén	
19	May 12	Blood on the Dance Floor: HIStory in the Mix	Michael Jackson	
20	May 19	Mírame	Ana Belén	
21	May 26	Mírame	Ana Belén	
22	June 2	Mírame	Ana Belén	
23	June 9	Mírame	Ana Belén	
24	June 16	Destination Anywhere	Jon Bon Jovi	
25	June 23	Mírame	Ana Belén	
26	June 30	The Fat of the Land	The Prodigy	
27	July 7	Puntos Cardinales	Ana Torroja	
28	July 14	Puntos Cardinales	Ana Torroja	
29	July 21	Puntos Cardinales	Ana Torroja	
30	July 28	Puntos Cardinales	Ana Torroja	
31	August 4	La Flaca	Jarabe de Palo	
32	August 11	Backstreet's Back	Backstreet Boys	
33	August 18	Backstreet's Back	Backstreet Boys	
34	August 25	Backstreet's Back	Backstreet Boys	
35	September 1	Más	Alejandro Sanz	
36	September 8	Más	Alejandro Sanz	
37	September 15	Más	Alejandro Sanz	
38	September 22	Más	Alejandro Sanz	
39	September 29	Más	Alejandro Sanz	
40	October 6	Más	Alejandro Sanz	
41	October 13	Más	Alejandro Sanz	
42	October 20	Más	Alejandro Sanz	
43	October 27	Más	Alejandro Sanz	
44	November 3	Más	Alejandro Sanz	
45	November 10	Más	Alejandro Sanz	
46	November 17	Más	Alejandro Sanz	
47	November 24	Más	Alejandro Sanz	
48	December 1	Más	Alejandro Sanz	
49	December 8	Más	Alejandro Sanz	
50	December 15	Más	Alejandro Sanz	
51	December 22	Más	Alejandro Sanz	
52	December 29	Más	Alejandro Sanz	

== See also ==
- List of number-one singles of 1997 (Spain)
