= Cover Me (Depeche Mode song) =

2017 song by Depeche Mode

Single by Depeche Mode

from the album Spirit
- Released: 6 October 2017
- Genre: Alternative rock; Blues; Dark wave; Synth pop
- Length: 4:01
- Label: Columbia
- Songwriters: Dave Gahan; Christian Eigner; Peter Gordeno
- Producer: James Ford

Depeche Mode singles chronology
"Going Backwards" (2017)	"Cover Me" (2017)	"Ghosts Again" (2023)

Music video
- "Cover Me" on YouTube

"Cover Me" is a song by English electronic music band Depeche Mode, released on October 6, 2017, via Columbia label. It is the third single from their fourteenth studio album, Spirit. The released single consists of several remixes of songs "Cover Me" and "So Much Love". It is the fourth single in the band's catalog that is co-written by lead singer Dave Gahan. It is the last single to feature Andy Fletcher before his death in 2022.

== Background ==
"Cover Me" was one of four songs Dave Gahan co-wrote. "Cover Me" also ended up being one of the most cinematic compositions on Spirit. According to an interview with keyboard programmer Matrixxman, working on "Cover Me" was initially difficult but Gahan inspired everyone to get very creative on that track. Gahan also stated in a video on their YouTube channel that he always envisioned the song as having two halves, a lyrical first half and a more spacious instrumental based second half.

Depeche Mode uploaded a live version of "Cover Me" to their YouTube channel days before the official release of the Live Spirits Soundtrack on 22 June 2020.

== Reception ==
Saby Reyes-Kulkarni of Pitchfork stated, "On 'Cover Me', Gore's haunting Lanois-esque guitar twang allows you to close your eyes and picture yourself under the Northern lights Gahan sings about."

== Track listing ==
All tracks are written by Dave Gahan, Peter Gordeno and Christian Eigner, except where noted.

CD
No.	Title	Writer(s)	Length
1.	"Cover Me" (radio edit)		4:01
2.	"Cover Me" (Warpaint Steez remix)		6:23
3.	"Cover Me" (Erol Alkan Black Out rework)		8:12
4.	"Cover Me" (Texas Gentlemen remix)		5:22
5.	"Cover Me" (Ellen Allien U.F.O. RMX)		9:37
6.	"Cover Me" (Ben Pearce remix)		5:59
7.	"Cover Me" (Josh T. Pearson Choose Hellth remix)		4:48
8.	"So Much Love" (Kalli remix)	Martin Gore	6:28

Double 12″
No.	Title	Writer(s)	Length
1.	"Cover Me" (Ellen Allien U.F.O. RMX)		9:36
2.	"Cover Me" (I Hate Models Cold Lights remix)		9:55
3.	"Cover Me" (Nicole Moudaber remix)		11:15
4.	"So Much Love" (Kalli remix)	Gore	6:28
5.	"Cover Me" (Erol Alkan White Light rework)		7:22
6.	"Cover Me" (Texas Gentlemen remix)		5:20
7.	"Cover Me" (Warpaint Steez remix)		6:22
8.	"Cover Me" (Josh T. Pearson Choose Hellth remix)		4:48

== Personnel ==
Depeche Mode

- Dave Gahan – lead vocals
- Martin Gore – guitar, keyboards, synthesizers, backing vocals
- Andy Fletcher – keyboards, synthesizers, backing vocals

Production

- James Ford – drums, pedal steel guitar, mixing, producing
- Kurt Uenala – programming
- Matrixxman – programming
- Jimmy Robertson – engineering
- Brendan Morawski – technician
- Anton Corbijn – artwork, design
- David Bett – design

== Charts ==
Weekly chart performance for "Cover Me"
Chart (2017)	Peak position
Hungary (Single Top 40)	35
