= List of number-one singles of 1997 (Spain) =

This is a list of the Spanish PROMUSICAE Top 20 Singles number-ones of 1997.

== Chart history ==
Issue date	Song	Artist
4 January	"Don't Cry for Me Argentina"	Madonna
11 January	"Don't Cry for Me Argentina"	Madonna
18 January	"Don't Cry for Me Argentina"	Madonna
25 January	"Don't Cry for Me Argentina"	Madonna
1 February	"Don't Cry for Me Argentina"	Madonna
8 February	"Don't Cry for Me Argentina"	Madonna
15 February	"Barrel of a Gun"	Depeche Mode
22 February	"Barrel of a Gun"	Depeche Mode
1 March	"Barrel of a Gun"	Depeche Mode
8 March	"Barrel of a Gun"	Depeche Mode
15 March	"Barrel of a Gun"	Depeche Mode
22 March	"Falling in Love (Is Hard on the Knees)"	Aerosmith
29 March	"Your Woman"	White Town
5 April	"Falling in Love (Is Hard on the Knees)"	Aerosmith
12 April	"Your Woman"	White Town
19 April	"It's No Good"	Depeche Mode
26 April	"Old Before I Die"	Robbie Williams
3 May	"Blood on the Dance Floor"	Michael Jackson
10 May	"Blood on the Dance Floor"	Michael Jackson
17 May	"Love Won't Wait"	Gary Barlow
24 May	"Blood on the Dance Floor"	Michael Jackson
31 May	"Blood on the Dance Floor"	Michael Jackson
7 June	"Blood on the Dance Floor"	Michael Jackson
14 June	"Midnight in Chelsea"	Jon Bon Jovi
21 June	"Midnight in Chelsea"	Jon Bon Jovi
28 June	"Love & Respect"	Supa T and The Party Animals
5 July	"A Contratiempo"	Ana Torroja
12 July	"A Contratiempo"	Ana Torroja
19 July	" D'You Know What I Mean?"	Oasis
26 July	"Everybody (Backstreet's Back)"	Backstreet Boys
2 August	"Everybody (Backstreet's Back)"	Backstreet Boys
9 August	"Everybody (Backstreet's Back)"	Backstreet Boys
16 August	"I'll Be Missing You"	Puff Daddy with Faith Evans featuring 112
23 August	"I'll Be Missing You"	Puff Daddy with Faith Evans featuring 112
30 August	"I'll Be Missing You"	Puff Daddy with Faith Evans featuring 112
7 September	"I'll Be Missing You"	Puff Daddy with Faith Evans featuring 112
13 September	"I'll Be Missing You"	Puff Daddy with Faith Evans featuring 112
20 September	"Salomé"	Bunbury
27 September	"Candle in the Wind 1997"	Elton John
4 October	"Candle in the Wind 1997"	Elton John
11 October	"Candle in the Wind 1997"	Elton John
18 October	"Candle in the Wind 1997"	Elton John
25 October	"Candle in the Wind 1997"	Elton John
1 November	"Candle in the Wind 1997"	Elton John
8 November	"Candle in the Wind 1997"	Elton John
15 November	"Candle in the Wind 1997"	Elton John
22 November	"Candle in the Wind 1997"	Elton John
29 November	"Candle in the Wind 1997"	Elton John
6 December	"Candle in the Wind 1997"	Elton John
13 December	"Candle in the Wind 1997"	Elton John
20 December	"En Navidad"	Rosana
27 December	"En Navidad"	Rosana

== See also ==
- 1997 in music
- List of number-one hits (Spain)
