= Where's the Revolution =

2017 single by Depeche Mode

Single by Depeche Mode

from the album Spirit
- B-side: "Various remixes"
- Released: 3 February 2017
- Recorded: 2016
- Length: 4:59
- Label: Columbia
- Songwriter: Martin L. Gore
- Producer: James Ford

Depeche Mode singles chronology
"Should Be Higher" (2013)	"Where's the Revolution" (2017)	"Going Backwards" (2017)

Music video
- "Where's the Revolution" on YouTube

"Where's the Revolution" is a song by English electronic music band Depeche Mode from their fourteenth studio album Spirit. It was released as the album's first single on 3 February 2017, on the 20th anniversary of "Barrel of a Gun". The cover art was designed by Anton Corbijn. The single was premiered on the Polish radio Trójka at midnight on 3 February. This single is notable for being the first Depeche Mode lead single to not chart on the UK Singles Chart, a trend that would continue with Spirit's following singles.

== Background ==
It was one of the first songs written for the album—according to Martin Gore, it was written at least two years before the release of album. The song is written from the perspective of Gore's view of the issues that were occurring in the world at the time. He discusses in an interview that "there was a sense of things going wrong and the world wasn't in a great place." He further goes, "The Syrian crisis had been dragging on for years... I live in America, and around that time there were blacks getting shot on a kind of weekly basis by the police and rioting, you know—the whole Middle East, is just a big mess."

In many interviews, the band have also stated that producer James Ford taught himself to play Gore's pedal steel guitar within one day while in the studio, and thus this guitar was used in "Where's the Revolution" and other tracks on the album.

== Promotion ==
The song was premiered audio-only on YouTube. A dystopian-themed black-and-white music video was released a week later, on 9 February. The music video, as well as the animated visuals with flying flags and marching boots for the audio-only video, were directed and designed by Anton Corbijn.

== Releases ==
The song is available as digital download from Amazon, HMV, Google Play Music and iTunes. It is also available as a 5-track CD single, as a double vinyl (containing 9 remixes, released on 28 April 2017) and as an exclusive 7″ vinyl promotional release in the April edition of the German music magazine Musik Express, with a live version of a Delta Machine song "Should Be Higher" as B-side.

== Track listing ==
- CD / digital download
1. "Where's the Revolution" – 4:59
2. "Where's the Revolution" (Ewan Pearson remix) – 8:36
3. "Where's the Revolution" (Algiers remix) – 4:55
4. "Where's the Revolution" (Terence Fixmer remix) – 6:23
5. "Where's the Revolution" (Autolux remix) – 4:17
- Double 12″
1. "Where's the Revolution" (Autolux remix) – 4:17
2. "Where's the Revolution" (Pearson Sound remix) – 6:28
3. "Where's the Revolution" (Algiers Click Farm remix) – 3:28
4. "Where's the Revolution" (Simian Mobile Disco remix) – 8:46
5. "Where's the Revolution" (Pearson Sound Beatless remix) – 4:20
6. "Where's the Revolution" (Simian Mobile Disco dub) – 8:45
7. "Where's the Revolution" (Terence Fixmer Spatial mix) – 6:34
8. "Where's the Revolution" (Patrice Bäumel remix) – 6:57
9. "Where's the Revolution" (Ewan Pearson Kompromat dub) – 8:20

== Credits and personnel ==
- Martin Gore – composer, lyrics
- James Ford – drums, mixer, producer
- Matrixxman – programming
- Kurt Uenala – programming
- Jimmy Robertson – engineer, mixer
- Connor Long – assistant engineer
- Oscar Munoz – assistant engineer
- David Schaeman – assistant engineer
- Brendan Morawski – assistant engineer, mix assistant
- Brian Lucey – mastering

== Charts ==
=== Weekly charts ===
Weekly chart performance for "Where's the Revolution"
Chart (2017)	Peak position
Belgium (Ultratip Bubbling Under Flanders)	15
Belgium (Ultratip Bubbling Under Wallonia)	13
Dutch Single Tip (MegaCharts)	26
France (SNEP)	22
Germany (GfK)	29
Hungary (Single Top 40)	3
Italy (Musica e dischi)	17
Scotland Singles (OCC)	76
Slovakia (Singles Digitál Top 100)	31
Slovenia (SloTop50)	44
Spain (PROMUSICAE)	18
Switzerland (Schweizer Hitparade)	57
US Alternative Airplay (Billboard)	40

=== Year-end charts ===
Year-end chart performance for "Where's the Revolution"
Chart (2017)	Position
Hungary (Single Top 40)	52
