= Useless (song) =

1997 single by Depeche Mode

Single by Depeche Mode

from the album Ultra
- Released: 20 October 1997
- Studio: Abbey Road, Eastcote, Westside, Strongroom, RAK (London); Electric Lady (New York City); Larrabee West (Los Angeles)
- Length: 5:12 (album version); 4:53 (single remix); 4:44 (album edit)
- Label: Mute
- Songwriter: Martin L. Gore
- Producers: Tim Simenon; Alan Moulder (single remix)

Depeche Mode singles chronology
"Home" (1997)	"Useless" (1997)	"Only When I Lose Myself" (1998)

Music video
- "Useless" on YouTube

"Useless" Is a song by English electronic music group Depeche Mode, released on 20 October 1997 as the fourth and final single from their ninth studio album, Ultra (1997). It was released with "Home" as a double A-side in the United States due to "Useless" getting airplay on US radio stations before "Home" was announced. "Useless" features a bass contribution performed by bassist Doug Wimbish, known for his session work and as a member of Living Colour.

== Release ==
The single version of "Useless" was remixed by Alan Moulder, and is not only shortened but also features several alterations (similar to the changes done to the 7-inch versions of "Behind the Wheel" and "Condemnation"), such as having a different beat and is slightly sped up. Several elements have also been mixed to sound harsher, such as the synth on the second chorus. On the US double A-side single, the single remix is replaced by the CJ Bolland Ultrasonar Edit.

There are no actual B-sides for "Useless", except for remixes and live versions of the song. Some versions of the CD single feature the videos for "Barrel of a Gun" and "It's No Good". The 1997 music video for "Useless" was the last Depeche Mode video to be directed by Anton Corbijn for more than eight years. Though he remained working for Depeche Mode on all their album/single covers, press images and tour projections/designs, the record label decided to experiment with new directors for music videos. Corbijn's next video project with Depeche Mode was for "Suffer Well".

Depeche Mode licensed the Kruder & Dorfmeister remix of "Useless" to Victoria's Secret, for use in their "Natural Miracle Bra" ad campaign. It aired on US television for a few weeks.

== Track listings ==
All songs were written by Martin L. Gore. The live version of "Useless" was recorded on 10 April 1997 in London, England.

UK CD single

1. "Useless" (remix)
2. "Useless" (Escape from Wherever: Parts 1 & 2!)
3. "Useless" (Cosmic Blues mix)
4. "Barrel of a Gun" (video)

UK limited-edition CD single

1. "Useless" (CJ Bolland Ultrasonar mix)
2. "Useless" (The Kruder + Dorfmeister Session™)
3. "Useless" (live)
4. "It's No Good" (video)

UK 12-inch single

A1. "Useless" (The Kruder + Dorfmeister Session™)
AA1. "Useless" (CJ Bolland Funky sub mix)
AA2. "Useless" (Air 20 mix)

== "Home" / "Useless" ==
"Home" / "Useless"

Single by Depeche Mode

from the album Ultra
- Released: 18 November 1997
- Length: 5:46 ("Home"); 4:06 ("Useless")
- Label: Reprise; Mute
- Songwriter: Martin L. Gore
- Producer: Tim Simenon

Depeche Mode singles chronology
"It's No Good" (1997)	"Home" / "Useless" (1997)	"Only When I Lose Myself" (1998)

In November 1997, "Home" and "Useless" were released as a double A-side single in the US and Canada. The front cover art has the "Home" cover on the front, with the "Home" track list, and the back cover art has the "Useless" cover art, with the "Useless" track list.

=== Track listings ===
All songs were written by Gore. Gore sings lead on "Home", and Dave Gahan sings lead on "Useless".

CD and cassette single

1. "Home" – 5:46
2. "Home" (Air "Around the Golf" remix) – 3:58
3. "Useless" (remix) – 4:06

Maxi-CD single

1. "Home" (album version) – 5:46
2. "Home" (Grantby mix) – 4:38
3. "Home" (LFO Meant to Be) – 4:26
4. "Home" (The Noodles & The Damage Done) – 6:22
5. "Useless" (CJ Bolland Ultrasonar extended mix) – 6:00
6. "Useless" (CJ Bolland Funky Sub mix) – 5:38
7. "Useless" (Kruder + Dorfmeister Session™) – 9:11
8. "Useless" (Escape from Wherever: Parts 1 & 2) – 7:15
9. "Barrel of a Gun" (video)
10. "It's No Good" (video)
11. "Home" (video)
12. "Useless" (video)

7-inch single

A. "Home" – 5:46
B. "Useless" (remix) – 4:06

12-inch single

A1. "Home" (The Noodles & The Damage Done) – 6:22
A2. "Home" (LFO Meant to Be) – 4:26
AA1. "Useless" (CJ Bolland Ultrasonar extended mix) – 6:00
AA2. "Useless" (CJ Bolland Funky Sub mix) – 5:38

== Charts ==
Chart (1997)	Peak position
Australia (ARIA)	134
Europe (Eurochart Hot 100)	42
Finland (Suomen virallinen lista)	17
Germany (GfK)	16
Scottish Singles Sales (Official Charts)	28
Sweden (Sverigetopplistan)	16
UK Singles (Official Charts)	28
UK Indie (Official Charts)	4
US Dance Singles Sales (Billboard) with "Home"	15

== Release history ==
Region	Version	Date	Format(s)	Label(s)	Ref.
United States	"Useless"	4 August 1997	Alternative radio	Reprise	
United Kingdom	"Useless"	20 October 1997	12-inch vinyl; CD	Mute	
United States	"Home" / "Useless"	18 November 1997	7-inch vinyl; 12-inch vinyl; CD; cassette	Reprise; Mute	
