= Ultra (Depeche Mode album) =

1997 studio album by Depeche Mode

Studio album by Depeche Mode
- Released: 14 April 1997 (UK) 15 April 1997 (US)
- Recorded: October 1995 – November 1996
- Studios: Abbey Road, Eastcote, Westside, Strongroom and RAK (London); Electric Lady (New York City); Larrabee West (Los Angeles)
- Genres: Alternative rock; trip hop
- Length: 60:07
- Label: Mute (UK) Reprise/Warner Bros.(US)
- Producer: Tim Simenon

Depeche Mode chronology
Songs of Faith and Devotion Live (1993)	Ultra (1997)	The Singles 86>98 (1998)

Singles from Ultra
- 1. "Barrel of a Gun" Released: 3 February 1997; 2. "It's No Good" Released: 31 March 1997; 3. "Home" Released: 16 June 1997; 4. "Useless" Released: 20 October 1997

Ultra is the ninth studio album by the English electronic music band Depeche Mode, released on 14 April 1997 by Mute Records in the United Kingdom and 15 April 1997 by Reprise Records in the United States. It was the band's first album following the departure of Alan Wilder. Wilder's departure and lead singer Dave Gahan's drug problems, which culminated in a near-fatal overdose, had caused speculation that Depeche Mode was finished.

Ultra was the first album the band recorded as a trio since A Broken Frame (1982); it was also their first where the band members were not involved with production, with these duties being handled by Tim Simenon of Bomb the Bass fame. Though not directly supported by a full-length tour, it was promoted via a brief series of concerts promoted as Ultra Parties.

The album debuted at number one on the UK Albums Chart and at number five on the US Billboard 200. By April 2006, it had sold 584,000 copies in the United States. In 1999, Ned Raggett ranked the album at number 50 on his list of the "Top 136 or So Albums of the Nineties". That same year, the annual Ultra Music Festival in Miami was named after the album by its co-founder Russell Faibisch, and acknowledging its influence on the Polish rock scene, Tylko Rock ranked it at number 71 on its list of the "100 Albums That Shook Polish Rock".

The album was preceded by the singles "Barrel of a Gun", released on 3 February and "It's No Good" which was released on 31 March. It was followed by the singles "Home", released on 16 June and "Useless", released on 20 October.

== Background and composition ==
Depeche Mode had released their eighth studio album Songs of Faith and Devotion in 1993, the recording of which was fraught with inter-personal conflicts and made more difficult by lead singer Dave Gahan's heroin habit, songwriter Martin Gore's alcohol abuse, and Andy Fletcher's struggle with depression. The 1993–94 Devotional Tour, dubbed "the most debauched rock 'n roll tour ever" by Q magazine, led to further problems, and in June 1995, band member Alan Wilder announced his departure from the band, citing the uneven workload, internal problems, and personality conflicts. Gahan would later say, "To be honest, I felt that if anything was going to split up the band, that [Wilder's departure] was what it was. A very valuable person had left. Suddenly, musically, for me, there was a big hole. That inspiration and musicality wasn't there," later saying of Wilder's absence, "I miss him."

In late 1995, Gore gathered Fletcher and Gahan together to try and record new material he had written.

== Recording ==
Initially, the band wasn't sure they'd survive the loss of Wilder and Gahan's drug problems. Mute Records owner and occasional Depeche Mode producer Daniel Miller convinced the band to continue to record, suggesting that they start with a few songs, and maybe just record a short EP instead of a full album. Wilder had been the band's primary musician and producer over the past few albums, and with Wilder gone, the band knew they'd have to bring in more help to produce new material. The band started to work with producer Tim Simenon, known professionally as Bomb the Bass, who had remixed some of Depeche Mode's earlier singles and was a fan of the band. They met at Eastcote Studios in West London for their initial sessions which were described by both Fletcher and Gahan as having the feeling of their sessions for A Broken Frame, their 1982 album assembled after the loss of Vince Clarke, while the band were trying to figure out how to work together as a three-piece unit. Collectively, they decided to take their new material in a more danceable, electronic direction and away from the harder, rock-oriented sound of Songs of Faith and Devotion (1993).

=== London sessions ===
They started with a six-week recording session at Eastcote; said Simenon, "I hardly ever saw Dave Gahan in the studio and [Fletcher] would drop by, but Martin [Gore] and I put a lot of hours in. ... Martin doesn't discuss the music a lot of the time. I'd try to get him to talk about it, but generally if it's right he won't say anything. If it isn't, he will, and then he'll suggest another idea." Simenon and Gore started developing three songs during these sessions, "Sister of Night", "Insight" and "Useless", and decided that the sessions were productive enough that they should continue, and so scheduled another few months at Eastcote for early 1996.

One of the songs the band began working on during the second set of sessions was "Barrel of a Gun". For the combined six months of sessions in London, the band wanted to see what they could record together, but Gore was still drinking and Gahan was still using heroin. Gahan would attend Alcoholics Anonymous meetings, hit up a dealer on the way out of the meeting, and show up to the studio high. Gore and Fletcher weren't sure if Gahan was clean or not, but assumed he was clean, later calling that assumption "naive". Gahan later said that during this time, he had one foot in and one foot out, not of the band, but of life. Without Wilder, the band felt the need to bring in outside musicians. For "Useless", the band brought in the bassist Doug Wimbish (of the band Living Colour), and the drummer Gota Yashiki. Additionally, the band brought in Kerry Hopwood for programming and Dave Clayton for keyboards, both of whom filled roles left by Wilder's departure. Said Gore, "We have never worked with a programmer before; we've always done it ourselves ... We've never had outside musicians constantly in the studio with us before – I suppose we had Alan [Wilder] in the past, and Dave Clayton, the musician we're working with now, in a way fulfils Alan's role, but it's far easier to manipulate him. If Alan didn't like something, I am sure he wouldn't actually play it badly, but if we say to Dave, 'Can you try this out for us?' he'll try it, and he'll try his hardest to make it work for us."

=== New York sessions ===
In April 1996, after the London sessions ended, the band relocated to Electric Lady Studios in New York City at the behest of Gahan, who was considering moving to New York and was tired of flying to London from Los Angeles. The six week session in New York did not go well as Gahan continued to use heroin and was largely unable to produce any usable vocals. One song they were able to work on was "Sister of Night", but the vocal recording took a week, with the final vocal pieced together from many separate takes. Years later, after Gahan recovered from his addiction, he said "I can hear [in the vocal] how scared I was. I'm glad it's there to remind me."

By May 1996, the sessions had concluded and the band agreed to a three-month break, during which time Gahan agreed to see a vocal coach while Gore wrote more songs. The band had worked on seven tracks by this point, according to an interview with Simenon to KCRW-FM radio.

=== Gahan's heart attack and arrest ===
Gahan returned to Los Angeles to see his vocal coach, but also returned to using drugs. On the night of 28 May 1996, he suffered a drug-induced heart attack that stopped his heart for two minutes. Gahan later said, "I was using intravenously, but it hadn't been working for two years, so by this time I was mixing heroin with cocaine, and using so much I couldn't fill the rig up any fuller. The last time I did it I knew something was wrong and I asked my friend not to fill the rig up so much. It's a long story, but I had a heart attack." Gahan had already had one reported drug-induced heart attack in October 1993 during the Devotional Tour. Gahan's friend called paramedics, who arrived quickly and were able to revive Gahan. Said Gahan later,

I woke up in hospital hearing one of the paramedics saying, 'I think we lost him.' I sat up and said, 'No, you fuckin' haven't!' But I'd had the full cardiac arrest; my heart had stopped for two minutes. I'd been dead, basically. Later, a detective read me my rights, and I was arrested for possession of cocaine and needles. I was handcuffed to a trolley. Straight from hospital they threw me into the county jail for a couple of nights in a cell with about seven other guys – a scary experience."

Upon being released on bail by band manager Jonathan Kessler, Gahan was met by television news crews outside the county jail and said,

I'm a heroin addict, and I've been fighting to get off heroin for a year. I've been to rehab twice, and I don't wanna be like people like Kurt [Cobain]. I wanna be a survivor ... I mean, I died again last night. My cat's lives are out. I just wanna say sorry to all the fans and stuff. I'm glad to be alive ... and sorry to me mum as well. I just want them to know that it's not cool. It's not a cool thing to be an addict. You're a slave to it, and it's taken everything away from me that I love, and so I've got to rebuild my life.

Despite this statement, upon being released, Gahan continued to use heroin in his Los Angeles apartment, but after a few days he said it finally dawned on him that he was "going nowhere." The press in the UK reported on Gahan repeatedly following his arrest, with Gore and Fletcher bemoaning the near-constant coverage, with Gore saying that the press "only want to talk about drugs ... I get really depressed, thinking, 'It's always going to be like this. That's all they're ever going to talk about forever.'" At this point, Miller started to have doubts about the band, saying that at that point, "Nobody thought they were ever going to make it through that album. Even I, for the first time, wasn't sure if they were going to make it." The release date for the album, initially thought to be slated for late 1996, was officially pushed back to early 1997.

The band held an intervention and Gore gave Gahan an ultimatum: quit drugs or quit the band. Forced into rehab again, on 6 June 1996, Gahan checked into Exodus Recovery, the same rehab center Cobain had last attended before committing suicide in 1994. At this point, Gore was forced to contemplate breaking the band up and releasing the songs he had written as a solo album. The pressure from the band and the treatment at Exodus had an effect on Gahan, who said,

It changed the whole way I felt. I was sick of hurting everybody around me. I didn't want to lose my son. I didn't want him to grow up wondering why his dad killed himself. All that hit harder and harder. And suddenly I got it. There was hope. I could change. I could have a choice.

=== Los Angeles sessions ===
After a four-week stay at Exodus, Gahan was released into a court-ordered "sober living house" where he continued his recovery. During this time, he started working with Simenon and the band to continue recording tracks for Ultra. Said Fletcher, Gahan "did come good in the end. He gave up drugs and drink, got all his vocals done. He got himself together, basically."

=== Abbey Road sessions and mixing ===
Final recording for the album, including some of Gahan's vocals, were completed at Abbey Road in London between November and December 1996, where the album was mixed. With many breaks between sessions, recording for Ultra took thirteen months.

=== Additional musicians ===
Additional musicians brought in to record the album included Danny Cummings on percussion for "Useless" and "Freestate", Victor Indrizzo on percussion for "Barrel of a Gun" and "It's No Good", Jaki Liebezeit on percussion for "The Bottom Line", Keith Le Blanc on drums on "Useless", and BJ Cole for pedal steel guitar on "The Bottom Line". Their performances were sampled and edited; no guest musician played all the way through any track.

== Content ==
Lyrically, much of the album was inspired by the turmoil the band had faced throughout the 1990s. Gore said that the opening track "Barrel of a Gun" is about realising that you do not have to fit someone else's view of the world. The demo version is similar in feel to the final version, although it was recreated from scratch. The drum pattern was cut up from a loop and re-sequenced, as Gore did not want to use an unedited drum loop, but also felt that loops can provide an "immediate atmosphere".

Musically, the band explored many sounds within the realms of alternative rock but with larger electronic and trip-hop influences. The band also felt that they wanted to do something different since Alan Wilder had left the band.

"Sister of Night", "Useless" and "Insight" were the first demos to have been written. The band played these demos to Simenon when they met, and despite their simplicity he was impressed. Upon hearing the demo of "It's No Good", he considered it to be a classic Depeche Mode song. While the project started out as a small set of songs, it eventually evolved into a full album.

== Release ==
In January 1997, the band performed "Barrel of a Gun" on Top of the Pops in a performance that included Anton Corbijn on drums and Simenon on keyboards. In interviews with the press, the media would ask about Gahan's drug addiction and arrest. Gahan treated many of the interviews as a form of therapy, later regretting it, saying "At first, I thought it would be a good idea to talk about it. But I'm not so sure anymore. ... People should try and concentrate on positive things."

"It's No Good" was released as the album's second single on 31 March. Given the stress of the Devotional Tour, the band elected not to tour for Ultra, instead supporting the album's release with a live performance in London on 10 April 1997, at which they performed "Barrel of a Gun", "Useless", "It's No Good", "Home" and "Never Let Me Down Again". Ultra was released on 14 April 1997 by Mute Records in the UK. Released with catalogue number STUMM148, a promotional interview was released on CD as VERBONG2.

On 13 May, the band's official website, depechemode.com was launched to support the new album. On 16 May, the band performed a second record release party, this time in Los Angeles. That same week, performances of "It's No Good" were aired in Germany on RTL Samstag Nacht and in the US on The Tonight Show with Jay Leno.

The album went gold in Germany and was a top-five hit in eight countries, including the UK, US, Germany, and France where the album made it to number one.

On 2 October 2007 (3 October in North America), Ultra was re-released as a two-disc set, featuring a remastered version of the original album and on the second disc, a DVD which features the album in DTS 5.1, Dolby Digital 5.1 and PCM Stereo.

== Critical reception ==
Professional ratings
Review scores
Source	Rating
AllMusic	4/5 stars
Chicago Tribune	3/4 stars
Entertainment Weekly	B+
The Guardian	4/5 stars
Los Angeles Times	2.5/4 stars
NME	6/10
Pitchfork	8.4/10
Q	4/5 stars
Rolling Stone	3/5 stars
Spin	6/10

Greg Kot of the Chicago Tribune stated the album "ranks with their best work... this veteran British combo has made a disc that should please their millions of followers and provide a few guilty pleasures for the rest of us." Jim Farber in his review for Entertainment Weekly commented, "Ultra, their first work in four years, combines up-to-the-second synth effects (courtesy of producer Tim 'Bomb the Bass' Simenon) with rippling melodies—all supported by the grim sonic architecture that long ago made DM the darlings of many a sour teen. Imposing spires of synths, industrial rivets of percussion, churchy organs, and grave vocals erect an edifice of reverent dread." Writing for The Guardian, Caroline Sullivan deemed Ultra "dark even by [Depeche Mode's] standards", and on its songs, remarked that "anyone doubting the potency of pop music should hear these, then pretend they're unshaken." Rolling Stone reviewer Elysa Gardner observed a lack of "snappy singles" on Ultra but concluded that the album's "moody, pulsating ballads" are "ideal vehicles for Gahan's brooding baritone and for the band's ever-increasing sense of tender intuition."

Los Angeles Times critic Sara Scribner was less enthusiastic, finding that Depeche Mode had not progressed musically on Ultra apart from incorporating "Simenon's emotive, multilayered, high-tech sound, which would be far better suited for a subtler band but tends to wash out any hooks on this gloom-and-doom-y album." NME's James Oldham observed, "This album is at least partly the product of one of the most harrowing rock'n'roll sagas in recent memory. It's the tale of an unassuming quartet transformed into a colossal financial machine designed to bring gravitas to the masses: four cherubs from Basildon who were lauded as deities in America—only to discover they couldn't handle it... There is no dramatic reinvention, and as such we're left with an album that's every bit as flawed as its predecessors."

In a retrospective review for AllMusic, Ned Raggett stated that "Depeche delivered a strong album as a rejuvenated band" with Ultra, giving particular praise to Gahan's "new control and projection" as a vocalist. Writing for Pitchfork in 2022, Raggett described the album as "a crucial bridge between the increasing ambition of their early years and the easy confidence of their later ones."

== Track listing ==
All tracks are written by Martin L. Gore. All lead vocals by Dave Gahan, except where noted.

No.	Title	Lead vocals	Length
1.	"Barrel of a Gun"		5:35
2.	"The Love Thieves"		6:34
3.	"Home"	Gore	5:42
4.	"It's No Good"		5:58
5.	"Uselink"	instrumental	2:21
6.	"Useless"		5:12
7.	"Sister of Night"		6:04
8.	"Jazz Thieves"	instrumental	2:54
9.	"Freestate"		6:44
10.	"The Bottom Line"	Gore	4:26
11.	"Insight" (includes the hidden track "Junior Painkiller", starting at 6:27)	Gahan; Gore	8:37
Total length:			60:07

US CD and digital releases
No.	Title	Lead vocals	Length
11.	"Insight"	Gahan; Gore	6:26
12.	"Junior Painkiller"	instrumental	2:10
Total length:			60:06

=== 2007 Collectors Edition CD + DVD ===
Disc one (CD)
No.	Title	Length
1.	"Barrel of a Gun"	5:35
2.	"The Love Thieves"	6:34
3.	"Home"	5:42
4.	"It's No Good"	5:58
5.	"Uselink"	2:21
6.	"Useless"	5:12
7.	"Sister of Night"	6:04
8.	"Jazz Thieves"	2:54
9.	"Freestate"	6:44
10.	"The Bottom Line"	4:26
11.	"Insight" (includes the hidden track "Junior Painkiller", starting at 6:27)

Disc two (DVD): DTS 5.1, Dolby Digital 5.1 and PCM Stereo
No.	Title	Length
1.	"Depeche Mode: 1995–98 (Oh Well, That's the End of the Band...)" (a short film)	50:00
2.	"Barrel of a Gun"	5:35
3.	"The Love Thieves"	6:34
4.	"Home"	5:42
5.	"It's No Good"	5:58
6.	"Uselink"	2:21
7.	"Useless"	5:12
8.	"Sister of Night"	6:04
9.	"Jazz Thieves"	2:54
10.	"Freestate"	6:44
11.	"The Bottom Line"	4:26
12.	"Insight" (includes the hidden track "Junior Painkiller", starting at 6:27)

Disc 2 (DVD) additional tracks live in London, April 1997: DTS 5.1, Dolby Digital 5.1 and PCM stereo
No.	Title	Length
13.	"Barrel of a Gun"	6:00
14.	"It's No Good"	4:08
15.	"Useless"	5:23

Disc two (DVD) additional tracks: PCM Stereo
No.	Title	Lead vocals	Length
16.	"Painkiller"	instrumental	7:29
17.	"Slowblow"	instrumental	5:25
18.	"Only When I Lose Myself"		4:35
19.	"Surrender"		6:20
20.	"Headstar"	instrumental	4:25

== Personnel ==
Credits adapted from the liner notes of Ultra.

=== Depeche Mode ===
- David Gahan
- Andrew Fletcher
- Martin Gore

=== Additional musicians ===
- Kerry Hopwood – programming (all tracks)
- Dave Clayton – keyboards & keyboard programming (all tracks); string arrangements (track 3)
- Victor Indrizzo – percussion (tracks 1, 4)
- Jaki Liebezeit – percussion (track 10)
- B. J. Cole – pedal steel guitar (track 10)
- Gota Yashiki – drums (track 6)
- Keith LeBlanc – drums (track 6)
- Danny Cummings – percussion (tracks 6, 9)
- Doug Wimbish – bass (track 6)
- Daniel Miller – System 700 (track 5)
- Richard Niles – strings score, strings conducting (track 3)
- Graeme Perkins – strings coordination (track 3)

=== Technical ===
- Tim Simenon – production, mixing
- Q – mixing, engineering
- Paul Hicks – engineering assistance
- Guy Massey – engineering assistance
- Lee Fitzgerald – engineering assistance
- Tom Rixton – engineering assistance
- Gary Forde – engineering assistance
- Lee Phillips – engineering assistance
- Jamie Campbell – engineering assistance
- Jim – engineering assistance
- Greg – engineering assistance
- Audie Chamberlain – engineering assistance
- Robbie Kazandjian – engineering assistance
- Mike Marsh – mastering at The Exchange (London)
- Evelyn Halus – vocal coach
- Gareth Jones – mixing (tracks 5, 8); additional vocals engineering (tracks 2, 3, 9)

=== Artwork ===
- Anton Corbijn – art direction, photography, front cover
- Brian Dowling – colour prints
- Area – sleeve design

== Charts ==
=== Weekly charts ===
Weekly chart performance for Ultra
Chart (1997)	Peak position
Australian Albums (ARIA)	7
Austrian Albums (Ö3 Austria)	5
Belgian Albums (Ultratop Flanders)	8
Belgian Albums (Ultratop Wallonia)	1
Canadian Albums (Billboard)	2
Czech Albums (ČNS IFPI)	1
Danish Albums (Hitlisten)	3
Dutch Albums (Album Top 100)	17
European Albums (Music & Media)	1
Finnish Albums (Suomen virallinen lista)	3
French Albums (SNEP)	2
German Albums (Offizielle Top 100)	1
Greek Albums (IFPI)	1
Hungarian Albums (MAHASZ)	2
Icelandic Albums (Tónlist)	5
Irish Albums (IFPI)	4
Italian Albums (FIMI)	2
Japanese Albums (Oricon)	39
New Zealand Albums (RMNZ)	25
Norwegian Albums (VG-lista)	2
Portuguese Albums (AFP)	4
Scottish Albums (Official Charts)	7
Spanish Albums (AFYVE)	1
Swedish Albums (Sverigetopplistan)	1
Swiss Albums (Schweizer Hitparade)	4
UK Albums (Official Charts)	1
UK Independent Albums (OCC)	1
US Billboard 200	5

=== Year-end charts ===
Year-end chart performance for Ultra
Chart (1997)	Position
Austrian Albums (Ö3 Austria)	38
Belgian Albums (Ultratop Wallonia)	35
European Albums (Music & Media)	21
German Albums (Offizielle Top 100)	17
Swedish Albums & Compilations (Sverigetopplistan)	35
US Billboard 200	162

== Certifications and sales ==
Certifications and sales for Ultra
Region	Certification	Certified units/sales
Belgium (BRMA)	Gold	25,000^{*}
France (SNEP)	Gold	100,000^{*}
Germany (BVMI)	Gold	250,000^{^}
Russia	—	10,000
Spain (Promusicae)	Gold	50,000^{^}
Sweden (GLF)	Gold	40,000^{^}
Switzerland (IFPI Switzerland)	Gold	25,000^{^}
United Kingdom (BPI)	Gold	100,000^{^}
United States (RIAA)	Gold	584,000
Summaries
Europe (IFPI)	Platinum	1,000,000^{*}
Worldwide	—	4,000,000
^{*} Sales figures based on certification alone.^{^} Shipments figures based on certification alone.

== See also ==
- List of European number-one hits of 1997
- List of number-one albums of 1997 (Spain)
- List of UK Albums Chart number ones of the 1990s
