= Going Backwards =

2017 song by Depeche Mode

Single by Depeche Mode

from the album Spirit
- B-side: Various remixes; "Poison Heart"
- Released: 23 June 2017
- Recorded: 2016
- Genre: Alternative rock; synth-pop
- Length: 3:51
- Label: Columbia
- Songwriter: Martin L. Gore
- Producer: James Ford

Depeche Mode singles chronology
"Where's the Revolution" (2017)	"Going Backwards" (2017)	"Cover Me" (2017)

Music video
- "Going Backwards" (Highline sessions version) on YouTube

"Going Backwards" is a song by English electronic music band Depeche Mode from their fourteenth studio album Spirit. It was released as the album's second single on 23 June 2017. The cover art was designed by Anton Corbijn. A physical CD and vinyl release followed on 15 September 2017. A live video was released on 22 June 2017.

== Background ==
Martin Gore said in an interview with Amazon Music Germany "an album starts taking shape, for me, really, when you have about four songs together, and we had gone down a cynical path. And I thought, 'Okay well, maybe I just gotta go with this.'"

The theme of the song is the idea is about the regression of society as well as technology's role in the regression, but Gore also believed that "new technologies would bring the world together—the world would be united by them. We were all enthusiastic about the Arab Spring, when people started organizing themselves with social media and fought for their freedom. But then everything went wrong: the Middle East seems to be falling apart."

== Track listing ==
Digital download
No.	Title	Length
1.	"Going Backwards" (album version)	5:43
2.	"Going Backwards" (Highline sessions version)	5:27

CD; digital download
No.	Title	Length
1.	"Going Backwards" (radio edit)	3:51
2.	"Going Backwards" (Chris Liebing mix)	9:07
3.	"Going Backwards" (Solomun extended radio remix)	8:25
4.	"Going Backwards" (The Belleville Three full vocal mix)	6:44
5.	"Going Backwards" (Point Point remix)	4:32
6.	"Going Backwards" (Chris Liebing Burn Slow mix)	7:08
7.	"Going Backwards" (Maya Jane Coles remix)	5:57
8.	"Poison Heart" (Soulsavers re-work)	3:45

Double 12″
No.	Title	Length
1.	"Going Backwards" (Chris Liebing mix)	9:07
2.	"Going Backwards" (Solomun club remix)	7:53
3.	"Going Backwards" (The Belleville Three Deep Bass)	5:58
4.	"Going Backwards" (Chris Liebing Burn Slow mix)	7:08
5.	"Going Backwards" (Point Point remix)	4:32
6.	"You Move" (Latroit remix)	4:17
7.	"Poison Heart" (Soulsavers re-work)	3:45

Digital download – Claptone remix
No.	Title	Length
1.	"Going Backwards" (Claptone remix)	6:44

== Personnel ==
=== Depeche Mode ===
- Dave Gahan – lead vocals
- Martin Gore – guitar, keyboards, synthesizers, backing vocals
- Andy Fletcher – keyboards, synthesizers, backing vocals

=== Additional musicians ===
- James Ford – drums
- Kurt Uenala, Matrixxman – programming

== Charts ==
Weekly chart performance for "Going Backwards"
Chart (2017–2022)	Peak position
Dutch Single Tip (MegaCharts)	29
Hungary (Single Top 40)	7
US Hot Rock & Alternative Songs (Billboard)	37
