= Only When I Lose Myself =

1998 single by Depeche Mode

Single by Depeche Mode

from the album The Singles 86>98
- B-side: "Surrender"; "Headstar"
- Released: 7 September 1998
- Genre: Alternative rock; trip hop
- Length: 4:41 (album version); 4:34 (single version)
- Label: Mute
- Songwriter: Martin L. Gore
- Producers: Tim Simenon; Depeche Mode

Depeche Mode singles chronology
| "Useless" (1997) | "Only When I Lose Myself" (1998) | "Dream On" (2001) |

Music video
- "Only When I Lose Myself" on YouTube

"Only When I Lose Myself" is a song by the English electronic music band Depeche Mode. It was made exclusively for their 1998 compilation The Singles 86>98 and released as a single on 7 September 1998. It is the first non-album studio single since "It's Called a Heart" in 1985 and is also one of the rare singles to have two limited editions ("L" and "XL"—the others being "Enjoy the Silence", "In Your Room" and "Suffer Well").

== Release ==
There are two B-sides on the single. "Surrender" was the first exclusive vocal B-side since "My Joy" in 1993 from the "Walking in My Shoes" single, and the other is an instrumental titled "Headstar". A rare remix of "Painkiller" from 1997 was re-released as a B-side on some versions. The release also includes a new remix of "World in My Eyes".

== Music video ==
The music video for "Only When I Lose Myself" was directed by Brian Griffin, who had previously worked with Depeche Mode as a photographer, and did the cover art for Depeche Mode's first five albums. The soundtrack to the video is a unique version of the song, fading out at the last chorus and omitting the instrumental outro (like the radio version), but including the instrumental intro (which is missing from the radio version).

== Track listing ==
All songs were written by Martin L. Gore

UK and Australian CD1

1. "Only When I Lose Myself"
2. "Surrender"
3. "Headstar"

UK and Australian CD2; UK 12-inch single

1. "Only When I Lose Myself" (Subsonic Legacy remix)
2. "Only When I Lose Myself" (Dan the Automator remix)
3. "Headstar" (Luke Slater remix)

UK and Australian CD3

1. "Only When I Lose Myself (Gus Gus Long Play mix)
2. "Painkiller" (Kill the Pain mix – DJ Shadow vs Depeche Mode)
3. "Surrender" (Catalan FC Out of Reach mix)
4. "Only When I Lose Myself" (Gus Gus Short Play mix)
5. "World in My Eyes" (Safar mix)

UK limited-edition 12-inch single

A1. "Only When I Lose Myself (Gus Gus Long Play mix)
B1. "Painkiller" (Kill the Pain mix – DJ Shadow vs Depeche Mode)
B2. "Surrender" (Catalan FC Out of Reach mix)

UK cassette single

A1. "Only When I Lose Myself"
A2. "Surrender"
A3. "Headstar"
B1. "Only When I Lose Myself" (Subsonic Legacy remix)
B2. "Only When I Lose Myself" (Automator remix)
B3. "Headstar" (Luke Slater remix)

US and Canadian maxi-CD single (grey cover)

1. "Only When I Lose Myself" (Dan the Automator remix) – 4:56
2. "Headstar" – 4:25
3. "Surrender" – 6:17
4. "Only When I Lose Myself" (Subsonic Legacy remix) – 7:03
5. "Headstar" (Luke Slater remix) – 5:47

US and Canadian maxi-CD single (green cover)

1. "Only When I Lose Myself" (Gus Gus Longplay mix) – 11:18
2. "Painkiller" (Kill the Pain mix – DJ Shadow vs Depeche Mode) – 6:31
3. "Surrender" (Catalan FC Out of Reach mix) – 6:54
4. "Only When I Lose Myself" (Gus Gus Short Play mix) – 4:58
5. "World in My Eyes" (Safar mix) – 8:30

US 2×12-inch single

A1. "Only When I Lose Myself" (Dan the Automator remix) – 4:56
A2. "Painkiller" (Kill the Pain mix – DJ Shadow vs Depeche Mode) – 6:31
B1. "Headstar" (Luke Slater remix) – 5:47
B2. "Surrender" (Catalan FC Out of Reach mix) – 6:54
C1. "Only When I Lose Myself" (Gus Gus Longplay mix) – 11:18
C2. "Headstar" – 4:23
D1. "Only When I Lose Myself" (Subsonic Legacy remix) – 7:00
D2. "Surrender" – 6:18

== Charts ==
=== Weekly charts ===
Weekly chart performance for "Only When I Lose Myself"
| Chart (1998) | Peak position |
|---|---|
| Australia (ARIA) | 34 |
| Austria (Ö3 Austria Top 40) | 10 |
| Belgium (Ultratip Bubbling Under Flanders) | 17 |
| Belgium (Ultratop 50 Wallonia) | 37 |
| Canada (Nielsen SoundScan) | 5 |
| Canada Rock/Alternative (RPM) | 7 |
| Denmark (Tracklisten) | 1 |
| Europe (Eurochart Hot 100 Singles) | 11 |
| Finland (Suomen virallinen lista) | 4 |
| France (SNEP) | 29 |
| Germany (GfK) | 2 |
| Hungary (Mahasz) | 1 |
| Ireland (IRMA) | 28 |
| Italy (FIMI) | 3 |
| Italy Airplay (Music & Media) | 4 |
| Netherlands (Single Top 100) | 89 |
| Norway (VG-lista) | 14 |
| Scottish Singles Sales (Official Charts) | 20 |
| Spain (AFYVE) | 1 |
| Sweden (Sverigetopplistan) | 4 |
| Switzerland (Schweizer Hitparade) | 16 |
| UK Indie (Official Charts) | 4 |
| UK Singles (Official Charts) | 17 |
| US Alternative Airplay (Billboard) | 36 |
| US Billboard Hot 100 | 61 |
| US Dance Singles Sales (Billboard) | 2 |

=== Year-end charts ===
1998 year-end chart performance for "Only When I Lose Myself"
| Chart (1998) | Position |
|---|---|
| Germany (Media Control) | 77 |
| Sweden (Hitlistan) | 94 |
| US Maxi-Singles Sales (Billboard) | 13 |

1999 year-end chart performance for "Only When I Lose Myself"
| Chart (1999) | Position |
|---|---|
| US Maxi-Singles Sales (Billboard) | 44 |

== Release history ==
Release dates and formats for "Only When I Lose Myself"
| Region | Date | Format(s) | Label(s) | Ref. |
|---|---|---|---|---|
| United Kingdom | 7 September 1998 | 12-inch vinyl; CD1; CD2 | Mute | |
| United States | 15 September 1998 | CD | Mute; Reprise | |
| Canada | 22 September 1998 | CD | Mute; Reprise | |
| United Kingdom | 28 September 1998 | CD3 | Mute | |
