= Peter Gordeno (musician) =

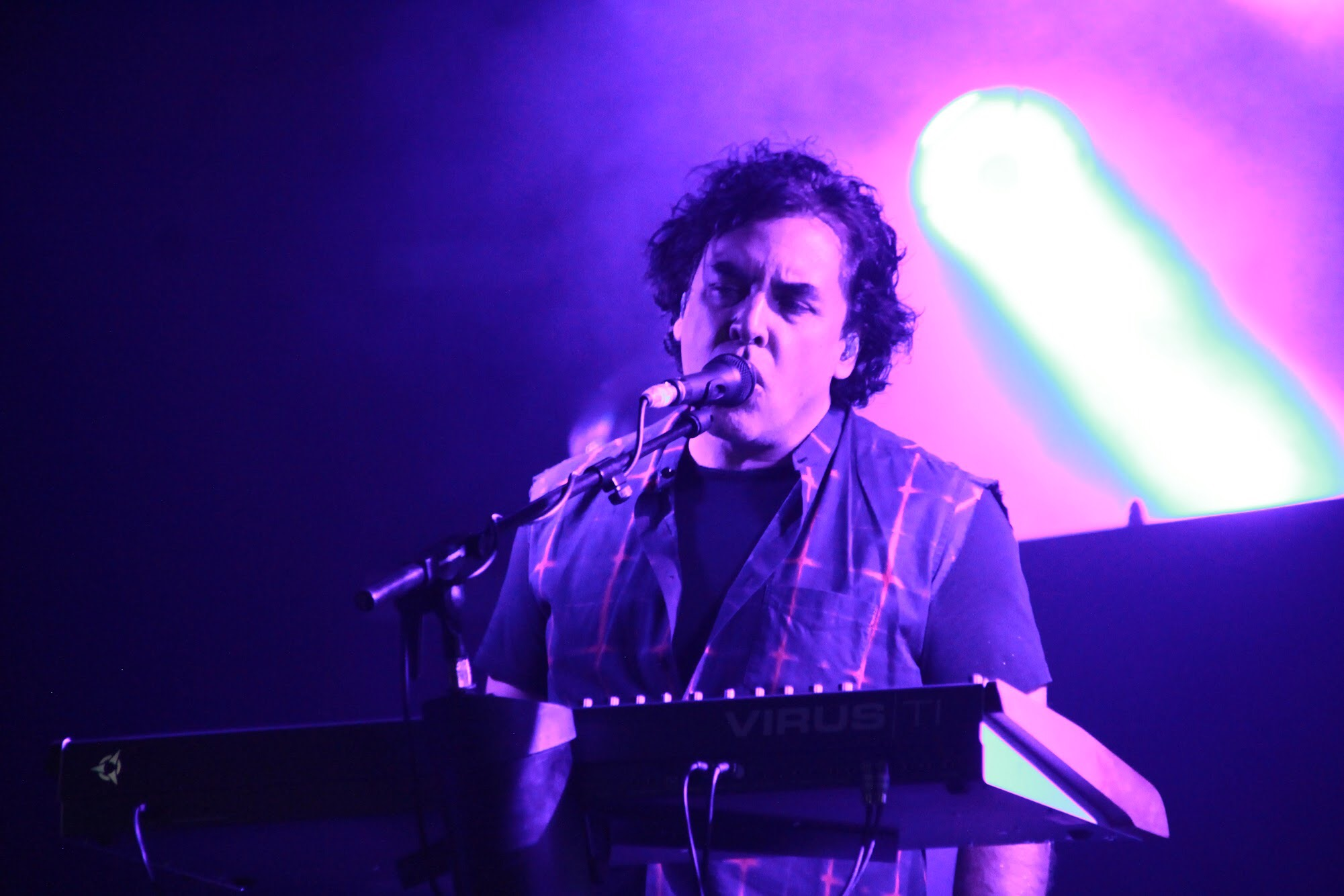
- Gordeno performing in 2017

Background information
- Born: Peter Dean Gordeno; 20 February 1964 (age 62)
- Origin: Kensington, London, England
- Genres: Alternative rock; electronic; synth-pop; alternative dance
- Instruments: Keyboards; vocals; bass

Peter Dean Gordeno (born 20 February 1964) is an English musician, songwriter and producer, who has also been a live and session musician. He has been Depeche Mode's touring keyboardist since 1998.

== Career ==
As a songwriter and producer, Gordeno has collaborated with several artists such as Seal, Il Divo, JLS, Leon Jackson and Lucie Silvas.

As a session keyboard player, arranger and musical director, he has worked with the Who, U2 and George Michael.

Since 1998, he has toured with Depeche Mode. He and Andrew Phillpott performed as backing musicians for Martin Gore on a brief tour called "A Night with Martin L. Gore" in 2003.

== Equipment ==
When touring with Depeche Mode, Gordeno uses the Roland RD-2000 Stage Piano. During the 2017–2018 Global Spirit Tour, he also used the Roland JD-XA and RD-800 in his setup. Prior to that he used the RD-700.

== Personal life ==
Gordeno is the son of the late dancer, singer and actor Peter Gordeno. He got married in 2019 in Bordeaux, France. Martin Gore of Depeche Mode performed "Somebody" at his wedding reception.
