= It's No Good =

1997 single by Depeche Mode

Single by Depeche Mode

from the album Ultra
- B-side: "Slowblow"
- Released: 31 March 1997
- Studio: Abbey Road, Eastcote, Westside, Strongroom, RAK (London, England); Electric Lady (New York City); Larrabee West (Los Angeles)
- Genre: Synth-pop; alternative rock; electropop
- Length: 5:58 (album version); 4:06 (radio edit)
- Label: Mute; Reprise
- Songwriter: Martin L. Gore
- Producer: Tim Simenon

Depeche Mode singles chronology
"Barrel of a Gun" (1997)	"It's No Good" (1997)	"Home" (1997)

Audio sample
- "It's No Good": file; help

Music video
- "It's No Good" on YouTube

"It's No Good" a song by English electronic music band Depeche Mode, released on 31 March 1997 by Mute and Reprise Records as the second single from their ninth studio album, Ultra. It was written by Martin L. Gore and produced by Tim Simenon, and was commercially successful, reaching No. 1 in Denmark, Spain, Sweden and on the US Billboard Dance Club Play chart. The single also entered the top 10 in Finland, Germany, Iceland, Israel, Italy, and the United Kingdom.

On 15 May 1997, the band went on The Tonight Show with Jay Leno and performed the song, a recording made available at the official Depeche Mode website. The B-side is an instrumental, called "Slowblow".

== Critical reception ==
Larry Flick from Billboard magazine stated that the song is "considerably more low-key" than their "more caustic" previous hit, "Barrel of a Gun". He added, "In fact, this is the single that diehard Depeche Mode disciples have been starved for, in that it somewhat revisits the stylistic days of 'Master and Servant'. The music cruises at a funky, electro-pop pace with minimal sound-effect clutter. Rather, the focus is on Dave Gahan's forlorn performance and Martin Gore's sensitive lyrics." Dominic Pride from Music & Media noted that the band "return with a sound which programmers and audiences can instantly recognise and identify with", adding that Gahan's voice "soars above the minimal electronics, which are interspersed with some spartan synth interludes, in a song that glides along smoothly to its conclusion."

Alan Jones from Music Week described it as "a superbly retro track which harks back to their old style. Powerful and synth-based, it is a sublime and slightly disturbing piece that totally contradicts its title." Later, he also declared it "a brooding and menacing monster of a track." A reviewer from Sunday Mirror wrote, "Although the first verse sounds scarily like Jimmy Nail to me, by the time the chorus sets in you recognise that proper Mode sound right away. Not as noisy as the last single but there's a stackful of harder remixes to please the mental, mental crowd".

== Legacy ==
In 2017, Billboard magazine ranked "It's No Good" number 52 in their list of "The 100 Greatest Pop Songs of 1997", writing, "The sixth and to date final top 40 hit for U.K. synth-rock greats Depeche Mode was a sleek sleaze-pop banger, delightfully cheesy enough that singer Dave Gahan pretty much had to play a lounge singer in the video. Still, the thing works because of the bass tremors unsettling the crooning underneath, and the zooming synths that crest and crash like ocean waves around Gahan, giving "It's No Good" just enough edge to keep Depeche Mode relevant amidst the rise of electronica."

== Track listings ==
All songs were written by Martin L. Gore.

- UK CD single
1. "It's No Good"
2. "Slowblow" (Darren Price mix)
3. "It's No Good" (Bass Bounce mix)
4. "It's No Good" (Speedy J mix)
- UK 12-inch single

A1. "It's No Good" (Hardfloor mix) – 6:43
A2. "It's No Good" (Speedy J mix) – 5:04
AA1. "It's No Good" (Motor Bass mix) – 3:48
AA2. "It's No Good" (Andrea Parker mix) – 6:14
AA3. "It's No Good" (Bass Bounce mix) – 7:16

- UK cassette single and US 7-inch single
1. "It's No Good" – 5:59
2. "Slowblow" – 5:25
- European CD single
1. "It's No Good" (Hardfloor mix)
2. "Slowblow"
3. "It's No Good" (Andrea Parker mix)
4. "It's No Good" (Motor Bass mix)
- US CD single
1. "It's No Good" – 6:00
2. "Slowblow" (Darren Price mix) – 6:27
3. "It's No Good" (Bass Bounce mix) – 7:15
- US and Canadian maxi-CD single
1. "It's No Good"
2. "It's No Good" (Hardfloor mix)
3. "Slowblow"
4. "It's No Good" (Speedy J mix)
5. "It's No Good" (Bass Bounce mix)
- US 12-inch maxi-single

A1. "It's No Good" (Hardfloor mix) – 6:41
A2. "It's No Good" (Bass Bounce mix) – 7:15
B1. "It's No Good" (Speedy J mix) – 5:00
B2. "Slowblow" (Darren Price mix) – 6:27

- Japanese CD single
1. "It's No Good" (original mix)
2. "Slowblow" (Darren Price mix)
3. "It's No Good" (Dom T Bass Bounce mix)
4. "It's No Good" (Speedy J mix)
5. "It's No Good" (Hardfloor mix)
6. "Slowblow" (original mix)
7. "It's No Good" (Andrea Parker mix)
8. "It's No Good" (Motor Bass mix)

== Credits and personnel ==
Credits are taken from the Ultra album booklet.

Studios

- Recorded at Abbey Road, Eastcote, Westside, Strongroom, RAK (London), Electric Lady (New York City), and Larrabee West (Los Angeles)
- Mastered at The Exchange (London)

Personnel

- Martin Gore – writing (as Martin L. Gore)
- Dave Clayton – keyboards, keyboard programming
- Victor Indrizzo – percussion
- Tim Simenon – production, mixing
- Q. – mixing, engineering
- Kerry Hopwood – programming
- Mike Marsh – mastering

== Charts ==
=== Weekly charts ===
Weekly chart performance for "It's No Good"
Chart (1997)	Peak position
Australia (ARIA)	52
Austria (Ö3 Austria Top 40)	28
Belgium (Ultratop 50 Flanders)	43
Belgium (Ultratop 50 Wallonia)	14
Canada (Nielsen SoundScan)	14
Canada Top Singles (RPM)	36
Canada Rock/Alternative (RPM)	2
Denmark (IFPI)	1
Europe (Eurochart Hot 100)	10
Finland (Suomen virallinen lista)	5
Germany (GfK)	5
Iceland (Íslenski Listinn Topp 40)	6
Ireland (IRMA)	13
Israel (Israeli Singles Chart)	3
Italy (FIMI)	1
Italy Airplay (Music & Media)	1
Mexico (Notitas Musicales)	1
Netherlands (Dutch Top 40 Tipparade)	7
Netherlands (Single Top 100)	50
Norway (VG-lista)	11
Scottish Singles Sales (Official Charts)	7
Spain (AFYVE)	1
Sweden (Sverigetopplistan)	1
Switzerland (Schweizer Hitparade)	30
UK Singles (Official Charts)	5
UK Indie (Music Week)	1
US Billboard Hot 100	38
US Adult Pop Airplay (Billboard)	31
US Alternative Airplay (Billboard)	4
US Dance Club Songs (Billboard)	1
US Dance Singles Sales (Billboard)	13

=== Year-end charts ===
Year-end chart performance for "It's No Good"
Chart (1997)	Position
Canada Rock/Alternative (RPM)	26
Germany (Media Control)	68
Romania (Romanian Top 100)	38
Sweden (Topplistan)	63
US Dance Club Play (Billboard)	48
US Modern Rock Tracks (Billboard)	28

== Certifications ==
Certifications for "It's No Good"
Region	Certification	Certified units/sales
United Kingdom (BPI)	Silver	200,000^{‡}
United States (RIAA)	Gold	500,000^{‡}
^{‡} Sales+streaming figures based on certification alone.

== Release history ==
Release dates and formats for "It's No Good"
Region	Date	Format(s)	Label(s)	Ref.
United States	19 March 1997	Modern rock radio	Reprise; Mute	
United Kingdom	31 March 1997	CD; cassette	Mute	
United States	15 April 1997	Contemporary hit radio	Reprise; Mute	
United Kingdom	21 April 1997	12-inch vinyl	Mute	
Japan	18 June 1997	CD	Mute	

== See also ==
- List of number-one dance singles of 1997 (U.S.)
- List of number-one hits of 1997 (Denmark)
- List of number-one singles of 1997 (Spain)
- List of number-one singles and albums in Sweden
