= Matrixxman =

American DJ

Matrixxman, otherwise known as Charles McCloud Duff, is an American electronic musician and DJ, born on June 14.

== Discography ==
- Identity Crisis, 2024
- Homesick Remixes, 2016
- Homesick, 2015
- StuxNet 2015
- State of Mind, 2014
- Nubian Metropolis, 2014
- The Spell EP, 2014
- Amulet, 2014
- The XX Files, Part II, 2014
- The XX Files, 2013
