= Barrel of a Gun =

1997 single by Depeche Mode

Single by Depeche Mode

from the album Ultra
- B-side: "Painkiller"
- Released: 3 February 1997
- Studio: Abbey Road, Eastcote, Westside, Strongroom, RAK (London); Electric Lady (New York City); Larrabee West (Los Angeles)
- Genre: Industrial rock; dance-rock
- Length: 5:35 (album version); 5:29 (single version); 4:00 (radio edit)
- Label: Mute
- Songwriter: Martin L. Gore
- Producer: Tim Simenon

Depeche Mode singles chronology
"In Your Room" (1994)	"Barrel of a Gun" (1997)	"It's No Good" (1997)

Music video
- "Barrel of a Gun" on YouTube

"Barrel of a Gun" is a song by English electronic music band Depeche Mode, released on 3 February 1997, by Mute Records, as the first single from their ninth studio album, Ultra (1997). The song is written by band member Martin L. Gore and produced by Tim Simenon. It reached No. 1 in the Czech Republic, Hungary, Spain and Sweden and reached the top 10 in the Denmark, Finland, Germany and the United Kingdom. In North America, the song reached No. 47 on the US Billboard Hot 100 and No. 3 on the Canadian Singles Chart. The accompanying music video was directed by Anton Corbijn and filmed in Morocco.

== Song meaning ==
Guitarist Martin Gore said, "it's about understanding what you're about and realising that you don't necessarily fit into somebody else's scheme of things." Singer Dave Gahan, who was weakened from his battle with substance abuse at the time, added, "The song sums up the way I was treating myself and everybody around me. That's what life had in store for me every day. It's a really powerful statement. When you're in that kind of row, the last thing on your mind is dying." He also described it as "probably one of the most innovative things we've ever done".

== Critical reception ==
Larry Flick from Billboard magazine wrote, "One of the true pioneering acts of electro-pop ends a lengthy break from the airwaves with a thoroughly satisfying if often caustic blend of techno synths and metallic guitars. Singer Dave Gahan has a field day digging into Martin Gore's typically heavy lyrics, comfortably swerving back and forth between hypnotic lethargy to white-knuckled intensity. Producer Tim Simenon wisely underlines the track with the kind of hip-hop motion needed to crack the pop market, while carefully weaving the instrumentation so that rockers and clubheads alike can happily jam on this one—and they will."

Dominic Pride from Music & Media noted that Depeche Mode "serve up the sombre, industrial sound for which they've become huge in Europe, but with Simenon adding some open space to the production." He added that Gahan's "distorted vocals bring a touch of Nine Inch Nails to the party." A reviewer from Music Week gave the song a score of four out of five, commenting, "After four years away, this atmospheric epic hints at an even darker approach from the 'Mode. As the first taster for their new album, this is a certain smash."

== Music video ==
The music video for "Barrel of a Gun" was shot in Morocco by Dutch photographer and director Anton Corbijn, featuring Gahan with long hair singing with his eyes closed, with eyeballs drawn on his eyelids to make it seem like they are open.

== Track listings ==
All songs were written by Martin Gore.

- UK and European CD single
1. "Barrel of a Gun"
2. "Painkiller"
3. "Barrel of a Gun" (Underworld soft mix)
4. "Barrel of a Gun" (One Inch Punch mix)
- UK and US 12-inch single

A1. "Barrel of a Gun" – 5:31
A2. "Barrel of a Gun" (Underworld hard mix) – 9:36
B1. "Barrel of a Gun" (3 Phase mix) – 5:25
B2. "Barrel of a Gun" (One Inch Punch mix (V2)) – 5:29
B3. "Barrel of a Gun" (Underworld soft mix) – 6:29

- UK limited-edition 12-inch single

A1. "Painkiller" (Plastikman mix)
A2. "Painkiller"
B1. "Barrel of a Gun" (One Inch Punch mix)
B2. "Barrel of a Gun" (United mix)

- US CD single
1. "Barrel of a Gun" – 5:30
2. "Barrel of a Gun" (United mix) – 6:34
3. "Painkiller" (original mix) – 7:28
- US 7-inch single

A. "Barrel of a Gun" – 5:30
B. "Painkiller" (original mix) – 7:28

- Canadian CD single
1. "Barrel of a Gun" (single version) – 5:29
2. "Painkiller" (Plastikman mix) – 8:39
3. "Barrel of a Gun" (Underworld soft mix) – 6:27
4. "Barrel of a Gun" (One Inch Punch mix) – 5:25
5. "Barrel of a Gun" (Underworld hard mix) – 9:36
- Australian CD single
1. "Barrel of a Gun" (Underworld hard mix)
2. "Barrel of a Gun" (United mix)
3. "Painkiller" (Plastikman mix)
- Japanese CD single
1. "Barrel of a Gun"
2. "Painkiller"
3. "Barrel of a Gun" (Underworld soft mix)
4. "Barrel of a Gun" (One Inch Punch mix)
5. "Barrel of a Gun" (Underworld hard mix)
6. "Barrel of a Gun" (United mix)
7. "Painkiller" (Plastikman mix)

== Credits and personnel ==
Credits are taken from the Ultra album booklet.

Studios

- Recorded at Abbey Road, Eastcote, Westside, Strongroom, RAK (London, England), Electric Lady (New York City), and Larrabee West (Los Angeles)
- Mastered at The Exchange (London, England)

Personnel

- Martin Gore – writing (as Martin L. Gore)
- Dave Clayton – keyboards, keyboard programming
- Victor Indrizzo – percussion
- Tim Simenon – production, mixing
- Q. – mixing, engineering
- Kerry Hopwood – programming
- Mike Marsh – mastering

== Charts ==
=== Weekly charts ===
Weekly chart performance for "Barrel of a Gun"
Chart (1997)	Peak position
Australia (ARIA)	33
Austria (Ö3 Austria Top 40)	15
Belgium (Ultratop 50 Flanders)	37
Belgium (Ultratop 50 Wallonia)	18
Canada (Nielsen SoundScan) Part One	19
Canada (Nielsen SoundScan) Part Two	3
Canada Rock/Alternative (RPM)	5
Czech Republic (IFPI CR)	1
Denmark (Tracklisten)	6
Europe (Eurochart Hot 100 Singles)	5
Finland (Suomen virallinen lista)	3
France (SNEP)	22
Germany (GfK)	3
Hungary (MAHASZ)	1
Ireland (IRMA)	13
Israel (Israeli Singles Chart)	12
Italy (FIMI)	1
Netherlands (Dutch Top 40 Tipparade)	2
Netherlands (Single Top 100)	50
Norway (VG-lista)	6
Scottish Singles Sales (Official Charts)	6
Spain (AFYVE)	1
Sweden (Sverigetopplistan)	1
Switzerland (Schweizer Hitparade)	30
UK Singles (Official Charts)	4
UK Indie (OCC)	1
US Billboard Hot 100	47
US Alternative Airplay (Billboard)	11
US Dance Singles Sales (Billboard)	5

=== Year-end charts ===
Year-end chart performance for "Barrel of a Gun"
Chart (1997)	Position
Europe (Eurochart Hot 100 Singles)	87
Germany (Media Control)	100
Sweden (Topplistan)	55
US Modern Rock Tracks (Billboard)	80

== Certifications ==
Certifications for "Barrel of a Gun"
Region	Certification	Certified units/sales
Sweden (GLF)	Gold	15,000^{^}
^{^} Shipments figures based on certification alone.

== Release history ==
Release dates and formats for "Barrel of a Gun"
Region	Date	Format(s)	Label(s)	Ref.
United Kingdom	3 February 1997	12-inch vinyl; CD	Mute	
United Kingdom	17 February 1997	Limited-edition 12-inch vinyl	Mute	
Japan	18 June 1997	CD	Mute	
