= Flood (producer) =

British record producer (born 1960)

Mark "Flood" Ellis
- Born: Mark Ellis; 16 August 1960 (age 66); London, England
- Genres: Alternative rock; post-punk; industrial; synth-pop; electronica
- Occupations: Record producer, audio engineer, musician
- Instruments: Guitar, keyboards, vocals
- Years active: 1978–present

Mark Ellis (born 16 August 1960), known by his professional pseudonym Flood, is an English record producer and audio engineer known for working with a wide range of rock and synthpop musicians.

Flood's list of work includes projects with New Order, U2, Nine Inch Nails, Marc and the Mambas, Depeche Mode, Gary Numan, Sneaker Pimps, King, Ministry, the Charlatans, Thirty Seconds to Mars, Erasure, Nick Cave and the Bad Seeds, PJ Harvey, Foals, a-ha, Orbital, Sigur Rós, the Jesus and Mary Chain, the Smashing Pumpkins, the Killers, White Lies, Pop Will Eat Itself, Warpaint, EOB, James and Interpol. His co-production collaborations have included projects with Brian Eno, Daniel Lanois, Steve Lillywhite, and longtime collaborator Alan Moulder, with whom he co-founded the Assault & Battery Studios complex. In 2006, his work with U2 led to his sharing of the Grammy Award for Album of the Year for How to Dismantle an Atomic Bomb.

== Early years ==
Mark Ellis was born in London. As a child Ellis attended St Olave's Grammar School in Orpington, England. He began his music career as the vocalist for the band Seven Hertz. In 1978 he began his professional studio career as a runner at Morgan Studios in London and was the tape operator on Rick Wakeman's album 1984. Ellis was also a runner at Battery Studios in London and held apprenticeships at Marcus Studios and Trident Studios.

== Freelance and Some Bizzare Records ==
Flood moved up to house engineer before becoming a freelance engineer in 1981, the same year he worked as assistant engineer on New Order's debut album Movement. The following year he engineered Ministry's debut album With Sympathy. He became associated with Stevo's Some Bizzare Records label, leading to him working with Cabaret Voltaire, Psychic TV, and Marc Almond's side project, Marc and the Mambas among others.

== Mute Records ==
Following his work with Some Bizzare Records, Flood began working with Mute Records as one of their preferred producers, heralding his first production project with Nick Cave and the Bad Seeds on From Her to Eternity (1983–1984) and the follow-up album The Firstborn Is Dead (1984). His work at Mute was as a producer, co-producer, or engineer with each of the label's major acts including Depeche Mode, Vince Clarke, and Erasure, whose debut album Wonderland (1986) and its follow-up The Circus (1987) he engineered.

== Mainstream commercial success ==
Flood's first major commercial breakthrough came in 1987 when he engineered U2's The Joshua Tree, collaborating with producers Brian Eno and Daniel Lanois. In that same year, he gave up mixing U2's album to produce Erasure's The Circus, the duo's second album and the first one to have great commercial success. Shortly thereafter, he co-produced Nine Inch Nails' debut album Pretty Hate Machine, along with John Fryer, Adrian Sherwood, and Keith LeBlanc. He also worked with Depeche Mode on their 1990 album Violator. In 1991, he returned to work again with U2 on Achtung Baby, along with Eno, Lanois, and Steve Lillywhite. The following year he returned to work with Depeche Mode to record the album Songs of Faith and Devotion and co-produced three tracks of Nine Inch Nails' Broken EP.

In 1993, Flood shifted from engineering U2's albums to being a producer along with Brian Eno and the Edge on Zooropa. In 1994, he worked again with Nine Inch Nails this time on The Downward Spiral. In 1995, Flood co-produced the Smashing Pumpkins' album Mellon Collie and the Infinite Sadness with longtime collaborator Alan Moulder, and PJ Harvey's album To Bring You My Love. Shortly thereafter, he assisted producer Nellee Hooper on Sneaker Pimps' Becoming X. He also collaborated with Dave Bessell, Gary Stout, and Ed Buller to create Node; an analogue synth heavy project that produced the album Node.

In 1996 Flood teamed with U2 once again to produce Pop, released the next year. The following year he assisted Billy Corgan and Brad Wood in producing the Smashing Pumpkins's 1998 album Adore and co-produced PJ Harvey's album Is This Desire?.

== 2000 to 2005 ==
In 2000, he co-produced Machina/The Machines of God by the Smashing Pumpkins with Corgan. He co-produced Erasure's Loveboat with Vince Clarke and Andy Bell of Erasure. The following year Flood worked again with Depeche Mode, remixing the single version of "Freelove", and in 2002 he produced Richard Warren's Echoboy album Giraffe. He also co-produced I To Sky, by JJ72.

In 2003, Flood re-worked Gary Numan's "Cars" for his album Hybrid. The following year, Flood produced London-based the Duke Spirit's debut album Cuts Across the Land. In the same year he co-produced U2's How to Dismantle an Atomic Bomb. In 2004 he produced Soulwax's album Any Minute Now, and in mid-2005 he mixed a-ha's eighth album, Analogue, and produced Yourcodenameis:Milo's debut album Ignoto. Later that year, Flood also mixed Placebo's album Meds.

== 2006 to 2013 ==
Flood co-produced the Killers' album Sam's Town in 2006 with fellow English producer and engineer Alan Moulder. Later that year he remixed the debut single by Dark Room Notes, "Love Like Nicotine". At the beginning of 2007, he co-produced PJ Harvey's album White Chalk with John Parish and PJ Harvey. He also co-produced a couple of songs on the Goldfrapp album Seventh Tree, which was released in February 2008. In late 2007 and early 2008, he produced Sigur Rós's Með suð í eyrum við spilum endalaust in Iceland.

Flood and Paul Hartnoll of Orbital co-produced the 2008 album by the Music, Strength in Numbers. He produced the 2009 album by the Hours, See the Light. He joined Steve Lillywhite again in 2008 to work with Thirty Seconds to Mars, on This Is War. And then worked with Editors on In This Light and on This Evening. He also collaborated with Nitzer Ebb again to finish up their first new release in over a decade, Industrial Complex. In 2010, he produced Belong by the Pains of Being Pure at Heart and Let England Shake by PJ Harvey.

In 2013, Flood worked again with Depeche Mode, being responsible for the mixing process of their album Delta Machine which was produced by Ben Hillier.

== Studios ==
Flood had a studio in Kilburn called the Bedroom. He opened the Assault & Battery studio complex with longtime recording partner Alan Moulder. In 2008, Miloco Studios opened Assault & Battery 2, a tracking and mix studio in Willesden Green. Assault & Battery 1 came under the Miloco umbrella in Summer 2009, and both Flood and Moulder remain involved with the studios, which have since been renamed Battery Studios.

== Production style ==
Billy Corgan, who worked with Flood on three albums, said:

Flood is a tremendous producer. Flood is very masterful with the sonics, but where he really shines is he's a great idea person. And I don't mean like he tells you, "Oh, put this chorus here." It's more like he can see an ambiance of the song that you don't necessarily see and he would really fight with us — not negative a fight, just he would really kind of push us to say there's another vibe here that you can get to.

== Pseudonym ==
According to producer Mark Freegard, the pseudonym "Flood" was given to Ellis by producer Chris Tsangarides during Ellis' early days at Morgan Studios while the Cure was there recording. As a young studio runner Ellis was responsible for responding to numerous requests from the recording artists and staff for tea and bacon sandwiches. Ellis kept up with the numerous requests for tea while the other runner remained largely unavailable, leading to Tsangarides nicknaming them "Flood" and "Drought," respectively.

== Selected engineering/production credits ==
Selected production credits:

- 1981: The Associates – Fourth Drawer Down
- 1981: New Order – Movement (assistant engineer)
- 1982: The Sound – All Fall Down (engineer)
- 1982: Stephen Emmer – Vogue Estate (producer)
- 1982: Marc and the Mambas – Untitled (engineer)
- 1983: Ministry – With Sympathy (engineer)
- 1983: Cabaret Voltaire – The Crackdown (co-producer)
- 1984: Nick Cave and the Bad Seeds – From Her to Eternity (engineer)
- 1985: Nick Cave and the Bad Seeds – The Firstborn Is Dead (producer, engineer)
- 1985: Depeche Mode – Shake the Disease (engineer)
- 1985: Frank Tovey – Snakes & Ladders (engineer)
- 1986: Nick Cave and the Bad Seeds – Kicking Against the Pricks (mixing)
- 1986: Crime and the City Solution – Room of Lights (co-producer)
- 1986: Erasure – Wonderland (producer)
- 1986: Nick Cave and the Bad Seeds – Your Funeral... My Trial (mixing, assistant producer, engineer)
- 1987: U2 – The Joshua Tree (engineer)
- 1987: Erasure – The Circus (producer)
- 1988: The Silencers – A Blues For Buddha (producer)
- 1988: Nick Cave and the Bad Seeds – Tender Prey (engineer)
- 1988: Book of Love – Lullaby (producer)
- 1989: Nitzer Ebb – Belief (producer)
- 1989: Nine Inch Nails – Pretty Hate Machine (engineer, programming, producer)
- 1989: Renegade Soundwave – Soundclash (producer)
- 1989: Pop Will Eat Itself – This Is the Day...This Is the Hour...This Is This! (producer, mixing)
- 1990: The Charlatans – Some Friendly (remixing)
- 1990: Nitzer Ebb – Showtime (producer, engineer)
- 1990: Depeche Mode – Violator (producer, mixer)
- 1990: Nick Cave and the Bad Seeds – The Good Son (mixing)
- 1990: Pop Will Eat Itself – Cure For Sanity (producer, mixing)
- 1991: Nitzer Ebb – As Is (mixing)
- 1991: U2 – Achtung Baby (mixing, engineer)
- 1991: Nitzer Ebb – Ebbhead (producer)
- 1992: Curve – Doppelgänger (producer, engineer)
- 1992: The Jesus and Mary Chain – Honey's Dead (engineer)
- 1992: The Charlatans – Between 10th and 11th (producer)
- 1992: Nine Inch Nails – Broken (producer)
- 1993: Depeche Mode – Songs of Faith and Devotion (producer)
- 1993: U2 – Zooropa (mixing, loops, engineer, producer)
- 1993: Curve – Cuckoo (producer)
- 1994: Tom Jones – The Lead and How to Swing It (producer)
- 1994: Nine Inch Nails – The Downward Spiral (producer, hi-hat, synthesizer)
- 1994: Cranes – Loved (mixing)
- 1995: PJ Harvey – To Bring You My Love (producer, engineer, mixing)
- 1995: Nitzer Ebb – Big Hit (engineer, programming, mixing, producer, guitar)
- 1995: The Smashing Pumpkins – Mellon Collie and the Infinite Sadness (producer)
- 1997: Nick Cave and the Bad Seeds – The Boatman's Call (mixing, producer, composer)
- 1997: U2 – Pop (producer, keyboards, mixing)
- 1998: The Smashing Pumpkins – Adore (mixing, producer)
- 1998: Barry Adamson – As Above, So Below (producer, mixing, instrumentation, theremin)
- 1998: PJ Harvey – Is This Desire? (producer)
- 2000: The Smashing Pumpkins – Machina/The Machines of God (mixing, producer)
- 2000: Erasure – Loveboat (mixing)
- 2001: New Order – Get Ready (mixing, producer)
- 2002: Echoboy – Giraffe (producer)
- 2004: U2 – How to Dismantle an Atomic Bomb (producer, mixing)
- 2005: Soulwax – Any Minute Now (mixing, producer)
- 2005: a-ha – Analogue (mixing)
- 2005: Yourcodenameis:milo – Ignoto (producer)
- 2006: Placebo – Meds (mixing)
- 2006: The Killers – Sam's Town (producer, mixing, audio production, engineer)
- 2007: PJ Harvey – White Chalk (producer, engineer, mixing)
- 2008: Goldfrapp – Seventh Tree (audio production, keyboards)
- 2008: Sigur Rós – Með suð í eyrum við spilum endalaust (engineer, producer, mixing)
- 2009: State of Play (score co-producer with Alex Heffes and additional music)
- 2009: PJ Harvey and John Parish – A Woman A Man Walked By (mixing)
- 2009: Thirty Seconds to Mars – This Is War (producer)
- 2010: The Hours – It's Not How You Start, It's How You Finish (mixing, producer)
- 2011: PJ Harvey – Let England Shake (mixing, engineer)
- 2011: The Pains of Being Pure at Heart – Belong (producer)
- 2011: Glasvegas – Euphoric Heartbreak (producer)
- 2012: Karima Francis – The Remedy (producer and mixing)
- 2012: Compact Space – Who Says It's Real (mixing)
- 2012: Goldfrapp – "Yellow Halo" and "Melancholy Sky" (co-producer and mixing)
- 2012: Orbital – Wonky (producer)
- 2013: Foals – Holy Fire (co-producer and co-mixing)
- 2013: Depeche Mode – Delta Machine (mixing)
- 2014: Warpaint – Warpaint (producer and mixing)
- 2014: U2 – Songs of Innocence (producer)
- 2015: 8:58 – 8:58 (producer)
- 2016: PJ Harvey – The Hope Six Demolition Project (co-producer and co-mixing)
- 2016: Ed Harcourt – Furnaces (producer and mixing)
- 2017: Fink – Resurgam (producer)
- 2019: White Lies – Five (co-producer and co-mixing)
- 2019: The Murder Capital – When I Have Fears (producer)
- 2019: Fink – Bloom Innocent (producer)
- 2020: EOB – Earth (producer)
- 2020: Jehnny Beth – To Love Is to Live (producer, 4 tracks)
- 2022: Interpol – The Other Side of Make-Believe (producer)
- 2023: Shame – Food For Worms (producer and mixing)
- 2023: PJ Harvey – I Inside the Old Year Dying (co-producer and co-mixing)
