= As Is (Nitzer Ebb EP) =

EP by Nitzer Ebb
- Released: 10 June 1991
- Recorded: 1991
- Studio: Worldwide International (London)
- Genre: Industrial; EBM
- Length: 19:58
- Label: Mute
- Producer: Nitzer Ebb

Nitzer Ebb chronology
Showtime (1990)	As Is (1991)	Ebbhead (1991)

As Is is an EP by industrial / EBM group Nitzer Ebb, released prior to their fourth album Ebbhead on LP, CD, and cassette by Mute Records (as MUTE122) in the United Kingdom and Geffen/MCA Records (GEF-21658) in the United States. It features four tracks, each mixed by a different artist / producer.

== Background ==
The first track, "Family Man" is the only one to feature on Ebbhead and appears here in a different form to that on the album. It was mixed by Jaz Coleman, vocalist and frontman of English post-punk band Killing Joke. The second track, "Lovesick" was mixed by Flood, who produced the band's second and third albums, Belief and Showtime as well as the previously mentioned Ebbhead. The third track, "Come Alive" was mixed by Alan Wilder of Depeche Mode, who would eventually be drafted in to co-produce Ebbhead. The last track, "Higher" was mixed by Barry Adamson and PK (also known as Paul Kendall). Barry Adamson was the bassist for Howard Devoto's Magazine and Nick Cave and the Bad Seeds while PK is an engineer/producer who has worked mainly for Mute Records on various Depeche Mode and Flood projects.

== Critical reception ==
AllMusic gave As Is a positive review, lauded the EP's cohesion despite the different producers, and concluded: "As Is sees Nitzer Ebb at the height of their abilities."

== Track listing ==
All tracks by Nitzer Ebb

1. "Family Man" – 3:56
2. "Lovesick" – 4:00
3. "Come Alive" – 6:12
4. "Higher" – 5:50

== Personnel ==
- Bon Harris – programming
- Douglas McCarthy – vocals
- Julian Beeston – additional drums and percussion
