= E Talking =

Single by Soulwax

from the album Any Minute Now
- Released: 17 January 2005
- Genre: Electronic rock; new rave; post-punk revival; dance-punk
- Length: 4:35 (album version); 3:01 (radio edit)
- Label: PIAS
- Songwriter(s): David Dewaele; Stephen Dewaele
- Producer(s): Flood

Soulwax singles chronology
"Any Minute Now" (2004)	"E Talking" (2005)	"NY Excuse" (2005)

"E Talking" is a song by Belgian electronic music duo Soulwax. It was released as the second single from their third studio album, Any Minute Now (2004), on 17 January 2005. It reached number 27 on the UK Singles Chart in 2005, marking the band's highest ever chart placement and making it their most successful single to date. A snippet of the song is featured on their 2005 album Nite Versions, through a hidden track in the pregap.

== Reception ==
The BBC included the song on its list of "Songs that shaped dance music" crediting the song with bringing the genre of EBM (electronic body music) into the mainstream and the praising duo for merging "punk, electro, techno, indie and classic rock to create something that can't be pigeonholed."

Mixmag described the song as a "Bangin' electro-rocker with bags of attack and a driving riff."

The song was used in the 2019 film Hustlers.

== Samples ==
The high pitched electronic sample used during parts of the song is a modified guitar riff from the 2001 hit "Scrood Bi U" by fellow Belgian band Lords of Acid.

== Music video ==
The music video for the song is set in a nightclub, cycling through various club-goers and listing the drugs they are on. The video goes through the entire "drug alphabet," beginning with A for Acid and ending in Z for Zoloft. It was filmed on location in London's Fabric nightclub. The video was restricted to night-time play because of its drug content.

The video was directed by Evan Bernard and was nominated for a MVPA Award.

=== Drug alphabet ===
An alphabet of drugs is listed as:

- A - Acid
- B - Barbiturates
- C - Cocaine
- D - DMT
- E - Ecstasy
- F - Fizzies
- G - GHB
- H - Heroin
- I - Ice
- J - Jumbos
- K - Ketamine
- L - Lithium
- M - Mushrooms
- N - Nitrous Oxide
- O - Opium
- P - PCP
- Q - Quaaludes
- R - Rohypnol
- S - Steroids
- T - Tetracycline
- U - Uppers
- V - Viagra
- W - Whiskey
- X - XTC
- Y - Yayo
- Z - Zoloft

== Charts ==
Chart (2005)	Peak position
Belgium (Ultratip Bubbling Under Flanders)	6
Belgium Dance (Ultratop Flanders)	3
Belgium (Ultratip Bubbling Under Wallonia)	16
Belgium Dance (Ultratop Wallonia)	3
UK Singles (OCC)	27
