= Radio Soulwax =

- Other names: RSWX; Radio SLWX
- Genre: Mixtape
- Country of origin: Worldwide
- Language: English
- Created by: Stephen Dewaele; David Dewaele; Michael Zauner; Lewis Kyle White; Bill Porter; Laurie Hill; Nuno Costa; Ed Suckling; Chris Walker; Karl Sadler; Glyn Peppiatt
- Directed by: Stephen Dewaele; David Dewaele
- Produced by: Kurt Augustyns
- Recording studio: Ghent
- Original release: 26 June 2011 – 8 May 2014
- No. of episodes: 24
- Audio format: Digital
- Website: Official site

Radio Soulwax is the former project of David and Stephen Dewaele of 2manydjs. It has taken several forms, most recently appearing as an app and web app hosting 24 individual hour-long mixes, with custom visuals similar to those used in the 2manydjs live sets.

== Background ==
The earliest incarnation of Radio Soulwax debuted on www.soulwax.com in around 2001. Initially it featured 10 mp3 playlists, sequenced like DJ sets, although more were added later.

More recently the Radio Soulwax project was revived, because they said that they came to a level that they headline festivals, they can always play for a big audience, etc. But they found at a certain moment that it began to be a bit limiting. They had a lot of musical ideas that they couldn't realise on this level, so they searched a solution. In 2009, Jan van Biesen, the head of the radio station Studio Brussel, said to the brothers "Why don't you make your own radio?". Now they claim that was the initial beginning of Radio Soulwax. Then they started scanning and encoding their whole vinyl collection: more or less 50,000 records. This job took them two and a half years.

The intro to Radio Soulwax, "Machine" was conceived and directed by Saam Farahmand, who was inspired to create an interpretation of the ethos behind the project. The result is a film that encapsulates the audio visual obsession of Radio Soulwax. The film was previsualised, edited and post produced by Andrew Daffy's The House of Curves in London. Farahmand was also the director of Part of the Weekend Never Dies, their rockumentary.

After the release of the Radio Soulwax App, The Guardian wrote:

"They are two more steps along the road to finding out how tablets and smartphones may change the way we experience music."

— Stuart Dredge, www.guardian.co.uk

== Mixes ==
This is the list of the 24 mixes (in order of release):

- Introversy (28/06/2011)
- Coverversioncovers (04/07/2011)
- Under The Covers (Live on Tour) Volume 1 (04/07/2011)
- Librarian Girl (04/07/2011)
- Blue (04/07/2011)
- Nothing Worse Than A Bad Rap (04/07/2011)
- Celestial Voyage Part 1: Quest For Orlak (04/07/2011)
- Jack In The Box (11/07/2011)
- Mehari 1 (18/07/2011)
- Hardcore Or Die (25/07/2011)
- Into The Vortex (01/08/2011)
- This Is Belgium Part 2: Cherry Moon On Valium (08/08/2011)
- Celestial Voyage Part 2: The Pink Galaxy (15/08/2011)
- Under The Covers (Live On Tour) Volume 2 (22/08/2011)
- Axe Attack (29/08/2011)
- D&SCO (05/09/2011)
- Mehari 2 (19/09/2011)
- This Is Belgium Part 1: New Beat (21/10/2011)
- Batuta Discos (31/10/2011)
- Pin Ups (17/11/2011)
- Benelux (07/12/2011)
- Under The Covers (Live On Tour) Volume 3 (19/03/2012)
- Dave (14/11/2012)
- Soulwax FM (GTA V) (2013)
- As Heard on Radio Soulwax Pt. 2 (05/08/2014)
