= This Is Radio Soulwax =

Remix album by Soulwax
- Released: February 2006
- Recorded: 2005 (mixed)
- Genre: Electronica
- Length: 48:24
- Label: Mixmag

Soulwax chronology
Nite Versions (2005)	This Is Radio Soulwax (2006)	Most of the Remixes We've Made for Other People Over the Years (2007)

This Is Radio Soulwax is a DJ mix album which was compiled and mixed by Belgian electronic band Soulwax, released in February 2006 as a covermount CD in that month's issue of Mixmag magazine in the United Kingdom.

== Track listing ==
1. Soulwax - "Slowdance" (Nite Version) - 6:25
2. Digitalism - "Idealistic" - 2:28
3. Franz & Shape - "Countach" - 3:08
4. Vitalic - "Vitalic Fanfares" - 1:54
5. Franz Ferdinand - "Do You Want To" (Erol Alkan's Glam Racket) - 1:58
6. Adam Sky - "Ape-X" - 1:58
7. Namosh - "The Pulse" (Who Made Who Remix) - 2:42
8. Riton - "Angerman" (Riton Re-Dub) - 3:13
9. Simian - "Sick" - 5:20
10. Jackson & His Computer Band - "Arpeggio" - 3:48
11. LCD Soundsystem - "Too Much Love" - 3:38
12. Tiga - "Do it Don't Stop" - 4:12
13. Headman - "Roh" - 2:06
14. Kate Wax - "Killing Your Ghost" - 3:21
15. Justice - "Let There Be Light" - 4:49
