= Oberheim Xpander =

Analogue synthesizer

Xpander
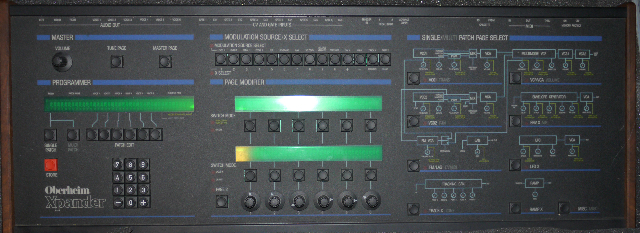
- Oberheim Xpander
- Manufacturer: Oberheim
- Dates: 1984 - 1988
- Price: US$3995

Technical specifications
- Polyphony: 6
- Timbrality: 6
- Oscillator: 2 per voice
- LFO: 5 per voice
- Synthesis type: Subtractive, FM
- Filter: 1, 2, 3, 4 pole low pass; 1, 2, 3 pole hi pass; bandpass; notch; phase shift
- Attenuator: 2 per voice
- Storage memory: 100 single patches; 100 multi patches
- Effects: none

Input/output
- Keyboard: none
- Left-hand control: none
- External control: CV/Gate; MIDI; Cassette interface

The Oberheim Xpander (/ɛksˈpændər/) is an analog synthesizer launched by Oberheim in 1984 and discontinued in 1988. It is essentially a keyboardless, six-voice version of the Matrix-12 (released a year later, in 1985). Utilizing Oberheim's Matrix Modulation technology, the Xpander combined analog audio generation (VCOs, VCF and VCAs) with the flexibility of digital controls logic.

The Xpander "Owner's Manual, First Edition" describes the technology as this:

"An analogy to the Matrix Modulation system might be all of those millions of wires that existed on the first modular synthesizers. As cumbersome as all of that wiring was, it allowed the user to connect any input to any output, resulting in sophistication and flexibility unmatched by any programmable synthesizer...until now."

== Architecture ==
=== Analog Components ===
Each of the six voices of the Xpander is completely independent. That is to say, each could be configured to create a different timbre - this is accomplished via the multi-patch mode which will be described below.

Starting at waveform generation, each voice has two voltage controlled oscillators (VCOs). Each of which is capable of generating sawtooth, triangle, pulse, or noise waveforms. Furthermore, the pulse width can be modulated as well. Although perhaps better known for subtractive synthesis, the Xpander is also capable of frequency modulation (FM) synthesis by modulating VCO #1 with VCO #2.

Moving on from the VCOs, the signal then passes through a multi-mode voltage controlled filter (VCF). The available modes on the filter are:

- one-, two-, three- and four-pole low pass
- one-, two and three-pole high pass
- two- and four-pole band pass
- two-pole notch
- three-pole phase shift
- two- and three-pole high pass plus one-pole low pass
- two-pole notch plus one-pole low pass
- three-pole phase shift plus one-pole low pass

From the filter, there are two sequential voltage controlled amplifiers (VCAs) through which the signal must pass. And finally the audio is delivered to a variety of outputs: mono, stereo and six independent outputs (corresponding to the six voices).

=== Digital Controls ===
Of those analog audio components (VCOs, VCF and VCAs), each can be modulated by several different digital controls.

- ADSR Envelopes - each voice can have up to five envelope generators. Each envelope is of the standard Attack-Decay-Sustain-Release model (ADSR), with the addition of an initial Delay phase, thus making them DADSR envelopes, to be exact.
- Low Frequency Oscillators (LFOs) - each voice can have up to five LFOs applied. Each LFO can have a different waveform: triangle, square, up-saw, down-saw, random or noise. Additionally, a sampling mode is provided, whereby an independent source (e.g. a different LFO) is sampled at a set frequency.
- Lag Generator - the lag function is similar to portamento on traditional synthesizers. However, the lag modulation in the Xpander can be applied to any control or audio signal.
- Ramp Generators - each voice can have up to four ramp generators. Similar to the attack portion of an ADSR envelope, the ramp generates a linear signal from zero to the user-defined ramp height.
- Tracking Generators - there are three tracking generators available for each voice. The tracking generator provides a mapping from a control source (e.g. key range on the keyboard, or volume pedal, or mod wheel) to a modified output, based on the user-defined settings of the generator.

== Famous users and example uses ==
- Vince Clarke - On everything by Erasure until 2005. You can hear it very clearly on the 12" mix of "Sexuality", for example, at the start, and mid and low end parts (filter sweeps, etc.). He actually has two of them, and used them for the chorus tour in 1991 - 1992, which was mostly old analog synths. On early tours the Xpander was introduced as a member of the band as can be heard on live versions of Oh L'amour.
- Sasha - Whose track "Xpander" was written in homage to the instrument. That supersaw style sound, originated using the Xpander's filtering and multi/unison and stacking capabilities.
- Nitzer Ebb - Extensive use for basslines on Belief.
- Depeche Mode - Have two of them, and can clearly be heard on everything from "It's Called a Heart" and Black Celebration onwards
- Steve Roach - Everything from Empetus (1986) on.
- Daniel Miller - Has one in the Mute worldwide programming studio
- Human League - All over the mid 80's period & onward albums
- Hans Zimmer - Sprinkled on various scores for films.
- Orbital - Everything from the first self-titled album onward
- Tangerine Dream - Everything from Le Parc onward.
- The Chemical Brothers - Can be heard in a lot of their music post-1995
- Meat Beat Manifesto - In a lot of their remixes
- Todd Tamanend Clark - From 1985 to the present.
- Nine Inch Nails - Including an Xpander modified for use with external inputs
- Clarence Jey
- Die Krupps
- MNDR - Feed Me Diamonds album
- Ceephax Acid Crew- Used on multiple tracks.
- Ray Lynch
- Jam & Spoon - Used on the track Stella
- Michael Brecker Used on many recordings as the sound module for his EWI (Electronic Wind Instrument)
