= Big Hit =

Big Hit may refer to

- The Big Hit, a 1998 film
- Big Hit (album), a 1995 album by Nitzer Ebb
- Big Hit Music, a South Korean music record label
