= Countach (disambiguation) =

Countach may refer to:

== Vehicles ==
- Lamborghini Countach (1974-1990), a production supercar from Lamborghini
- Lamborghini Countach LPI 800-4 (2022), a limited-production sportscar from Lamborghini
- Lamborghini Countach QVX (1985), a Group-C racecar

== Music ==
=== Albums ===
- Countach (album), a 2008 album by 'The Cassettes'
- Countach (For Giorgio), a 2016 album by 'Shooter Jennings'

=== Songs ===
- "Countach" (single), a 2025 single by Todoroki Hajime
- "Countach" (song), a 2018 song by Jean Rodríguez off the album Coastcity
- "Countach" (song), a 2016 song by 'Shooter Jennings' off the album Countach (For Giorgio)
- "Countach" (song), a 2015 song by Ratatat off the album Magnifique (album)
- "Countach" (single), a 2008 single by 'W&W'; see W&W discography
- "Countach" (song), a 2005 song by "Franz & Shape" off the 2006 'Soulwax' album This Is Radio Soulwax

== Other uses ==
- Countach (2004–2012), a Japanese manga serialized comic by Haruto Umezawa

== See also ==
- Lamborghini V12, the engine from the Countach (1974-1990) referred to as the Countach engine
- "The County Countach", nickname of Jordan Brown (snooker player)
