= Ebbhead =

Studio album by Nitzer Ebb
- Released: 30 September 1991
- Recorded: May–July 1991
- Genres: EBM; industrial metal
- Length: 44:14
- Labels: Mute (UK); Geffen/MCA (US)
- Producers: Alan Wilder; Flood

Nitzer Ebb chronology
As Is (1991)	Ebbhead (1991)	Big Hit (1995)

Singles from Ebbhead
- 1. "I Give to You" Released: 27 August 1991; 2. "Godhead" Released: 30 December 1991; 3. "Ascend" Released: 30 March 1992

Ebbhead is the fourth studio album by British EBM group Nitzer Ebb. Co-produced by Depeche Mode's Alan Wilder in collaboration with Flood, it was released by Mute Records on 30 September 1991.

== Background ==
The album features a continuation of their industrial sound with the inclusion of metal guitars for the first time, notably featured on the single "Godhead" as well as the "Family Man" remix. According to the band, all the guitar parts featured were recorded samples.

Flood and Wilder convinced the band to incorporate other musicians on the album. Said Wilder, "We got, for the first time for them [Nitzer Ebb], we got a fourteen-piece string and bass section in to come and play on the album," calling the move "quite adventurous" because the band hadn't tried that before.

== Reception ==
Professional ratings
Review scores
Source	Rating
AllMusic	3/5 stars
Music from the Empty Quarter	Favourable
NME	7/10
Q	3/5 stars

The album was met with a mixed to positive review by AllMusic's Ned Raggett, who credited the album in progressing their sound to feature more melody and the use of traditional song structures as opposed to their earlier sound. Overall, summarizing the album as a mixed affair with notable high points.

== Track listing ==
1. "Reasons" – 4:17
2. "Lakeside Drive" – 3:59
3. "I Give to You" – 5:10
4. "Sugar Sweet" – 3:21
5. "DJVD" – 4:20
6. "Time" – 4:53
7. "Ascend" – 5:19
8. "Godhead" – 4:29
9. "Trigger Happy" – 4:22
10. "Family Man" (remix) – 3:58

== Personnel ==
=== Nitzer Ebb ===
- Bon Harris – composer
- Douglas McCarthy – composer, vocals
- Julian Beeston – drums, percussion

=== Production/other ===
- Producers: Alan Wilder, Flood
- Engineer: Steve Lyon
- Mixing: Alan Wilder and Steve Lyon
- Orchestration arrangements: Andrew Poppy (track 3)
- Vocal sample: Jerry McCarthy Clemance (track 4)
