= All Systems Are Lying =

Studio album by Soulwax
- Released: 17 October 2025
- Genres: Alternative dance; electronic rock; electroclash
- Length: 46:54
- Label: Because Music
- Producer: Soulwax

Soulwax chronology
Deewee Sessions, Vol. 1 (2020)	All Systems Are Lying (2025)

Professional ratings
Aggregate scores
Source	Rating
Metacritic	79/100
Review scores
Source	Rating
DIY	4/5 stars
Mojo	4/5 stars
PopMatters	7/10
Record Collector	4/5 stars
Slant Magazine	2.5/5 stars
The Skinny	4/5 stars
Uncut	8/10
Under the Radar	8/10

All Systems Are Lying is the sixth studio album by Belgian electronic music duo Soulwax, released on 17 October 2025, and is their first album in seven years, following Essential (2018). The album is an electronic and alternative rock album made entirely without electric guitars, but rather with a combination of modular synthesizers, live drums, and processed vocals, while exploring themes of technology, societal paranoia, and the modern digital landscape.

== Track listing ==
No.	Title	Length
1.	"Pills and People Gone"	2:59
2.	"Run Free"	4:40
3.	"Meanwhile on the Continent"	1:44
4.	"New Earth Time"	4:06
5.	"All Systems Are Lying"	3:21
6.	"Gimme a Reason"	6:42
7.	"Dshungel"	0:23
8.	"Constant Happiness Machine"	2:32
9.	"Polaris"	4:33
10.	"The False Economy"	4:14
11.	"Idiots in Love"	4:41
12.	"Hot Like Sahara"	3:11
13.	"Engineered Fantasy"	2:15
14.	"Distant Symphony"	1:33
Total length:		46:54

== Charts ==
Chart (2025)	Peak position
Belgian Albums (Ultratop Flanders)	3
Belgian Albums (Ultratop Wallonia)	10
