= Goose (Belgian band) =

Belgian electronic rock band

GOOSE
- Origin: Kortrijk, Belgium
- Genres: Dance-punk, electronic rock
- Years active: 2000–present
- Labels: Skint, !K7, Universal, Safari
- Members: Mickael Karkousse; Dave Martijn; Tom Coghe; Bert Libeert
- Website: www.goosemusic.com

GOOSE is a Belgian electronic rock band consisting of members Mickael Karkousse, Dave Martijn, Tom Coghe, and Bert Libeert.

== History ==
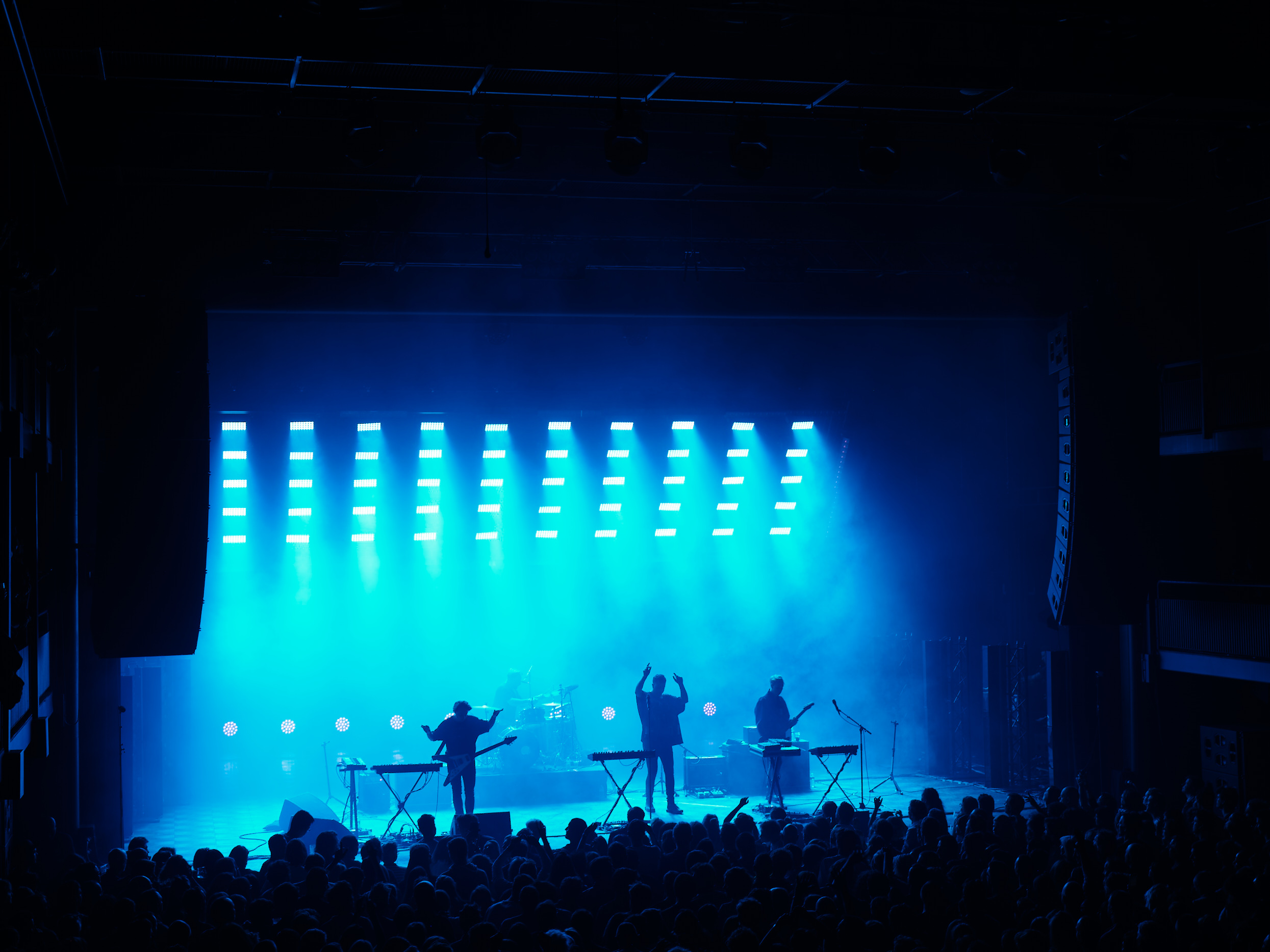
GOOSE on stage

GOOSE was formed in the summer of 2000 in Kortrijk, Belgium. They started writing and recording their own songs, heavily incorporating synthesizers into them. They won Humo's Rock Rally in 2002 and later that year recorded their debut single "Audience" with Teo Miller. Coca-Cola used their debut single for TV adverts across Europe.

They were signed to Skint Records and their debut album Bring It On was released on September 11, 2006. They toured intensively through Europe, and played shows in Australia and Japan.

GOOSE released their second album Synrise on 18 October 2010. The first single of this album is called "Words" and was aired on radio for the first time on 10 August 2010. The title song "Synrise" was remixed by Mumbai Science, Housemeister, Paul Chambers and Soulwax. Jef Neve, a famous Belgian jazz pianist made a classical piano version of this song. The song "Synrise" also appeared in the Dior campaign presenting the Ready-to-Wear Fall collection 2013. The artwork for this album was made by legendary Storm Thorgerson. In January 2011 they won two (Flemish) Music Industry Awards, for best dance/electronical music and best artwork.

The third album Control Control Control was released on 8 April 2013 in the UK. It was recorded live in the studio, by Paul Stacey (Noel Gallagher) and Dave Sardy (Oasis, ZZ Top). It was very well received- The Guardian even described them as an "onstage powerhouse, successfully bridging the gap between electronic music and rock" - and they had the chance to headline big festivals such as Rock Werchter, Pukkelpop and I Love Techno. For this festival they could even host a whole room. The line-up for this room was filled with friends of theirs like The Bloody Beetroots, Digitalism, Gesaffelstein, Annie Mac and DJ Falcon.

Their fourth album What You Need was recorded in Los Angeles with Jason Falkner and was released on April 4, 2016. Cover art was by fashion photographer Willy Vanderperre.

== Discography ==
=== Albums ===
- Bring It On | Skint Records (11 September 2006)
- Synrise | !K7 Records (18 October 2010)
- Control Control Control| | Safari Records/Universal Music (12 October 2012)
- What You Need | Safari Records/Universal Music (4 April 2016)
- Something New | Safari Records/Universal Music (26 february 2021)
- Endless | Safari Records/Universal Music (11 March 2022)

=== Singles ===
- "Audience" (2002)
- "Good Times" (2004)
- "Black Gloves", Skint Records (2006)
- "British Mode", Skint Records (2006)
- "Low Mode", Skint Records (2007)
- "Bring It On", Skint Records (2007)
- "Words", !K7 Records (2010)
- "Can't Stop Me Now", !K7 Records (2010)
- "Synrise", !K7 Records (2011)
- "Synrise", Music Mania Records (12" picture disc by Storm Thorgerson, exclusive Soulwax remix)
- "Real" (2012)
- "Control" (2012)
- "Your Ways" (2013)
- "So Long" (2016)
- "What You Need" (2016)
- "Trip ft. SX" (2017)
- "Circles" (2018)
- "Something New" (2019)
- "Girls Who Act Like Boys" (2019)
- "Heaven" (2020)
- "Viper" (2020)
- "Losing You" (2020)
- "Endless" (2022)
- "Change" (2022)
- "Fear Of Letting Go" (2022)
- "Run Away" (2022)
- "Rock" (2023)
- "Get It Started" (2023)

=== Remixes ===
==== By Goose ====
- SX - "Gold"
- Purple Haze - "You & Me"
- Scissor Sisters - "She's My Man"
- Shitdisco - "I Know Kung Fu"
- White Lies (band) - "There Goes Our Love Again"
- Mixhell - "Highly Explicit"
- Daft Punk - "Son Of Flynn"
- Martin Solveig - "C'est La Vie"
- Jamaica - "Short and Entertaining"
- Jessie Ware - "Night Light (Unofficial)"

==== For Goose ====
- The Bloody Beetroots - "Black Gloves"
- The Bloody Beetroots - "Can't Stop Me Now"
- The Bloody Beetroots - "Everybody"
- Soulwax - "Synrise"
- Maxim Lany - "Girls Who Act Like Boys"
- Cellini - "Words"
- Jef Neve - "Synrise (piano version)"
- John Noseda - "Something New".
- Whitesquare - "Losing You"
- B-Sights - "What You Need"
- Simon Le Saint - "Call Me"
- Doganov - "What You Need"
- Digitalism - "What You Need"
- B1980 - "Girls Who Act Like Boys"
- Theus Mago - "Viper"
- Jester - "British Mode"

== Music in TV shows and films ==
=== TV shows ===
- "Check": CSI: NY, Season 3, Episode 1 ("People with Money") (2006)
- "Trendsetter": Chuck, Season 1, Episode 7 ("Chuck vs. the Alama Mater") (2007)
- "Bring It On": Dirty Sexy Money
- "Audience": CSI: Miami, Season 6, Episode 10 ("CSI: My Nanny") (2008)
- "Synrise (Soulwax remix)": Used to advertise Season 2 of Utopia on Channel 4 in the UK (2014)
- "Synrise": Elite, Season 6, Episode 1 ("Anxiety") (2022)

=== Films ===
- "Black Gloves": Wild Child (2008)
- "Black Gloves": Whip It (2009)
- "Black Gloves": Trailer Blitz (2011)
- "Synrise": Move On (2012)

== Music in games ==
- "Black Gloves": Project Gotham Racing 4 (2007)
- "Check": Gran Turismo 5 and "Words (Jester Dub) (GT5 Edit)": Gran Turismo 5 (2010)
- "Synrise (Soulwax Remix)": Grand Theft Auto V (2013) on the Soulwax FM radio station
