= Industrial complex (disambiguation) =

Industrial complex may refer to:

- Industrial complex, a socioeconomic concept
- Industrial Complex (album), a 2010 album by Nitzer Ebb
- Industrial park, an area zoned and planned for the purpose of industrial development
- Factory, a collection of buildings relating to industrial production

== See also ==
- List of industrial complexes
