= Narcissus Road =

Studio album by The Hours
- Released: 5 February 2007
- Recorded: 2006
- Studio: Tick Tock Studios; State of the Ark, Richmond, Surrey; Sunset Sound, Hollywood, California; Abbey Road Studios, London
- Genre: Indie rock
- Length: 51:05
- Label: A&M
- Producer: The Hours

The Hours chronology
Narcissus Road (2007)	See the Light (2009)

Professional ratings
Review scores
Source	Rating
AllMusic	3/5 stars
The Guardian	4/5 stars

Narcissus Road is the debut album by English indie rock band the Hours. It is named after a road in West Hampstead, London NW6; a picture of the road sign is on the back cover.

== Track listing ==
All tracks composed by Antony Genn and Martin Slattery; except where indicated

1. "Ali in the Jungle" – 4:38
2. "Narcissus Road" – 3:50
3. "Back When You Were Good" (Genn, Slattery, Joey Waronker) – 5:29
4. "Love You More" – 3:06
5. "Icarus" – 3:30
6. "I Miss You" – 4:13
7. "Murder or Suicide" – 5:55
8. "Dive In" – 3:34
9. "I Need to Know" – 5:03
10. "People Say" – 6:28
11. "Let Me Breathe" – 5:14

== Notes ==
The artwork for the album was created by British artist Damien Hirst.

Themes of the album include ruminations on the celebrities that songwriters Antony Genn and Martin Slattery have known in their previous careers as musicians, such as on the title track; love songs such as "Love You More"; uplifting exhortations to achieve, such as in "Ali in the Jungle"; and references and metaphors related to football.

"Ali in the Jungle" is the soundtrack to the Nike short film "Human Chain," which debuted as an advertisement during the 2010 Winter Olympics.

The song "Ali in the Jungle" was also featured in the EA Sports video game FIFA 08 and the 2K Sports game NBA 2K13

== Singles & EPs ==
=== Ali in the Jungle ===
- Released 6 November 2006
- UK Singles Chart: #113

CD and 7" vinyl

1. "Ali in the Jungle"
2. "Nothing"
3. "Greatest Comeback"
4. "Ali in the Jungle"

=== Love You More ===
- Released 1 November 2007
- UK Singles Chart: #194

=== Back When You Were Good ===
- Released 22 January 2007
- UK Singles Chart: #?

CD and 7" vinyl

1. "Back When You Were Good"
2. "For a Moment"
3. "Back When You Were Good"
