= Any Minute Now (Soulwax album) =

Studio album by Soulwax
- Released: 23 August 2004
- Recorded: 2003–2004
- Genres: Electronic rock; new rave; dance-punk revival
- Length: 49:15
- Label: PIAS
- Producer: Flood

Soulwax chronology
Much Against Everyone's Advice (1998)	Any Minute Now (2004)	Nite Versions (2005)

Singles from Any Minute Now
- 1. "Any Minute Now" Released: 9 August 2004; 2. "E Talking" Released: 17 January 2005; 3. "NY Excuse" Released: 27 June 2005

Professional ratings
Review scores
Source	Rating
AllMusic	4/5 stars
BBC	(positive)
The Observer	3/5 stars
Stylus	C−

Any Minute Now is the third studio album by Belgian electronic music duo Soulwax, released on 23 August 2004 through PIAS Recordings. It peaked at number 53 on the UK Albums Chart. All three singles from the album, "Any Minute Now", "E Talking" and "NY Excuse", reached the top 40 of the UK Singles Chart. Most of the tracks on Any Minute Now were remixed on Soulwax's follow-up record, 2005's Nite Versions.

Like on most CDs from Soulwax and 2 Many DJs, an untitled hidden track can be heard by rewinding before the start of the first track. A version of this hidden track appeared on Nite Versions as "I Love Techno".

== Track listing ==
No.	Title	Length
0.	"I Love Techno" (hidden pregap track)	5:31
1.	"E Talking"	4:35
2.	"Any Minute Now"	3:07
3.	"Please... Don't Be Yourself"	3:42
4.	"Compute"	4:44
5.	"KracK"	2:32
6.	"Slowdance"	4:23
7.	"A Ballad to Forget"	2:37
8.	"Accidents and Compliments"	4:32
9.	"NY Excuse"	4:48
10.	"Miserable Girl"	3:41
11.	"YYY/NNN"	4:00
12.	"The Truth Is So Boring"	4:48
13.	"Dance 2 Slow"	1:46
Total length:		49:15

== Charts ==
Chart (2004)	Peak position
Belgian Albums (Ultratop Flanders)	2
Belgian Albums (Ultratop Wallonia)	11
Dutch Albums (Album Top 100)	6
French Albums (SNEP)	64
German Albums (Offizielle Top 100)	76
UK Albums (Official Charts)	53
