= Karima Francis =

English singer-songwriter

- Born: Karima Antoinette Francis Cunliffe; 28 April 1987 (age 39); Blackpool, England
- Genres: Alternative
- Occupations: Singer-songwriter, drummer
- Instruments: Vocals, Guitars, Drums, Keys, Producer
- Years active: 2009– present
- Labels: Kitchenware Records; Columbia Records; Vertigo Records; Universal

Karima Francis (born Karima Antoinette Francis Cunliffe, 28 April 1987 in Blackpool, England) is an English singer-songwriter.

Karima was named by The Observer the number one act to watch in 2009. After performing at In The City in Manchester and SXSW in Austin they were signed by the independent record label Kitchenware Records/Columbia Records. They signed with Vertigo Records, a division of Mercury Music Group, in 2011.

They released their first album, The Author, on 23 March 2009, The record was produced by Kevin Bacon and Jonathan Quarmby. The Author was mixed by Micheal Brauer and mastered by Bob Ludwig.

Notable performances include appearing on Later With Jools Holland, supporting Paul Simon on the main stage at Hard Rock Calling, shows with Amy Winehouse, Patti Smith and Stereophonics, as well as playing The Royal Albert Hall in support of Teenage Cancer Trust.

Their second album, The Remedy, was released in August 2012, and produced by Flood.

They recorded their third studio album Black (2016), which was produced by Dan Austin.

== Discography ==
Studio albums

- The Author (2009)
- The Remedy (2012)
- Black (2016)
