= Big Hit (album) =

Studio album by Nitzer Ebb
- Released: 27 March 1995
- Genre: Electronic; industrial rock; industrial metal
- Length: 44:04
- Label: Mute (UK); Geffen/MCA (US)
- Producer: Flood

Nitzer Ebb chronology
Ebbhead (1991)	Big Hit (1995)	Body of Work (2006)

Singles from Big Hit
- 1. "Kick It" Released: 20 February 1995; 2. "I Thought" Released: 24 April 1995

Professional ratings
Review scores
Source	Rating
AllMusic	2.5/5 stars
The Encyclopedia of Popular Music	3/5 stars
Music From the Empty Quarter	favourable

Big Hit is the fifth studio album by British EBM group Nitzer Ebb. It was released by Mute Records in 1995. The album included two singles, "Kick It" and "I Thought". The album is a great departure from the previous albums EBM stylings, featuring a heavy influence from alternative rock and a greater emphasis on more traditional instruments. Big Hit was the band's final release for Mute until its 2006 retrospective, Body of Work.

== Critical reception ==
CMJ New Music Monthly called the album "catchy, sinister and subversive", writing that "it's an 'industrial' album that plays through the whole range of emotions and textures instead of just high-tech rage". The Quietus called the album "unfairly maligned".

== Track listing ==
1. "Cherry Blossom" – 5:30
2. "Hear Me Say" – 4:07
3. "Kick It" – 3:39
4. "I Thought" – 5:16
5. "Floodwater" – 3:35
6. "Bordertalk" – 3:25
7. "In Decline" – 5:36
8. "Living Out of a Bag" – 5:41
9. "Boy" – 4:17
10. "Our Own World" – 5:37

== Personnel ==
=== Nitzer Ebb ===
- Douglas Mccarthy – vocals, composer, guitars, programming
- Bon Harris – vocals, composer, bass, guitars, percussion, programming

=== Production/other ===
- Flood – engineering, guitars, mixing, production, programming
- Al Clay – production on "Border Talk"
- Dr. Know – guitar on "Kick It"
