= That Total Age =

Studio album by Nitzer Ebb
- Released: 11 May 1987
- Recorded: 1986–1987
- Genres: Industrial; EBM
- Length: 48:15
- Labels: Mute; Geffen
- Producer: Phil Harding

Nitzer Ebb chronology
Warsaw Ghetto/So Bright So Strong (1985)	That Total Age (1987)	Belief (1989)

Singles from That Total Age
- 1. "Let Your Body Learn" Released: 23 May 1986; 2. "Murderous" Released: 1 November 1986; 3. "Let Your Body Learn" Released: 13 April 1987; 4. "Join in the Chant" Released: 10 August 1987

That Total Age is the debut studio album by the British musical group Nitzer Ebb. After its release, it spawned the hit single "Join in the Chant", which hit No. 9 on the US dance chart in 1987. The song "Warsaw Ghetto", which was originally released as a standalone single, was included as an extra track on vinyl/cassette by Geffen Records for releases in the USA and Canada. The 2018 remastered releases by Pylon Records also includes this track, in addition to other remixes.

The symbols on the cover of the album stand for "Force is Machine", "Visions of Order", and "Muscle and Hate". Two of these phrases can be heard repeated in the song "Join in the Chant".

== Critical reception ==
Professional ratings
Review scores
Source	Rating
AllMusic	4/5 stars

In 2003, Spin included the album on its list of "Essential Industrial".

== Track listing ==
LP: Mute Stumm 45 (UK)|Geffen/Warner Bros. 24155

1. "Fitness to Purpose" – 5:00
2. "Warsaw Ghetto" – 3:47 (only on Geffen vinyl/cassette releases)
3. "Violent Playground" – 3:46
4. "Murderous" – 5:40
5. "Smear Body" – 5:40
6. "Join in the Chant" – 6:05
7. "Alarm" – 3:41
8. "Let Your Body Learn" – 2:48
9. "Let Beauty Loose" – 2:24
10. "Into the Large Air" – 4:13
- also released on 2xLP (L STUMM 45)

CD: Mute Stumm 45 (UK)|Geffen/Warner Bros. 24155

1. "Fitness to Purpose" – 5:03
2. "Violent Playground" – 3:49
3. "Murderous" – 5:43
4. "Smear Body" – 5:49
5. "Join in the Chant" – 6:05
6. "Alarm" – 3:41
7. "Let Your Body Learn" – 2:48
8. "Let Beauty Loose" – 2:24
9. "Into the Large Air" – 4:13
10. "Join in the Chant" (Metal Mix) – 5:16
11. "Fitness to Purpose" (Mix Two) – 4:56
12. "Murderous" (Instrumental) – 5:04
