= RSF Kobol =

Synthesizer

- Manufacturer: RSF
- Dates: RSF Kobol 1978, Kobol Rack (Expander): 1979
- Price: 550 Euros

Technical specifications
- Polyphony: Monophonic
- Timbrality: 1 Part
- Oscillator: 2 VCO's; triangle, square, saw, pulse; variable sweep
- LFO: 1 LFO, triangle, square waveforms
- Filter: 1 VCF, 24db low pass
- Storage memory: 16 Memory slots
- Effects: Decay

Input/output
- Keyboard: 44 Full Size keys
- External control: CV for VCO, CV for VCF, gate control, clock trigger input, external audio process line input

The RSF Kobol is a French monophonic synthesizer released in 1978, described by some as "the French Minimoog". It could process external sounds through the envelope and filter section. It was created by Ruben and Serge Fernandez. Fewer than 200 were made as they were not mass-produced. The Kobol is a very versatile instrument, offering many sought-after features of other analogue synthesizers of its time.

== Rack Mount ==
A rack-mount system was released in 1979. There were four different types: The Kobol Rack (Expander I) was only the VCO/VCF/VCA/LFO sections of the Kobol in a rack module. The Expander 2 was an add-on to the Kobol that added new processing modules such as ring modulation, sample-hold, and envelope followers as well as extra VCA and LFO modules.

== Best Known for Sounds ==
"Fat" basses and convincing percussions and leads.

== Notable users ==
- Jean-Michel Jarre
- Hans Zimmer
- Vince Clarke
- Vangelis
- Peter Gabriel
- Depeche Mode
- Nitzer Ebb
