= From Deewee =

Studio album by Soulwax
- Released: 24 March 2017
- Genre: Synth-pop
- Length: 49:05
- Labels: PIAS Recordings, Deewee
- Producer: Soulwax

Soulwax chronology
Belgica (soundtrack) (2016)	From Deewee (2017)	Essential (2018)

Professional ratings
Aggregate scores
Source	Rating
AnyDecentMusic?	6.6/10
Metacritic	69/100
Review scores
Source	Rating

From Deewee is the fourth studio album by Belgian electronic music duo Soulwax, released on 24 March 2017. With a length of 48 minutes, the album was recorded in one take by the Dewaele brothers along with three drummers. Besides the normal members of Soulwax, there is Laima Leyton on keys, Igor Cavalera, Blake Davies and Victoria Smith on drums. The first single from the album was "Transient Program for Drums and Machinery".

The concept for the album was taken from Transient Program for Drums and Machinery, a live show they did in 2016.

== Track listing ==
Track listing taken from iTunes.

No.	Title	Length
1.	"Preset Tense"	1:31
2.	"Masterplanned"	4:07
3.	"Missing Wires"	4:48
4.	"Conditions of a Shared Belief"	3:12
5.	"Is It Always Binary"	3:29
6.	"Do You Want to Get Into Trouble?"	4:26
7.	"My Tired Eyes"	4:17
8.	"Transient Program for Drums and Machinery"	6:23
9.	"Trespassers"	4:04
10.	"The Singer Has Become a Deejay"	3:21
11.	"Here Come the Men in Suits"	5:10
12.	"Goodnight Transmission"	4:07
Total length:		49:05

== Charts ==
=== Weekly charts ===
Chart (2017)	Peak position
Belgian Albums (Ultratop Flanders)	1
Belgian Albums (Ultratop Wallonia)	29
Dutch Albums (Album Top 100)	46
Swiss Albums (Schweizer Hitparade)	91

=== Year-end charts ===
Chart (2017)	Position
Belgian Albums (Ultratop Flanders)	26
