= Leave the Story Untold =

Studio album by Soulwax
- Released: 10 May 1996
- Genres: Alternative rock; post-grunge
- Length: 58:08
- Label: Play It Again Sam
- Producers: Chris Goss; Soulwax

Soulwax chronology
Leave the Story Untold (1996)	Much Against Everyone's Advice (1998)

Singles from Leave the Story Untold
- 1. "Kill Your Darlings" Released: 18 March 1996; 2. "Caramel" Released: 8 July 1996; 3. "Great Continental Suicide Note" Released: 16 December 1996

Professional ratings
Review scores
Source	Rating
AllMusic	3/5 stars

Leave the Story Untold is the debut album by Belgian alternative dance band Soulwax, first released on 10 May 1996 and re-released a decade later once the band had found new fans with their work under the guise of 2ManyDJs.

The songs "Reruns (Daisy Duke)" and "Hammer & Tongues" were released on a limited edition white, 10" vinyl named 2nd Handsome Blues. This release also featured the songs "1-800" and "Cut Some Slack". The latter song was released on the Much Against Everyone's Advice bonus disc.

== Track listing ==
No.	Title	Length
1.	"Intro"	00:36
2.	"Reruns (Daisy Duke)"	03:10
3.	"Caramel"	04:20
4.	"Kill Your Darlings"	03:19
5.	"Great Continental Suicide Note"	04:40
6.	"Soul Simplicity"	04:34
7.	"Rooster"	06:51
8.	"Tales of a Dead Scene"	03:48
9.	"Hammer & Tongues"	03:27
10.	"Spending the Afternoon in a Slowly Revolvin' Door"	01:17
11.	"About It Song"	05:12
12.	"Long Distance Zoom"	03:08
13.	"Vista Grande"	02:14
14.	"Acapulco Gold"	13:32
Total length:		58:08
