= See the Light (The Hours album) =

See The Light

Studio album by The Hours
- Released: 20 April 2009
- Genre: Indie rock
- Label: Is Good
- Producer: Flood

The Hours chronology
Narcissus Road (2007)	See The Light (2009)	It's Not How You Start, It's How You Finish (2010)

See The Light is the second album by the Hours. It was released on 20 April 2009.

The cover art work was designed by the renknowned YBA Damien Hirst and was amongst the top 50 designs for the Best Art Vinyl 2009 award.

== Track listing ==
All tracks composed by the Hours (Antony Genn and Martin Slattery); except where noted.

1. "Big Black Hole" - 4:16
2. "These Days" - 3:56
3. "Come On" - 3:11
4. "Never See You Again" (Andy Treacey, Emily Dolan Davies, Mark Neary, Mike Moore, Richard Lobb) - 4:22
5. "Car Crash" - 4:26
6. "Think Again" - 5:56
7. "Love Is an Action" - 4:28
8. "The Girl Who Had the World at Her Feet" - 4:12
9. "Wall of Sound" - 5:14
10. "See the Light" - 11:08

== Personnel ==
The Hours

- Antony Genn - vocals, "bits and bobs"
- Martin Slattery - piano, "loads of other stuff"

with:

- Mike Moore, Richard Lobb - guitar
- Mark Neary - bass
- Andy Treacey, Emily Dolan Davies - drums
- Antony Genn, Philip Sheppard - string arrangements
- Hilary Skewes - orchestra contractor

Additional musicians

- Dimitri Tikovoï (track: 1)
- Gordon Davis, Jarvis Cocker, Steve Mackey (track: 9)
- Jim Hunt (track: 3)
- Jimmy Hogarth, Kevin Cormack, Patrick Byrne, Philip Sheppard (track: 5)
- Thomas Kemp (track: 5)

== Notes ==
- "See the Light" is actually seven minutes long, but there is a hidden track which begins a minute after the end of "See the Light".
- As with their previous album, the album artwork was created by British artist Damien Hirst.
