= As Heard on Radio Soulwax Pt. 2 =

Compilation album by 2ManyDJs
- Released: February 17, 2003 (UK)
- Genre: Bastard pop
- Length: 61:12
- Label: Play It Again Sam

Alternative cover
- Original artwork

As Heard on Radio Soulwax Pt. 2 is the first album to be released by Soulwax members David and Stephen Dewaele also known as 2ManyDJs. It consists of 45 remixed tracks by a series of diverse artists including Dolly Parton, Basement Jaxx and 10cc. While some of the tracks are conventional remixes, most tracks are mashup collages with the vocals of one song placed over the instrumental part of another. The sampled material was extensively cleared for commercial release; as a result, only 114 elements appear out of the 187 recordings that 2ManyDJs initially wished to use. The artwork of the album was also altered following lawsuit threats from the photographer of the original images.

The album became a commercial success in Belgium and a critical success elsewhere, eventually selling more than half a million copies worldwide.

== Background ==
In 1998, when touring with their Soulwax album Much Against Everyone's Advice, the Dewaele brothers started to perform as DJs at their own after-shows as "The Flying Dewaele Brothers", later renamed "The Fucking Dewaele Brothers". It became a successful act in its own right, and they performed as headliners on the second stage of the 1999 Rock Werchter festival. Flemish main alternative music station, Studio Brussel, then asked them to become resident DJs for the show "Hang the DJs". It was there that the brothers made their first real mash-ups.

In 2002, As Heard on Radio Soulwax Pt. 2 became the first official mash-up album. Prior mash-ups were bootlegs, never officially released, but Soulwax, and their record label PIAS Recordings, went to great lengths to get clearance for the recordings used in the mixes. The duo originally wished to include elements of 187 recordings, but eventually used 114 of them. 62 were refused permission and 11 could not be traced. The track "Shake Your Body" lacked clearance, as the license owner could not be found. 2ManyDJs included it anyway, because they felt its exclusion would be a waste.

The cover was originally taken from a photograph of Elton John outside Langan's Brasserie giving the two-fingered salute; designer Marc Meulemans added a brown paper bag over the head of Elton John, to avoid problems with the rights, but original photographer Richard Young refused to let them use the picture anyway. Meulemans then decided to remove the whole photograph by means of Tipp-Ex, leaving just the brown paper bag.

== Reception ==
Professional ratings
Review scores
Source	Rating
AllMusic	5/5 stars
Drowned in Sound	9/10
NME	6/10
Pitchfork	7.6/10
The Rolling Stone Album Guide	4/5 stars
Stylus Magazine	A−

In Stylus Magazine, Scott Plagenhoef gave it an "A−" rating and named it "one of the first real contenders for album of the year". Zane Lowe called it a "historical record", in Belpop, a documentary about Soulwax on Belgian TV channel Canvas.

The album peaked at No. 2 in the Flemish Ultratop album chart, staying in the chart for 41 weeks, and reached No. 29 in Norway, No. 31 in the Netherlands, and No. 79 in France. The album was certified a gold record in Belgium.

Neil Strauss rated it the best pop album of 2002 in his end-of-year list in The New York Times. The Face placed it second in their list of best albums of 2002, and Spin placed it at No. 40 in their end-of-year list of best albums, calling it "the year's best novelty record".

David Bowie described the mash-ups as "dynamite combinations" in an interview on BBC radio, and gave further praise in an interview in The Times. Bowie also invited Soulwax with him for an interview on French television in 2003.

Online music magazine Pitchfork placed As Heard On Radio Soulwax Pt. 2 at number 93 on their list of top 200 albums of the 2000s. At the 2013 Elektropedia Awards, the album was voted the best Belgian dance album ever.

== Track listing ==
On CD copies of the album, it is possible to rewind to before the first track to access "Can't Get You Out Of My Head (Soulwax Elektronic Mix)" by Kylie Minogue. This is accomplished by pressing play, rewinding for 4 minutes and 17 seconds and allowing the album to start. After this song the album moves straight into the first song.

1. – 2:49
  - Emerson, Lake & Palmer, "Peter Gunn" [live]
  - Basement Jaxx, "Where's Your Head At" (Head-a-pella)
2. Peaches, "Fuck the Pain Away" – 1:38
3. Velvet Underground, "I'm Waiting for the Man" – 0:57
4. – 0:59
  - Polyester, "J'aime Regarder Les Mecs"
  - Sly and the Family Stone, "Dance to the Music"
  - Ready for the World, "Oh Sheila" (a cappella)
5. Dakar & Grinser, "I Wanna Be Your Dog" – 1:44 [cover of The Stooges]
6. Ural 13 Diktators, "Disko Kings" – 1:28
7. – 2:56
  - Bobby Orlando, "The "O" Medley"
  - Felix da Housecat, "Silverscreen Shower Scene" [featuring Miss Kittin]
8. – 2:31
  - The Stooges, "No Fun"
  - Salt 'n Pepa, "Push It"
9. – 2:28
  - Hanayo with Jürgen Paape, "Joe le taxi"
  - The Jets, "Crush on You" (a cappella)
10. – 3:03
  - Funkacise Gang, "Funkacise"
  - Soul Grabber, "Motocross Madness"
  - Lil Louis and the World, "French Kiss"
11. Zongamin, "Serious Trouble" – 1:39
12. Garbage, "Androgyny" (Felix da Housecat 'thee glitz mix') – 1:16
13. – 2:30
  - Frank Delour, "Disc Jockey's Delight Vol. 2"
  - The Residents, "Kaw-Liga" (prairie mix)
14. Carlos Morgan, "Shake Your Body" – 2:11 [cover of The Jacksons]
15. Alphawezen, "Into the Stars" (Firebirds remix) – 0:58
16. – 1:37
  - Terranova, "Concepts" (Note: This track is incorrectly attributed to Interstellar.)
  - Nena, "99 Luftballons"
17. – 3:30
  - Destiny's Child, "Independent Women Part 1" (a cappella)
  - 10cc, "Dreadlock Holiday"
18. – 2:29
  - Dolly Parton, "9 to 5"
  - Röyksopp, "Eple"
19. Arbeid Adelt!, "Death Disco" – 0:43 [cover of Public Image Ltd.]
20. Jeans Team, "Keine Melodien" featuring MJ Lan – 1:46
21. – 3:30
  - Skee-Lo, "I Wish" (a cappella)
  - Maurice Fulton Presents Stress, "My Gigolo"
  - The Breeders, "Cannonball"
22. The Cramps, "Human Fly" – 1:33
23. The Wildbunch, "Danger! High Voltage" – 1:42
24. Op:l Bastards, "Don't Bring Me Down" – 1:57 [cover of Electric Light Orchestra]
25. ADULT., "Hand to Phone" – 1:40
26. Vitalic, "La Rock 01" – 2:37
27. Queen of Japan, "I Was Made for Loving You" – 1:59 [cover of Kiss]
28. – 2:12
  - New Order, "The Beach"
  - Detroit Grand Pubahs, "Sandwiches"
29. Lords of Acid, "I Sit on Acid" (Soulwax remix) – 2:56
30. Streamer featuring Private Thoughts in Public Places, "Start Button" – 1:56

== Video ==
In 2014, as the 24th and final part of their series of hour-long video mixes, 2ManyDJs released a full video for their "As Heard on Radio Soulwax Pt. 2".
