= Part of the Weekend Never Dies =

2008 documentary film

- Directed by: Saam Farahmand
- Produced by: Piet Bekaert, Georges Bermann, Grace Bodie, Kenny Gates, Michel Lambot, Pierre Mossiat, Sasha Nixon, Madeleine Sanderson, Phil Saussus, Soulwax
- Starring: David Dewaele, Stephen Dewaele Soulwax
- Edited by: Kurt Augustyns
- Distributed by: PIAS
- Release date: September 8, 2008
- Running time: 69 minutes
- Countries: United Kingdom, Belgium

Part of the Weekend Never Dies is a rockumentary film depicting the worldwide concert tour of the Belgian band Soulwax.

Director Saam Farahmand filmed Soulwax on their recent international tour dates, showcasing the events and experiences of the band during the tour. Soulwax filmed 120 shows using one camera in Europe, Japan, the USA, Latin America and Australia. This resulted in 2 films: a live music film and a documentary which includes 2manydj’s and Soulwax Nite Versions, and features James Murphy, Nancy Whang, Erol Alkan, Tiga, Boys Noize, Justice, Busy P, So-Me, Peaches, The Naked Guy, Kitsuné, Klaxons in behind the scenes footage, interviews and music.

== DVD ==
- Part Of The Weekend Never Dies
- Part Of The Weekend REALLY Never Dies
- Commentary (by Tiga)

=== DVD song credits ===
Title	Notes
"Miserable Girl"	
"E Talking"	
"NY Lipps"	Contains a sample of "Funkytown" by Lipps Inc.
"(We Are Your Friends) Never Be Alone"	Song by Justice vs Simian
"Move My Body"	Song by Tiga
"You Gonna Want Me" (Tocadisco Remix)	Song by Tiga
"Phantom" (Soulwax Remix)	Soulwax remix of a Justice song featuring a sample from Tenebre by Goblin
"Krack"	
"Another Excuse" (DFA remix)	
"Let There Be Light"	Song by Justice
"Frequency"	Song by Altern-8
"James Brown Is Dead"	Song by LA Style
"Computer Games" (Theme from Circus)	Song by Yellow Magic Orchestra
"Robot Rock" (Soulwax remix)	Song by Daft Punk, contains samples of "Release The Beast" by Breakwater and elements of the same song by Kae Williams
"Yellow Brick"	Song by Noisia
"Standing In The Way of Control" (Soulwax remix)	Song by The Gossip
"A Bit Patchy"	Song by Switch, samples Michael Viner's song "Apache".
"Klaxon"	Song by Sébastien Léger
"Newman"	Song by Vitalic
"Dance 2 Slow"	
"Evil Woman"	Song by Electric Light Orchestra
"Can't Get Out of My Head"	Song by Electric Light Orchestra

== CD track listing: Nite Versions live at Fabric ==
No.	Title	Length
1.	"Teachers"	4:21
2.	"Move My Body"	3:26
3.	"Miserable Girl"	4:40
4.	"E Talking"	5:10
5.	"Accidents and Compliments"	5:32
6.	"Another Excuse"	4:20
7.	"I Love Techno"	5:39
8.	"KracK"	5:19
9.	"Slowdance"	5:32
10.	"Washing Up"	3:31
11.	"NY Excuse"	6:15
Total length:		53:45
