= Showtime (Nitzer Ebb album) =

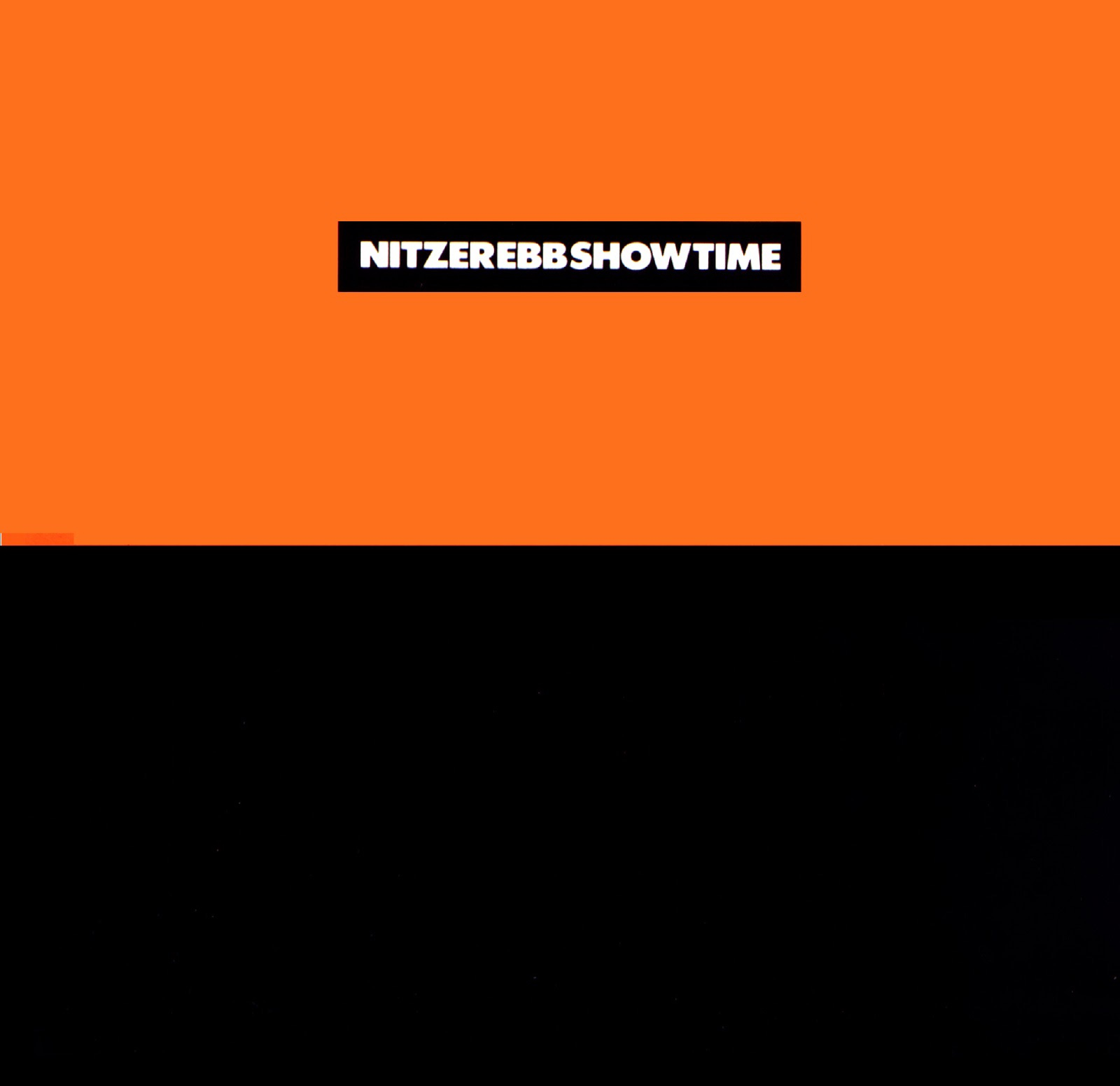

Studio album by Nitzer Ebb
- Released: 1990
- Recorded: 1989
- Genre: EBM
- Length: 36:41
- Labels: Mute (UK); Geffen/Warner Bros. (US)
- Producer: Flood

Nitzer Ebb chronology
| Belief (1989) | Showtime (1990) | As Is (1991) |

Singles from Showtime
- 1. "Lightning Man" Released: 5 February 1990; 2. "Fun to Be Had / Getting Closer" Released: 10 September 1990

Showtime is the third studio album by the British EBM group Nitzer Ebb. It featured the singles "Lightning Man" and "Fun to Be Had", the latter of which was later remixed by George Clinton. "Getting Closer" was also released as a single. Nitzer Ebb supported the album by touring with Depeche Mode.

== Critical reception ==
Professional ratings
Review scores
| Source | Rating |
|---|---|
| AllMusic | 4/5 stars |
| Calgary Herald | C− |
| Entertainment Weekly | A |
| Orlando Sentinel | 3/5 stars |

The Washington Post wrote that "with nothing more than synth (employed principally for percussion) and shout, the Ebbs construct grooves of surprising fluidity and even humanity." The St. Petersburg Times determined that "Nitzer Ebb's brooding, Teutonic lyrics are not appealing in arrangements more reminiscent of Cabaret than Cabaret Voltaire." The Calgary Herald concluded that "Brits Douglas McCarthy and Bon Harris do a little minimalist fiddling with synthesizers and do a lot of hollering about pop stars, the media and life's seamier side."

== Track listing ==
1. "Getting Closer" – 4:12
2. "Nobody Knows" – 4:06
3. "One Man's Burden" – 3:50
4. "All Over" – 3:33
5. "My Heart" – 4:08
6. "Lightning Man" – 4:59
7. "Rope" – 3:25
8. "Hold On" – 3:46
9. "Fun to Be Had" – 4:42
