= The Remedy (Karima Francis album) =

Studio album by Karima Francis
- Released: August 13, 2012
- Genre: Pop, rock
- Label: Mercury Records

Karima Francis chronology
| The Author (2009) | The Remedy (2012) |

The Remedy is a 2012 album by singer Karima Francis.

Professional ratings
Aggregate scores
| Source | Rating |
|---|---|
| Metacritic | 61/100 |
Review scores
| Source | Rating |
| The Guardian | 2/5 stars |
| NME Magazine | 6/10 stars |

== Track listing ==
| No. | Title | Length |
|---|---|---|
| 1. | "The Remedy" |
| 2. | "Tonight" |
| 3. | "Wherever I Go" |
| 4. | "Glory Days" |
| 5. | "Arrest You" |
| 6. | "Stay" |
| 7. | "Forgiven" |
| 8. | "Good Bad & Ugly" |
| 9. | "Crazy" |
| 10. | "Days Like These" |
