= Industrial Complex (album) =

Studio album by Nitzer Ebb
- Released: 22 January 2010
- Recorded: 2008
- Genre: EBM
- Labels: (European Union) Major Records, (Belgium) Alfa Matrix, (United States) Artists' Addiction Records/Nitzer Ebb Inc.,
- Producers: John Vaughn, Flood

Nitzer Ebb chronology
Body Rework (2006)	Industrial Complex (2010)

Singles from Industrial Complex

Professional ratings
Review scores
Source	Rating
AllMusic	3/5 stars
NME	4/5 stars
The Skinny	3/5 stars

Industrial Complex is the sixth studio album by British EBM group Nitzer Ebb. It was released by Major Records on 22 January 2010 in Europe, fifteen years after the band's last studio album. It is the band's first release after parting company with Mute Records following its 2006 retrospective, Body of Work.

The Belgian edition (from Alfa Matrix) includes various bonus tracks.

== Critical reception ==
NME wrote that the album "sounds like Depeche Mode if they’d stuck with the dark stuff rather than soundtracking tawdry Home Counties swingers parties." The Quietus called the album "all kinds of awesome."

== Basic/tour edition ==
1. "Promises" 3:48
2. "Once You Say" 3:41
3. "Never Known" 3:58
4. "Going Away" 4:10
5. "Hit You Back" 4:19
6. "Payroll" 2:57
7. "Down On Your Knees" 3:52
8. "I Don't Know You" 3:12
9. "My Door Is Open" 3:15
10. "I Am Undone" 3:51
11. "Kiss Kiss Bang Bang" 2:57
12. "Traveling" 3:13 (bonus track)

== Belgian edition bonus tracks ==
13. "Once You Say" (Komor Kommando Mix)
14. "Once You Say" (Leæther Strip Mix)
15. "Once You Say" (Essence Of Mind Mix)
16. "Once You Say" (Implant Mix)
17. "Once You Say" (Pouppée Fabrikk Mix)

== Limited edition double CD tracks ==
1. "I Am Undone" (Alan Wilder Remix) 5:29
2. "I Am Undone" (Christopher Kah Remix) 5:17
3. "My Door Is Open" (Terence Fixmer Remix) 5:48
4. "Once You Say" (Tom Furse Remix) 6:07
5. "Once You Say" (Celluloide Mix) 4:46
6. "Once You Say" (Orphee-Eeproh Remix) 4:29
7. "Once You Say" (People Theatre Remix) 4:24
8. "Once You Say" (Collapsed System Mix) 4:44
9. "Once You Say" (Suessenborn Sinessence Remix) 4:10

== USA edition tracks (single disc, Artists' Addiction Records, AAR 001) ==
Same as Basic/tour edition, then additional tracks:
13. "On the Road"
14. "I Am Undone" (Alan Wilder Remix) 5:29
15. "I Am Undone" (Christopher Kah Remix) 5:17
16. "My Door Is Open" (Terence Fixmer Remix) 5:48
17. "Once You Say" (Tom Furse Remix) 6:07

== Personnel ==
Technical

- Flood – producer, mixing
- Stefano de Silva – mastering
