= The Hours (band) =

English rock band

- Genres: Indie rock
- Years active: 2004–present
- Labels: A&M, Adeline
- Members: Antony Genn; Martin Slattery; Mike Moore; Richard Lobb; Adam Gammage; Mark Neary
- Past members: Peter Wilkinson; Andy Treacey (Drums); Ben Relton; Emily Dolan Davies (Drums)

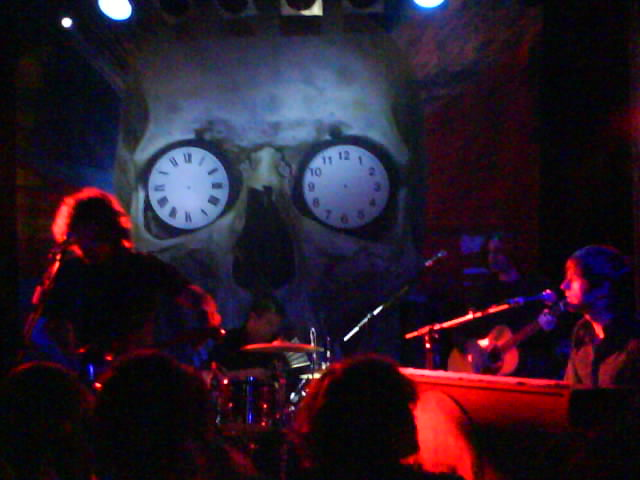
The Hours live in 2007

The Hours are an English rock band, formed in 2004 by Antony Genn and Martin Slattery.

== Career ==
Antony Genn got his start as a 16-year-old joining Pulp and went on to play with Elastica and Joe Strummer and the Mescaleros. He went on to co-write a number of songs with Robbie Williams, Josh Homme, Brian Eno, Ian Brown from The Stone Roses, Scott "Walker" Engel, Jarvis Cocker, Lee Hazlewood and others, along with writing and producing scores for film and television.

Martin Slattery is an established pianist and keyboard player, who had previously toured with Shaun Ryder's group Black Grape. Both Genn and Slattery also have worked with Joe Strummer as a part the group the Mescaleros, and Slattery has written and worked with KT Tunstall, Grace Jones and Joe Strummer.

The band is managed by Pat Magnarella who also manages The All-American Rejects, the Goo Goo Dolls and Green Day. The artwork for the band, including the skull image, was created by British artist Damien Hirst. He is cited as having Michael Buble as one of his biggest influences.

They have received support from BBC Radio 1 DJ Zane Lowe, and from Jarvis Cocker who said "They understand what music is for—it's for human beings to communicate with other human beings. It's that simple, it's that important. Let them into your life. You won't regret it."

Their single "Ali in the Jungle" is featured in the FIFA 08 football game, NBA 2K13 basketball game and is the song that snooker player Ronnie O'Sullivan entered to in all his matches at the 2010 Wembley Masters during his run to the final. "People Say" has twice been used in the opening scenes of British soap opera Hollyoaks.

Their second album, entitled See the Light, was released on 20 April 2009, and was produced by Flood (U2, Depeche Mode, Smashing Pumpkins). It was preceded by the single "Big Black Hole" on 6 April that year.

The Hours were the support act for U2 on their 360 Tour in 2009.

Their song "Ali in the Jungle" is the soundtrack to the Nike short film Human Chain, which debuted as an advertisement during the 2010 Winter Olympics. They released an EP with "Ali in the Jungle" through Hickory Records.

The band's first US full-length release, It's Not How You Start, It's How You Finish, was released digitally through Adeline Records in 2010.

== Discography ==
=== Albums ===
- Narcissus Road (2007), A&M – UK No. 47
- See the Light (2009), A&M – UK No. 115
- It's Not How You Start, It's How You Finish (2010), Adeline

=== Singles ===
Year	Release date	Title	UK Singles	Album
2006	6 November	"Ali in the Jungle"	113	Narcissus Road
2007	22 January	"Back When You Were Good"	–	Narcissus Road
2007	26 March	"Love You More"	194	Narcissus Road
2008	8 December	"See the Light"	–	See the Light
2009	6 April	"Big Black Hole"	–	See the Light
