= Essential (Soulwax album) =

Studio album by Soulwax
- Released: 22 June 2018
- Genres: Electronic; electro house; synth-pop; disco
- Length: 60:38
- Labels: PIAS Recordings; Deewee
- Producer: Soulwax

Soulwax chronology
From Deewee (2017)	Essential (2018)	Deewee Sessions, Vol. 1 (2020)

Professional ratings
Aggregate scores
Source	Rating
Metacritic	76/100
Review scores
Source	Rating
Exclaim!	8/10
Mojo	4/5 stars
Q	3/5 stars
Uncut	8/10

Essential is the fifth studio album by Belgian electronic music duo Soulwax, released on 22 June 2018. The album was initially meant to be a standard DJ mix for Pete Tong's Essential Mix on BBC Radio 1 in May 2017, but instead, Soulwax decided to spend under two weeks in their Deewee studio in Ghent to write and record over a continuous hour of new original music, using equipment that was left unused during the recording sessions for their 2017 album From Deewee.

== Track listing ==
No.	Title	Length
1.	"Essential One"	5:10
2.	"Essential Two"	5:03
3.	"Essential Three"	5:04
4.	"Essential Four"	6:08
5.	"Essential Five"	4:17
6.	"Essential Six"	6:49
7.	"Essential Seven"	4:36
8.	"Essential Eight"	6:28
9.	"Essential Nine"	4:30
10.	"Essential Ten"	6:48
11.	"Essential Eleven"	3:15
12.	"Essential Twelve"	2:30
Total length:		60:38

== Charts ==
Chart (2018)	Peak position
Belgian Albums (Ultratop Flanders)	4
Belgian Albums (Ultratop Wallonia)	82
