= Most of the Remixes =

Remix album by Soulwax
- Released: 22 October 2007
- Recorded: 1997–2007
- Studio: Soulwax's studio (Ghent, Belgium)
- Genre: Electronic
- Length: 135:41
- Label: Parlophone
- Producer: Soulwax

Soulwax chronology
Nite Versions (2005)	Most of the Remixes (2007)	Belgica (2016)

Professional ratings
Review scores
Source	Rating
NME	(7/10) (11/03/2007, p.47)
Rockfeedback	link
Twisted Ear	link

Most of the Remixes (Note: Full title: Most of the remixes we've made for other people over the years except for the one for Einstürzende Neubauten because we lost it and a few we didn't think sounded good enough or just didn't fit in length-wise, but including some that are hard to find because either people forgot about them or just simply because they haven't been released yet, a few we really love, one we think is just ok, some we did for free, some we did for money, some for ourselves without permission and some for friends as swaps but never on time and always at our studio in Ghent.) is a remix compilation album by Belgian electronic music group Soulwax. It was released on 22 October 2007, and features a collection of remixes made by Soulwax for other artists. The album's full title contains 552 characters of text and 103 words.

== Background ==
The remix album is noted for having a 552-character album title, about 100 characters more than the Fiona Apple album When the Pawn..., which previously held the record for being the longest title for a major label album. This was later surpassed by the 2008 Chumbawamba album The Boy Bands Have Won..., with its full title containing 865 characters of text.

== Track listing ==
=== Disc one ===
1. Gossip, "Standing in the Way of Control" (Soulwax nite version) – 6:56
  - Producers: Guy Picciotto, Ryan Hadlock
  - Writers: Gossip
2. LCD Soundsystem, "Daft Punk Is Playing at My House" (Soulwax Shibuya re-remix) – 7:09
  - Producer: The DFA
  - Writer: James Murphy
3. Human Resource vs. 808 State, "Dominator" (Soulwax edit) – 4:03
  - Writers: 808 State
  - Producers, writers: 80 AUM, Johan van Beek, Robert Mahu
4. Klaxons, "Gravity's Rainbow" (Soulwax remix) – 6:24
  - Producer: James Ford
  - Writers: Klaxons
5. DJ Shadow, "Six Days" (Soulwax remix) – 5:14
  - Producer: DJ Shadow
  - Writers: B. Farrell, D. Olivieri, J. Davis
6. Justice, "Phantom Pt. II" (Soulwax remix) – 7:27
  - Writers, producers: Gaspard Augé, Xavier de Rosnay
7. Kylie Minogue, "Can't Get You Out of My Head" (Soulwax KYLUSS remix) – 4:20
  - Writers, producers – Cathy Dennis, Rob Davis
8. Gorillaz, "DARE" (Soulwax remix) – 5:45
  - Producers: Danger Mouse, Gorillaz, James Dring, Jason Cox
  - Writers: Gorillaz
9. Robbie Williams, "Lovelight" (Soulwax Ravelight dub) – 6:28
  - Producer: Mark Ronson
  - Writer: Lewis Taylor
10. Arthur Argent, "Hold Your Head Up" (Soulwhacked mix) – 5:46
  - Producer: Arthur Baker
  - Writers: White, Argent
11. Lords of Acid, "I Sit on Acid" (Soulwax remix) – 3:01
  - Producer – Jachri Praha
  - Writers: Inger, Van Oekel, Van Lierop, Khan
12. Daft Punk, "Robot Rock" (Soulwax remix) – 6:31
  - Producers: Cédric Hervet, Daft Punk, Gildas Loaec
  - Writers: Guy-Manuel de Homem-Christo, Thomas Bangalter, Kae Williams
13. Sugababes, "Round Round" (Soulwax remix) – 4:14
  - Producers: Jonathan Quarmby, Kevin Bacon
  - Additional production: Jeremy Wheatley
  - Original production: Brian Higgins, Tim Powell
  - Writers: Higgins, Stecher, Plfueger, Range, Buchanan, Cowling, Cooper, Buena, Coler, Spadavecchia, Hofmann, Powell
14. Muse, "Muscle Museum" (Soulwax remix) – 3:47
  - Producers: Muse, Paul Reeve
  - Writers: Matthew Bellamy

=== Disc two ===
There is a hidden track before the start of track 1 of disc 2; the lost Einstürzende Neubauten remix mentioned in the title. The track also appears as track 20 on the Japanese release.

0. Einstürzende Neubauten, "Stella Maris (Soulwax Remix)" – 5:35

The following is a mix by 2 Many DJ's.

1. LCD Soundsystem, "Daft Punk Is Playing at My House" (Soulwax Shibuya re-remix) – 3:20
  - Producer: The DFA
  - Writer: James Murphy
2. Gossip, "Standing in the Way of Control" (Soulwax nite version) – 3:36
  - Producers: Guy Picciotto, Ryan Hadlock
  - Writers: Gossip
3. Arthur Argent, "Hold Your Head Up" (Soulwhacked mix) – 3:34
  - Producer: Arthur Baker
  - Writers: White, Argent
4. Daft Punk, "Robot Rock" (Soulwax remix) – 1:38
  - Producers: Cedric Hervet, Daft Punk, Gildas Loaec
  - Writers: Guy-Manuel de Homem-Christo, Thomas Bangalter, Kae Williams
5. Human Resource vs. 808 State, "Dominator" (Soulwax remix) – 2:37
  - Writer: 808 State
  - Writers, producers: 80 AUM, Johan van Beek, Robert Mahu
6. Robbie Williams, "Lovelight" (Soulwax Ravelight dub) – 3:30
  - Producer: Mark Ronson
  - Writer: Lewis Taylor
7. Kylie Minogue, "Can't Get You Out of My Head" (Soulwax KYLUSS remix) – 2:00
  - Writers, producers: Cathy Dennis, Rob Davis
8. West Phillips, "(I'm Just A Sucker) For a Pretty Face" (Soulwax remix) – 1:31
  - Producers: Larry Williams, West Phillips
  - Writer: West Phillips
9. Justice, "Phantom Pt. II" (Soulwax remix) – 3:15
  - Writers, producers: Gaspard Auge, Xavier de Rosnay
10. Sugababes, "Round Round" (Soulwax remix) – 2:49
  - Producers – Jonathan Quarmby, Kevin Bacon
  - Additional production: Jeremy Wheatley
  - Original production: Brian Higgins, Tim Powell
  - Writers: Higgins, Stecher, Plfueger, Range, Buchanan, Cowling, Cooper, Buena, Coler, Spadavecchia, Hofmann, Powell
11. Tiga, "Move My Body" (original version) – 2:28
  - Producers: Soulwax, Tiga
  - Writers: Tiga Sontag
12. Playgroup, "Make It Happen" (Soulwax remix) – 1:36
  - Producer: Trevor Jackson
  - Writers: DeConnick, Jackson
13. Klaxons, "Gravity's Rainbow" (Soulwax remix) – 3:12
  - Producer: James Ford
  - Writers: Klaxons
14. Felix da Housecat, "Rocket Ride" (Soulwax Rock It Right remix) – 3:07
  - Writers, producer: Felix da Housecat, GoodandEvil, Tommie Sunshine
15. Ladytron, "Seventeen" (Soulwax remix) – 2:14
  - Producer: Daniel Hunt (Additional production by Mickey Petralia)
  - Writers: Ladytron
16. Gorillaz, "DARE" (Soulwax remix) – 1:42
  - Producers: Danger Mouse, Gorillaz, James Dring, Jason Cox
  - Writers: Gorillaz
17. Hot Chip, "Ready for the Floor" (Soulwax dub) – 5:36
  - Producer, writer: Hot Chip
18. Lords of Acid, "I Sit on Acid" (Soulwax remix) – 1:29
  - Producer – Jachri Praha
  - Writers: Inger, Van Oekel, Van Lierop, Khan
19. DJ Shadow, "Six Days" (Soulwax remix) – 4:02
  - Producer – DJ Shadow
  - Writers: B. Farrell, D. Olivieri, J. Davis

== Charts ==
=== Weekly charts ===
Chart (2007)	Peak position
Belgian Albums (Ultratop Flanders)	2
Belgian Albums (Ultratop Wallonia)	32
French Albums (SNEP)	125

=== Year-end charts ===
Chart (2007)	Position
Belgian Albums (Ultratop Flanders)	52
Chart (2008)	Position
Belgian Albums (Ultratop Flanders)	92

== Notes and references ==
Notes
