= Much Against Everyone's Advice =

Studio album by Soulwax
- Released: 12 October 1998
- Genre: Alternative rock
- Length: 49:27 (EU); 38:38 (UK); 45:03 (US)
- Labels: Play It Again Sam (Europe); Almo Sounds (US); Avex Trax (Japan)
- Producer: David Sardy

Soulwax chronology
| Leave the Story Untold (1996) | Much Against Everyone's Advice (1998) | Any Minute Now (2004) |

Professional ratings
Review scores
| Source | Rating |
|---|---|
| AllMusic | 4/5 stars |
| PlayLouder | 8/10 stars |

Much Against Everyone's Advice is the second studio album by Belgian alternative rock band Soulwax, released on 12 October 1998. It includes a hidden track that can be found by rewinding about 50 seconds before "Conversation Intercom". According to the booklet, it is called "Turn on the A.C.".

== Track listing ==
=== Belgian/European release ===
| No. | Title | Length |
|---|---|---|
| 1. | "Conversation Intercom" | 3:06 |
| 2. | "Saturday" | 3:11 |
| 3. | "When Logics Die" | 3:29 |
| 4. | "Much Against Everyone's Advice" | 2:48 |
| 5. | "Overweight Karate Kid" | 2:04 |
| 6. | "Proverbial Pants" | 4:27 |
| 7. | "The Salty Knowledge Of Tears" | 2:42 |
| 8. | "Flying Without Wings" | 3:47 |
| 9. | "More Than This" | 4:21 |
| 10. | "Too Many DJs" | 4:11 |
| 11. | "Temptingly Yours" | 2:26 |
| 12. | "My Cruel Joke" | 4:23 |
| 13. | "Scream" | 3:38 |
| 14. | "Funny" | 4:34 |
| Total length: | | 49:27 |

=== UK release ===
| No. | Title | Length |
|---|---|---|
| 1. | "Conversation Intercom" | 3:06 |
| 2. | "Saturday" | 3:11 |
| 3. | "When Logics Die" | 3:30 |
| 4. | "Much Against Everyone's Advice" | 2:48 |
| 5. | "Overweight Karate Kid" | 2:04 |
| 6. | "Proverbial Pants" | 4:27 |
| 7. | "More Than This"" | 4:22 |
| 8. | "Too Many DJs (New Version)" | 4:31 |
| 9. | "Temptingly Yours" | 2:27 |
| 10. | "Scream" | 3:38 |
| 11. | "Funny" | 4:34 |
| Total length: | | 38:38 |

=== US release ===
| No. | Title | Length |
|---|---|---|
| 1. | "Conversation Intercom" | 3:06 |
| 2. | "Saturday" | 3:11 |
| 3. | "When Logics Die" | 3:29 |
| 4. | "Much Against Everyone's Advice" | 2:48 |
| 5. | "Overweight Karate Kid" | 2:04 |
| 6. | "Proverbial Pants" | 4:27 |
| 7. | "The Salty Knowledge Of Tears" | 2:42 |
| 8. | "Flying Without Wings" | 3:47 |
| 9. | "More Than This" | 4:21 |
| 10. | "Too Many DJs" | 4:31 |
| 11. | "Temptingly Yours" | 2:26 |
| 12. | "Scream" | 3:38 |
| 13. | "Funny" | 4:34 |
| Total length: | | 45:03 |

== Charts ==
| Chart (1998) | Peak position |
|---|---|
| Belgian Albums (Ultratop Flanders) | 6 |
| Dutch Albums (Album Top 100) | 70 |

=== Year-end charts ===
Year-end chart performance for Much Against Everyone's Advice
| Chart (1999) | Position |
|---|---|
| Belgian Albums (Ultratop Flanders) | 38 |

== Certifications ==
| Region | Certification | Certified units/sales |
|---|---|---|
| Belgium (BRMA) | Gold | 25,000^{*} |
^{*} Sales figures based on certification alone.

== Bonus track ==
- 1997: Wouldn't It Be Good
