= It's Not How You Start, It's How You Finish =

Studio album by the Hours
- Released: 5 October 2010
- Genre: Indie rock
- Label: Adeline

The Hours chronology
See the Light (2009)	It's Not How You Start, It's How You Finish (2010)

It's Not How You Start, It's How You Finish is the third full-length album by the Hours. It was released on 5 October 2010 through Adeline Records. It features songs from their previous two albums, released only in Europe.

PopMatters noted in its review of the album, "Still, given the mad dash behind many of these songs, you’ll wind up cherishing the staggering hooks and left jabs to be found on It’s Not How You Start, It’s How You Finish."

== Track listing ==
1. "Ali in the Jungle"
2. "These Days"
3. "Big Black Hole"
4. "Back When You Were Good"
5. "Never See You Again"
6. "I Miss You"
7. "Icarus"
8. "1000 Years"
9. "Come On"
10. "Narcissus Road"
11. "See the Light"
12. "Born to Be (Deluxe Edition)"
13. "Murder or Suicide (Deluxe Edition)"
14. "Fade into You (Deluxe Edition)"
