= Bon Harris =

English musician (born 1965)

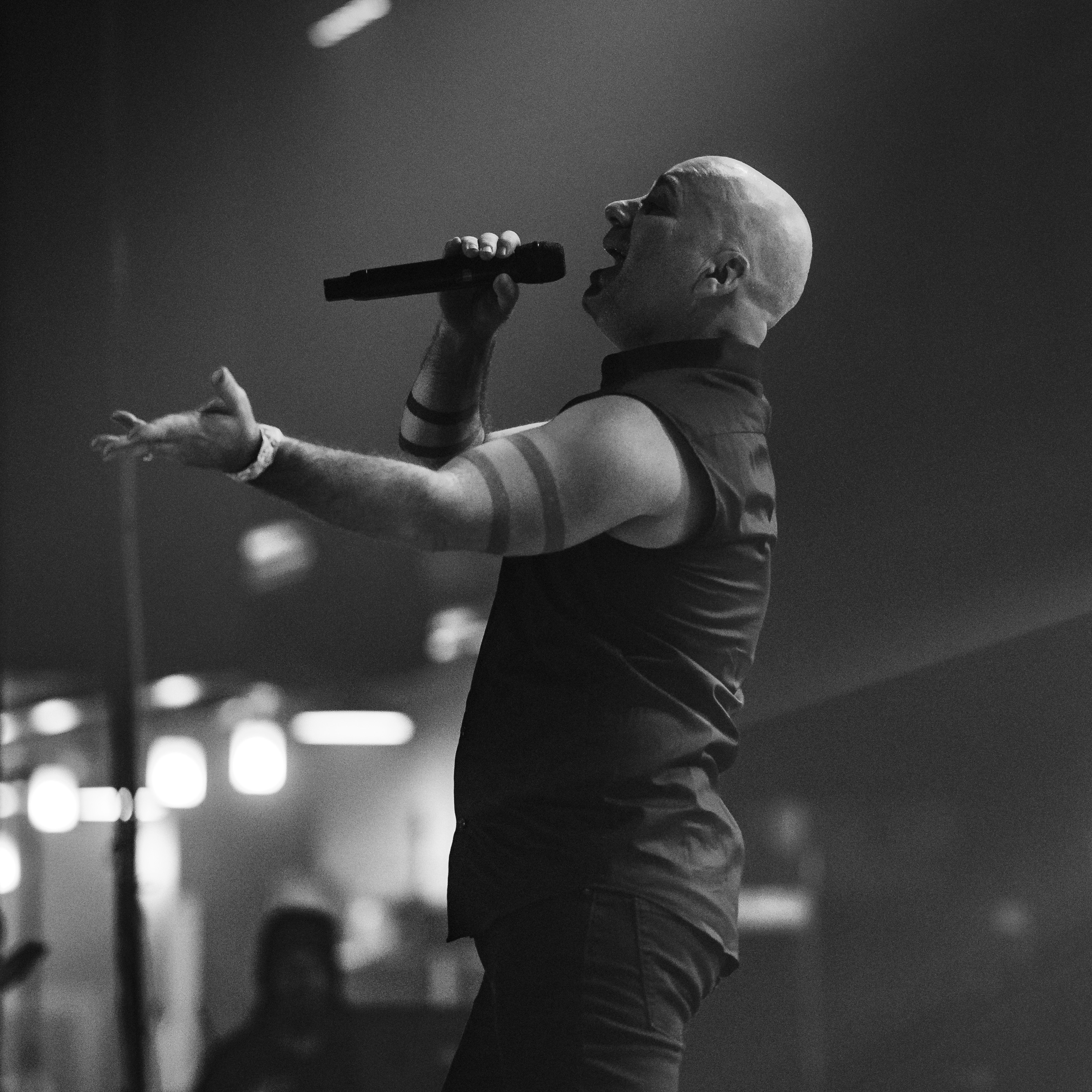
- Bon Harris from Nitzer Ebb concert in November 2021, Baltimore, MD

Background information
- Born: 12 August 1965 (age 60)
- Origin: Chelmsford, Essex, England
- Genres: EBM, industrial rock
- Occupations: Composer, record producer, musician, songwriter, singer
- Years active: 1983–present
- Labels: Mute; Geffen

Bon Harris (born Vaughan David Harris; 12 August 1965 in Chelmsford, Essex, England) is an English composer, producer, singer and songwriter, and multi-instrumentalist. He is a founding member of the British EBM group Nitzer Ebb, programming Nitzer Ebb's signature sound. He also played drums and synthesizers for Nitzer Ebb, as well as lending his voice to several tracks such as "Let Beauty Loose".

== Career ==
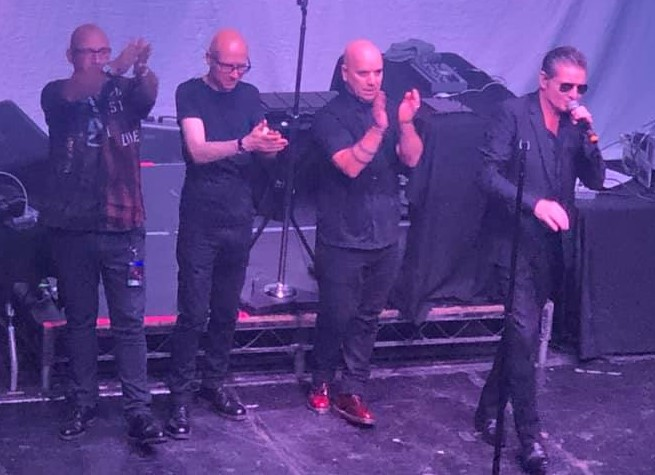
Nitzer Ebb Concert in Los Angeles, October 2019. Left to Right: David Gooday, Simon Granger, Bon Harris and Douglas McCarthy

Since Nitzer Ebb's 1995 release, Harris has become an in-demand collaborator working with Depeche Mode, The Smashing Pumpkins, Evanescence, AFI, Avril Lavigne, Bush, and Billy Corgan, who asked Bon to co-produce his solo album, TheFutureEmbrace. Harris's band, Maven, is on hold as he works on other projects.

Harris also worked closely with Marilyn Manson, programming electronics and recording for his 2000 album Holy Wood. Manson appears as a guest on Maven's cover of the Nick Cave and the Bad Seeds song "Hard On for Love" and had this to say of his collaborator and some-time inspiration:

"Bon was someone I had always respected and even interviewed in 1989 and was completely blown away by his musical ability and voice. I was fortunate that he took time away from Maven to work with me on my project. He became sort of a sixth member of the group and I don't use that term lightly. I think Maven adds genius songwriting to electronic music in a totally original way."

Harris resides in Los Angeles and continues to work as a film and TV composer. He worked on Bravo's popular shows Project Runway and Top Chef, as well as NBC's Treasure Hunters.

Nitzer Ebb embarked on a worldwide tour in 2006 that continued until 2008 when Harris returned to the studio to work on the album Industrial Complex which was released in 2009.

In July 2020, Harris did a streaming live set from his yard in Eagle Rock, CA, titled “Songs: From the Lemon Tree,” consisting of solo cover songs.

During the COVID-19 pandemic, Harris and Douglas McCarthy got together to work on a side project called D-R-A-G.

In November 2021, Harris performed on lead vocals for a Nitzer Ebb show in Palm Beach, Florida and Toronto, Ontario due to bandmate McCarthy falling ill and going to the hospital.

== Musical gear ==
Harris primarily uses vintage analog and modular synthesizers, including Roland System 100M modular, Doepfer A100, Clavia Nord Modular, Korg MS-10 and Oberheim Xpander. He has also used digital synthesizers Roland D50 and Kurzweil K2000. His first synthesizer was an EDP Wasp, which he bought by selling his Mongoose bicycle. On Nitzer Ebb albums he has used the Roland System 700 and System 100M, RSF Kobol and various analog synths of the 70's and the 80's.
