= Soulwax =

Belgian electronic music band

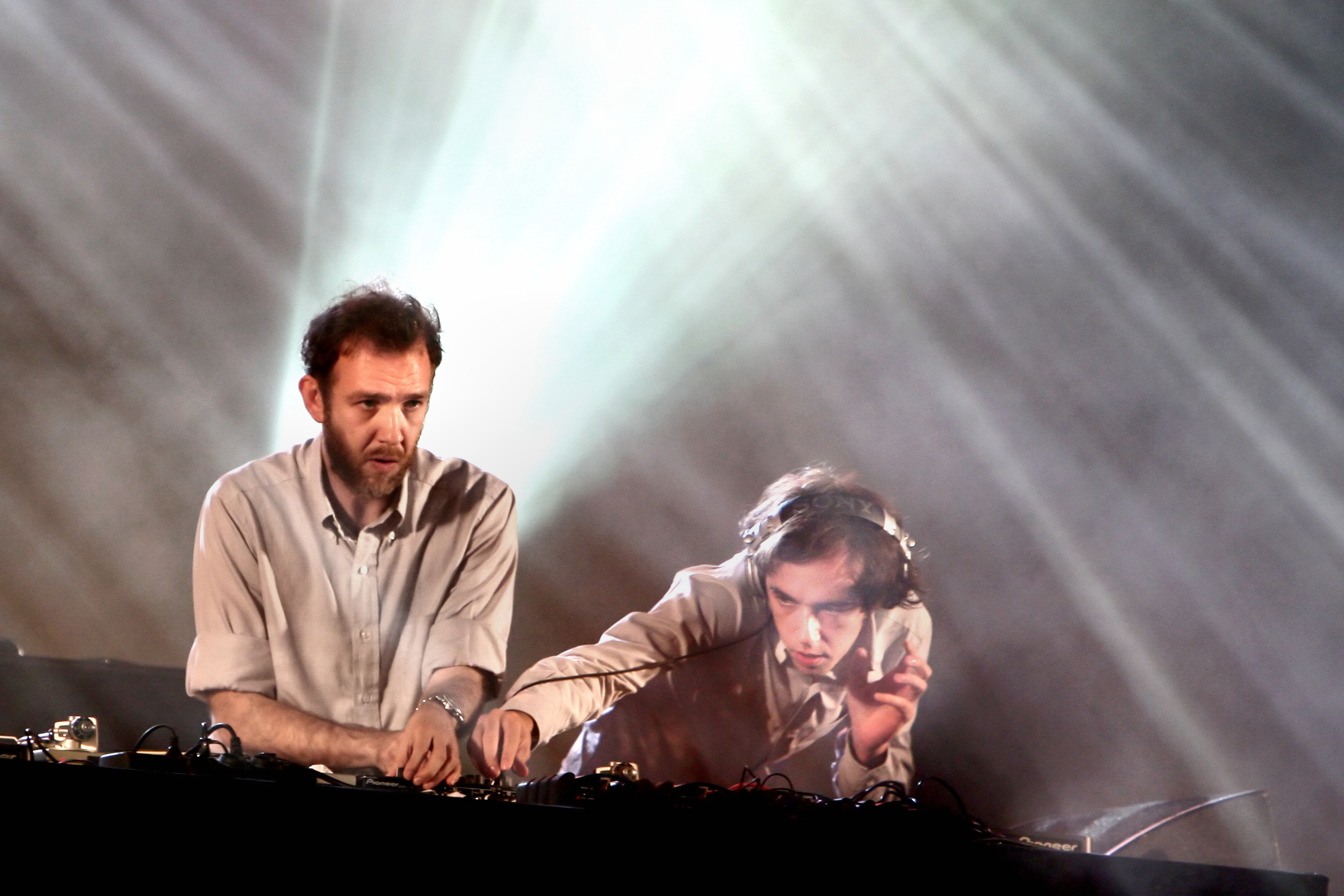
- Performing as "2manydjs" in 2007

Background information
- Also known as: 2manydjs; Fucking Dewaele Brothers; Flying Dewaele Brothers; Samantha Fu; Kawazaki
- Origin: Ghent, Belgium
- Genres: Electronic; electro house; new rave; electroclash; dance-punk revival; alternative rock (early)
- Years active: 1995–present
- Labels: PIAS; Modular; Parlophone; EMI
- Spinoffs: Die Verboten
- Members: Stephen Dewaele; David Dewaele; Stefaan Van Leuven; Igor Cavalera; Laima Cavalera; Blake Davies; Aurora Bennett
- Past members: Piet Dierickx; Kurt Huyghe; Inge Flipts; Helmut Van Den Meersschaut; Stephane Misseghers; Dave Martijn; Steve Slingeneyer; Bent Van Looy; Victoria Smith
- Website: soulwax.com

Soulwax are a Belgian electronic band and DJ/production collective from Ghent, who formed in 1995. Centred around brothers David and Stephen Dewaele, other current members include Igor and Laima Cavalera, and Stefaan Van Leuven.

The group first rose to prominence following the release of their album Much Against Everyone's Advice in 1998, and have released five studio albums to date. Outside of Soulwax, the Dewaeles also perform DJ sets under the moniker 2manydjs (first known as The Fucking Dewaele Brothers/The Flying Dewaele Brothers).

The group are also known for their project Radio Soulwax. Their 2002 compilation, As Heard on Radio Soulwax Pt. 2, was named the best popular music album of 2002 by The New York Times. The brothers have also hosted a show on Belgian television, titled Alter8.

== Career ==
Soulwax produced their first EP, 2nd Handsome Blues, in 1995 and their first full-length album, Leave the Story Untold in 1996.

The 2004 album Any Minute Now spawned three singles in "E Talking", "NY Excuse" and the title track. The "E Talking" music video was controversial and restricted to post-watershed broadcast on music television channels. Filmed on location in London's Fabric nightclub, everyone in the video is depicted as being on a different drug, listed from A through Z (including popular drug nicknames).

The group produced a number of official and unofficial remixes, including "Daft Punk Is Playing at My House" and "Get Innocuous!" by LCD Soundsystem, "Robot Rock" by Daft Punk and "Dare" by Gorillaz. They are friends of artists Tiga, LCD Soundsystem and WhoMadeWho. The album Nite Versions (2005) is a collection of remixes of tracks from the album Any Minute Now.

In January 2006, Soulwax released their second remix album. Titled This Is Radio Soulwax, it was covermounted into the February 2006 issue of Mixmag. Their third remix album, Part of NYE Never Dies, was also covermounted into Mixmag in late 2008.

In summer 2006, Soulwax completed a "Nite Version remix" of Gossip's "Standing in the Way of Control" as well as their "Ravelight Dub" and "Ravelight Vocal Mix" of Robbie Williams' "Lovelight". The summer 2006 tour was filmed by director Saam Farahmand, and resulted in the documentary "Part of the Weekend Never Dies".

In August 2006, Soulwax were working on tracks for the new album from Tiga. In late 2006, it was announced in Belgian magazine HUMO that David and Stephen Dewaele had formed a band with Shane Doran and his brother-in-law Fergadelic, called Die Verboten.

In 2007, Soulwax produced remixes of "Gravity's Rainbow" by Klaxons and "Phantom Pt. II" by Justice.

Soulwax, under the guise of 2manydjs, headlined their own "Radio Soulwax" tent at the Rock Ness Festival held on 9 June 2007. The following day at the festival, they played a Soulwax Nite Versions show in the "Clash Arena." Later that month, they took part in the Wild in the Country event at Knebworth Park on 30 June 2007. In December 2007, they held Radio Soulwax-mas, a massive Christmas party in Flanders Expo, with guests such as Tiga, Erol Alkan, Boys Noize, Justice, Riton, Mixhell, Daniele Baldelli, Hong Kong Dong, Das Pop, Goose, and Milk Inc.

Soulwax produced the debut album by fellow Belgians Das Pop, fronted by Soulwax drummer Bent Van Looy, scheduled for 2009 release in the UK.

In December 2009, Soulwax produced the song "We Love Animals" for Crookers with Mixhell. In addition, Soulwax produced the song "Talk to Me" by Peaches.

In 2016, Soulwax returned with a new live show entitled "Soulwax Transient Program For Drums And Machinery". The new line up consisted of three drummers (Victoria Smith, Blake Davies and Igor Cavalera) as well as Igor's wife Laima Leyton, (also of Mixhell) on synths and backing vocals. This live show was the basis for their album From Deewee, released March 24.

=== As Heard on Radio Soulwax ===
In 2002, under the name 2manydjs, the Dewaele brothers released the compilation mixtape/mashup album As Heard on Radio Soulwax Pt. 2. The album, structured as a continuous DJ mix, is composed of 45 tracks the Dewaeles were able to clear the rights for. They originally requested rights for 187 tracks and got clearances for 114 of them; 62 were refused, and 11 remained untraceable.

Despite the Pt. 2 in the title, all other albums in the "series", even Pt. 1, are unofficial fan-released bootlegs. Released from 2002 to 2012, they are mostly compiled from the Radio Soulwax and Hang the DJ series of mixes 2manydjs did for radio stations, including Studio Brussel (Belgium), Radio 1 (UK), KISS 100 (UK), and Eins Live (Germany); the last several installments in the series (Pt. 12 to Pt. 15) are bootlegs of mixes from the 2011 incarnation of Radio Soulwax.

=== VIVID Sydney 2011 ===
As part of the Vivid Live Festival in Sydney, David and Stephen Dewaele behind 2manydjs and electro-rock outfit Soulwax presented a one-off series of radio shows on Triple J, an Australian national radio station. The series was broadcast nationally 6 PM nightly from 31 May 2011 to 3 June 2011.

=== Other work ===
The 2001 track "Theme from Discothèque" is by David and Stephen Dewaele from Soulwax, under the name Samantha Fu. They produced this track for a Ghent-based dancegroup called Kung Fu.

On February 2, 2009, Soulwax made a guest appearance on BBC Radio 1, playing 420 song introductions in a period of 60 minutes.

David and Stephen produced Bolis Pupul's debut album Letter to Yu, and recorded it at their studio, Deewee Studios, in Ghent.

In 2015, the Dewaeles founded the record label DEEWEE, operated out of their specially-designed studio in Ghent.

=== Film ===
In 2004, Soulwax compiled the soundtrack for the Belgian movie Steve + Sky. Soulwax contributed three instrumental tracks on this compilation under the name "Kawazaki".

Soulwax's remix of the Rolling Stones' "You Can't Always Get What You Want" is the credit song of, and featured in the movie 21.

Director Saam Farahmand has filmed Soulwax on their international dates (2005–2007), capturing all the excitement, chaos and humour of the world tour. Soulwax filmed 120 shows with one camera in Europe, Japan, U.S., Latin America and Australia. This resulted in two films entitled "Part of the Weekend Never Dies"; a live music film and a documentary which includes 2manydjs, Soulwax Nite Versions and features James Murphy, Nancy Whang, Erol Alkan, Tiga, Justice, Busy P, The Naked Guy, So-Me, Peaches, Kitsuné, Klaxons and many more in behind the scenes footage, interviews, etc. They performed a sold-out gig at the London Royal Festival Hall, during which they did a première of the film. It came out on DVD September 2008.

Soulwax composed the soundtrack for the 2016 film Belgica by Felix Van Groeningen, crediting every song on the soundtrack to a different fictional band.

In 2025, the Dewaeles, under the 2manydjs name, provided the soundtrack for the Netflix film Banger directed by So Me.

=== Radio Soulwax ===
In 2011, Soulwax established a website called Radio Soulwax, in which a continuous mix played all day, featuring 24 hour-long mixes with visuals similar to those used in the 2manydjs live sets, and included music from many decades. These "RSWX hours" have since been made available on Vimeo.

Soulwax - Machine was conceived and directed by Saam Farahmand, who was inspired to create an interpretation of the ethos behind the project. The result is a film featuring model Marilyn Rose that encapsulates the audio-visual obsession of Radio Soulwax, according to Soulwax themselves. The film was previsualised, edited, and post-produced by Andrew Daffy's The House of Curves in London.

=== Soulwax FM ===
Soulwax contributed to the soundtrack of Grand Theft Auto V. They hosted and supplied the playlist to the in-game radio station "Soulwax FM".

== Awards and nominations ==
Year	Awards	Work	Category	Result
1998	Zamu Music Awards	Much Against Everyone's Advice	Album cover	Won
1999	Zamu Music Awards	Soulwax	Live-act	Won
1999	TMF Awards	Soulwax	Best Belgian Rock	Won
1999	TMF Awards	2 Many DJ's	Best Belgian Video	Won
2000	TMF Awards	Soulwax	Best Belgian Rock	Won
2000	TMF Awards	Much Against Everyone's Advice	Best Belgian Video	Won
2002	Zamu Music Awards	2 Many DJ's	Dance	Won
2002	TMF Awards	2 Many DJ's	Best Belgian DJ	Won
2004	Joseph Plateau Awards	Steve + Sky	Best Belgian Composer	Won
2004	TMF Awards	2 Many DJ's	Best Belgian DJ	Won
2005	MTV Europe Music Awards	Soulwax	Best Belgian Act	Nominated
2005	MVPA Awards	"E Talking"	Best International Video	Nominated
2007	Rober Awards Music Poll	Most of the Remixes	Best Various Artists Compilation	Won
2007	PLUG Awards	Nite Versions	DJ Album of the Year	Nominated
2007	DJ Awards	2 Many DJ's	Breakthrough	Nominated
2009	International Dance Music Awards	Soulwax	Best Dance Artist (Group)	Nominated
2011	BT Digital Music Awards	Radio Soulwax iOS	Best Music App	Nominated
2011	BT Digital Music Awards	Radio Soulwax	Best Radio Show or Podcast	Nominated
2011	DJ Awards	2ManyDJ's	Best Eclectic House DJ	Won
2012	UK Music Video Awards	Radio Soulwax - "Machine"	Best Music AD	Nominated
2017	Best Art Vinyl	From Deewee	Best Art Vinyl	Nominated
2017	Music Industry Awards	From Deewee	Best Album	Won
2017	Music Industry Awards	From Deewee	Best Artwork	Nominated
2017	Music Industry Awards	Soulwax	Best Live Act	Nominated
2017	Music Industry Awards	Soulwax	Best Dance Act	Nominated
2018	UK Music Video Awards	"Is It Always Binary"	Best Live Video	Nominated
2020	Grammy Awards	Marie Davidson - "Work It" (Soulwax Remix)	Best Remixed Recording	Nominated

== Discography ==
Adapted from Discogs.

=== Albums ===
Studio albums

- Leave the Story Untold (1996)
- Much Against Everyone's Advice (1998)
- Any Minute Now (2004)
- From Deewee (2017)
- Essential (2018)
- Deewee Sessions, Vol. 1 (2020) (as EMS Synthi 100)
- All Systems Are Lying (2025)

Remix albums

- Nite Versions (2005)

Compilation albums

- This Is Radio Soulwax (2006)
- Most of the remixes... (2007)

Soundtrack albums

- Steve + Sky (2004)
- Belgica (2016)

=== Singles ===
Year	Song	UK Singles Chart	Album
1995	"2nd Handsome Blues" (10" vinyl EP)	—	—
1996	"Kill Your Darlings"	—	Leave the Story Untold
1996	"Great Continental Suicide Note"	—	Leave the Story Untold
1996	"Caramel"	—	Leave the Story Untold
1998	"My Cruel Joke..."	—	Much Against Everyone's Advice
1998	"Conversation Intercom"	65	Much Against Everyone's Advice
1998	"Much Against Everyone's Advice"	56	Much Against Everyone's Advice
1999	"Too Many DJ's"	40	Much Against Everyone's Advice
1999	"When Logics Die"	56	Much Against Everyone's Advice
1999	"Saturday"	—	Much Against Everyone's Advice
2001	"Conversation Intercom" (re-mix)	50	Much Against Everyone's Advice
2004	"Any Minute Now"	34	Any Minute Now
2005	"E Talking"	27	Any Minute Now
2005	"NY Excuse"	35	Any Minute Now
2016	"Heaven Scent (feat. Chloë Sevigny)"	—	—
2016	"Transient Program For Drums And Machinery"	—	From Deewee
2017	"Do You Want To Get Into Trouble?"	—	From Deewee
2017	"Missing Wires"	—	From Deewee
2017	"Close To Paradise"	—	—
2018	"Essential Four"	—	Essential
2020	"Empty Dancefloor"	—	—
2025	"All Systems Are Lying / Run Free"	—	All Systems Are Lying
2025	"New Earth Time"	—	All Systems Are Lying
2025	"Gimme A Reason / Meanwhile On The Continent"	—	All Systems Are Lying
2025	"All Systems Are Lying / Run Free (Nite Versions)"	—	All Systems Are Lying
2026	"Perfect We Are Not"	—	—

=== Remixes ===
Year	Song	Artist
1997	"Stella Maris"	Einstürzende Neubauten
1999	"My Bond With You And Your Planet: Disco!"	Zita Swoon
1999	"Everybody's Weird"	dEUS
1999	"Uma"	Kolk
2000	"Heartbeat"	Tahiti 80
2000	"Muscle Museum"	Muse
2001	"I Sit On Acid"	Lords of Acid
2002	"Can't Get You Out Of My Head" (Soulwax Elektronic Remix)	Kylie Minogue
2002	"Six Days"	DJ Shadow
2002	"Seventeen"	Ladytron
2002	"Hold Your Head Up" (Soulwhacked Mix)	Arthur Argent
2002	"Round Round"	Sugababes
2003	"Make It Happen"	Playgroup
2004	"Rocket Ride" (Soulwax Rock It Right Mix)	Felix Da Housecat
2004	"Daft Punk Is Playing At My House" (Soulwax Shibuya Mix)	LCD Soundsystem
2005	"Dare"	Gorillaz
2005	"Robot Rock"	Daft Punk
2006	"Standing In The Way Of Control" (Soulwax Nite Version)	Gossip
2006	"Lovelight" (Soulwax Ravelight Mix)	Robbie Williams
2007	"Gravity's Rainbow"	Klaxons
2007	"Get Innocuous!"	LCD Soundsystem
2007	"Phantom Pt. II"	Justice
2007	"Ready For The Floor" (Soulwax Dub)	Hot Chip
2007	"Dominator" (Soulwax Edit)	Human Resource vs. 808 State
2007	"Can't Get You Out Of My Head" (Soulwax KYLUSS Remix)	Kylie Minogue
2007	"(I'm Just A Sucker) For a Pretty Face"	West Phillips
2008	"Hey Boy Hey Girl"	The Chemical Brothers
2008	"Kids"	MGMT
2008	"You Can't Always Get What You Want"	The Rolling Stones
2009	"Bonkers" (As Heard On Radio Soulwax Edit)	Dizzee Rascal & Armand Van Helden
2009	"Beep Beep Beep" (Soulwax Edit)	Tiga
2010	"Yeah, Techno!"	Paul Chambers
2010	"You Wanted A Hit"	LCD Soundsystem
2010	"Best In The Class"	Late of the Pier
2010	"A Fifth Of Beethoven" (Soulwax Edit)	Walter Murphy
2012	"Sprawl II (Mountains Beyond Mountains)"	Arcade Fire
2012	"Gabriel"	Joe Goddard
2012	"Synrise"	Goose
2013	"After You" (Pulp Vs. Soulwax)	Pulp
2013	"Her Poolparty"	Ego Troopers
2014	"Love Letters"	Metronomy
2015	"Let It Happen"	Tame Impala
2015	"Huarache Lights"	Hot Chip
2015	"Julia"	Jungle
2016	"Open Up The Sky"	Shock Machine
2016	"New Song"	Warpaint
2016	"3 Rules" (Deewee Unreleased Mix)	Tiga
2017	"Crocodile Boots"	Mixhell & Joe Goddard feat. Mutado Pintado
2017	"Slipping"	Jagwar Ma
2017	"Deadly Valentine"	Charlotte Gainsbourg
2017	"Hot Caramel"	The Peppers
2019	"Cosmic Swimmer"	Tendts
2019	"KITTY KITTY"	De Staat
2019	"Work It"	Marie Davidson
2019	"Ever Again"	Robyn
2020	"What Moves"	LA Priest
2020	"Impact"	SG Lewis, Robyn & Channel Tres
2020	"Something More"	Róisín Murphy
2020	"Midnight Dipper"	Warmduscher
2021	"You Make Me Feel (Mighty Real)" (Soulwax For Despacio Remix)	Sylvester
2021	"A Hero's Death"	Fontaines D.C.
2021	"Whatever Tomorrow"	Chet Faker
2021	"Don't Be Afraid"	Diplo & Damian Lazarus feat. Jungle
2021	"Good Love 2.0"	Priya Ragu
2022	"I Go"	Peggy Gou
2022	"Too Late Now"	Wet Leg
2022	"Cliché"	Charlotte Adigéry & Bolis Pupul
2022	"Odyssée"	Sébastien Tellier
2022	"Sensitive Child"	Oliver Sim
2023	"Request Line" (Soulwax Edit)	Peder Mannerfelt
2024	"Y.A.A.M." (Soulwax Version)	Marie Davidson
2025	"Push Me Fuckhead" (Soulwax Dub Mix)	Marie Davidson
2025	"Sexy Clown" (Soulwax Dub Mix)	Marie Davidson

=== Production for other artists ===
- Tiga - Sexor (2006)
- Tiga - Ciao! (2009)
- Das Pop - Das Pop (2009)
- Peaches - "Talk to Me" (2009)
- Crookers - "We Love Animals" (with Mixhell) (2010)
- Hot Chip - Freakout/Release (2022)
- Charlotte Adigéry & Bolis Pupul - Topical Dancer (2022)
- The Blessed Madonna - "We Still Believe" (2023)
- Bolis Pupul - Letter to Yu (2024)
- Marie Davidson - City of Clowns (2025)
- Angèle - "Trop" (2026)

== Discography as 2manydjs ==
Official compilations

- As Heard on Radio Soulwax Pt. 2 (2002)

Soundtracks

- Banger (2025)

Remixes (officially released)

- Basement Jaxx - "Magnificent Romeo" (mashup of "Romeo" with "The Magnificent Seven" by The Clash, released officially on the 2005 compilation The Singles)
- Mina - "Capisco (2manydjs Edit)" (2020)
- Tiga - "Woke (2manydjs Edit)" (2023)

Unofficial compilations

These unofficial compilations are bootleg recordings of radio shows that 2manydjs did for Studio Brussel.

- 12 albums - As Heard on Radio Soulwax Pt. 0 to As Heard on Radio Soulwax Pt. 11
- Hang All DJs (all volumes)

A bootleg recording of their Essential Mix for BBC Radio 1 in 2005 was released under the title 50,000,000 Soulwax Fans Can't Be Wrong.

== Record collection ==
As sons of radio and TV host Zaki, the Dewaele Brothers grew up among vinyl records and started collecting them themselves. On 26 March 2014, students of the PXL university digitalized 5.000 of the more than 40.000 vinyl records owned by the Dewaele Brothers. As a gift back, the brothers played a set at a student afterparty.
