= Belief (Nitzer Ebb album) =

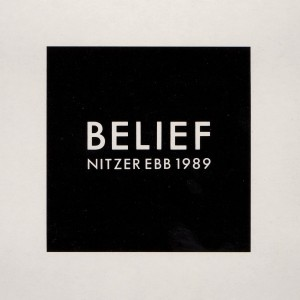

Studio album by Nitzer Ebb
- Released: 1989
- Recorded: 1988
- Genre: EBM
- Length: 37:25
- Label: Mute (UK); STUMM 61; Geffen/Warner Bros. (U.S.); GHS 24213
- Producer: Flood

Nitzer Ebb chronology
That Total Age (1987)	Belief (1989)	Showtime (1990)

Singles from Belief
- 1. "Control, I'm Here" Released: 1988; 2. "Hearts & Minds" Released: 1989; 3. "Shame" Released: 1989

Professional ratings
Review scores
Source	Rating
AllMusic	3/5 stars

Belief is the second studio album by the British EBM group Nitzer Ebb. It was the first album recorded with drummer Julian Beeston (who took over from David Gooday), and Flood took over as producer from Phil Harding. It was released by Mute Records in 1989.

The fifth song on the album, "T.W.A.", appears to have been inspired by the Hezbollah hijacking of TWA flight 847 in 1985.

In a 1989 retrospective for Rolling Stone, Jim Farber wrote that the music video for "Control, I'm Here" had "the most harshly industrial visuals of the year".

== Track listing ==
1. "Hearts & Minds" – 3:45
2. "For Fun" – 3:03
3. "Control, I'm Here" – 3:52
4. "Captivate" – 3:57
5. "T.W.A." – 5:00
6. "Blood Money" – 4:29
7. "Shame" – 4:03
8. "Drive" – 5:07
9. "Without Belief" – 4:16
