= Nitzer Ebb =

British EBM band

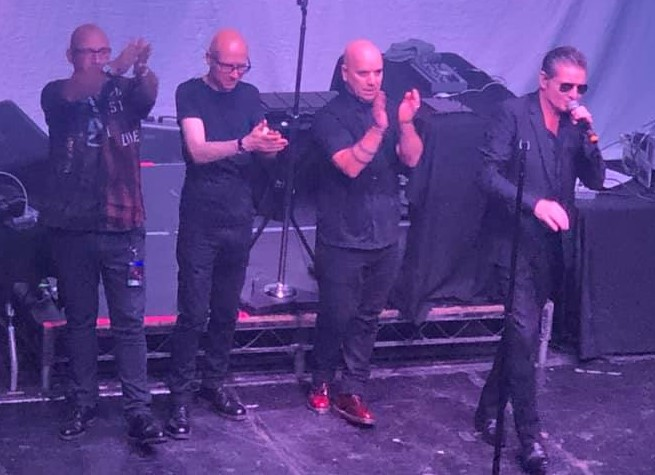
- Nitzer Ebb Concert in Los Angeles, October 2019. Left to Right: David Gooday, Simon Granger, Bon Harris and Douglas McCarthy

Background information
- Origin: Chelmsford, Essex, England
- Genres: EBM, industrial dance, electronic, industrial rock (1990s)
- Years active: 1982–1995, 2006–present
- Labels: Mute Records; Geffen Records (US)
- Members: Bon Harris; David Gooday; Jason Payne
- Past members: Douglas McCarthy; Duc Nhan Nguyen; Julian Beeston

Nitzer Ebb (/ˈnaɪtsər ɛb, ˈnɪt-/) are an English EBM group formed in 1982 by Essex school friends, vocalist Vaughan "Bon" Harris, guitarist/vocalist Douglas McCarthy, and keyboardist/drummer David Gooday. The band was originally named La Comédie De La Mort but soon discarded that and chose the name Nitzer Ebb by cutting up words and letters and arranging them randomly to create something Germanic without using actual German words.

== History ==
=== Initial releases (1983–1987) ===
The group released their demo Basic Pain Procedure in 1983, but it was two years until they met PWL producer Phil Harding, who produced their 1985 debut single "Isn't It Funny How Your Body Works?" and helped them set up their own label, Power Of Voice Communications. The band at the time was inspired by the post-punk scene and specifically acts like "Siouxsie and the Banshees, Killing Joke and Bauhaus who were having a big influence on us, in some ways stylistically but also in the energy that they gave".

They released three more singles on their own label, "Warsaw Ghetto" (1985), "Warsaw Ghetto Remixes" (1986) and "Let Your Body Learn" (1986), before signing to Mute Records in 1986. The singles "Murderous" (1986) and "Let Your Body Learn" (1987) followed, building their reputation in the Industrial Rock and EBM scenes, as well as making inroads into the developing Chicago House scene.

"Join in the Chant" (1987) became part of the Balearic beat scene that influenced the UK acid house scene.

=== International success, disbandment (1987–1995) ===
Their debut album That Total Age was released in 1987. Depeche Mode invited them to open for the European leg of their successful Music for the Masses Tour in 1987. David Gooday left after the tour and they completed their next album Belief (1989) as a duo. Mark 'Flood' Ellis became their new producer. They recruited Julian Beeston to assist them on their own world tour, and he soon became a regular contributor both on and off stage.

In 1989, they teamed with German EBM pioneers Die Krupps to re-record their 1981 single "Wahre Arbeit – Wahrer Lohn" as "The Machineries of Joy".

The third Nitzer Ebb album Showtime, released in 1990, revealed a less confrontational sound. The single "Fun to Be Had" (1990) featured a remix by George Clinton and was a hit on the US dance charts.

Their fourth album, Ebbhead (1991), showcased a more traditional songwriting style with an emphasis on melodic choruses was produced by Alan Wilder from Depeche Mode and Flood. They promoted the album with a global tour that took them from the southern U.S. to northern Siberia (in the Siberian city of Barnaul).

Their fifth album, Big Hit (1995), featured a greater use of 'real' instruments, especially guitars and drums. McCarthy and Harris recruited Jason Payne (percussion), to their main line-up and brought in guitarist John Napier to assist with live performances.

Big Hit was the final release by the band for almost 15 years. McCarthy was a regular collaborator with Alan Wilder's Recoil project, and he recorded with French electronic producer Terence Fixmer as Fixmer/McCarthy. Harris moved to Los Angeles, where he became a successful producer and recorded as 13mg and as a member of Maven.

=== Reunion (2006–present) ===
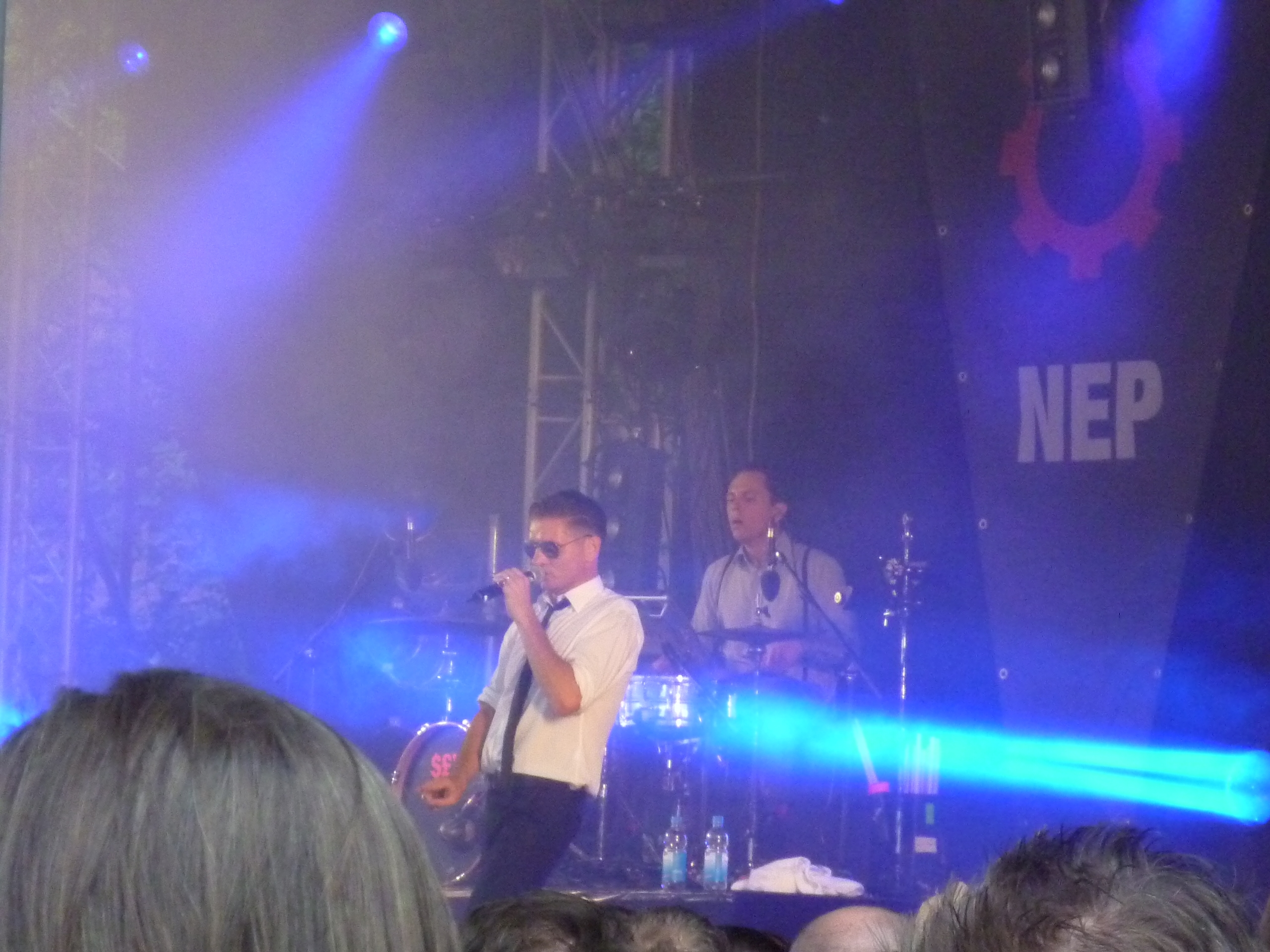
Nitzer Ebb performing in 2011

Nitzer Ebb began work on new material in Los Angeles in early 2007, with a retrospective documentary still in the pipeline. During 2007, Nitzer Ebb continued its trend of replacing drummers as Kourtney Klein left the band to be replaced by Jason Payne. A first track, "Once You Say", with Depeche Mode songwriter Martin L. Gore on backing vocals, was played in June 2007 by Dave Clarke in his White Noise show on VPRO's 3 Voor 12. This track, along with "Payroll", were debuted live as Nitzer Ebb played a handful of shows and festivals during 2007. These tracks were then featured on Nitzer Ebb's album, Industrial Complex.

Harris and McCarthy reunited up with drummer Jason Payne and producer Flood to finish up the first new Nitzer Ebb record in over a decade. In the meantime, Fixmer/McCarthy released its second album in June 2008, Into the Night.

The band announced a US tour for fall–winter 2009 and were selected as the opening act of the January and February European and Russian dates of Depeche Mode's Tour of the Universe in 2010.

In 2019, the band announced a North American tour that included the original band members David Gooday and Simon Granger. In 2021, the band continued more tour dates including in Europe.

During the COVID-19 pandemic, Harris and McCarthy got together to work on a side project called D-R-A-G. In November 2021, McCarthy collapsed before a show in Palm Beach, Florida, and had to go to the hospital. The band emphasized it was due to complications from a pre-existing illness and it had nothing to do with COVID-19. The band went on to perform with Harris on lead vocals.

In March 2024, McCarthy announced he was forced to withdraw from Nitzer Ebb's foreseeable shows due to health concerns, regarding his diagnosis of cirrhosis of the liver. He stated: "I won't be performing any live shows as Nitzer Ebb, Fixmer/McCarthy or any other vehicle, until I can do so safely and stress-free for myself and the amazing people I have around me who continue to stand by my side in full support of getting me better." Nitzer Ebb has continued to tour with Harris taking over fully on vocals, for the foreseeable future. On 11 June 2025 the band announced that McCarthy had died.

== Band members ==
=== Members ===
- Bon Harris – lead vocals, keyboards, programming, drums, bass (1982–present)
- David Gooday – keyboards, percussion, backing vocals (1982–1987, 2019–present), drums (1982–1987, 2019–2025)
- Jason Payne – drums (1992–1995, 2007–2019, 2025–present)

=== Former members ===
- Douglas McCarthy – lead vocals, guitars (1982–2025; his death; not touring during 2024–2025)
- Duc Nhan Nguyen – drums (1987–1988)
- Julian Beeston – drums (1989–1992)

=== Touring members ===
- David Lovering – drums (1994–1995)
- John Napier – guitars, percussion (1995)
- Kourtney Klein – drums (2006–2007)
- Rona Rougeheart – percussion (2024)

== Discography ==
=== Studio albums ===
Year	Album details	Chart peak positions			Certifications (sales thresholds)
Year	Album details	UK	US	SWE	Certifications (sales thresholds)
1987	That Total Age: Released: 11 May 1987; Labels: Mute, Geffen; Formats: CD, LP, CS, digital download	—	—	—	
1989	Belief: Released: 9 January 1989; Labels: Mute, Geffen; Formats: CD, LP, CS, digital download	—	—	30	
1990	Showtime: Released: 28 September 1990; Labels: Mute, Geffen; Formats: CD, LP, CS, digital download	—	—	—	
1991	Ebbhead: Released: 30 September 1991; Labels: Mute, Geffen; Formats: CD, LP, CS, digital download	—	146	42	
1995	Big Hit: Released: 27 March 1995; Labels: Mute, Geffen; Formats: CD, LP, CS, digital download	126	—	—	
2010	Industrial Complex: Released: 22 January 2010; Labels: Major Records, Alfa Matrix; Formats: CD, LP, digital download	—	—	35	
"—" denotes albums that were released but did not chart, or albums not released in a particular territory.

=== EPs and demo ===
Year	Album details	Chart peak positions			Certifications (sales thresholds)
Year	Album details	UK	US	SWE	Certifications (sales thresholds)
1983	Basic Pain Procedure (Demo): Released: 1983; Labels: Self-released; Formats: CS	—	—	—	
1989	The Machineries of Joy (EP): Released: 26 June 1989; Labels: Mute, Geffen, BCM Records; Formats: CD, LP	—	—	—	
1991	As Is (EP): Released: 10 June 1991; Labels: Mute, Geffen; Formats: CD, LP, CS, digital download	—	—	—	
2011	Join in the Rhythm of Machines (EP): Released: 20 April 2011; Labels: Major Records; Formats: CD	—	—	—	
"—" denotes albums that were released but did not chart, or albums not released in a particular territory.

=== Compilations ===
Year	Album details	Chart peak positions			Certifications (sales thresholds)
Year	Album details	UK	US	SWE	Certifications (sales thresholds)
1988	So Bright So Strong: Released: 1988; Labels: Upfront, TELDEC; Formats: CD, LP	—	—	—	
2006	Body of Work: Released: 26 June 2006; Labels: Mute; Formats: CD, LP, digital download	—	—	—	
2006	Body Rework: Released: 31 July 2006; Labels: Mute Records Limited, Novamute; Formats: CD, 2xLP, digital download	—	—	—	
2010	In Order: Released: 22 January 2010; Labels: Mute; Formats: digital download	—	—	—	
"—" denotes albums that were released but did not chart, or albums not released in a particular territory.

=== Soundtracks ===
- Saw IV – "Payroll (John O Mix)" (2007)
- Grand Theft Auto IV – "Let Your Body Learn" (2008)
- NCIS – "Promises" (2009)
- Saw VI – "Never Known" (2009)
- Saw VII – "Promises" (2010)
- Castle – "Kiss Kiss Bang Bang" (2010)
- Tony Hawk: Ride (video game) – "Kiss Kiss Bang Bang" (2010)
- The Following – "Murderous" (2013)

=== Singles ===
List of singles, with selected chart positions, showing year released and album name
Title	Year	Peak chart positions			Album
Title	Year	UK	US Dance	US Alt.	Album
"Isn't It Funny How Your Body Works"	1985	—	—	—	Non-album singles
"Warsaw Ghetto"	1985	—	—	—	Non-album singles
"So Bright, So Strong"	1985	—	—	—	Non-album singles
"Get Clean"	1986	—	—	—	Non-album singles
"Murderous"	1986	—	—	—	That Total Age
"Let Your Body Learn"	1987	—	—	—	That Total Age
"Join in the Chant"	1987	—	9	—	That Total Age
"Control I'm Here"	1988	100	14	25	Belief
"Hearts and Minds"	1989	—	16	—	Belief
"Shame"	1989	—	—	—	Belief
"The Machineries of Joy" (Die Krupps with Nitzer Ebb)	1989	—	25	—	Non-album single
"Lightning Man"	1990	97	14	28	Showtime
"Fun to Be Had"	1990	99	5	—	Showtime
"Getting Closer"	1990	—	—	—	Showtime
"I Give to You"	1991	—	—	27	Ebbhead
"Godhead"	1991	56	—	—	Ebbhead
"Ascend"	1992	52	—	—	Ebbhead
"Kick It"	1995	75	—	—	Big Hit
"I Thought"	1995	—	—	—	Big Hit
"—" denotes a recording that did not chart or was not released in that territory.

=== B-sides and non-album tracks ===
Song	A-side	Year
"The Way You Live"	"Isn't It Funny How Your Body Works"	1985
"Crane"	"Isn't It Funny How Your Body Works"	1985
"Cold War"	"Isn't It Funny How Your Body Works"	1985
"So Bright, So Strong"	"Warsaw Ghetto"	1985
"Get Clean"	"Let Your Body Learn"	1986
"K.I.A."	"Control I'm Here"	1988
"Time Slips By"	"Hearts and Minds"	1989
"Backlash"	"Shame"	1989
"Who We Are"	"Lightning Man"	1990
"Out of Mind"	"Fun to Be Had"	1990
"Taken From Me (Servant Mix)"	"Fun to Be Had"	1990
"Lovesick"	'As Is' EP	1991
"Come Alive"	'As Is' EP	1991
"Higher"	'As Is' EP	1991
"Stray Cat Blues"	"I Give to You"	1991
"Skintight"	"Kick It"	1995
"Dead & Gone"	"Kick It"	1995
"Friend (Brittle Mix)"	"I Thought"	1995
"Beats Me"	"I Thought"	1995
"Payroll (John O Mix)"	Saw IV Soundtrack	2007
"Promises"	NCIS (The Official TV Series Soundtrack)	2009
"Never Known"	Saw VI Soundtrack	2009

=== Music videos ===
- So Bright, So Strong (1985)
- Murderous (1987)
- Let Your Body Learn (1987)
- Control I'm Here (1988)
- Hearts and Minds (1989)
- Shame (1989)
- The Machineries of Joy (1989)
- Lightning Man (1990)
- Fun to Be Had (1990)
- Family Man (1991)
- I Give to You (1991)
- Godhead (1992)
- Ascend (1992)
- Kick It (1995)
- I Thought (1995)
