= Nite Versions =

Remix album by Soulwax
- Released: 26 September 2005
- Studios: Soulwax (Ghent, Belgium)
- Genres: Dance-punk; electroclash; electro house
- Length: 51:42
- Label: PIAS
- Producer: Soulwax

Soulwax chronology
Any Minute Now (2004)	Nite Versions (2005)	Most of the Remixes (2007)

Professional ratings
Review scores
Source	Rating
AllMusic	3.5/5 stars
Pitchfork Media	8.2/10

Nite Versions is the first remix album by Soulwax, released on 26 September 2005 through PIAS. The album comprises remixes of songs from their third studio album, Any Minute Now.

== History ==
The remix album's name is a nod to the "Night Versions" of Duran Duran's songs, which were extended dance remixes intended for nightclub play.

The album opens with Soulwax's own take on Daft Punk's 1997 song "Teachers"; a hidden track is also present before the start of track 1. The 51-second instrumental is untitled but is an alternate version of the guitar riff from the original version of E Talking. Trevor Jackson produced the album artwork.

In 2012, Nite Versions was awarded a double silver certification from the Independent Music Companies Association, which indicated sales of at least 40,000 copies throughout Europe. "Another Excuse" and "Compute" are featured in Test Drive Unlimited.

In 2020, the album was re-released for its 15th anniversary. The re-release included a special repressing on pink and white vinyl and a rework of "NY Lipps" with a spoken-word performance by LCD Soundsystem's Nancy Whang.

== Track listing ==
All tracks are written by David Dewaele and Stephen Dewaele. Co-writers noted below.

No.	Title	Writer(s)	Notes	Length
0.	"[hidden track]" (pregap track)			0:54
1.	"Teachers"	Thomas Bangalter; Guy-Manuel de Homem-Christo		2:28
2.	"Miserable Girl"			4:10
3.	"E Talking"			5:39
4.	"Accidents and Compliments"			6:08
5.	"Compute"			5:31
6.	"Slowdance"			6:18
7.	"I Love Techno"			4:04
8.	"KracK"			5:23
9.	"NY Lipps"	Steven Greenberg; James Murphy; Nancy Whang	Mashup of Lipps Inc.'s Funkytown with Soulwax's NY Excuse	4:10
10.	"Another Excuse"	James Murphy; Nancy Whang	DFA remix	7:51
Total length:				51:42 (Note: without hidden track); 52:36 (Note: with hidden track)

15 year anniversary edition tracklisting
No.	Title	Writer(s)	Length
1.	"Teachers"	Thomas Bangalter; Guy-Manuel de Homem-Christo	2:12
2.	"Miserable Girl"		4:43
3.	"E Talking"		6:07
4.	"Accidents and Compliments"		6:26
5.	"Compute"		6:05
6.	"Slowdance"		5:56
7.	"I Love Techno"		6:13
8.	"KracK"		5:26
9.	"NY Lipps (Kawazaki dub)"	Steven Greenberg; James Murphy; Nancy Whang	5:42
10.	"Another Excuse (DFA remix)"	James Murphy; Nancy Whang	8:00
11.	"NY Lipps (Dries van Noten 2020 remix)"	Steven Greenberg; James Murphy; Nancy Whang	14:02
Total length:			70:57
