= Libera Award for Best Dance/Electronic Record =

Annual US music award

- Awarded for: quality dance and electronic music albums
- Country: United States
- Presented by: American Association of Independent Music (A2IM)
- First award: 2017
- Currently held by: Bicep, Water (Dance); Odesza, The Last Goodbye (Electronic) (2023)
- Website: liberaawards.com

The Libera Award for Best Dance/Electronic Record (known as Best Dance/Electronic Album prior to 2021) is an award presented by the American Association of Independent Music at the annual Libera Award which recognizes "best dance or electronic music album released commercially in the United States by an independent label" since 2017. The first recipient of the awards was British musician Bonobo for his album Migration.

At the 2022 ceremony, the award was split into two categories: Best Dance Record and Best Electronic Record.

== Winners and nominees ==
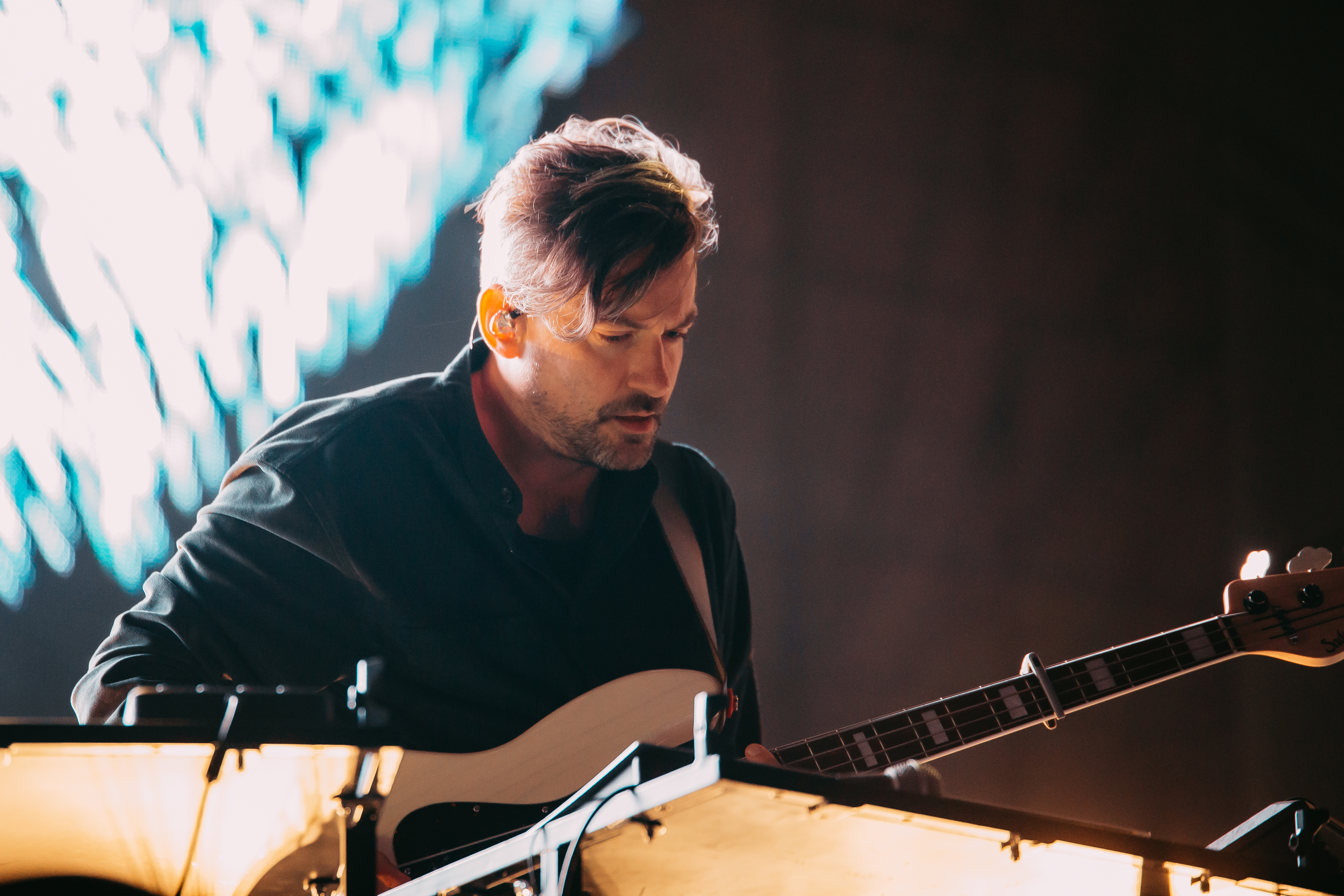
Bonobo was the inaugural winner in 2017.

Year	Winner(s)	Work	Nominees	Ref.
2017	Bonobo	Migration	Hopelessness – Anohni; Mayday – Boys Noize; The Mountain Will Fall – DJ Shadow; Skin – Flume; Ears – Kaitlyn Aurelia Smith; Epoch – Tycho	
2018	Sylvan Esso	What Now	Bicep – Bicep; New Energy – Four Tet; Sirens – Nicolas Jaar; Good Time (Original Motion Picture Soundtrack) – Oneohtrix Point Never; EP2 – Yaeji	
2019	Yves Tumor	Safe in the Hands of Love	Nothing Is Still – Leon Vynehall; Singularity – Jon Hopkins; Oil of Every Pearl's Un-Insides – Sophie; Age Of – Oneohtrix Point Never	
2020	Flying Lotus	Flamagra	Proto – Holly Herndon; Anima – Thom Yorke; Weather – Tycho; A Bath Full of Ecstasy – Hot Chip	
2021	Caribou	Suddenly	Kick I – Arca; Acts of Rebellion – Ela Minus; What We Drew – Yaeji; Karma & Desire – Actress	
2022	Best Dance Record			
2022	Jungle	Loving in Stereo	DJ-Kicks: Disclosure – Disclosure; "Loose Your Mind" – Dawn Richard; "Original Classic" – Keys N Krates; "Stay High again.." (Fred again.. & Joy Anonymous Remix) – Brittany Howard; You've Got the Whole Night to Go – Logic1000	
2022	Best Electronic Record			
2022	Park Hye Jin	Before I Die	Kick III – Arca; Second Line – Dawn Richard; Yasuke – Flying Lotus; "You Can Do It" – Caribou	
2023	Best Dance Record			
2023	Bicep	"Water"	"Good Times/Problemz" – Jungle; "Happy Ending" – Kelela; "Can't Stop Thinking About" – Logic1000; "Strong" – Romy featuring Fred Again...; "DJ Kicks" – Theo Parrish	
2023	Best Electronic Record			
2023	Odesza	The Last Goodbye	Fragments – Bonobo; Topical Dancer – Charlotte Adigéry and Bolis Pupul; I Love You Jennifer B – Jockstrap; Let's Turn It into Sound – Kaitlyn Aurelia Smith; Nymph – Shygirl; No Rules Sandy – Sylvan Esso	

== Multiple nominations and awards ==
=== Artists that received multiple nominations ===
2 nominations

- Arca
- Caribou
- Dawn Richard
- Flying Lotus
- Oneohtrix Point Never
- Tycho
- Yaeji
- Bicep
- Jungle
- Logic1000
- Bonobo
- Kaitlyn Aurelia Smith
- Sylvan Esso
