= Performer (disambiguation) =

A performer is an artist in the performing arts.

(The) Performer(s) may also refer to:

== Places ==
- Performers College, Corringham, Essex, England, UK
- Performers House, a defunct folk high school in Silkeborg, Denmark

== Music ==
=== Albums ===
- The Performer (James Righton album), 2020
- The Performer (Marty Robbins album), 1978

=== Songs ===
- "Performer", a song by Rebecca Black from Let Her Burn
- "Performer", a song by Trey Songz
- "The Performer", a song by James Righton, the title track of the album The Performer (James Righton album)
- "The Performer", a song by Marty Robbins, the title track of the album The Performer (Marty Robbins album)

== Stage and screen ==
- The Performers (play), 2012 play
- The Performers (TV series), 1972 Canadian TV show
- The Performers (film) (Japanese: 花と涙と炎), 1970 Japanese film directed by Umetsugu Inoue

== Other uses ==
- Performer (magazine), an American music magazine
- Performer (role variant), in the Keirsey Temperament Sorter
- OpenGL Performer, a commercial software library based on OpenGL

== See also ==
- Performance (disambiguation)
- Doer (disambiguation)
