= Letter to Yu =

Studio album by Bolis Pupul
- Released: 8 March 2024
- Studios: Deewee, Ghent, Belgium
- Genres: EDM; East Asian music; synthpop
- Length: 45:56
- Label: Deewee
- Producers: David Dewaele; Stephen Dewaele; Boris Zeebroek

Bolis Pupul chronology
Topical Dancer (with Charlotte Adigéry) (2022)	Letter to Yu (2024)	Mainland Madinina (with Charlotte Adigéry) (2027)

Singles from Letter to Yu
- 1. "Completely Half" Released: 29 November 2023; 2. "Spicy Crab" Released: 18 January 2024; 3. "Ma Tau Wai Road" Released: 16 February 2024

Letter to Yu is the solo debut album by Belgian musician Boris Zeebroek under the name Bolis Pupul. It was released on 8 March 2024, by Soulwax's record label Deewee. Pupul produced the album with Soulwax's Stephen and David Dewaele, recording at their studio in Ghent.

The album was inspired by Pupul's mother who died in 2008, and by subsequent travels to her native Hong Kong. It centers on a letter Pupul wrote to his late mother. The album mixes electronic dance music, East Asian music, and synthpop, and also includes field recordings from Hong Kong. It was received positively by critics.

== Background ==
The album was inspired by Pupul's Hong Kong-born Chinese mother, Yu Wei Wun, who died in a car accident in 2008. Pupul took a trip to Hong Kong in 2018, and per a statement, "On the first day I arrived in the city I visited the street where she was born and wrote her a letter. This letter became the centerpiece of my record." After returning from Hong Kong, Pupul read part of the letter to the Dewaele brothers while also showing them demos. Their enthusiasm inspired the confidence for Pupul to record the whole letter, ultimately making it "the coat rack on which the entire record was hung."

The album is Pupul's solo debut. He had previously released the album Topical Dancer, a collaboration with Charlotte Adigéry, in 2022.

== Recording and release ==
Pupul recorded the album at Soulwax's Deewee Studios in Ghent, and produced it along with Soulwax's Stephen and David Dewaele.

The album was announced on 29 November 2023, with a release date on 8 March 2024, by Soulwax's record label Deewee. With the announcement came the lead single, "Completely Half", and a music video shot in Hong Kong by director Bieke Depoorter. The album's cover art was derived from the music video shoot. The song has been described as a "simmering slice of slinky synthpop". The album's second single, "Spicy Crab", was released on 19 January 2024. The third single, "Ma Tau Wai Road", was released on 16 February, featuring vocals from Pupul's sister Sarah, credited on the record as Salah Pupul. It is named after the street in Hong Kong where their mother was born, and inspired by learning that the maternity clinic where she was born had since become a nursing home.

== Style ==
Letter to Yu is an electronic dance music album which blends East Asian music – most notably Yellow Magic Orchestra – with Western synthpop. A number of tracks consist of electropop directly inspired by Kowloon. Songs also include instances of field recordings from Hong Kong, including the sounds of frogs, the voice of a doctor Pupul visited, and sounds from a train platform on "Completely Half".

== Reception ==
Letter to Yu ratings
Aggregate scores
Source	Rating
AnyDecentMusic?	7.6/10
Metacritic	83/100
Review scores
Source	Rating
AllMusic	4/5 stars
The Arts Desk	4/5 stars
The Guardian	4/5 stars
Loud and Quiet	7/10
MusicOMH	4/5 stars
Pitchfork	8/10
PopMatters	8/10

According to the review aggregator Metacritic, Letter to Yu received "universal acclaim" based on a weighted average score of 83 out of 100 from 9 critic scores. Loud and Quiet's Joe Goggins called Letter to Yu "an endearingly intimate album that captures the thrill of Zeebroek's immersion in his ancestry." PopMatters's Steve Horowitz wrote that "Something is inviting about the Chinese touches on Western dance floor beats. Bolis Pupul belongs to both worlds and invites one to appreciate the connections and juxtapositions between them." De Tijd's Tom Peeters called the album a "remarkably digestible piece of work." The Arts Desk's Joe Muggs called the album "quite a magical record that honestly doesn't need all that much explanation to enjoy hugely." Pitchfork's Eric Torres wrote that "Pupul imbues his songs with personality and soul, unearthing complicated truths about his relationship to his heritage while finding welcome release on the dancefloor." Resident Advisor's Marshall Gu wrote that the album "bops and bangs as [Pupul] explores throbbing Detroit techno and bouncy Kraftwerkian synth pop, overlaying those genres with recordings of his time in Hong Kong to create a deeply spiritual album that fuses traditions, lineages and memories."

== Track listing ==
All lyrics are written by Boris Zeebroek; all music is composed by Zeebroek, David Dewaele, and Stephen Dewaele.

Letter to Yu track listing
No.	Title	Length
1.	"Letter to Yu"	3:01
2.	"Completely Half"	4:20
3.	"Goodnight Mr Yi"	3:17
4.	"Frogs"	4:34
5.	"Doctor Says"	4:02
6.	"Spicy Crab"	4:46
7.	"Ma Tau Wei Road" (featuring Salah Pupul)	3:59
8.	"Causeway Bae"	3:55
9.	"Cantonese"	4:52
10.	"Kowloon"	5:24
11.	"Cosmic Rendez-Vous"	3:46
Total length:		45:56

== Personnel ==
- Boris Zeebroek – vocals, production
- Stephen Dewaele – production
- David Dewaele – production
- Frank Merritt – mastering
- Mike Marsh – digital mastering
- Ill Studio – creative direction
- Thomas Le Provost – graphic design
- Bieke Depoorter – photography
- Magnum Photos – photography
- Brian K. Smith – recording, samples (track 3)
- Salah Pupul – vocals (track 7)
- Marvis Chan – vocals (track 8)
- Wei Wun Yu – vocals (track 11)

== Charts ==
Chart performance for Letter to Yu
Chart (2024)	Peak position
Belgian Albums (Ultratop Flanders)	9
