= Folamour =

French DJ and producer

- Folamour in Amsterdam in 2023

Background information
- Born: Bruno Boumendil; 1990 (age 35–36); Lyon, France
- Genres: Electronic, house, disco, French house
- Years active: 2014–present
- Website: folamour.love

Bruno Boumendil (born 1990), known artistically as Folamour (French: [fɔlamuʁ]), is a French DJ, producer, and the founder of FHUO Records. Considered an influential figure in the recent revival of French house and disco producers, his diverse catalog includes albums, EPs, and remixes, featuring a blend of house grooves and disco textures. Known for his dynamic performances and versatile sets, Folamour has established himself in the underground house scene with his sample-based four-on-the-floor tracks.

== Career ==
Folamour's early work spanned genres from pop to jazz, eventually leading him to focus on house music. His music is deeply influenced by his upbringing in Lyon, a city that played a crucial role in his artistic development. His early life was marked by frequent moves and a sense of displacement, which drove him to immerse himself in music and literature. Folamour is trained in guitar, drums, bass, and percussion.

Folamour first gained recognition with his debut EP, Deeply Rooted Vibes, released around 2014. This EP marked the beginning of his career in house music, characterized by a blend of house grooves, disco textures, and emotional depth. His second album, Ordinary Drugs, was released in February 2019, following his 2017 debut album Umami. Umami is an 11-track LP characterized by its blend of house, disco swing, and future jazz, and is inspired by Folamour's appreciation for Japanese culture.

In 2019, Folamour performed 140 gigs worldwide. The year 2020 marked a hiatus from touring, during which he focused on refining his production skills. On February 6, 2021, he released the single "Just Want Happiness," which came in advance of his upcoming album, the details of which had yet to be announced at the time. In March 2021, Folamour released the eponymous single "The Journey" ahead of his upcoming album, which was released in June of that year. The album, described as a personal project exploring themes of love and freedom, was well-received and marked a shift from using samples and computers to writing original texts and recording live instruments. The Journey featured collaborations with SG Lewis, Tertia May, and Zimbabwean artist Zeke Manyika. In a review for Clash Magazine, Ben Miles rated the album 8 out of 10 and described it as a bold shift from Folamour's earlier sample-based house sound. Moving away from 70s and 80s disco influences, the album embraces live instruments like acoustic drums and electric guitar, showcasing his "extensive musicality". He highlights that tracks such as "The Journey" and "Lost in Space" mix house, techno, and pop, pushing his music toward mainstream appeal. Miles also notes the rhythmic experiments and lush synths in songs like "We Gotta Wake Up This World From Its Sleep," signaling what he saw as Folamour's evolution from DJ to composer. Following The Journey's release, Folamour resumed his extensive touring, performing across the United States and Europe.

Following The Journey, Folamour released the single "Fearless" in April 2022 and "Alive" in December 2022. "Fearless" had become a staple in his DJ sets prior to its official release, generating significant anticipation among fans. It marked Folamour's first release since The Journey. "Alive" marked a continuation of Folamour's evolving approach to music production. Departing from the use of samples, he wrote and recorded his own vocals for the track, incorporating live instrumentation such as orchestral strings, live piano, and electronic drums and bass.

In May 2023, Folamour released his fifth studio album, Manifesto, through Columbia France, Ultra, and his own FHUO Records imprint. This 14-track album took two years to complete and was described by Folamour as a deeply personal project that explores themes of love and freedom. It features collaborations with Amadou & Mariam, Baccus, Jungle By Night, Khazali, Emmanuel Jal, and Tim Ayre. It was described by Mixmag as "building on signature house sound while also venturing into new sonic territories." This album continued to showcase Folamour's ability to blend different musical styles and work with a wide range of collaborators.

In 2024, to celebrate a decade in the industry, Folamour embarked on a series of special releases, beginning with Pressure Makes Diamonds, a single characterized by sentimental chords, disco influences, and pitched-down vocals. The track reflects his experiences growing up in Lyon. He also organized a free open-air launch party in Lyon's Parc des Berges as part of his Decade Together Tour, paying tribute to the city that had supported him during his formative years as an artist.

Folamour has performed at renowned venues and festivals globally, including the Olympia in Paris, Ancienne Belgique in Brussels, Paradiso in Amsterdam, and Printworks in London. He has also performed at major festivals such as such as Glastonbury, Tomorrowland, Sónar, Gala, Pete The Monkey, Marsatac, Parklife, Kappa FuturFestival, Karrusel, and Cabourg Mon Amour. By December 2022, he had played over 500 live dates internationally. He has been recognized for his ability to connect with audiences and create distinctive atmospheres during his performances.

Folamour has been recognized in Mixmag's lists of "The 21 Top DJs Of The Year" in 2021 and "Top Live Acts Of The Year" in 2022. The magazine has described him as "one of the most sought after ticket-sellers in the game" and as "not just a DJ but also a performer."

In addition to his solo work, Folamour co-founded the label Moonrise Hill Material in 2017 and has collaborated with Lyon's National Orchestra. In August 2022, Folamour launched record label House of Love. The label was introduced with the release of an EP by French DJ/producer Kousto, titled When We Were There. This four-track EP, which includes the lead track "Friendship For Lovers" and a collaboration with Folamour titled "Jungle Bird," explores the concept of "future memories of the past." Folamour has stated that he envisioned the label as a space without musical limits, where any track that resonated emotionally would find a home. Through these ventures, Folamour has played a significant role in shaping the modern French house and disco scene.

His musical output includes releases on various labels, such as All City, Glitterbox, Classic Music Company, Church, Kyoku Records, as well as his own label, FHUO Records.

Following the release of his album Movement Therapy in 2025, Folamour announced a series of "5-hour set" marathon performances for 2026. This tour included a high-profile show at La Laiterie in Strasbourg, designed to provide an immersive "dance therapy" experience that blended his signature house, disco, and jazz influences.

== Discography ==
=== Albums and EPs ===
- Deeply Rooted Vibes (EP) (2014)
- CellarDoor EP (2015)
- Oyabun (EP)
- 4MYPPL#1 (2017)
- Nights Over You (EP) (2017)
- The Power and The Blessing of Unity (EP) (2017)
- Umami (2017)
- Feelings For Ur Own Revolution (2018)
- Club Degli Esploratori (2018)
- Melophrenia (2018)
- Ordinary Drugs (2019)
- The Journey (2021)
- Manifesto (2023)
- Movement Therapy (2025)
- Danse Méditerranée (2026)

=== Singles ===
- "Shakkei" (2017)
- "Devoted To U" (2018)
- "I Miss Having Someone To Talk To" (2020)
- "Sun After Rain" (2020) (with Jitwam)
- "Just Want Happiness" (2021)
- "Fearless" (2022)
- "Birds" (2022)
- "My People" (2022)
- "Alive" (2022)
- "Freedom" (2023)
- "Friends" (2023)
- "Post Tenebras Lux" (2023)
- "Pressure Makes Diamonds" (2024)
