= Fergus "Fergadelic" Purcell =

British graphic designer and illustrator (b. 1970)

Fergus Purcell (born 1970), known professionally as Fergadelic, is a British graphic designer, illustrator, and artist. The pseudonym, adopted in the 1990s, was inspired by graffiti writers and the secret identities of comic-book superheroes. He created the Penrose triangle "Tri-Ferg" logo for Palace Skateboards and co-founded the London streetwear label Aries with designer Sofia Prantera. He has worked with brands including Gucci, Burberry, Marc Jacobs, Stella McCartney, and Tommy Hilfiger, for whom he redesigned the brand's monogram in 2022.

Purcell studied at Central Saint Martins and has worked at the intersection of streetwear, fashion, and graphic art since the early 1990s. He is also a musician, playing drums in the Krautrock group Die Verboten alongside members of Soulwax and Riton, and is credited as a beatbox performer on the Beta Band's 1999 debut album.

== Early life and education ==
Purcell was born in 1970 to Irish parents and grew up in Amersham, Buckinghamshire. His family lived briefly in Australia during his childhood, where a schoolteacher introduced him to an Ed Emberley drawing book, which he has cited as an early influence. Back in England, he developed formative interests in skateboard graphics, underground comics, and the illustrations of artists such as Pushead and the Santa Cruz team. His father, a civil engineer, brought home out-of-date Letraset sheets from work, providing Purcell with his earliest graphic design materials. He received a subscription to the comic 2000 AD at age eleven, which became a significant early influence.

Purcell studied graphic design at Central Saint Martins in London, enrolling around 1990 after a foundation course. During his foundation course, he became interested in computers and would use the college labs for drawing. When Macintosh computers arrived at Central Saint Martins, however, they were oversubscribed; Purcell turned instead to felt-tip pens and photocopiers, a limitation that influenced his graphic style. At the college, he was largely self-directed, spending time in the library rather than attending tutorials. He graduated in 1993.

== Artistic career ==
=== As graphic designer ===
While still at school, c. 1987, Purcell sent a letter covered in drawings with a mail-order request to Slam City Skates, a London skate shop then based in the basement of Rough Trade Records in Notting Hill. The shop invited him to create T-shirt artwork, and his first commission was an advertisement that ran in Viz comic for both Slam City and Rough Trade. He was paid with a hoodie rather than money. The shop became a central point of connection between skateboarding and independent music for Purcell.

Through Slam City, he met Sofia Prantera, who was developing an in-house clothing label called Holmes, for which Purcell became the graphic designer. In the mid-to-late 1990s, Prantera and Russell Waterman founded Silas (later Silas & Maria), a streetwear label that gained a dedicated following, particularly in Japan, where it operated three retail stores. Purcell designed graphics for Silas alongside illustrators James Jarvis and Ben Sansbury. During this period, he also designed for Japanese brands including Hysteric Glamour, X-Girl Japan, and Good Enough.

Purcell designed the "Tri-Ferg" logo for Palace Skateboards. He met Palace founder Lev Tanju through the Slam City Skates scene, and when Tanju founded the brand in 2009, he asked Purcell to handle the graphics. Tanju's initial brief specified that the brand would be centred on triangles. Purcell designed a Penrose triangle — a mathematically impossible optical illusion — with "PALACE" inscribed on each of the three faces. He has said the form's implied three-dimensionality gives it "a quality of being epic" even at small sizes, and that he chose it for its connotations of infinity and constant movement. The nickname "Tri-Ferg," a portmanteau of "triangle" and "Fergus," was coined by the Palace team and became the logo's common name. The design has remained unchanged since 2009. Although Purcell does not skateboard himself, he continues to produce seasonal graphics and deck designs for Palace.

=== As clothing label owner ===
Purcell launched his own T-shirt line, Tonite, which he described as a vehicle for his personal obsessions. Tonite collaborated with Paul Smith's Japanese line on a capsule called "Robinstein Frankencrusoe" and was stocked at Slam City Skates and independent retailers.

In 2009, Purcell and Sofia Prantera co-founded Aries, a London-based streetwear label. Prantera has said the two "both wanted the same T-shirts," and the label was conceived without rigid gender divisions. Purcell has described Aries as "a collision between trashy and high-end." He chose the name based on his star sign and created the brand's visual identity, including its Roman temple logo and recurring rat motif. In 2017, Purcell and Prantera were named to Hypebeast's HB100 list of the year's most influential figures. Aries collaborations have included a 2019 collection with Turner Prize-winning artist Jeremy Deller, featuring Neolithic-inspired graphics and the slogan "Make Archaeology Sexy Again," which was exhibited at The Store X in London. A retrospective book, Aries Arise Archive, was published by Rizzoli in 2025, with a foreword by fashion critic Angelo Flaccavento and design by Jonny Lu.

=== As fashion industry designer ===
Purcell's crossover into high fashion began in 2013, when designer Luella Bartley, then design director at Marc by Marc Jacobs alongside creative director Katie Hillier, invited him to create the visual identity for the label's Autumn/Winter 2014 relaunch collection. Initially hired for a small number of graphics, his contribution expanded across the entire collection, which featured motocross, BMX, and skateboarding themes; Purcell created the motocross-inspired typography used across the collection. He subsequently contributed textiles to the mainline Marc Jacobs label.

For McQ, the diffusion line of Alexander McQueen, Purcell created three principal graphic designs for the Spring/Summer 2015 collection, a project that arose from the label's series of collaborations with London tattoo artists. Other fashion clients have included Burberry, Calvin Klein, Gucci, Stella McCartney, Junya Watanabe, and Vivienne Westwood.

In 2022, Tommy Hilfiger commissioned Purcell to redesign the brand's monogram. He researched the company's archive and created a new interlocking "TH" motif, which debuted in the Fall 2022 collection shown at New York Fashion Week. Purcell described the aim as making "something that was new and iconic but also felt as though it could have existed already."

Other notable projects include a Calvin Klein and Highsnobiety capsule celebrating the brand's 50th anniversary, a Uniqlo UT collection released in 2021, a Vans Vault "Corner Shop" sneaker range themed around the signage and packaging of British corner shops, a Volcom and Fergadelic collaboration, and a series of photograph T-shirts produced with independent publisher IDEA.

== Musical career ==
Purcell's involvement in music extends beyond graphic design and into direct musical performances. He is credited as a human beatbox performer on the Beta Band's 1999 self-titled debut album. Purcell was a member of Die Verboten, a Krautrock and space rock group formed with David and Stephen Dewaele of Soulwax/2ManyDJs and Henry "Riton" Smithson. The band's debut 12-inch, Live in Eivissa (2009), was released on The Vinyl Factory in a limited edition with a folding cardboard pyramid sleeve; it was recorded in an improvised studio in Ibiza using unconventional sound sources including water-filled bottles and submerged cymbals. A full-length album, 2007, originally recorded in 2007 but left unreleased, was mixed and issued on the DEEWEE label in 2015. Purcell played drums, contributed to composition, and served as art director.

Other musical projects include 5 Mic Cluster, a post-acid house project with techno producer Mark Broom, and participation in Chrome Hoof, a multi-genre collective.

Purcell has designed artwork and visuals for a range of musicians and labels. He created the butterfly logo for the Avalanches' 2016 album Wildflower, produced live visuals for 2ManyDJs, and designed artwork for Rise Above Records, the label founded by Lee Dorrian of Cathedral and Napalm Death. Other music-industry clients include Atlantic Records, Domino Recording Company, EMI, and Daft Punk.

== Style and influences ==
Purcell's visual language draws on American hardcore punk, psychedelic rock, pre-digital technical illustration, and underground comix. His techniques include pen-and-ink drawing, hard-edged vector graphics, airbrushing, collage, marker illustration, Letraset, Letratone, and Rotring pen technical drawing, often combined with digital tools. He has cited the graphic design of skateboard decks, the illustrations of Jack Kirby and Moebius, the underground comix of Robert Crumb and Gilbert Shelton, and the aesthetic of Fiorucci, Watchmen, and "trashy video covers" as formative influences.

He has described his approach to applied art as preferable to fine art, stating that he never felt restricted by working on T-shirts, record covers, or skateboards. He told The Guardian in 2014: "I don't try to be obscure. I just like the work to be out there, shouting and being exciting." Purcell is also a practitioner of stick-and-poke tattooing, which he took up in his late twenties after being mentored by Xed LeHead at the Into You tattoo parlour in London.

== Publications ==
- Gas Book #17 (2004), with The Changes (SK8thing and Perks and Mini)
- The Vorpal Blade (2006), a zine published by Nieves; later released digitally on Apple Books
- Home Made Tattoos Rule (2006), cover subject of a photobook documenting DIY tattoo culture
- TTT: Tattoo by TTTism and Nicholas Schonberger, in which Purcell's work is featured
- Italiens / The Changes in Italia (c. 2008), exhibition catalogue with SK8thing and Perks and Mini, published by Printed Matter
- Molly (c. 2016), zine with photographer Terry Richardson, limited edition of 100, published by IDEA
- Click to Buy (2017), with photographer David Sims, published by IDEA
- Aries Arise Archive (2025), published by Rizzoli
