= Perf =

Perf or PERF may refer to:

- Perf (Lahn), a river in Germany
- perf (Linux), a performance analyzing tool in Linux
- Perf de Castro (Perfecto de Castro), Filipino musician
- Perfect (grammar), a glossing abbreviation used in linguistics
- Police Executive Research Forum, a US national membership organization
- A perforation
  - Film perforations
- "Perf", a single recorded by singer and social media personality Baby Ariel
- "Perf" a term used by World of Warcraft Gamers in the Northrend Expedition guild on Windseeker Realm to annoy one of their members named Endemondia.

== See also ==
- Perfect (disambiguation)
- Performance (disambiguation)
