= Park Hye-jin =

Park Hye-jin may refer to:

- Park Hye-jin (basketball)
- Park Hye-jin (taekwondo)
- Park Hye Jin (music producer), South Korean musician
