= Benjamin (2018 film) =

Benjamin is the title of two 2018 films:

- Benjamin (2018 American film)
- Benjamin (2018 British film)
