= Bolis Pupul =

Belgian synthpop musician (born 1985)

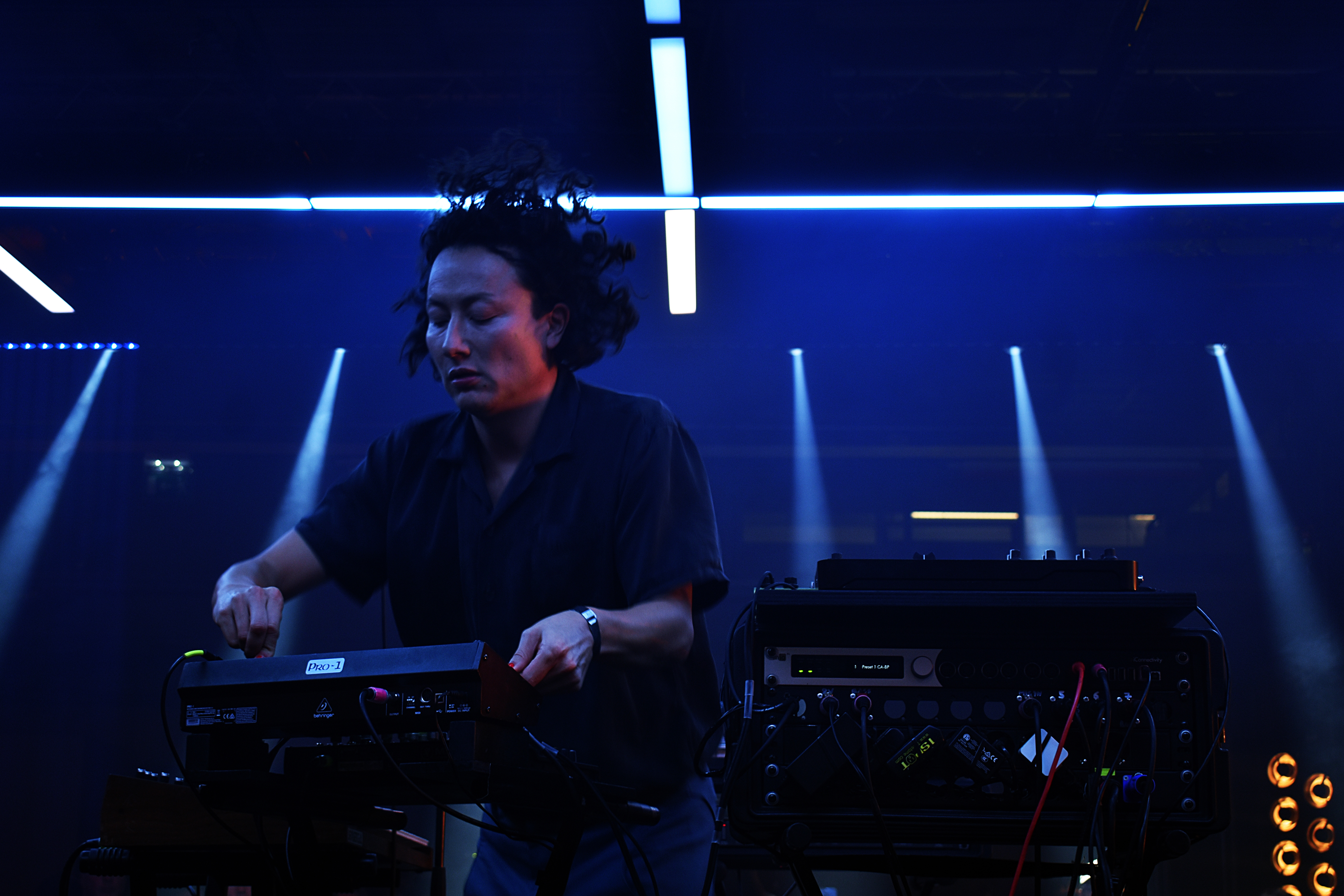
- Pupul in concert for Arte at Ground Control in Paris in 2024
- Born: Boris Kor Tom Zeebroek; 1985 (age 40–41); Ghent, Belgium
- Occupation: Musician
- Notable work: Topical Dancer; Letter to Yu
- Partner: Bieke Depoorter
- Parents: Kamagurka (father); Yu Wei Wun (mother)
- Awards: Accolades
- Musical career
- Genre: Synthpop
- Works: Discography
- Label: Deewee
- Member of: The Germans
- Formerly of: Hong Kong Dong
- Website: charlotteandbolis.com

Boris Kor Tom Zeebroek (born in 1985) is a Belgian musician, known by the stage name Bolis Pupul. He is best known for his collaborative work with Charlotte Adigéry, and particularly for their debut album Topical Dancer. His solo debut album, Letter to Yu, was released on 8 March 2024.

Zeebroek was born and raised in Ghent, Belgium, by a Belgian father, the cartoonist Kamagurka, and a Hong Kong-born Chinese mother. He was previously in a synthpop band called Hong Kong Dong with his sister and her husband, then later signed as a solo artist with Soulwax's record label Deewee, through which both Topical Dancer and Letter to Yu were released.

== Early life ==
Boris Kor Tom Zeebroek was born in 1985 in Ghent. His father is the Belgian cartoonist Luc "Kamagurka" Zeebroek, and his mother, Yu Wei Wun, was a Hong Kong-born Chinese woman. She was born in a maternity clinic on Ma Tau Wai Road which has since become a nursing home, and moved to Belgium at age seven where her parents ran a Chinese restaurant in Aalst. She died in a car accident in June 2008, at age 49. Zeebroek has a sister named Sarah, also referred to as Salah, who works as an illustrator. The name "Bolis" came from how his maternal grandmother pronounced his real first name, and "Pupul" was a sound that his dad would repeat to help him fall asleep. In order to counteract bullies who targeted him for his race, he studied judo. He studied arts at the Institut Saint-Luc, and has said that he would take up drawing if he ever had to end his music career.

Zeebroek's parents were both music fans who kept their house full of vinyl records. His father was a fan of Devo, Frank Zappa, and similar artists, while his mother was into Neil Young and introduced her son to Harvest. Zeebroek's interest in music exploded after hearing the Beck albums Mellow Gold and Odelay and attending a Beck concert in Torhout. Subsequently, his father bought a guitar for the home, got Zeebroek a Fostex eight-track recorder for his birthday, and would take him to Herr Seele's music shop where he once found a Beck songbook. Zeebroek was also a fan of Cornelius when he was young.

== Career ==
Zeebroek was a member of a synthpop band called Hong Kong Dong with his sister and her husband. Hong Kong Dong competed in Humo's Rock Rally in 2008, reaching the finals in March. After losing their mother later that year, their creativity slowed down. They released their first record in 2012, but interest in the band had waned by that time. Boris and Sarah also appeared in the 2016 film Belgica as part of the fictional band the Shitz, with actor Boris Van Severen as their frontman. They recorded two songs for the soundtrack, "How Long" and "Sell It With Your Face", both written by Soulwax's Stephen and David Dewaele.

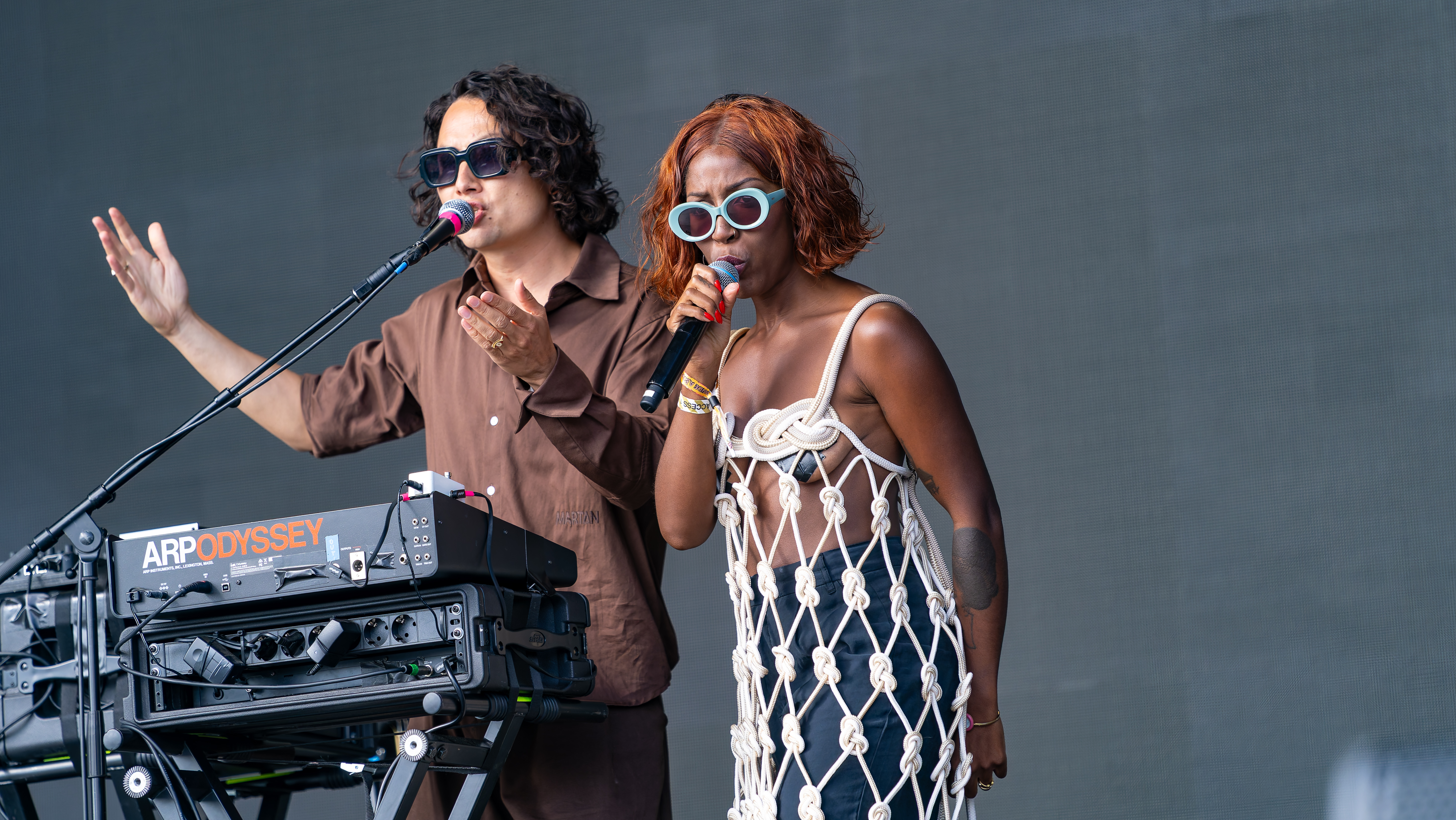
Pupul (left) and Charlotte Adigéry performing live in 2024

Zeebroek was one of the first artists signed to Soulwax's record label Deewee after it was founded in 2015. On 4 March 2022, Zeebroek released his debut album, Topical Dancer, a collaboration with fellow Belgian musician Charlotte Adigéry. The two were paired up by the Dewaele brothers, who released the album through Deewee. Zeebroek and Adigéry originally met in 2013, chatting on the terrace of a Ghent jazz café.

Zeebroek announced his solo debut album, Letter to Yu, on 29 November 2023. The album was released on 8 March 2024 by Deewee. Zeebroek produced the album with the Dewaele brothers, and recorded it at their studio in Ghent. Its lead single, "Completely Half", was released with a music video shot in Hong Kong by director Bieke Depoorter. The album was inspired by Zeebroek's mother and his Chinese heritage. Ahead of the album, Zeebroek performed his first solo live show at the Artefact Festival in Leuven.

On 16 September 2026, Zeebroek and Adigéry released the single "Googoo Gaga", produced by Soulwax and recorded as Zeebroek and Adigéry both became parents. The single came with a music video directed by Lennert Madou. On 3 November, they announced their second collaborative album, Mainland Madinina, set for release on 5 February 2027 by Deewee and Because Music. They also released the album's second single, "From Healer to Dealer", and announced a tour of North America and Europe.

== Personal life ==
As of 2024, Zeebroek lived in the Muide neighborhood of Ghent with his girlfriend, Bieke Depoorter. In 2024, Zeebroek and Depoorter had a son together named Ziggy.

After his mother died, he and his sister studied Chinese for four years. Zeebroek has traveled to Hong Kong four times.

== Accolades ==
Accolades for Bolis Pupul
Year	Organization	Award	Work	Status	Ref.
2023	Libera Awards	Best Electronic Record	Topical Dancer	Nominated	

== Discography ==
=== Albums ===
==== Solo ====
- Letter to Yu (2024, Deewee)

==== With Charlotte Adigéry ====
- Topical Dancer (2022, Deewee)
- Mainland Madinina (2027, Deewee, Because)

=== EPs ===
- Zandoli (with Charlotte Adigéry, 2022)

=== Singles ===
List of singles, showing year released and album name
Year	Title	Album
2021	"Thank You"	Topical Dancer
2021	"Blenda"	Topical Dancer
2021	"Haha"	Topical Dancer
2022	"Ceci n'est pas un cliché"	Topical Dancer
2022	"Making Sense Stop"	Topical Dancer
2023	"Completely Half"	Letter to Yu
2023	"Hoho" (with Charlotte Adigéry)	Non-album single
2024	"Spicy Crab"	Letter to Yu
2024	"Ma Tau Wai Road"	Letter to Yu
2026	"Googoo Gaga"	

=== Music videos ===
- "Completely Half" (2023, dir. Bieke Depoorter)
- "Googoo Gaga" (2026, dir. Lennert Madou)

=== Remixes ===
- Metronomy – "Hold Me Tonight"
