= Tides: Music for Meditation and Yoga =

Tides
- 2019 edition cover

Studio album by Kaitlyn Aurelia Smith
- Released: November 11, 2014; January 11, 2019 (reissue)
- Recorded: 2013
- Length: 42:32
- Label: Touchtheplants (reissue)
- Producer: Kaitlyn Aurelia Smith

Kaitlyn Aurelia Smith chronology
Tides (2014)	Euclid (2015)

Tides is a studio album by American musician Kaitlyn Aurelia Smith. It was initially released in 2014 and later re-released on January 11, 2019, as Tides: Music for Meditation and Yoga through the label Touchtheplants.

== Background and recording ==
Smith recorded the album in 2013 using a Buchla Music Easel synthesizer after her mother, a yoga teacher, wanted music she could play during her classes. It includes field recordings of "wind chimes, forest sounds, birds chirping, [and] steam valves". The album is the first release on Smith's new label, Touchtheplants.

== Critical reception ==
Professional ratings
Review scores
Source	Rating
AllMusic	3.5/5 stars
Exclaim!	8/10
Pitchfork	7.0/10
Resident Advisor	3.6/5

Paul Simpson of AllMusic stated, "While not as ornate as her subsequent works, Tides spotlights Smith's talent for building moods." Daniel Martin-McCormick of Pitchfork wrote, "when you put it on and forget about it, it can transform a room." He added, "In this sense, Tides succeeds as ambient music in its purest form." Matthew Clark of Exclaim! commented that "listening to Tides is like sitting on the beach for a day and letting the surf wash over you; the water rises and falls and you are there with it, present in all its glory and bliss." Fact said the album provides an "insight into an early phase of the composer[']s music".

== Track listing ==
All tracks are written by Kaitlyn Aurelia Smith.

Tides (2014) track listing
No.	Title	Length
1.	"Tides I"	14:56
2.	"Tides II"	4:49
3.	"Tides III"	3:30
4.	"Tides IV"	2:06
5.	"Tides V"	7:11
6.	"Tides VI"	6:44
7.	"Tides VII"	2:33
8.	"Tides VIII"	9:12
9.	"Tides IX"	3:25
10.	"Tides X"	6:21

Tides: Music for Meditation and Yoga (2019) track listing
No.	Title	Length
1.	"Tides I"	5:08
2.	"Tides II"	6:56
3.	"Tides III"	3:24
4.	"Tides IV"	6:44
5.	"Tides V"	6:36
6.	"Tides VI"	2:00
7.	"Tides VII"	3:20
8.	"Tides VIII"	2:31
9.	"Tides IX"	5:52
Total length:		42:32

== Personnel ==
Credits adapted from liner notes.

- Kaitlyn Aurelia Smith – recording, mixing, mastering
- Sean Hellfritsch – cover art rendering
- George Hart – cover art model
