= Ears (album) =

Studio album by Kaitlyn Aurelia Smith
- Released: April 1, 2016
- Genres: Electronic; new-age; ambient pop
- Length: 38:45
- Label: Western Vinyl
- Producer: Kaitlyn Aurelia Smith

Kaitlyn Aurelia Smith chronology
Euclid (2015)	Ears (2016)	The Kid (2017)

Ears (typeset as EARS) is a 2016 album by American composer Kaitlyn Aurelia Smith, released on the independent label Western Vinyl. The album pairs Smith's use of analog synthesizer with organic instrumentation and vocals. It received acclaim from music critics, and was included on year-end lists by Pitchfork, NPR Music, and Resident Advisor.

== Recording ==
In addition to Smith's Buchla analog synthesizers, the music on Ears features her vocals, a woodwind quintet, mbira, and field recordings. It is the first of her recordings to blend synthesizer with traditional instrumentation.

Smith was influenced by visuals, including the works of Moebius and Hayao Miyazaki (specifically the 1984 film Nausicaä of the Valley of the Wind), which she claims "inspired environments that I wanted to create with sound."

She added that "I was trying to figure out the visual of this natural world I wanted to create [...] And both Moebius and Miyazaki have that natural world where it feels like there's chaos and balance at the same time."

== Reception ==
Professional ratings
Aggregate scores
Source	Rating
Metacritic	82/100
Review scores
Source	Rating
AllMusic	4/5 stars
Clash	8/10
Pitchfork	8.0/10
Uncut	4/5 stars
The Vinyl District	A-

The album received an aggregate score of 82/100 from 9 critics according to Metacritic, indicating "universal acclaim". AllMusic called the album "imaginative and alive", stating that Smith "allows the oscillating electronic tones to ebb and flow like waves, and they have fluid, natural rhythms rather than quantized beat structures." Pitchfork stated that "in her hands, acoustic instruments sound like electronic ones, synthetic sounds reference nature, and human voices sound like the creation of machines," resulting in "a pleasingly alien mood that also feels oddly familiar." Uncut called the album "a modern new-age gem".

=== Accolades ===
Ears featured heavily in 2016 end-of-year lists. It was listed at #29 on Pitchfork's 50 Best Albums of 2016, #14 on Resident Advisor's 20 Best Albums, #30 on NPR Music's Best 50 Albums of 2016, and chosen as Norman Records' Album of the Year 2016.

The track "Existence in the Unfurling" was placed at #70 on Pitchfork's 100 Best Songs of 2016, while Ears was mentioned in Pitchfork's 20 Best Experimental Albums of 2016 (along with Kaitlyn's collaboration with Suzanne Ciani, Sunergy). Crack Magazine also cited Ears and Sunergy at #10 and #94, respectively, on their Top 100 Albums of the Year 2016.

== Tracklist ==
All tracks are written by Kaitlyn Aurelia Smith.

Ears track listing
No.	Title	Length
1.	"First Flight"	4:38
2.	"Wetlands"	3:35
3.	"Envelop"	4:56
4.	"When I Try, I'm Full"	3:56
5.	"Rare Things Grow"	3:45
6.	"Arthropoda"	3:37
7.	"Stratus"	3:04
8.	"Existence in the Unfurling"	11:08
Total length:		38:39

== Personnel ==
- Kaitlyn Aurelia Smith - composition, production, mixing, voice, flute, clarinet, alto saxophone, tenor saxophone, bass clarinet, synthesizer (Buchla Music Easel, EMS Synthi, ARP 2600, Oscar, Korg Mono/Poly, Electrocomp 101, Moog Werkstatt)
- Rob Frye - woodwind
- Simon Heyworth - mastering
- Salihah Moore Kirby - artwork
