= Performance testing =

Performance test or performance testing may refer to:

- Performance test (assessment), an assessment requiring the subject to perform a task or activity
- Performance test (bar exam), a section of the bar exam simulating a real-life legal task
- Software performance testing, a procedure to determine how a system performs under a particular workload
- A type of physical test

== See also ==
- Performance (disambiguation)
