= The Mosaic of Transformation =

Studio album by Kaitlyn Aurelia Smith
- Released: May 15, 2020
- Length: 37:47
- Label: Ghostly International

Kaitlyn Aurelia Smith chronology
The Kid (2017)	The Mosaic of Transformation (2020)	Let's Turn It into Sound (2022)

The Mosaic of Transformation is the eighth studio album by American singer-songwriter Kaitlyn Aurelia Smith. It was released on May 15, 2020, under Ghostly International.

== Critical reception ==
Professional ratings
Aggregate scores
Source	Rating
Metacritic	76/100
Review scores
Source	Rating
AllMusic	3.5/5 stars
Beats Per Minute	71%
Clash	8/10
Crack	5/10
Exclaim!	8/10
Loud and Quiet	8/10
Pitchfork	7.2/10

According to the review aggregator Metacritic, The Mosaic of Transformation received "generally favorable reviews" based on a weighted average score of 76 out of 100 from 8 critic scores.

Paul Simpson of AllMusic described the album as "an ever-shifting, multi-sensory mass of bubbling synths and cascading vocal arrangements." Kaelen Bell of Exclaim! stated, "Voice, organ, wood blocks, string pads, vibraphone and sounds liquid and untraceable shift endlessly, a world of form that buzzes in your fingertips."

=== Accolades ===
Year-end lists for The Mosaic of Transformation
Publication	List	Rank	Ref.
Clash	Clash Albums of the Year 2020	46	

== Track listing ==
The Mosaic of Transformation track listing
No.	Title	Length
1.	"Unbraiding Boundless Energy Within Boundaries"	1:07
2.	"Remembering"	5:52
3.	"Understanding Body Messages"	1:24
4.	"The Steady Heart"	5:39
5.	"Carrying Gravity"	7:03
6.	"The Spine Is Quiet in the Center"	5:11
7.	"Overflowing"	0:28
8.	"Deepening the Flow Of"	0:27
9.	"Expanding Electricity"	10:36
Total length:		37:47

Japanese edition bonus tracks
No.	Title	Length
10.	"The Steady Heart" (single edit)	4:32
11.	"Expanding Electricity" (single edit)	5:33
Total length:		47:10

== Charts ==
Chart performance for The Mosaic of Transformation
Chart (2020)	Peak position
UK Album Downloads (Official Charts)	64
