= James Righton =

English musician (born 1983)

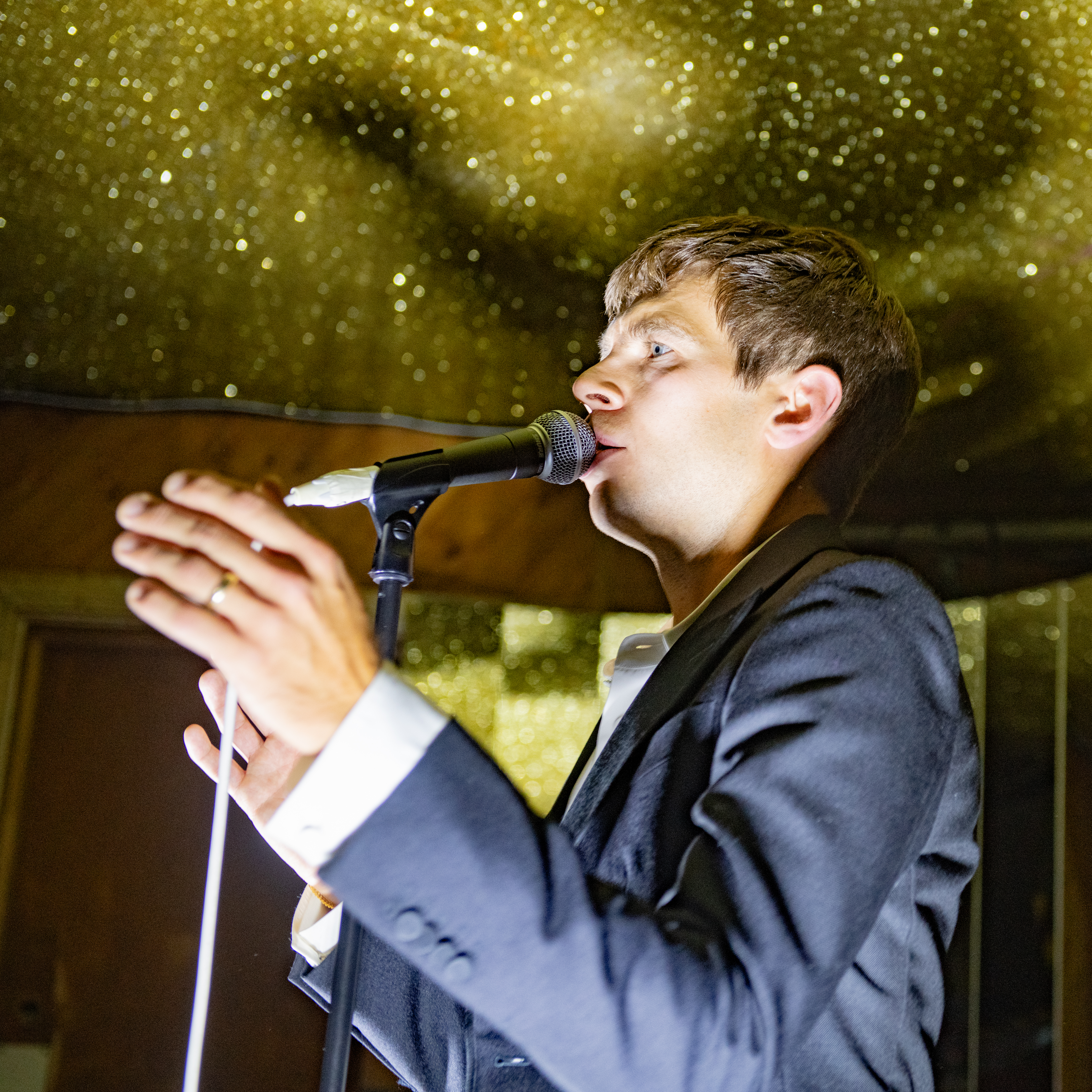
- Righton performing in 2022

Background information
- Born: James Nicholas Righton; 25 August 1983 (age 43); Stratford-upon-Avon, Warwickshire, England
- Genres: Indie rock; post-punk revival; new rave; neo-psychedelia
- Occupations: Musician; singer
- Instruments: Vocals; keyboards; guitar
- Years active: 2005–present
- Labels: Marathon Artists; House Anxiety; Polydor; Geffen; Deewee
- Formerly of: Klaxons; Shock Machine
- Spouse: Keira Knightley (m. 2013)

James Nicholas Righton (born 25 August 1983) is an English musician and composer for film and television. He was the keyboard-player and co-lead vocalist of the London-based new rave band Klaxons, which disbanded in 2015. In March 2016, Righton announced his new project Shock Machine with a video directed by Saam Farahmand. Righton released his debut solo album The Performer on Soulwax's Deewee label in March 2020.

== Early life ==
Righton was born in Leamington Spa. Righton's father, also a musician, encouraged him to be a part of several bands that performed regularly while he was still at Stratford-upon-Avon High School.

== Career ==
While attending the High School at Stratford-upon-Avon, Righton met Simon Taylor-Davis and taught him to play the guitar. While working towards a career as a performer, Righton worked as a music teacher. He attended the Benicàssim festival, where he again met Simon Taylor-Davis, and soon after that the two met Jamie Reynolds in New Cross, London. When Reynolds lost his job, he bought a studio kit with his redundancy money. The three men began to record and perform live under the name of "Klaxons (Not Centaurs)", a name inspired by Filippo Tommaso Marinetti's The Futurist Manifesto. In 2005 this band played with Finnigan Kidd as drummer, until Kidd left and Steffan Halperin joined in 2006, Around this time, the band began using the shorter name of "Klaxons".

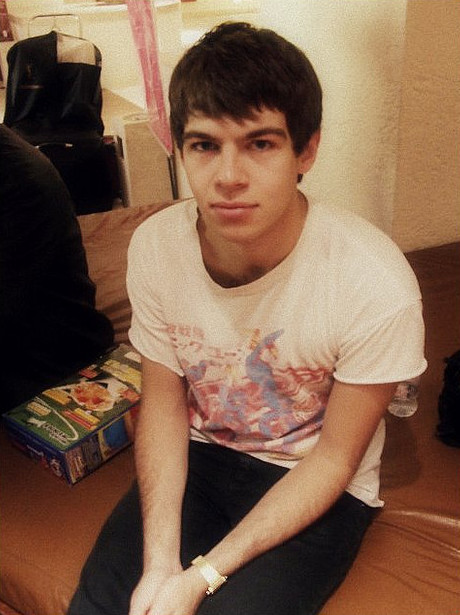
Righton in 2007

Klaxons signed to Polydor Records in 2006. After many successful tours, they announced in 2014 that their current tour would be their last.

James Righton signed to Marathon Artists/House Anxiety in 2016 under the moniker, Shock Machine. Righton's new project was announced in March with the release of the video for the first single, Shock Machine, directed by Saam Farahmand. The eponymous introduction to this project was recorded in a cabin in the south of France with producer James Ford. The first single Shock Machine, released on 8 March 2016 with accompanying video directed by Saam Farahmand, was featured on his four-track debut EP Open Up The Sky. After the release of the EP, Righton released the single Lost in the Mystery. Remixes of Open Up the Sky and Shock Machine by Soulwax, and Beyond the Wizards Sleeve were also released. Shock Machine's debut album was released on 25 August 2017.

=== Work in film and theatre ===
Righton scored the short film William by Simon Amstell in 2015. He went on to score Amstell's film Benjamin in 2018 and compose music for Amstell's 2019 Netflix stand up special "Set Free". He worked alongside Tom Rowlands for The Life of Galileo, directed by Joe Wright at the Young Vic in 2017. In 2021 it was announced that James would be working with ABBA on their ABBA Voyage concert shows in London.

== Personal life ==
In February 2011, Righton began dating actress Keira Knightley and on 4 May 2013 they were married in Mazan, Vaucluse, in the south of France. Since early 2014 they have lived in Canonbury, Islington. They have two daughters, born in May 2015 and September 2019.

== Discography ==
=== Solo ===
- The Performer (2020)
- Jim, I'm Still Here (2022)

=== With Klaxons ===
- Myths of the Near Future (2007)
- Surfing the Void (2010)
- Love Frequency (2014)

=== As Shock Machine ===
- Shock Machine (2017)

=== Soundtracks ===
- Benjamin (2018)
- I'll Be Right There (2023)
- Daddy Issues (2024–2025)
- Hostages (2025)
- Just Sing (2025)
- Untold: The Liver King (2025)
- Adultery (ITV) (2026)

=== Additional musical credits ===
- Righton co-wrote "All Rights Reversed", from 2007's Grammy Award-winning album We Are the Night by The Chemical Brothers, and provided vocals alongside his Klaxons bandmates and Dev Hynes
- He co-wrote "Deeper" (w/ MNEK) (featuring House Gospel Choir) by Riton
- He contributed guitar, piano, and wurlitzer to Arctic Monkeys Tranquility Base Hotel & Casino
- James co-wrote the lead single "The Third Degree" from Honeyblood's 2019 album In Plain Sight
- In 2020, James co-wrote "This Moment Forever" from Hinds' third album The Prettiest Curse
- He played synths on "Don't Tell Me to Smile" by Soko
