= Deewee =

Record label

DEEWEE
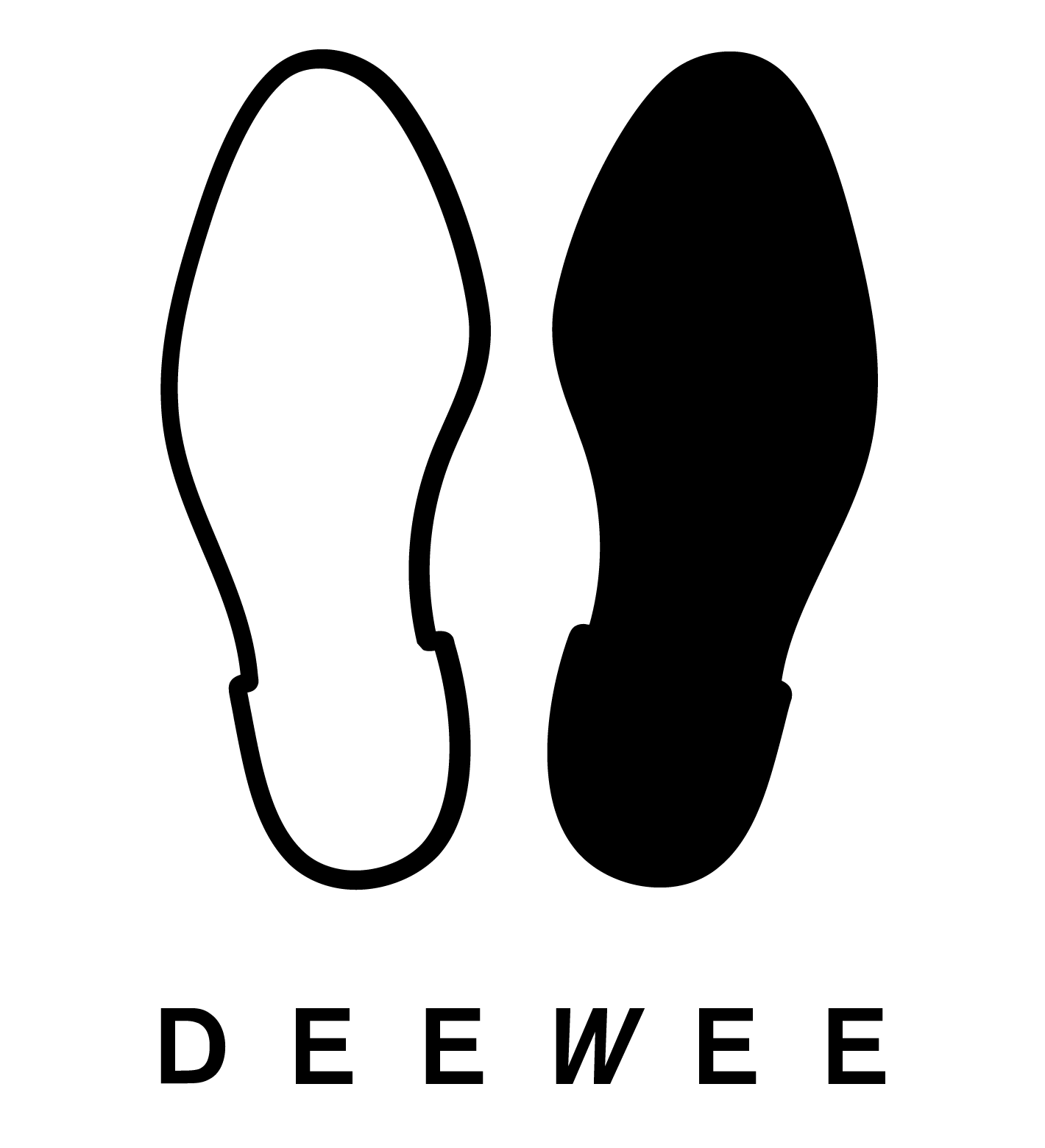
- The official logo for DEEWEE
- Founded: 2015; 11 years ago
- Founder: David and Stephen Dewaele
- Distributor: Because Music
- Genre: Techno; House; Electronica; Synth-pop
- Country of origin: Belgium
- Location: Ghent
- Official website: https://deew.ee/

Deewee, stylized as DEEWEE is a record label founded in 2015 by David and Stephen Dewaele of the band Soulwax. The label operates from a building in Ghent (Belgium) that the Dewaele brothers nickname DEEWEE 001, referring to it as the first item on the label's catalog. The building was designed for the Dewaeles by Belgian architect Glenn Sestig. It houses the recording studio where all releases on the label are written, recorded or mixed.

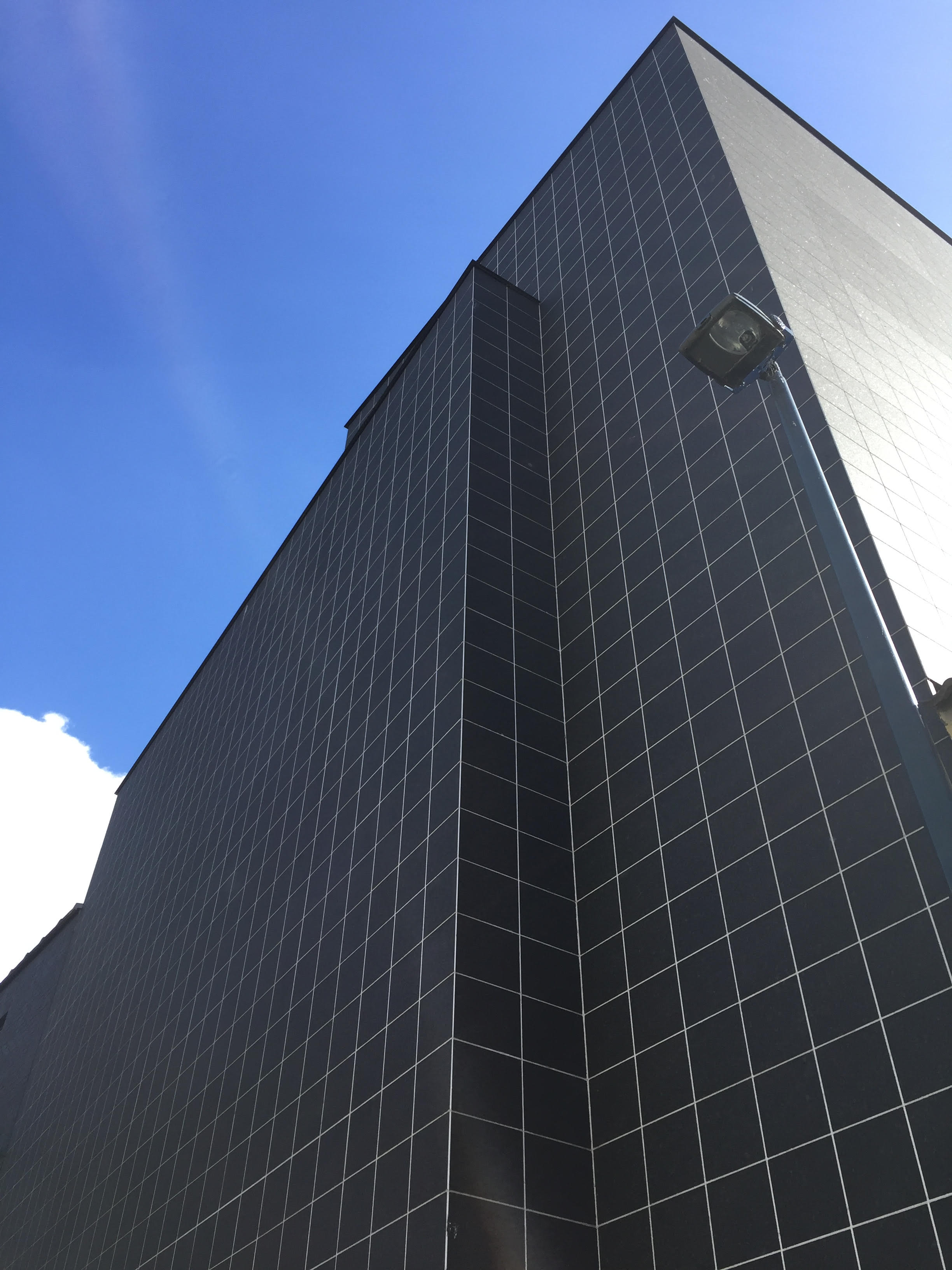
DEEWEE 001, the building that houses the DEEWEE recording studio and is seen as the first item on the label's catalog.

The Dewaele brothers conceived their label in reaction to the trend of electronic music artists collaborating remotely via file transfer and rarely meeting to work together in the same location. The label initially released music by new young artists, until 2017 when Soulwax started releasing their own music on it as well. Their 2017 album "From DEEWEE" was based on the 'Transient Program For Drums and Machinery' live tour and was recorded live in one take. It won the album of the year award at the 2017 edition of the Music Industry Awards. The duo continued experimenting on the label, featuring an album made entirely with sounds from the legendary EMS Synthi 100 synthesizer and an online TV channel, named DEEWEE TEEVEE.

== Artists ==
- Asa Moto
- Bolis Pupul
- Charlotte Adigéry
- Die Verboten
- Each Other (Max Pask & Justin Strauss)
- Extra Credit (Marcus Marr, Joe Goddard & Justin Strauss)
- EMS Synthi 100 (David and Stephen Dewaele)
- Future Sound of Antwerp
- James Righton
- Klanken (David and Stephen Dewaele)
- Laila Sakini
- Laima Leyton
- Marie Davidson
- Movulango
- Natasha Pirard
- Philippi & Rodrigo
- Philippi
- Soulwax
- Stephen & David Dewaele
- Sworn Virgins

== Discography ==
=== Albums ===
- DEEWEE 003: Die Verboten - 2007 (2015)
- DEEWEE 022: Soulwax - From Deewee (2017)
- DEEWEE 027: Soulwax - Essential (2018)
- DEEWEE 031: Laima - Home (2019)
- DEEWEE 032: Phillipi & Rodrigo - Paciencia (2019)
- DEEWEE 034: EMS Synthi 100 - DEEWEE Sessions Vol.01 (2020)
- DEEWEE 036: James Righton - The Performer (2020)
- DEEWEE 055: Charlotte Adigéry & Bolis Pupul - Topical Dancer (2022)
- DEEWEE 057: Natasha Pirard - Dream Cycles (2024)
- DEEWEE 062: James Righton - Jim, I'm Still Here (2023)
- DEEWEE 064: Stephen & David Dewaele - Original Music For 'Lullaby For Scavengers' By Kim Noble (2023)
- DEEWEE 066: Asa Moto - Original Music For Benjamin Verdonck & Lucas van Haesbroeck's 'Down The Rabbit Hole' (2023)
- DEEWEE 074: Bolis Pupul - Letter to Yu (2024)
- DEEWEE 080: Marie Davidson - City of Clowns (2025)

=== Singles/EPs ===
- DEEWEE 002: Klanken - "Drie / Twee" (2015)
- DEEWEE 004: Emmanuelle - "Free Hifi Internet" (2015)
- DEEWEE 010: Philiipi & Rodrigo - "Karma / Gueto De Gent" (2016)
- DEEWEE 011: Asa Moto - "Stay Awake / Wanowan Efem" (2016)
- DEEWEE 012: Laila - "The Other Me" (2016)
- DEEWEE 014: Bolis Pupul - "Moon Theme / Sun Theme" (2016)
- DEEWEE 015: Emmanuelle - "L'Uomo D'Affari / Italove" (2016)
- DEEWEE 016: Soulwax feat. Chloë Sevigny - "Heaven Scent" (2016)
- DEEWEE 017: Phillipi & Rodrigo - "Mantra / New Beach" (2016)
- DEEWEE 018: Future Sound Of Antwerp - "Tom Cruise, Scientologist" EP (2016)
- DEEWEE 019: Soulwax - "Transient Program For Drums And Machinery" (2016)
- DEEWEE 020: Bolis Pupul - "Wèi / Teknow" (2017)
- DEEWEE 021: Charlotte Adigéry - "Charlotte Adigéry" EP (2017)
- DEEWEE 023: Asa Moto - "Asa Moto" EP (2017)
- DEEWEE 024: Klanken - "Vier / Vijf" (2017)
- DEEWEE 025: Soulwax - "Close To Paradise" (2017)
- DEEWEE 026: Soulwax - "Is It Always Binary (DEEWEEDUB)" (2017)
- DEEWEE 028: Sworn Virgins - "Fifty Dollar Bills" (2018)
- DEEWEE 029: Charlotte Adigéry - "Zandoli" EP (2019)
- DEEWEE 030: Asa Moto - "Playtime" EP (2018)
- DEEWEE 033: Phillipi & Rodrigo - "Paciencia (Single)" (2018)
- DEEWEE 035: Sworn Virgins - "Lazer Beam" (2019)
- DEEWEE 037: Laima - "Disco Pregnancy" (2020)
- DEEWEE 039: Phillipi - "Amadurecimento" EP (2019)
- DEEWEE 040: Each Other - "Be Nice To Each Other" EP (2020)
- DEEWEE 042: Asa Moto - "Martino" EP (2021)
- DEEWEE 043: Extra Credit - "It's Over" (2021)
- DEEWEE 044: Soulwax - "Empty Dancefloor" (2020)
- DEEWEE 045: Charlotte Adigéry - "Bear With Me (And I'll Stand Bare Before You)" (2021)
- DEEWEE 046: Movulango - "Leave" (2021)
- DEEWEE 047: James Righton – "Release Party" (2021)
- DEEWEE 048: Charlotte Adigéry & Bolis Pupul – "Thank You" (2021)
- DEEWEE 049: Charlotte Adigéry & Bolis Pupul – "Blenda" (2021)
- DEEWEE 051: Sworn Virgins - "Strangers Hands" EP (2022)
- DEEWEE 052: Bolis Pupul – "Neon Buddha" (2022)
- DEEWEE 053: Charlotte Adigéry & Bolis Pupul – "Haha" (2022)
- DEEWEE 054: Charlotte Adigéry & Bolis Pupul – "Ceci N'Est Pas Un Cliché" (2022)
- DEEWEE 056: Charlotte Adigéry & Bolis Pupul – "Cliché (Soulwax Remix)" (2022)
- DEEWEE 058: DEEWEE - "Oh Stéphanie" (2022)
- DEEWEE 059: James Righton – "Pause" (2022)
- DEEWEE 060: James Righton – "Empty Rooms" (2022)
- DEEWEE 061: James Righton – "Never Give Up On The City" (2022)
- DEEWEE 062: James Righton – "Lover Boy" (2022)
- DEEWEE 063: James Righton – "Lover Boy" (2022)
- DEEWEE 065: Movulango – "Mirror In Man" EP (2022)
- DEEWEE 067: Phillipi – "Terra Gira" EP (2023)
- DEEWEE 068: Movulango – "The Irony" EP (2023)
- DEEWEE 069: Bolis Pupul - "Completely Half" (2023)
- DEEWEE 070: Bolis Pupul - "Spicy Crab" (2023)
- DEEWEE 071: Bolis Pupul with Salah Pupul - "Ma Tau Wai Road" (2023)
- DEEWEE 072: Bolis Pupul - "Kowloon" (2023)
- DEEWEE 073: Charlotte Adigéry & Bolis Pupul – "Hoho" (2023)
- DEEWEE 075: Marie Davidson - "Y.A.A.M." (2024)
- DEEWEE 076: Marie Davidson - "Contrarian" (2024)
- DEEWEE 077: Marie Davidson - "Sexy Clown" (2024)
- DEEWEE 078: Marie Davidson - "Demolition" (2024)
- DEEWEE 079: Marie Davidson - "Fun Times" (2024)

=== Compilations ===
- DEEWEE 050: Foundations (2021)

=== Other formats ===
- DEEWEE 005: "Untold Eivissa" (2015) - Interviews of Ibiza club promoter Faruk Gandji.
- DEEWEE 006: "Untold Eivissa" (2015) - Black T-shirt
- DEEWEE 007: "Untold Eivissa" (2015) - White T-shirt
- DEEWEE 008: "Untold Eivissa" (2015) - Black Totebag
- DEEWEE 009: "Untold Eivissa" (2015) - White Totebag
- DEEWEE 038: Charlotte Adigéry - "Yin-Yang Self-Meditation"— Meditation tape.
- DEEWEE 041: Incomplete Inventory, a 320-page photo book of analog and digital machines from the DEEWEE collection
