= Palace Skateboards =

British skateboard brand & shop

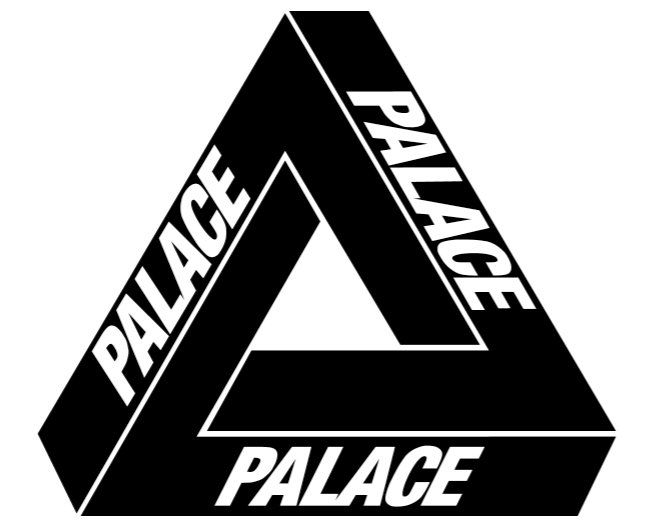
- Founded: 2009 in London, England
- Founder: Levent Tanju
- Number of locations: 6: London; New York City; Tokyo; Los Angeles; Seoul; Hong Kong
- Products: Clothing, shoes, accessories, skateboards
- Total equity: US$13 million (2018)
- Website: palaceskateboards.com

Palace Skateboards (or simply Palace) is a London-based skateboard brand established in 2009. The brand was founded by Lev Tanju, Gareth Skewis and Marshall Taylor. Palace Skateboards is heavily influenced by 90s pop culture. Palace has flagship stores in London, New York City, Los Angeles, Tokyo, Seoul and Hong Kong.

== History ==
In an interview with Glasschord Magazine, founder Lev Tanju mentioned that in the decade after he finished college, he spent a large amount of time skating. He began to design board graphics and subsequently decided to start a skate company, he added. Tanju started by designing T-shirt graphics. "I had a decade gap after college, just skating and doing fun shit.

The brand name "Palace" was inspired by the residences of its founders. Ironically, these were often referred to as "palaces" despite their dilapidated conditions. The brand's triangular-themed logo, known as the "Tri-Ferg logo," was designed by Fergus "Fergadelic" Purcell, Marc Jacobs' design director. Purcell's design, a Penrose triangle with 'Palace' inscribed on each side, aimed to convey a sense of continuous movement.

The three original Palace team riders were Lucien Clarke, Olly Todd, and Charlie Young. This can be seen in the Palace Promo. These team riders were joined later by Danny Brady, Chewy Cannon, Karim Bakhtaoui, Blondey McCoy and Rory Milanes. In 2017 Palace released its first full-length video, Palasonic.

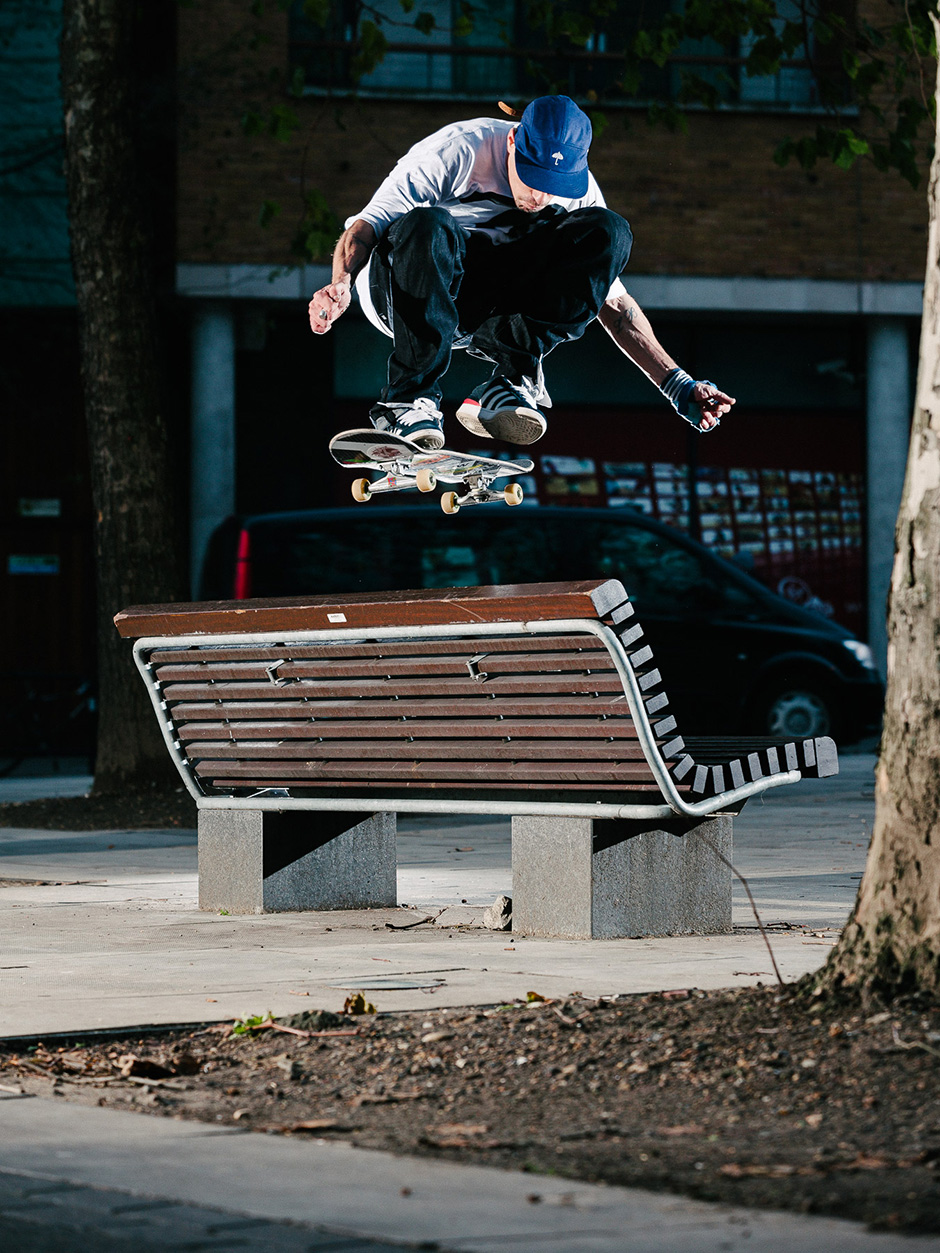

Initially, Palace merchandise was available in local skate shops and boutiques in London. By 2012, the brand expanded its presence to Supreme stores in New York and Los Angeles and was recognized as 'European Skate Brand of the Year' in Berlin for its growth and professionalism.

Subsequent years saw collaborations with brands like Umbro (2012), Reebok (2013), and Adidas (2014). Palace relied on outlets like Dover Street Market and End Clothing, along with pop-up shops in England, for distribution. The brand opened its first store in London in 2015.

== Work and collaborations ==
Palace regularly collaborates with Adidas to produce clothing and footwear. These collections usually consist of casual wear, however, Adidas sometimes incorporates their sport-specific divisions into the collaborations. This includes collections for tennis (worn by Adidas-sponsored players at Wimbledon 2018) and golf. While Adidas was the kit manufacturer for Juventus FC, a fourth kit was released for the club, featuring Palace branding. The kit was worn by Cristiano Ronaldo and Paulo Dybala during matches. Palace has also collaborated multiple times with Reebok, an Adidas subsidiary.

Palace has collaborated with clothing brands such as Avirex, Umbro, Salomon, Dover Street Market, Jean-Charles de Castelbajac, Ralph Lauren, Rapha, Evisu, Moschino and Anarchic Adjustment. However, there have also been collaborations with brands not usually associated with clothing or fashion, which produce co-branded products such as Cîroc Vodka and Winmau darts. However, sometimes clothing collections are made with product or lifestyle brands, as was the case when Palace collaborated with Stella Artois in 2021.

Palace has also released collaborations with singer Elton John, creating a range of apparel, including skateboards. The brand recently released a collaboration with Calvin Klein where a video was released to promote this collaboration entitled 'Palace CK1', and featured famed actor Willem Dafoe.

In October 2025, Palace announced it was collaborating with Nike for the first time.

== Awards ==
- The 2018 Fashion Urban Luxe, category nominated the brand alongside streetwear stalwart Supreme, Off-White, Alyx, and Marine Serre
- The 2012 'European Skate Brand of the Year' at the BRIGHT Tradeshow Award in Berlin.
