= Let's Turn It into Sound =

Studio album by Kaitlyn Aurelia Smith
- Released: August 26, 2022
- Genre: Electronic
- Length: 40:18
- Label: Ghostly International

Kaitlyn Aurelia Smith chronology
The Mosaic of Transformation (2020)	Let's Turn It into Sound (2022)	Gush (2025)

Let's Turn It into Sound is a studio album by American composer Kaitlyn Aurelia Smith. It was released on August 26, 2022, through Ghostly International. It received generally favorable reviews from critics.

== Background ==
Kaitlyn Aurelia Smith is an American composer. Let's Turn It into Sound is her first solo album since The Mosaic of Transformation (2020). Based in Los Angeles, she recorded the album over the course of three months in her home studio. In a statement, she described the album as "a puzzle" and added that "[it] is a symbol of receiving a compound of a ton of feelings from going out into a situation, and the song titles are instructions to breaking apart the feelings and understanding them."

The album was released on August 26, 2022, through Ghostly International.

== Critical reception ==
Professional ratings
Aggregate scores
Source	Rating
Metacritic	79/100
Review scores
Source	Rating
AllMusic	4/5 stars
Exclaim!	7/10
The Guardian	4/5 stars
Loud and Quiet	6/10
Mojo	4/5 stars
MusicOMH	3.5/5 stars
Pitchfork	7.6/10
PopMatters	7/10
The Skinny	4/5 stars
Uncut	7/10

According to the review aggregator Metacritic, Let's Turn It into Sound received "generally favorable reviews" based on a weighted average score of 79 out of 100 from 11 critic scores.

Paul Simpson of AllMusic commented that "Let's Turn It into Sound is a complex, angular construction, yet it's not a demanding, impenetrable work, as Smith invites the listener to join her on a spirited, boundless journey." Daniel Sylvester of Exclaim! wrote, "Although she's still chiefly fashioning music on her 60-year-old Buchla modular synthesizer, Smith has managed to situate her voice front and centre across these 10 glissando numbers." Tony Inglis of The Skinny called the album "Kinetic and unpredictable," adding that "this idea-packed collection provides an evolution from the ambient, new age music Smith has become known for."

It was nominated for Best Electronic Record at the 2023 Libera Awards.

=== Accolades ===
Year-end lists for Let's Turn It into Sound
Publication	List	Rank	Ref.
AllMusic	Favorite Electronic Albums	—	
PopMatters	The Best Electronic Albums of 2022	—	

== Track listing ==
All tracks are written by Kaitlyn Aurelia Smith.

Let's Turn It into Sound track listing
No.	Title	Length
1.	"Have You Felt Lately?"	3:54
2.	"Locate"	3:18
3.	"Let It Fall"	4:17
4.	"Is It Me or Is It You?"	6:27
5.	"Check Your Translation"	2:49
6.	"Pivot Signal"	5:00
7.	"Unbraid: The Merge"	5:25
8.	"Then the Wind Came"	2:56
9.	"There Is Something"	3:44
10.	"Give to the Water"	2:30
Total length:		40:18

== Personnel ==
Credits adapted from liner notes.

- Kaitlyn Aurelia Smith – performance, orchestral arrangement, recording, mixing
- Rob Frye – additional saxophone, additional woodwind
- Emily Lazar – mastering
- Sean Hellfritsch – artwork
