= The Kid (album) =

Studio album by Kaitlyn Aurelia Smith
- Released: October 6, 2017
- Studios: Touchtheplants (Glendale, California)
- Genres: Electronic; new-age pop; avant-garde; psychedelia
- Length: 51:35
- Label: Western Vinyl
- Producer: Kaitlyn Aurelia Smith

Kaitlyn Aurelia Smith chronology
Ears (2016)	The Kid (2017)	The Mosaic of Transformation (2020)

The Kid is the sixth studio album by American electronic musician Kaitlyn Aurelia Smith. It was released on October 6, 2017 by Western Vinyl. It's a concept album about the human life cycle and was described by the artist as "a journey from birth to death", while Smith depicts the four stages of life in the tracks of The Kid.

== Critical reception ==
Professional ratings
Aggregate scores
Source	Rating
AnyDecentMusic?	7.6/10
Metacritic	82/100
Review scores
Source	Rating
AllMusic	4.5/5 stars
The A.V. Club	A
Exclaim!	9/10
The Guardian	2/5 stars
Mixmag	8/10
Pitchfork	8.1/10
Record Collector	4/5 stars
Resident Advisor	4.0/5
Rolling Stone	4/5 stars
Uncut	8/10

The Kid received positive reviews from music critics. At Metacritic, which assigns a normalised rating out of 100 to reviews from mainstream critics, the album received an average score of 82, based on 18 reviews, which indicates "universal acclaim". Sasha Geffen of Pitchfork described The Kid as the most accessible album of Smith to date and stated that the artist "extracts as much joy as possible from the sadness." While rating the album 4 out of 5, AllMusic's Paul Simpson called "The Kid "a stunning work of highly advanced kaleidoscopic new age pop, and is easily Smith's best and most accessible release to date," stating that it "builds on Ears' seamless fusion of synthetic and organic sounds, combining the fluid tones of her preferred instrument, the Buchla Music Easel, with other synthesizers, such as the rare EMS Synthi 100."

Christopher R. Weingarten praised the album declaring that the artist "paints an even lusher world using cosmic swoops, squelches and lots of her highly processed vocals. Sounds don’t align with the rhythms, and Smith’s voice is awash in alien echoes." In a highly positive review, Kelsey J. Waite of The A.V. Club rated the album grade "A", while writing that the album "reaches a career high as the synthesist and composer ponders her existence, tracing the life cycle through four distinct stages" and opined that it is "truly an album to experience beginning to end." The music on the album has been described by critics as electronic, avant-garde, and "analogue psychedelia."

=== Accolades ===
Year-end lists for The Kid
Publication	Accolade	Rank	Ref.
AllMusic	Best of 2017	N/A	
AllMusic	Best Electronic Albums	N/A	
Bandcamp	Top 20 Albums of 2017	8	
Bleep	Top Ten Albums of 2017	6	
Fact	Top 50 Albums	20	
NME	Albums of The Year 2017	48	
Spin	Top 50 Albums	21	
The Vinyl Factory	Top 50 Albums of 2017	17	

== Track listing ==
All tracks are written by Kaitlyn Aurelia Smith.

The Kid track listing
No.	Title	Length
1.	"I Am a Thought"	1:53
2.	"An Intention"	4:00
3.	"A Kid"	5:04
4.	"In the World"	3:00
5.	"I Am Consumed"	0:54
6.	"In the World, but Not of the World"	3:57
7.	"I Am Learning"	3:15
8.	"To Follow & Lead"	4:48
9.	"Until I Remember"	4:23
10.	"Who I Am & Why I Am Where I Am"	5:20
11.	"I Am Curious, I Care"	3:44
12.	"I Will Make Room for You"	4:58
13.	"To Feel Your Best"	6:19
Total length:		51:35

== Personnel ==
Credits adapted from the liner notes of The Kid.

- Kaitlyn Aurelia Smith – performance, composition, recording, mixing, quartet arrangement
- Stargaze – quartet (tracks: 11–13)
- Emily Lazar – mastering
- Alex Trochut – design, typography
- Rob Moss Wilson – illustration
- Tim Saccenti – photography

== Charts ==
Chart performance for The Kid
Chart (2017)	Peak position
UK Dance Albums (Official Charts)	25
