= Before I Die (album) =

Studio album by Park Hye Jin
- Released: 10 September 2021
- Genre: Electronic
- Length: 43:40
- Label: Ninja Tune
- Producer: Park Hye Jin

Park Hye Jin chronology
How Can I (2020)	Before I Die (2021)	Sail the Seven Seas (2023)

Before I Die is the debut studio album by Park Hye Jin, a South Korean singer, rapper, record producer, and DJ based in Los Angeles. Entirely written, produced, and performed by herself, it was released on 10 September 2021 through Ninja Tune. It peaked at number 73 on the UK Album Downloads Chart. It won the Best Electronic Record award at the 2022 Libera Awards.

== Background ==
Park Hye Jin released her second EP, How Can I, in 2020. After that, she collaborated with other artists: Blood Orange on "Call Me (Freestyle)" (2020); Nosaj Thing on "Clouds" (2020); Clams Casino and Take a Daytrip on "Y Don't U" (2021).

Before I Die is her debut studio album. It is entirely written, produced, and performed by herself. A music video was released for the album's opening song "Let's Sing Let's Dance".

== Critical reception ==
Professional ratings
Aggregate scores
Source	Rating
Metacritic	75/100
Review scores
Source	Rating
AllMusic	3.5/5 stars
Beats Per Minute	78%
DIY	3/5 stars
The Guardian	3/5 stars
The Line of Best Fit	8/10
Loud and Quiet	6/10
NME	4/5 stars
Pitchfork	6.5/10
PopMatters	7/10
The Skinny	4/5 stars

According to the review aggregator Metacritic, Before I Die received "generally favorable reviews" based on a weighted average score of 75 out of 100 from 11 critic scores.

Adriane Pontecorvo of PopMatters commented that "every cut on Before I Die is so thoughtfully assembled that it becomes exquisitely casual, and Park Hye Jin shows her range as a producer worth keeping an eye on." Kyle Kohner of The Line of Best Fit stated, "Saturated with hazy bangers that explore the emotional gradient between depression and self-assurance, the appropriately titled Before I Die offers a space where yearning, anxiety, and bedridden gloom can coexist." Ben Jolley of NME called the album "an affecting multi-layered debut that, rather than reaching a conclusion of fulfilment, manages to find happiness in just being alive."

The album won the Best Electronic Record award at the 2022 Libera Awards.

=== Accolades ===
Year-end lists for Before I Die
Publication	List	Rank	Ref.
Billboard	The 20 Best Dance Albums of 2021	—	
Hot Press	Top 50 Albums of 2021	50	
The Line of Best Fit	The Best Albums of 2021	10	

== Track listing ==
All tracks are written by Park Hye Jin.

Before I Die track listing
No.	Title	Length
1.	"Let's Sing Let's Dance"	3:50
2.	"I Need You"	3:03
3.	"Before I Die"	3:06
4.	"Good Morning Good Night"	2:52
5.	"Me Trust Me"	1:33
6.	"Where Did I Go"	2:08
7.	"Never Give Up"	2:20
8.	"Can I Get Your Number"	3:14
9.	"Whatchu Doin Later"	2:57
10.	"Sex with Me (DEFG)"	2:28
11.	"Where Are You Think"	1:34
12.	"Never Die"	3:32
13.	"Hey, Hey, Hey"	4:56
14.	"Sunday ASAP"	2:17
15.	"I Jus Wanna Be Happy"	3:35
Total length:		43:40

== Personnel ==
Credits adapted from liner notes.

- Park Hye Jin – production, performance, mixing
- Tom Jessop – mixing, mastering
- Dan Medhurst – photography

== Charts ==
Chart performance for Before I Die
Chart (2021)	Peak position
UK Album Downloads (OCC)	73
