= Topical Dancer =

2022 album by Charlotte Adigéry and Bolis Pupul

Studio album by Charlotte Adigéry and Bolis Pupul
- Released: 4 March 2022
- Genres: Electronic; experimental
- Length: 50:43
- Languages: Creole, Dutch, English, French
- Label: Deewee
- Producers: Charlotte Adigéry; Bolis Pupul; Soulwax

Charlotte Adigéry chronology
Zandoli (2019)	Topical Dancer (2022)	Mainland Madinina (with Bolis Pupul) (2027)

Bolis Pupul chronology
Topical Dancer (2022)	Letter to Yu (2024)

Singles from Topical Dancer
- 1. "Thank You" Released: 22 September 2021; 2. "Blenda" Released: 3 November 2021; 3. "Haha" Released: 1 December 2021; 4. "Ceci n'est pas un cliché" Released: 27 January 2022; 5. "Making Sense Stop" Released: 3 March 2022

Topical Dancer is a studio album by Charlotte Adigéry and Bolis Pupul and co-written and co-produced by Soulwax. Released on 4 March 2022 under the label Deewee, Topical Dancer is Adigéry and Pupul's debut album as a duo.

== Background ==
Pupul and Adigéry are both based in Belgium with shared heritage from Martinique, a French island. They first met while working on the soundtrack of Belgica, a 2016 Belgian drama, after being invited by Soulwax, who also co-wrote and co-produced the album. The album is influenced by experiences of racial discrimination and sexual abuse. In the album, Adigéry sings in English, Dutch, Creole, and French. The album features Charlotte Adigéry's mother, Christiane Adigéry and was released under the label Deewee, which the duo previously released three EPs on. "Thank You" is the lead single of Topical Dancer and the second single is "Blenda". "Blenda" was released on 4 November 2021 along with an announcement of the album and its release date. The first track of the album "Bel Deewee" is a field recording of Adigéry entering the Deewee recording complex, which is also where they recorded the album, and calling through the intercom.

== Critical reception ==
Professional ratings
Aggregate scores
Source	Rating
Metacritic	85/100
Review scores
Source	Rating
AllMusic	4/5 stars
Beats Per Minute	88/100
DIY	4/5 stars
NME	4/5 stars
Pitchfork	8.2/10
The Observer	3/5 stars
The Skinny	5/5 stars

On the review aggregator Metacritic, which assigns a normalized rating out of 100 to reviews from professional publications, Topical Dancer received an average score of 85, based on six reviews, indicating "universal acclaim". Emily Mackay of The Observer called the album "banging fusion of funk, house and techno". Paul Simpson of AllMusic claimed the album was "catchiest and most danceable songs Adigéry and Pupul have written to date" and that the lyrics "offer a lot of food for thought". Eric Torres of Pitchfork called the album "riveting" and reported that the album had a "roguish charm". Jasper Willems wrote on Beats Per Minute that Topical Dancer is "spiritual palette cleanser as much as it is a physical one" and "a record for literally anyone". In a review written for NME, reviewer Max Pilley claimed that the album "arrived bursting with positive energy".

The album was nominated for Best Electronic Record at the 2023 Libera Awards.

In October 2025, Paste ranked the album at number 232 on their "250 Greatest Albums of the 21st Century So Far" list, writing: "Topical Dancer is a science experiment left unsupervised by a professor, but in turn yields a result of the future of electronic music."

== Track listing ==
All tracks are written and produced by Charlotte Adigéry, Bolis Pupul (Boris Zeebroek) and Soulwax (David Dewaele and Stephen Dewaele).

Topical Dancer track listing
No.	Title	Length
1.	"Bel Deewee"	0:42
2.	"Esperanto"	3:34
3.	"Blenda"	3:31
4.	"Hey"	3:36
5.	"It Hit Me"	5:33
6.	"Ich Mwen" (with Christiane Adigéry)	4:17
7.	"Reappropriate"	5:06
8.	"Ceci n'est pas un cliché"	3:46
9.	"Huile Smisse"	2:56
10.	"Mantra"	4:21
11.	"Making Sense Stop"	4:00
12.	"Haha"	3:26
13.	"Thank You"	5:51
Total length:		50:43

== Charts ==
=== Weekly charts ===
Weekly chart performance for Topical Dancer
Chart (2022)	Peak position
Belgian Albums (Ultratop Flanders)	2
Belgian Albums (Ultratop Wallonia)	44

=== Year-end charts ===
Year-end chart performance for Topical Dancer
Chart (2022)	Position
Belgian Albums (Ultratop Flanders)	140
