= Bieke Depoorter =

Belgian photographer

Bieke Depoorter (born 1986) is a Belgian photographer. The relationships she establishes with her subjects lie at the foundation of her practice. Depoorter is a member of Magnum Photos and has published the books Ou Menya (2011), I am About to Call it a Day (2014), As it May Be (2017), Mumkin. Est-ce possible? (2018), Sète#15 (2015), and Agata (2021). She has won the Magnum Expression Award, The Larry Sultan Award, and the Prix Levallois. She was one of four photographers shortlisted for the 2022 Deutsche Börse Photography Foundation Prize.

== Early life and education ==
Depoorter was born in Kortrijk, Belgium. She received a master's degree in photography at the Royal Academy of Fine Arts in Ghent in 2009.

== Life and work ==
The relationships Depoorter establishes with the subjects of her photographs lie at the foundation of her artistic practice. Accidental encounters are the starting point, and how these interactions naturally develop dictates the nature of Depoorter's work. Many of her self-initiated projects are about intimate situations in families and in peoples' homes. For her graduation project and her first book, Ou Menya (2011), she made three trips to Russia, photographing people in their homes that she met whilst travelling around. The series won the 2009 Magnum Expression Award. Depoorter made the work for her second book, I am About to Call it a Day (2014) in a similar way whilst hitchhiking and driving around the U.S.A.

In Agata, a project about a young woman Depoorter met in Paris in October 2017, she explores her interest in collaborative portraiture. It is an example of Depoorter's interest in finding people that can work with her in telling a story. These stories are always partially hers, and partially theirs.

Depoorter became a nominee member of Magnum Photos in 2012, an associate member in 2014, and a full member in 2016.

Depoorter directed a music video for Bolis Pupul's song "Completely Half" from his debut album Letter to Yu. The song and video were released on 29 November 2023.

== Personal life ==
Depoorter lives in the Muide neighborhood of Ghent with her boyfriend Boris Zeebroek, better known as the musician Bolis Pupul.

== Publications ==
- Ou Menya. Tielt: Lannoo, 2011. ISBN 9789020992137. Text in English, Dutch and French by Paul Demets, translation by Michael Lomax.
- I am About to Call it a Day. Zurich: Edition Patrick Frey, 2014. ISBN 9783905929690. With text by Maarten Dings.
- As It May Be. Lichtervelde: Uitgeverij Hannibal, 2017. ISBN 9789492677174. With text by Ruth Vandewalle.
  - New York: Aperture, 2018. With text by Ruth Vandewalle.
- Mumkin. Est-ce possible?. Paris: Xavier Barral, 2018. With text by Vandewalle. ISBN 978-2-36511-164-5.
- Sète#15. Le bec en l'air, 2015. ISBN 978-2-36744-079-8. With text by Christian Caujolle. In French and English.
- Agata. Ghent, Belgium: self-published, 2021. ISBN 978-9-46433-497-5. With text by Agata Korbus and Depoorter.
  - Second Edition. Ghent, Belgium: self-published / Des Palais, 2022. ISBN 978-9-46433-497-5. With text by Agata Kay and Depoorter.
- Blinked Myself Awake. Hannibal; This Book Is True, 2024. ISBN 978-94-6494-157-9.

== Films ==
- Dvalemodus – short film, co-directed with Mattias De Craene.

== Awards ==
- Magnum Expression Award
- The Larry Sultan Award
- Prix Levallois
- 2022: One of four shortlisted, Deutsche Börse Photography Foundation Prize for her exhibition A Chance Encounter that included the series Agata and Michael at C/O Berlin

== Exhibitions ==
=== Solo exhibitions ===
- Ou Menya, Kunsthal, Rotterdam, Netherlands, 2012
- Aller Retour, Buda Kunstencentrum, Kortrijk, Belgium, 2013
- Snapshot 11/ Namaste Brugge, Folklore Museum (Brugge), Bruges, Belgium, 2015
- I am About to Call it a Day, Museum Hilversum, Netherlands, 2017
- As it may be, Fotomuseum Den Haag, The Hague, Netherlands, 2017
- Bieke Depoorter 2015 – 2018, Fotomuseum Antwerp, Antwerp, Belgium, 2018; NRW Forum, Düsseldorf, Germany, 2019
- Agata, Bieke & Germaine, Kortrijk, Belgium, 2021; Ter Dilft, Bornem, Belgium, 2022
- A Chance Encounter, C/O Berlin, Berlin, 2022. With work from the series Agata and Michael that began with chance encounters.

=== Group exhibitions ===
- Magnum Manifesto, International Center of Photography, New York, 2017
- As it may be, Cortona on the move, Italy, 2018
- Woman in Focus, National Museum Cardiff, Cardiff, Wales, UK, 2018
- Players, Telefónica Building, Madrid, Spain, 2018
- Romanias, National Museum, Bucharest, Romania, 2019
- Because the night, Fotomuseum Winterthur, Switzerland, 2019
- De Nacht, Dvalemodus, De Warande (Turnhout), Belgium, 2020
- Close Enough: New Perspectives from 12 Women Photographers of Magnum, International Center of Photography, New York, 2022/23. With projects from 12 living women Magnum Photos members.
