= The Performer (James Righton album) =

Studio album by James Righton
- Released: 20 March 2020
- Length: 35:48
- Label: DeeWee
- Producer: James Righton

James Righton chronology
The Performer (2020)	Jim, I'm Still Here (2022)

Professional ratings
Aggregate scores
Source	Rating
Metacritic	75/100
Review scores
Source	Rating
AllMusic	3.5/5 stars
Clash	8/10
DIY	3/5 stars
Q	4/5 stars

The Performer is the debut studio album by English musician and former Klaxons band member James Righton. It was released on 20 March 2020 under DeeWee Records.

== Critical reception ==
The Performer was met with generally favorable reviews from critics. At Metacritic, which assigns a weighted average rating out of 100 to reviews from mainstream publications, this release received an average score of 75, based on 5 reviews. Yasmin Cowan from Clash said that the album "embarks on a cinematic journey with poignant lyricism, exquisite production and charismatically seductive soundscapes".

== Track listing ==
All tracks are written by James Righton.

The Performer track listing
No.	Title	Length
1.	"The Performer"	4:17
2.	"Edie"	3:53
3.	"See the Monster"	4:00
4.	"Devil Is Loose"	6:29
5.	"Lessons in Dreamland, Pt. 1"	1:12
6.	"Start"	3:16
7.	"Are You with Me?"	3:22
8.	"Heavy Heart"	4:05
9.	"Lessons in Dreamland, Pt. 2"	5:14
