= Performance (disambiguation) =

A performance, in performing arts, is generally an event in which a performer or group of performers behave in a particular way for another group of people.

Performance may also refer to:

== Arts and media ==
- Performance art, art work presented within a fine art context
- Performing arts, in which artists use their voices or bodies for artistic expression

=== Film and television ===
- Performance (film), a 1970 film starring James Fox and Mick Jagger
- Performance (British TV series), British television series of the 1990s
- Performance (Canadian TV series), Canadian television series of the 1970s
- A Late Quartet, a 2012 film released in Australia under the name Performance
- Performance Channel, a former UK cable and satellite channel

=== Music ===
- Performance (soundtrack), a soundtrack album from the 1970 film, or the title song by Bernie Krause and Merry Clayton
- Performance (Eloy album), 1983
- Performance (Marti Webb album), 1989
- Performance (Spacemen 3 album), 1988
- Performance (White Denim album) or the title song, 2018
- The Performance, an album by Shirley Bassey, 2009
- Performance (EP), by Kylie Minogue, 2010
- Rising (Donovan album), 1990; re-released as Performance, 1997
- "Performance", a song by Priestess from Hello Master, 2005
- "Performance", a song by the xx from I See You, 2017
- "Performance", a concert tour in 1991 by the English duo The Pet Shop Boys

=== Other media ===
- Performance!, a 2000 book of photographs by Clive Barda

== Business processes ==
- Job performance, a measure of the effectiveness of an employee
- Performance Bicycle, now Advanced Sports International
- Performance engineering
- Performance improvement
- Performance management
- Performance measurement

== Computing ==
- Computer performance
  - Performance analysis
  - Performance tuning
  - Software performance testing
- Network performance

== Humanities and social sciences ==
- Linguistic performance, the act of producing an utterance
- The performative turn, a paradigmatic shift in the humanities and social sciences
  - Performative text, in philosophy of language
- Performance of a contract, in law
  - Specific performance, a legal remedy
- A ritual in a religious or occult setting

== Other uses ==
- Performance (textiles), capacity of textiles to withstand certain conditions
- The execution of an experiment in science

== See also ==
- Performance testing (disambiguation)
- Aircraft performance, including landing performance
- Bicycle performance, including mechanical efficiency and energy efficiency
- Performer (disambiguation)
