= Benjamin (2018 British film) =

- Film poster
- Directed by: Simon Amstell
- Written by: Simon Amstell
- Produced by: Dominic Dromgoole; Alexandra Breede; Louise Simpson
- Starring: Colin Morgan; Anna Chancellor; Phénix Brossard; Jack Rowan; Jessica Raine
- Cinematography: David Pimm
- Music by: James Righton
- Production company: Open Palm Films
- Distributed by: Verve Pictures
- Release dates: October 19, 2018 (BFI London Film Festival); March 15, 2019 (United Kingdom)
- Running time: 85 minutes
- Country: United Kingdom
- Language: English
- Box office: $97,521

Benjamin is a 2018 British comedy-drama feature film, written and directed by Simon Amstell. It stars Colin Morgan, Phénix Brossard, Joel Fry, Jessica Raine, Jack Rowan and Anna Chancellor. The film features original music from James Righton (of the Klaxons). It tells the story of an up-and-coming filmmaker's struggle to find connection when he meets an enchanting French musician.

The film was announced by Open Palm Films in 2017 and premiered at the BFI London Film Festival 2018. It was released in select UK cinemas in 2019.

The film was nominated for the Grand Jury Award for Best film at the 2019 Milan International Lesbian and Gay Film Festival and won the Audience Award.

== Plot ==
Benjamin, a rising young filmmaker struggling to replicate his early success, previews his newest film: a romantic drama about his character's doomed relationship with his boyfriend and inability to love. Despite his producer Tessa's reassurances to the contrary, Benjamin is deeply anxious about the film, contending with fear of judgment and cripplingly low self-esteem.

At a reporter friend's invitation, Benjamin and his best friend Stephen attend a party where Benjamin meets and promptly becomes captivated by a French singer onstage, Noah. Benjamin later joins Noah and his bandmates for dinner and the two begin a burgeoning romance, spending the night and the following day together.

As Benjamin's film premiere approaches, he panics and insists that his producer reinsert a controversial set of scenes into the film, of a Buddhist monk discussing the idea of self. While the rest of the film is well-received, these extended scenes are panned by the audience and critics alike. After the screening, Noah breaks up with Benjamin, saying he is not ready for a relationship.

A heartbroken Benjamin meets up with his reporter friend Billie and her sometimes-boyfriend Harry—the same actor who played Benjamin's boyfriend in his film. The two argue frequently and have cheated on each other multiple times. Harry expresses interest in writing a film with Benjamin, but when Benjamin agrees, Harry propositions him instead. The two sleep together, but Harry later clarifies that it was a one-time experiment.

Still missing Noah, Benjamin seeks him out and asks if they might continue seeing each other, without formally labeling it a relationship. Noah agrees, much to Benjamin's delight. Over time, the two grow closer. At one point, when Benjamin seems anxious, Noah silently stares into Benjamin's eyes to calm him down, before formally asking Benjamin to be his boyfriend. Benjamin accepts.

Benjamin is having dinner with Noah's parents when his ex-boyfriend, Paul, enters the restaurant. When Benjamin calls him over, Paul publicly confronts him about his recent film, which was partly inspired by their relationship. Later, Paul argues that Benjamin is repeating old patterns and remains incapable of love. Tensions remain high after the dinner, with Benjamin embarrassed and anxious that he will wind up hurting Noah as he did Paul. Despite Noah's attempts to reassure him, Benjamin winds up pushing him away.

Upset, Benjamin later consumes magic mushrooms and becomes deeply inebriated. Now thoroughly alone, Benjamin repeatedly tries to call his friend Stephen. The next day, with his calls still going to voicemail, Benjamin gets worried and goes to Stephen's house, breaking his window. Upon seeing Stephen, caught up in relief and lingering heartbreak, Benjamin bursts into tears and realizes that he needs to see Noah.

Benjamin runs to Noah's gig and is moved to tears by Noah's heartbreaking performance, with lyrics that seem to be about him. After the show, he tells Noah that he's made a mistake, confessing that what is scarier than being incapable of love is the fact that he in fact loves Noah. Noah challenges Benjamin by asking him to return with him to Paris. Although Benjamin initially panics at the thought, he calms himself by looking into Noah's eyes and accepts the offer.

== Cast ==
- Colin Morgan as Benjamin
- Anna Chancellor as Tessa
- Phénix Brossard as Noah
- Jack Rowan as Harry
- Jessica Raine as Billie
- Joel Fry as Stephen
- Nathan Stewart-Jarrett as Paul
- Mawaan Rizwan as Dhani
- James Bloor as Alex (photographer)
- Jessie Cave as Martha
- Arnab Chanda as Guru
- Gabe Gilmour as Bodhi
- Robin Peters as Editor
- Simon Mayo as himself

== Musicians ==
"Noah's Band"

- Phénix Brossard on vocals
- Naomi Soneye-Thomas on keyboard
- Loris Scarpa on drums
- Silas Wyatt-Blake on acoustic guitar
- George Jennings on electric guitar

"Guildhall"

- Natalie L. Hancock on cello
- Ben Daniel-Greep on double bass
- Andy Massey as piano double

== Reception ==
The film holds a score of 90% on review aggregator Rotten Tomatoes, based on 40 critics’ reviews, with an average rating of 7.3 out of 10. The website's critics consensus reads, "Inspired by first-time feature filmmaker Simon Amstell's own experiences, Benjamin is a heartfelt ode to the search for human connection." On Metacritic, the film holds a weighted average score of 70 out of 100 based on nine critics, indicating "generally favorable" reviews.
