= Park Hye Jin (music producer) =

Korean musical artist (born 1994)

- Born: 26 March 1994 (age 32); South Korea
- Origin: Los Angeles, California, U.S
- Genre: Electronic
- Occupations: Singer; rapper; record producer; DJ
- Years active: 2018–present
- Label: Ninja Tune

Park Hye Jin (Korean: 박혜진) (26 March 1994) is a South Korean singer, rapper, record producer, and DJ. In 2021, she released her debut studio album, Before I Die. It won the Best Electronic Record award at the 2022 Libera Awards.

== Biography ==
Park Hye Jin was born in South Korea. After living in Melbourne and London, she moved to Los Angeles, California. She began experimenting with rapping and singing circa 2015, and began learning to DJ circa 2017. She taught herself to produce music on Ableton.

In 2018, she released her debut EP, If U Want It. In 2020, she released the follow-up EP, How Can I, on Ninja Tune. Her debut studio album, Before I Die, was released on Ninja Tune in 2021. It won the Best Electronic Record award at the 2022 Libera Awards. In 2023, she released Sail the Seven Seas.

She has also collaborated with other artists: Blood Orange on "Call Me (Freestyle)" (2020); Nosaj Thing on "Clouds" (2020); Clams Casino and Take a Daytrip on "Y Don't U" (2021).

== Musical style and influences ==
Her talent was first recognized overseas, and with the release of her EP If U Want It, the term "K-House" was coined for the first time. Following the release of her debut EP If U Want It, several major international media outlets coined the term "K-House" to describe her music. However, in a 2020 interview, she stated that she does not want to be limited to that. Jade Gomez of Paste wrote, "The Korean multi-hyphenate is not content with sticking to one genre, instead building her own universe full of influences ranging from hip-hop to house."

== Discography ==
=== Studio albums ===
- Before I Die (2021)
- Sail the Seven Seas (2023)
- So Much Have Fun (2026)

=== EPs ===
- If U Want It (2018)
- How Can I (2020)

=== Singles ===
- "Can You (Galcher Lustwerk Remix)" (2020)
- "Call Me (Freestyle)" (with Blood Orange, 2020)
- "Clouds" (with Nosaj Thing, 2020)
- "Y Don't U" (with Clams Casino and Take a Daytrip, 2021)

=== Guest appearances ===
- Baltra – Ted ("Ahead of Time", 2019)
