= Die Verboten =

Belgian krautrock band

- Origin: Belgium
- Genres: Krautrock
- Years active: 2006–present
- Spinoff of: Soulwax
- Members: Stephen Dewaele; David Dewaele; Henry Smithson (Riton) "Fergus"

Die Verboten is a Belgian krautrock-influenced band formed by David and Stephen Dewaele of Soulwax. The project, which also includes English-born electro artist Riton and his brother-in-law the artist and designer Fergadelic was announced in late 2006 in Belgian weekly magazine HUMO.

In an interview with Resident Advisor in April 2007, Riton said he was close to finishing the Die Verboten EP with the Dewaele brothers.

On Tuesday 19 May 2009, FACT magazine announced details of the first DIE VERBOTEN release 'Live in Eivissa'- an 18-minute recording on 12" vinyl with 3D pyramid artwork.

In an interview with Resident Advisor, David and Fergadelic talk about the future of Die Verboten. David:"You can expect the next release to be a DVD (DieVerbotenDisc) which will include everything we have recorded until now - two albums worth of material".

This album / DVD was supposed to drop in 2009.

The album "2007" was released worldwide in 2015.
