= Charlotte Adigéry =

Belgian musician (born 1990)

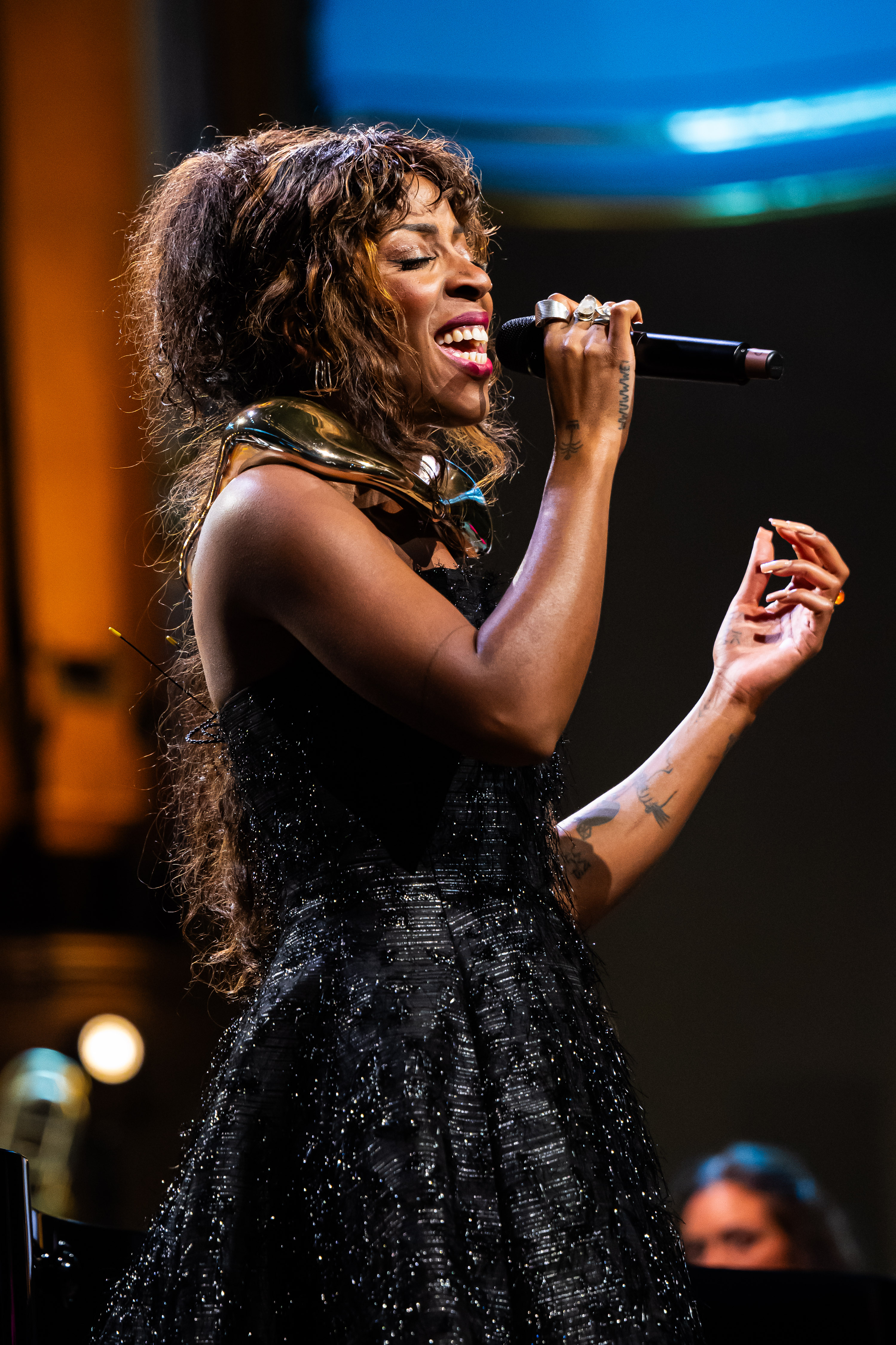
- Adigéry at the opening concert of the Belgian Presidency of the Council of the European Union in January 2024

Background information
- Also known as: WWWater
- Born: 6 August 1990 (age 36); Narbonne, France
- Origin: Ghent, Flanders, Belgium
- Genres: Electronica, Avant-pop, R&B, World, Experimental
- Occupation: Singer
- Instrument: Voice
- Years active: 2017–present
- Label: Deewee

Charlotte Adigéry (French pronunciation: [ʃaʁlɔt adiʒeʁi]), also known as WWWater, is a Belgian musician and singer, known for her eclectic sound that blends electronic music with experimental pop, funk, and socially conscious lyrics.

== Early life and education ==
Adigéry was born in France and grew up in Ghent, Belgium. She is of Martinican and Guadeloupean descent. Adigéry attended college in Hasselt, where she studied music.

== Career ==
In 2016, Adigéry contributed vocals to "The Best Thing" a song on the 2016 Belgica film soundtrack that was scored by David and Stephen Dewaele, aka Soulwax or 2ManyDJs.

In 2017, Adigéry released a self-titled four-song EP on Deewee. The record features Adigéry singing in English, French and Créole. It was written and produced with and by Bolis Pupul and mixed by the Dewaele brothers.

In 2019, Adigéry released an EP called Zandoli that was written and produced by Bolis Pupul and co-produced plus mixed by Stephen and David Dewaele from Soulwax and was released on the record label Deewee. She sings in Creole on the first track called "Paténipat". The song was featured in the trailer for the John Malkovich 2020 HBO TV series, The New Pope. As part of the promotion of Zandoli, Adigéry did a Take Away Show which was shot at the Pete the Monkey Festival in July 2019 by La Blogothèque.

In 2019, Adigéry released a limited to 300 edition cassette single called Yin Yang Self-Meditation on Deewee made with frequent collaborator Bolis Pupul and the Dewaele brothers. Adigéry uses stream of consciousness to explore racism, writing music, and what it means to be an artist.

Adigéry also records under the moniker WWWater, a project which is more raw and punk.

Adigéry has toured with Neneh Cherry.

== Honors ==
- 2019: The NME 100: Essential new artists for 2019
- 2019: Focus Knack, Human of the Year
- 2019: Music Industry Awards: Breakthrough, Alternative and Artwork (nominee)
- 2020: Music Moves Europe Talent Awards, (nominee)
- 2023: Music Industry Awards: Producer and Artwork.
- 2024: Music Industry Awards: Live act

== Discography ==
=== WWWater ===
- 2017: La Falaise EP (self-released)

=== Charlotte Adigéry ===
- 2017: Charlotte Adigéry EP (Deewee)
- 2019: Zandoli EP (Deewee)
- 2019: Yin Yang Self-Meditation limited edition cassette (Deewee)
- 2022: Topical Dancer with Bolis Pupul (Deewee)
- 2027: Mainland Madinina with Bolis Pupul (Deewee)

=== Collaborations ===
- 2016: Belgica film soundtrack, "The Best Thing" by Soulwax – vocals
- 2024: Affection, album by Bullion “ World_train” - vocals
