= The Performer (Marty Robbins album) =

Studio album by Marty Robbins
- Released: 1979
- Genre: Country
- Label: CBS
- Producer: Billy Sherrill

Marty Robbins chronology
Don’t Let Me Touch You (1977)	The Performer (1979)	All Around Cowboy (1979)

The Performer is an album by American country music singer and songwriter Marty Robbins released in 1978 by Columbia Records. The album peaked at #47 on the US country chart and #7 on the Canadian country chart. Two singles from the album charted in the country charts: "Please Don't Play a Love Song" was #17 in both the US and Canada, and "Touch Me With Magic" reached #15 in the United States and #18 in Canada. This was his penultimate album issued prior to his death in 1982, and concentrated on country ballads.

== Track listing ==
All tracks composed by Marty Robbins except where indicated.

Side 1

1. "Please Don't Play a Love Song” (Billy Sherrill, Stephen Davis) – 3:04
2. "Confused and Lonely" – 2:37
3. "Look What You’ve Done” (Steve Gibb) – 3:20
4. "You’re Not Ready For Me Yet" – 3:07
5. "Another Pack of Cigarettes, Another Glass of Wine" – 3:00

Side 2

1. "My Elusive Dreams" (Curly Putman, Billy Sherrill) – 3:42
2. "Jenny" (Gail Davies) – 3:00
3. "Oh, Regina" – 2:24
4. "Touch Me With Magic" (Steve Bogard, Mike Utley) – 2:41
5. "The Performer" – 3:20

NB: All tracks produced in 1979 except side 1, track 1 and side 2, track 2, both produced in 1978.

== Production ==
- Producer: Billy Sherrill
- Engineer: Lou Bradley
- Recorded at: CBS Recording Studios, Nashville, Tennessee
- Background vocals: The Nashville Edition
- Strings arranged by: Bill McElhiney & Bill Justis
- Hargus "Pig" Robbins (piano) appeared courtesy of Elektra Records
- Album cover photography: Slick Lawson
- Album cover design: William J. Johnson/Virginia Team
