= Kaitlyn Aurelia Smith =

American synthesizer player and composer

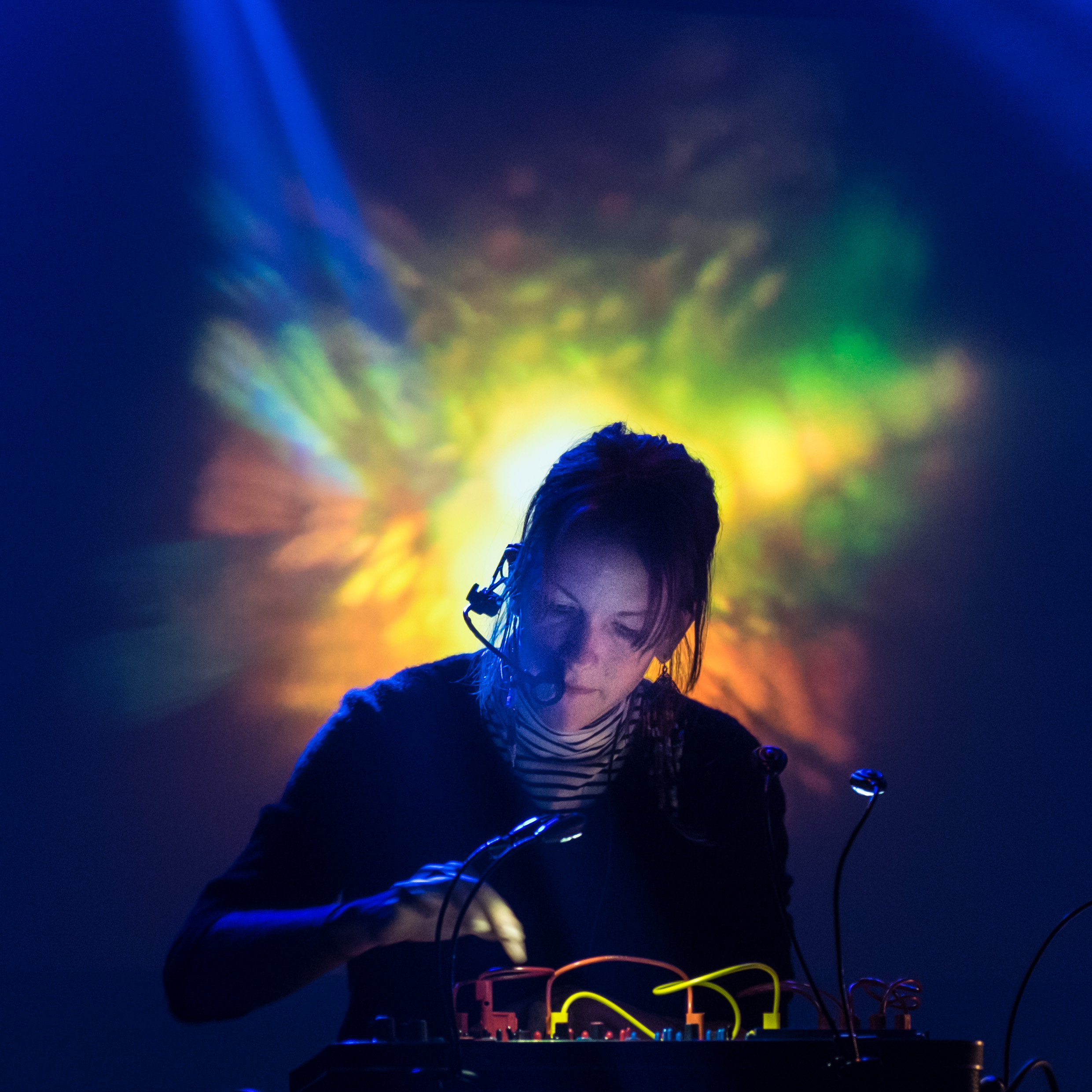
- Kaitlyn Aurelia Smith, Reims Cartonerie, 26 March 2016

Background information
- Born: 1987 (age 38–39); Pacific Northwest, United States
- Genres: Electronic; new-age; ambient pop; psychedelia
- Occupations: Composer; producer; musician
- Instruments: Keyboard; modular synthesizer; saxophone; voice
- Years active: 2010–present
- Labels: Western Vinyl; Ghostly International; Nettwerk; Someone Special
- Formerly of: Ever Isles
- Website: kaitlynaureliasmith.com

Kaitlyn Aurelia Smith is an American composer, performer, and producer, originally from the Pacific Northwest and currently based in Los Angeles. Her work prominently employs Buchla modular synthesizers. She received acclaim for her albums Ears (2016) and The Kid (2017). She has collaborated with Suzanne Ciani and Emile Mosseri.

== Early life and education ==
Smith grew up and was home-educated on Orcas Island, Northwestern Washington. She left the island to study composition and sound engineering at Berklee College of Music in Boston, before returning to the island after her graduation. Smith performed in the indie folk duo Ever Isles while still at Berklee.

It was after returning home that Smith discovered synthesizers, when a neighbor who shared her interest in Terry Riley introduced her to the Buchla 100 Synthesizer. Having originally intended to use her voice as her primary instrument, and then moving to classical guitar and piano, Smith switched to the use of synthesizer after being lent and experimenting with the Buchla 100 for a year, explaining, "I got so distracted and enamored with the process of making sounds with [the Buchla's] that I abandoned the next Ever Isles album." She also frequently uses the Buchla Music Easel.

== Career ==
Smith contributed sound design work to the music video for Panda Bear's "Boys Latin" in 2014. In 2015, she signed to independent record label Western Vinyl and released her first official album, Euclid. In 2016, she received acclaim for her 2016 album Ears and collaborated with synthesizer-based composer Suzanne Ciani on a RVNG Intl. release entitled Sunergy. Her album, The Mosaic of Transformation, was released in May 2020.

Smith also released Let's Turn It into Sound (2022), Gush (2025), and Thoughts on the Future (2025). Smith and James Daniel founded the record label Someone Special in 2026. She is scheduled to release Ruin: It's Not Just Music on October 2, 2026.

Smith composed the score for Bernardo Britto's film Omni Loop (2024).

== Musical approach ==
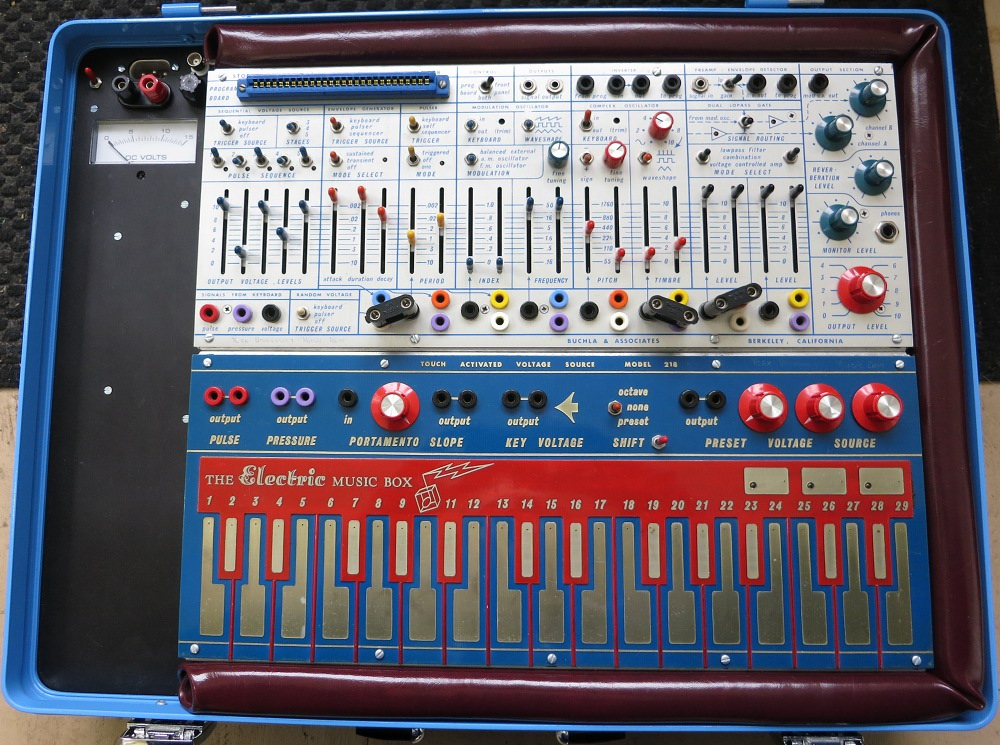
Buchla Music Easel synthesizer

Smith's music makes prominent use of Buchla synthesizers, specifically the Buchla 100 and Musical Easel. She stated that "there’s a lot of room for happy accidents with a Buchla synthesizer because it’s not very predictable. If you turn on a light in the room that you’re working in or if the grounding isn’t properly grounded or if you plug in something else, all of a sudden something will change. That gives me this feeling of working with a life, and that there is a biofeedback, more so than a predictable synthesizer." She has stated that "I try and blend in as many different tones / timbres as possible […] I like to imagine what that sound would feel like if I were to touch it and vice versa."

== Discography ==
=== Studio albums ===
- Cows Will Eat the Weeds (self-released, 2012)
- Useful Trees (self-released, 2012)
- Tides (Western Vinyl, 2014)
- Euclid (Western Vinyl, 2015)
- Ears (Western Vinyl, 2016)
- Sunergy (with Suzanne Ciani; RVNG Intl., 2016)
- The Kid (Western Vinyl, 2017)
- The Mosaic of Transformation (Ghostly International, 2020)
- I Could Be Your Dog (Prequel) (with Emile Mosseri; Ghostly International, 2021)
- Let's Turn It into Sound (Ghostly International, 2022)
- Gush (Nettwerk, 2025)
- Ruin: It's Not Just Music (Someone Special, 2026)

=== Mini albums ===
- Thoughts on the Future (Nettwerk, 2025)

=== Singles ===
- "Swan" (2012)
- "Milk" (2012)
- "Anthropoda"
- "Riparian" (2016)
- "An Intention" (2017)
- "To Follow and Lead" (2017)
- "I Will Make Room for You (Four Tet Remix)" (2017)
- "Expanding Electricity" (2019)
- "Lagoon" (2019)
- "Log in Your Fire" (with Emile Mosseri; 2020)
- "GTP!" and "Ruin" (2026)

=== Remixes ===
Year	Title
2015	Bayonne - Spectrolite (Kaitlyn Aurelia Smith Remix)
2015	Maestro - Darlin' Celsa (Kaitlyn Aurelia Smith Remix)
2016	Max Richter - Dream 3 (Kaitlyn Aurelia Smith Remix)
2016	The Field - Reflecting Lights (Kaitlyn Aurelia Smith Mix)
2016	The Invisible - Love Me Again feat. Anna Calvi (Kaitlyn Aurelia Smith Mix)
2016	D.D Dumbo - Walrus (Kaitlyn Aurelia Smith Mix)
2017	Perfume Genius - Wreath (Kaitlyn Aurelia Smith Remix)
2022	King Gizzard & The Lizard Wizard - Catching Smoke (Kaitlyn Aurelia Smith Remix) Danny Elfman - In Time (Kaitlyn Aurelia Smith Remix) 2022-8-10

== Filmography ==
=== Feature films ===
- Omni Loop (2024)

=== Short films ===
- Fortraits
- DIY TV
- Cabin Porn
- Brasilia: City of the Future (2015)
- First People
- Elf Help (2016)
- Google - The Hidden Worlds of the National Parks
