= Pete the Monkey Festival =

Music festival

- Genre: various, eclectic, primarily alternative rock
- Dates: 14 - 15–16 July 2016
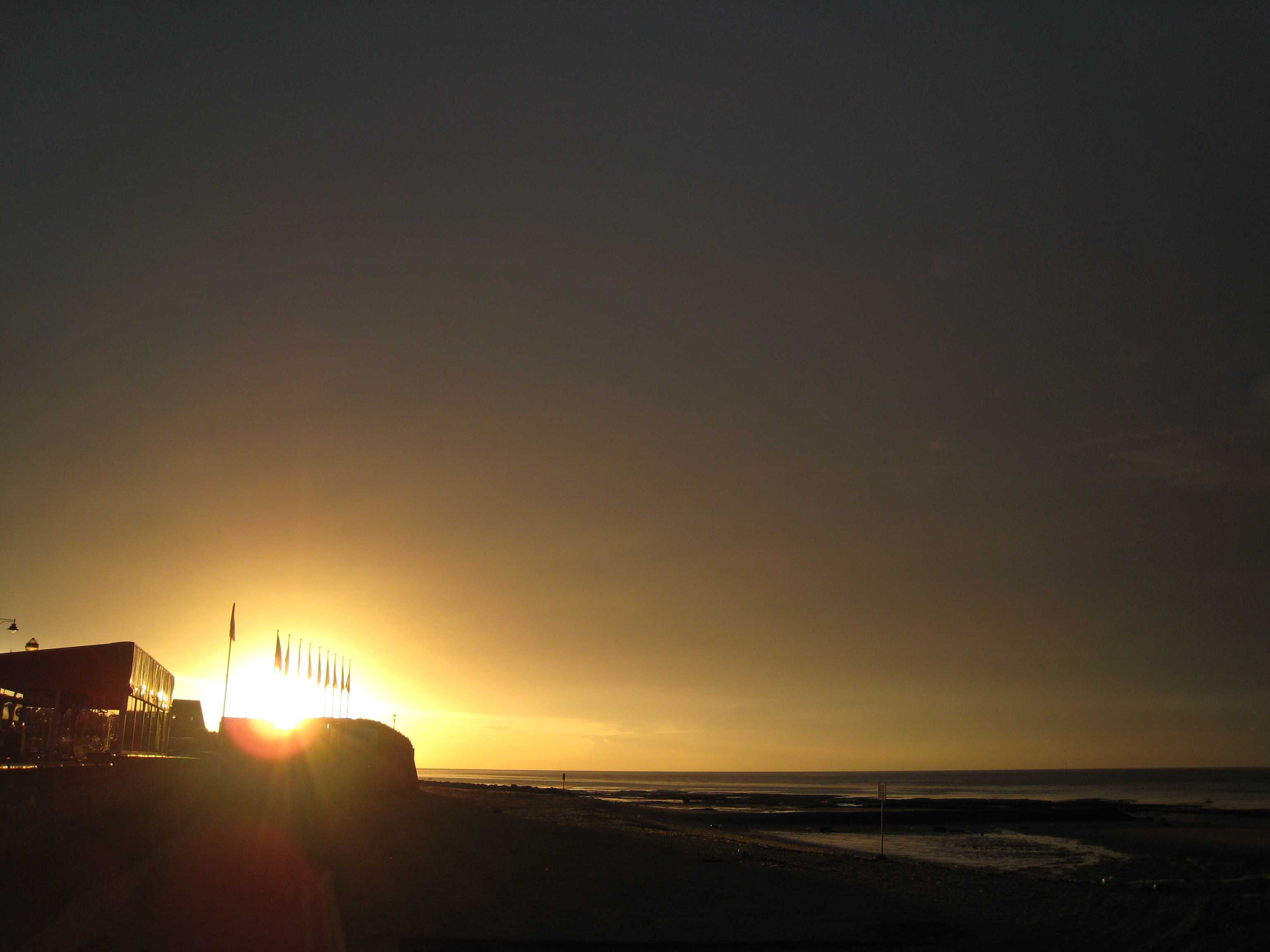
- Locations: Normandy, France Saint-aubin-sur-mer-calvados-coucher-de-soleil
- Years active: 2011-present
- Founders: Rob Dumas and Louis Dumas
- Website: http://www.petethemonkeyfestival.org

The Pete the Monkey festival is an outdoor music festival which takes place over three days each July and is situated in rural Saint-Aubin-sur-Mer in upper Normandy.

Aside from hosting music and arts, the event's main target is to raise funds for a monkey sanctuary in El Chapar, Bolivia. The festival site is 150 meters from the beach and the organisers aim to present emerging artists from both sides of the English channel. French national newspaper Le Monde reviewed the festival in 2014, calling it "a secret little paradise". At the fourth edition of the festival, broadcaster TV5 Monde reviewed the festival highlighting the originality of the programming and praised the family friendly atmosphere.

== Association Pete the Monkey ==
Created following the success of a viral video, the Pete the Monkey association offers financial support towards building ‘Jacj Cuisi’, the biggest monkey sanctuary in Bolivia, situated where Amazonian monkeys are victims of criminal trafficking.

== History ==
The festival started as a 350-person party. By the third edition in 2014, the festival had grown into a boutique size 1000 capacity themed festival. The fourth edition in July 2015 was sold out prior the event with 1500 weekend tickets. The organisers aim to keep festival at a small size. Le Monde interviewed the festival co-director to talk about the impact of boutique festivals in France.

The festival was nominated at the 2015 AIM Awards for Best Independent Festival.

== Pete the Monkey mentality ==
The festival is curated as a family-friendly affair during the day; but at night gigs and DJ's take over to cater for a more adult crowd. The festival sets a theme every year. Costumes and fancy dress are encouraged. The themes are: Mother nature (2012), Where the wild things are (2013), A walk on the wild side (2014). The theme for 2015 was phrased in French as: "Les naufragés de la jungle", which literally translates as 'Shipwrecked in the jungle'. It comes from a French title of a children's adventure story written by Howard Pease.

== Previous Line-up ==
Previous lineups include: Jupiter & Okwess International, Acid Arab, Loyle Carner, Jacques, Isaac delusion, Thylacine, La Yegros, Blue Hawaii, We Were Evergreen, London Contemporary Voices, Cléa Vincent, Babe, Bon Voyage Organisation, Fishbach, Palace, Peter and Kerry, Agua Roja, L’imperatrice, Camp Claude, Cubenx, Robyn Sherwell, Khushi, Emile Omar and Flairs.

== Friends of the Festival ==
The festival is organised from Paris and London. As many of the operations are co-ordinated from London, the festival is a member of the Association of independent festivals. The festival aims to remain independent, but in 2014 received support from companies including Lush cosmetics, Radio Nova, DFDS Ferries, Grolsch France, and Digitick.

== Stages ==
The main music and arts are celebrated over two stages, with a third stage providing late night revelry.

=== Main Stage ===
This stage hosts most of the bands. The stage is set up on an old tennis court, on two large tractor trailers.

=== Barn stage ===
This stage is open to DJs for late night partying.

=== Acoustic stage ===
This stage is situated under a big oak tree, and serves as a more intimate space for smaller more acoustic based bands.

=== Silent stage ===
This stage is situated in the forest area, and serves live music and DJ sets through wireless headphones.
