= Depeche Mode discography =

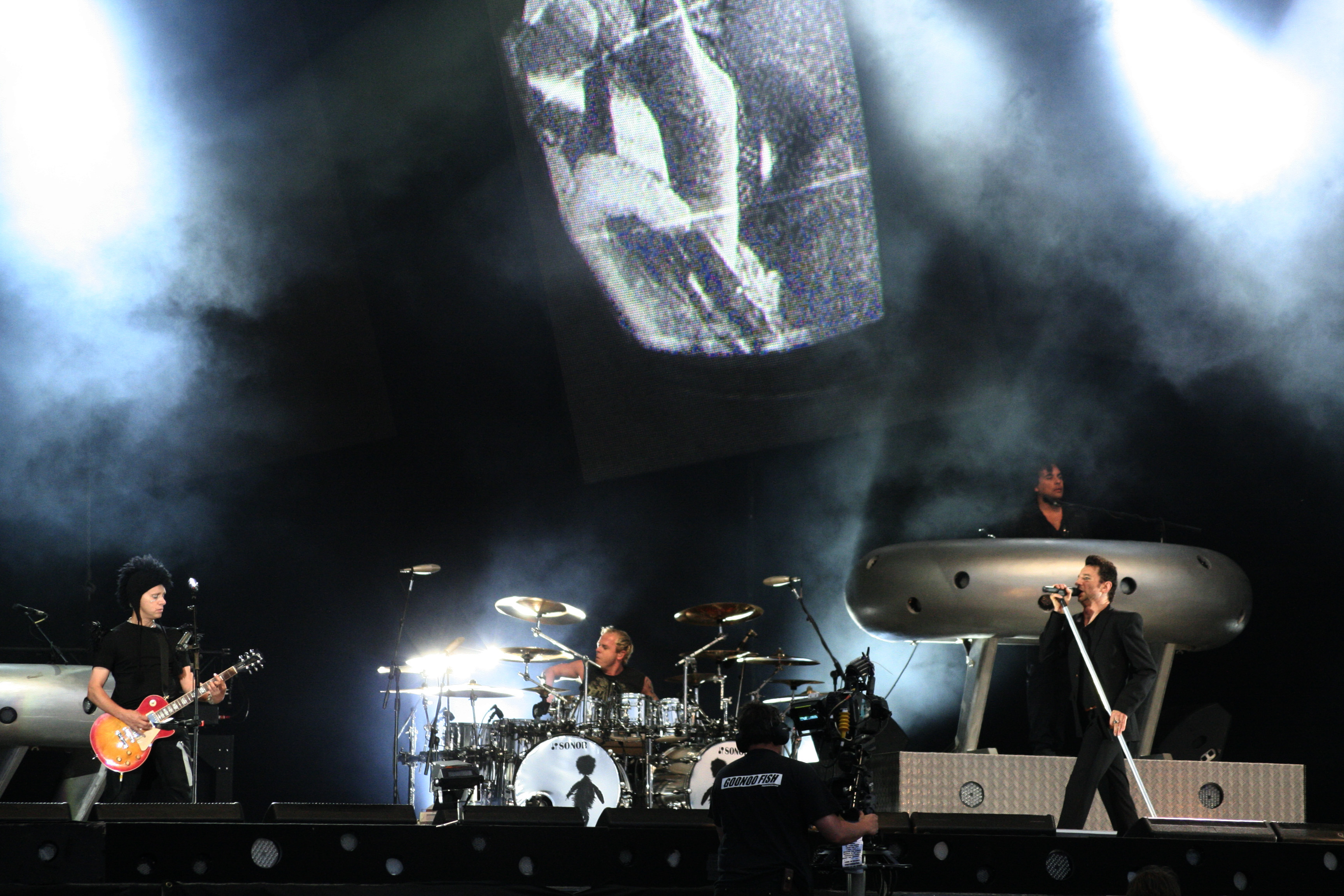
- Depeche Mode performing at the 2006 O_{2} Wireless Festival
- Studio albums: 15
- Live albums: 6
- Compilation albums: 9
- Singles: 61
- Box sets: 24

The discography of English electronic music band Depeche Mode consists of 15 studio albums, six live albums, nine compilation albums, 24 box sets and 61 singles. The band's music has been released on several labels, including Some Bizzare, Mute Records, Sire Records, Reprise Records, and Columbia Records. Formed in Basildon, Essex, England in 1980, the group's original line-up was Dave Gahan (lead vocals), Martin Gore (keyboards, guitar, vocals, chief songwriter after 1981), Andy Fletcher (keyboards, bass guitar) and Vince Clarke (keyboards, chief songwriter through 1981). Clarke left the band after the release of their 1981 debut album Speak & Spell. Gahan, Gore and Fletcher recruited Alan Wilder (production, keyboards, drums) initially as a touring musician, while recording their second album A Broken Frame as a trio. In late 1982, Wilder was promoted to full band membership, remaining with Depeche Mode until 1995. Following Wilder's departure, Gahan, Gore, and Fletcher continued as a trio until Fletcher's death in 2022, since which time Gahan and Gore have continued as a duo.

Since their debut in 1981, Depeche Mode have had 54 songs in the UK Singles Chart, as well as one US, and two UK number one albums (Songs of Faith and Devotion and Ultra). All studio albums have reached Top 10 in the UK. Also they had seven number one albums in the German Album Charts from 1993 to 2017. According to their record company, Depeche Mode have sold in excess of 100 million records worldwide. The group's concert video Devotional was nominated for "Best Long Form Music Video" at the 37th Grammy Awards in 1995. "Suffer Well", the third single off the album Playing the Angel, was nominated in the category for "Best Dance Recording" at the 49th Grammy Awards in 2007. On 19 December 2006, Depeche Mode's back catalogue was released on the iTunes Store as The Complete Depeche Mode. On 3 December 2009, Sounds of the Universe was nominated for a Grammy Award for Best Alternative Album. They received a second nomination for the video "Wrong": for Best Short Form Music Video at the 52nd Annual Grammy Awards.

== Albums ==
=== Studio albums ===
List of studio albums, with selected chart positions and certifications
Title	Details	Peak chart positions										Certifications
Title	Details	UK	AUS	AUT	FRA	GER	ITA	NLD	SWE	SWI	US	Certifications
Speak & Spell	Released: 5 October 1981; Label: Mute; Formats: CD, CS, LP	10	28	—	—	49	99	—	21	—	192	BPI: Gold; BVMI: Gold; IFPI SWE: Gold
A Broken Frame	Released: 27 September 1982; Label: Mute; Formats: CD, CS, LP	8	—	—	194	56	88	—	22	—	177	BPI: Gold
Construction Time Again	Released: 22 August 1983; Label: Mute; Formats: CD, CS, LP	6	—	—	—	7	—	32	12	21	—	BPI: Gold; BVMI: Gold
Some Great Reward	Released: 24 September 1984; Label: Mute; Formats: CD, CS, LP	5	—	19	—	3	32	34	7	5	51	BPI: Silver; BVMI: Gold; RIAA: Platinum
Black Celebration	Released: 17 March 1986; Label: Mute; Formats: CD, CS, LP	4	69	26	19	2	17	35	5	1	90	BPI: Silver; BVMI: Platinum; RIAA: Gold; SNEP: Gold
Music for the Masses	Released: 28 September 1987; Label: Mute; Formats: CD, CS, LP	10	60	16	7	2	7	52	4	4	35	BPI: Silver; BVMI: Gold; IFPI SWE: Gold; RIAA: Platinum; SNEP: Platinum
Violator	Released: 19 March 1990; Label: Mute; Formats: CD, CS, LP, DCC, MD	2	42	4	1	2	5	17	6	2	7	BPI: Gold; BVMI: Platinum; FIMI: Platinum; IFPI AUT: Gold; IFPI SWE: Gold; IFPI SWI: Platinum; RIAA: 3× Platinum; SNEP: Platinum
Songs of Faith and Devotion	Released: 22 March 1993; Label: Mute, Reprise; Formats: CD, CS, LP, DCC, MD	1	14	1	1	1	1	18	2	1	1	BPI: Gold; BVMI: Gold; IFPI AUT: Gold; IFPI SWI: Gold; RIAA: Platinum; SNEP: 2× Gold
Ultra	Released: 14 April 1997; Label: Mute; Formats: CD, CS, LP	1	7	5	2	1	2	17	1	4	5	BPI: Gold; BVMI: Gold; IFPI SWE: Gold; IFPI SWI: Gold; RIAA: Gold; SNEP: Gold
Exciter	Released: 14 May 2001; Label: Mute; Formats: CD, CS, LP, MD, digital download	9	20	2	1	1	2	15	1	2	8	BPI: Gold; BVMI: Platinum; IFPI AUT: Gold; IFPI SWE: Gold; IFPI SWI: Gold; RIAA: Gold; SNEP: Gold
Playing the Angel	Released: 17 October 2005; Label: Mute, Reprise; Formats: CD, LP, digital download	6	45	1	1	1	1	11	1	1	7	BPI: Gold; BVMI: 5× Gold; IFPI AUT: Gold; IFPI SWE: Gold; SNEP: Platinum
Sounds of the Universe	Released: 20 April 2009; Label: Mute; Formats: CD, CD/DVD, LP, digital download	2	32	1	2	1	1	7	1	1	3	BPI: Silver; BVMI: 3× Gold; FIMI: Platinum; IFPI AUT: Gold; IFPI SWE: Gold; IFPI SWI: Platinum; SNEP: Platinum
Delta Machine	Released: 25 March 2013; Labels: Columbia, Mute; Formats: CD, LP, digital download	2	16	1	2	1	1	3	1	1	6	BPI: Silver; BVMI: 3× Gold; FIMI: Platinum; IFPI AUT: Gold; IFPI SWE: Gold; IFPI SWI: Platinum; SNEP: Platinum
Spirit	Released: 17 March 2017; Labels: Columbia, Mute; Formats: CD, LP, digital download	5	14	1	1	1	1	4	3	1	5	BPI: Silver; BVMI: Gold; FIMI: Gold; IFPI SWI: Gold; SNEP: Platinum
Memento Mori	Released: 24 March 2023; Labels: Columbia, Mute; Formats: CD, LP, CS, digital download	2	36	1	1	1	1	3	1	1	14	BVMI: Gold; FIMI: Gold; SNEP: Gold
"—" denotes a recording that did not chart or was not released in that territory.

=== Live albums ===
List of live albums, with selected chart positions and certifications
Title	Details	Peak chart positions										Certifications
Title	Details	UK	AUS	AUT	FRA	GER	ITA	NLD	SWE	SWI	US	Certifications
101	Released: 13 March 1989; Label: Mute; Formats: CD, CS, LP	5	71	13	4	3	50	43	14	11	45	BPI: Gold; BVMI: Gold; RIAA: Gold; SNEP: 2× Gold
Songs of Faith and Devotion Live	Released: 6 December 1993; Label: Mute; Formats: CD, CS, LP	46	27	—	—	50	—	85	22	47	193	
Touring the Angel: Live in Milan	Released: 25 September 2006; Label: Mute; Formats: CD, digital download	—	—	—	—	2	—	—	—	54	—	BVMI: Gold
Tour of the Universe: Barcelona 20/21.11.09	Released: 5 November 2010; Label: Mute; Formats: CD, digital download	—	—	—	7	1	3	—	24	—	—	FIMI: Gold
Live in Berlin	Released: 17 November 2014; Label: Mute, Columbia; Formats: CD, digital download	64	—	13	9	2	11	36	22	13	—	
Live Spirits Soundtrack	Released: 26 June 2020; Label: Mute, Columbia; Formats: CD, digital download	—	—	4	4	1	7	16	—	6	—	
Memento Mori: Mexico City	Released: 5 December 2025; Label: Columbia; Formats: CD, digital download	22	—	1	—	1	6	26	10	2	—	
"—" denotes a recording that did not chart or was not released in that territory.

==== Live album series ====
List of live album series
Title	Details
Recording the Angel (Note: Recording the Angel and Recording the Universe were released a series of albums recorded live during the Touring the Angel and Tour of the Universe tours respectively.)	Released: 27 April 2006 – 1 August 2006; Label: Mute; Formats: CD, digital download
Recording the Universe	Released: 10 May 2009 – 27 February 2010; Label: Mute; Formats: CD, digital download

=== Compilation albums ===
List of compilation albums, with selected chart positions and certifications
Title	Details	Peak chart positions										Certifications
Title	Details	UK	AUS	AUT	FRA	GER	ITA	NLD	SWE	SWI	US	Certifications
People Are People	Released: 2 July 1984; Label: Sire; Formats: CD, CS, LP; Released only in North America	—	—	—	—	—	—	—	—	—	74	RIAA: Gold
The Singles 81→85	Released: 14 October 1985; Label: Mute; Formats: CD, CS, LP, MD; Released only in Europe	6	135	—	19	9	99	—	18	14	—	BPI: Gold; BVMI: Gold
Catching Up with Depeche Mode	Released: 11 November 1985; Label: Sire; Formats: CD, CS, LP; Released only in North America	—	—	—	—	—	—	—	—	—	113	RIAA: Platinum
The Singles 86>98	Released: 28 September 1998; Label: Mute; Formats: CD, CS, LP, MD	5	42	2	6	1	2	33	1	3	38	BPI: Gold; BVMI: Platinum; FIMI: Gold; IFPI SWE: Gold; IFPI SWI: Gold; NVPI: Gold; RIAA: Platinum; SNEP: 2× Gold
The Singles 81>85	Released: 26 October 1998; Label: Mute; Format: CD, CS, LP, MD	103	—	—	—	—	—	—	—	—	114	
The Singles 81>98	Released: 15 October 2001; Label: Mute; Format: CD	—	—	—	—	83	16	—	—	—	—	FIMI: Platinum
Remixes 81–04	Released: 25 October 2004; Label: Mute; Formats: CD, LP, digital download	24	—	38	4	2	6	68	16	7	—	BPI: Gold; BVMI: Platinum; SNEP: 2× Gold
The Best of Depeche Mode Volume 1	Released: 13 November 2006; Label: Mute; Formats: CD, LP, digital download	18	—	9	5	2	6	40	16	7	148	BPI: 2× Platinum; BVMI: 7× Gold; FIMI: Platinum; IFPI SWI: Gold; SNEP: Gold
Remixes 2: 81–11	Released: 6 June 2011; Label: Mute; Format: CD, LP, digital download	24	—	11	4	3	9	69	9	6	105	
"—" denotes a recording that did not chart or was not released in that territory.

=== Video albums ===
List of video albums, with selected chart positions and certifications
Title	Details	Peak chart positions		Certifications
Title	Details	UK Video	GER	Certifications
The World We Live In and Live in Hamburg	Released: 1985; Label: Virgin Video; Formats: VHS, Betamax, LaserDisc	57	—	
Some Great Videos	Released: 1985 (Europe) / 1986 (North America); Label: Virgin Video; Formats: VHS, Betamax, LaserDisc	11	—	RIAA: Gold
Strange	Released: 1988; Labels: Mute Film, Virgin Music Video; Formats: VHS, LaserDisc	8	—	RIAA: Gold
101	Released: 1989; Labels: Mute Film, Virgin Music Video; Formats: VHS, LaserDisc; Re-released: 10 November 2003; Labels: Mute Film, Virgin Music Video; Formats: DVD, UMD	6	32	BVMI: Gold; RIAA: Platinum
Strange Too	Released: 1990; Label: Mute Film, BMG Video; Formats: VHS, LaserDisc	12	—	RIAA: Platinum
Devotional	Released: 1993; Labels: Mute Film, BMG Video; Formats: VHS, LaserDisc; Re-released: 20 September 2004; Labels: Mute Film, BMG Video; Formats: DVD, UMD	18	25	BVMI: Gold
The Videos 86>98	Released: 1998; Label: Mute Film; Formats: VHS; Re-released: 20 March 2000; Label: Mute Film; Formats: DVD	13	—	
Some Great Videos 81>85	Released: 1998; Label: Mute Film; Formats: VHS	6	—	
One Night in Paris	Released: 27 May 2002; Label: Mute; Formats: VHS, DVD, UMD	4	54	BVMI: Platinum; RIAA: Gold
Videos 86>98 +	Released: 25 November 2002; Label: Mute; Formats: VHS, DVD	6	81	BVMI: Platinum; RIAA: Gold
Playing the Angel	Released: 17 October 2005; Label: Mute, Reprise; Formats: DVD	—	—	
Touring the Angel: Live in Milan	Released: 25 September 2006; Label: Mute; Formats: DVD	1	2	BVMI: 2× Platinum
The Best of Depeche Mode Volume 1	Released: 13 November 2006; Label: Mute; Formats: DVD	28	—	
Tour of the Universe: Barcelona 20/21.11.09	Released: 8 November 2010; Label: Mute; Formats: DVD, Blu-ray	2	1	BVMI: Platinum
Live in Berlin	Released: 17 November 2014; Labels: Columbia, Mute; Formats: DVD, digital download	64	2	
Video Singles Collection	Released: 18 November 2016; Labels: Columbia, Mute; Formats: DVD, digital download	4	6	
Spirits in the Forest	Released: 26 June 2020; Label: Columbia, Mute; Formats: DVD, Blu-ray, digital download	—	—	
Strange / Strange Too	Released: 8 December 2023; Label: Columbia, Rhino; Formats: DVD, Blu-ray	—	6	
Depeche Mode: M	Released: 5 December 2025; Label: Columbia; Formats: DVD, Blu-ray	—	—	
"—" denotes a recording that did not chart or was not released in that territory.

== Singles ==
=== 1980s ===
List of singles, with selected chart positions and certifications, showing year released and album name
Title	Year	Peak chart positions												Certifications	Album
Title	Year	UK	AUS	FRA	GER	IRL	ITA	NLD	SWE	SWI	US	US Alt.	US Dance	Certifications	Album
"Dreaming of Me"	1981	57	—	—	45 (Note: "Dreaming of Me" first charted in Germany in March 2011.)	—	—	—	—	—	—	—	47		Non-album single (Note: The non-fade-out version of "Dreaming of Me" appears on CD issues of Speak & Spell, despite being officially a non-album single.)
"New Life"	1981	11	—	—	—	22	—	—	—	—	—	—	29		Speak & Spell
"Just Can't Get Enough"	1981	8	4	31	—	16	—	10	14	—	—	—	26	BPI: 2× Platinum; BVMI: Gold; FIMI: Platinum; RIAA: Platinum	Speak & Spell
"See You"	1982	6	—	—	44	9	—	49	—	—	—	—	—	BPI: Silver	A Broken Frame
"The Meaning of Love"	1982	12	—	—	64	17	—	—	16	—	—	—	—		A Broken Frame
"Leave in Silence"	1982	18	—	—	58	13	—	—	17	—	—	—	—		A Broken Frame
"Get the Balance Right!"	1983	13	—	61	38	16	—	—	—	—	—	—	31		Non-album single
"Everything Counts"	1983	6	—	—	23	15	24	50	18	8	—	—	17	BPI: Silver	Construction Time Again
"Love, in Itself"	1983	21	—	—	28	27	—	1 (Note: In the Netherlands, "Love, in Itself" charted as an extended play and peaked at number one on the albums chart.)	—	—	—	—	—		Construction Time Again
"People Are People"	1984	4	25	48	1	2	21	8	15	4	13	—	44	BPI: Silver; RIAA: Gold	Some Great Reward
"Master and Servant"	1984	9	89	34	2	6	33	41	7	8	87	—	49		Some Great Reward
"Blasphemous Rumours" / "Somebody"	1984	16	87	68	22	8	—	34	—	19	—	—	—		Some Great Reward
"Shake the Disease"	1985	18	—	13	4	9	25	47	5	6	—	—	— (Note: "Shake the Disease" did not enter the Dance Club Songs chart, but it peaked at #33 on the Hot Dance/Disco 12-inch Singles Sales chart.)		The Singles 81→85
"It's Called a Heart"	1985	18	—	29	8	5	16	47	7	7	—	—	—		The Singles 81→85
"Stripped" / "But Not Tonight" (Note: In the United States, "But Not Tonight" was released as the A-side of the single to promote the film Modern Girls, with "Stripped" serving as the B-side.)	1986	15	—	39	4	6	21	—	9	8	—	—	—		Black Celebration
"A Question of Lust"	1986	28	—	57	8	13	—	19	17	12	—	—	—		Black Celebration
"A Question of Time"	1986	17	—	29	4	10	—	34	18	9	—	—	— (Note: "A Question of Time" did not enter the Dance Club Songs chart, but it peaked at #34 on the Hot Dance/Disco 12-inch Singles Sales chart.)		Black Celebration
"Strangelove"	1987	16	—	25	2	5	16	30	5	3	76	—	1	RIAA: Gold	Music for the Masses
"Never Let Me Down Again"	1987	22	82	29	2	12	12	80	7	7	63	—	12	BPI: Silver; RIAA: Gold	Music for the Masses
"Behind the Wheel"	1987	21	—	21	6	16	41	—	10	6	61 (Note: Radio stations in the U.S. preferred the medley on the B-side "Route 66/Behind the Wheel" which became the chart hit.)	—	3		Music for the Masses
"Little 15"	1988	60	—	93	16	—	—	—	—	18	—	—	—		Music for the Masses
"Strangelove '88"	1988	—	—	—	—	—	—	—	—	—	50	—	—		Music for the Masses
"Route 66"	1988	—	79 (Note: In Australia, "Route 66" charted in May 1988 as an A-side, with "Behind the Wheel" as the B-side (not AA-side).)	—	—	—	—	—	—	—	—	—	3		Non-album single
"Everything Counts" (live)	1989	22	—	29	12	17	35	89	—	18	—	13	16		101
"Personal Jesus"	1989	13	134	27	5	7	3	62	17	5	28	3	12	BPI: Platinum; BVMI: Gold; FIMI: Platinum; RIAA: 2× Platinum	Violator
"—" denotes a recording that did not chart or was not released in that territory.

=== 1990s ===
List of singles, with selected chart positions and certifications, showing year released and album name
Title	Year	Peak chart positions												Certifications	Album
Title	Year	UK	AUS	FIN	GER	IRL	ITA	SPA	SWE	SWI	US	US Alt.	US Dance	Certifications	Album
"Enjoy the Silence"	1990	6	71	3	2	3	5	1	5	2	8	1	6	BPI: 2× Platinum; BVMI: 3× Gold; FIMI: 2× Platinum; IFPI SWE: Gold; RIAA: 3× Platinum	Violator
"Policy of Truth"	1990	16	143	5	7	11	7	7	20	12	15	1	2	RIAA: Platinum	Violator
"World in My Eyes"	1990	17	153	4	7	7	28	2	—	5	52	17	6		Violator
"I Feel You"	1993	8	37	1	4	6	4	1	2	4	37	1	3	RIAA: Gold	Songs of Faith and Devotion
"Walking in My Shoes"	1993	14	74	7	14	15	9	6	8	26	69	1	— (Note: "Walking in My Shoes" did not enter the Dance Club Songs chart, but it peaked at #15 on the Hot Dance Music Maxi-Singles Sales chart.)		Songs of Faith and Devotion
"Condemnation"	1993	9	78	5	23	19	24	9	3	38	—	23	— (Note: "Walking in My Shoes" did not enter the Dance Club Songs chart, but it peaked at #36 on the Hot Dance Music Maxi-Singles Sales chart.)		Songs of Faith and Devotion
"In Your Room"	1994	8	40	2	24	15	25	4	2	14	—	—	—		Songs of Faith and Devotion
"Barrel of a Gun"	1997	4	33	3	3	13	4	1	1	30	47	11	— (Note: "Barrel of a Gun" did not enter the Dance Club Songs chart, but it peaked at #5 on the Hot Dance Music Maxi-Singles Sales chart.)	IFPI SWE: Gold	Ultra
"It's No Good"	1997	5	52	5	5	13	2	1	1	30	38	4	1	BPI: Silver; RIAA: Gold	Ultra
"Home"	1997	23	102	15	11	—	3	4	10	47	88	—	— (Note: The "Home" / "Useless" single did not enter the Dance Club Songs chart, but it peaked at #15 on the Hot Dance Music Maxi-Singles Sales chart.)		Ultra
"Useless"	1997	28	134	17	16	—	16	—	16	—	—	—	—		Ultra
"Only When I Lose Myself"	1998	17	34	4	2	28	4	1	4	16	61	36	— (Note: "Only When I Lose Myself" did not enter the Dance Club Songs chart, but it peaked at #2 on the Hot Dance Music Maxi-Singles Sales chart.)		The Singles 86>98
"—" denotes a recording that did not chart or was not released in that territory.

=== 2000s ===
List of singles, with selected chart positions, showing year released and album name
Title	Year	Peak chart positions												Certifications	Album
Title	Year	UK	AUT	FRA	GER	IRL	ITA	SPA	SWE	SWI	US	US Alt.	US Dance	Certifications	Album
"Dream On"	2001	6	9	12	1	24	1	1	4	13	85	12	1		Exciter
"I Feel Loved"	2001	12	44	39	9	27	5	4	16	64	—	—	1		Exciter
"Freelove"	2001	19	61	52	8	41	3	3	20	67	—	—	1		Exciter
"Goodnight Lovers"	2002	— (Note: "Goodnight Lovers" was deemed ineligible to enter the UK Singles Chart by the Official Charts Company, as rules at the time disqualified singles exceeding three tracks from entering the chart; it did, however, peak at number one on the UK Budget Albums Chart.)	—	64	15	—	16	4	33	69	—	—	—		Exciter
"Enjoy the Silence 04" (remixed by Mike Shinoda)	2004	7	48	15	5	40	10	4	31	44	—	—	25		Remixes 81–04
"Precious"	2005	4	9	32	2	12	1	1	1	12	71	23	1	BVMI: Gold; RIAA: Gold	Playing the Angel
"A Pain That I'm Used To"	2005	15	24	96	11	31	2	1	13	23	—	—	6		Playing the Angel
"Suffer Well"	2006	12	67	87	13	18	5	2	20	66	—	38	1		Playing the Angel
"John the Revelator" / "Lilian"	2006	18	—	—	16	22	16	2	19	70	—	—	38		Playing the Angel
"Martyr"	2006	13	31	64	2	32	1	1	10	17	—	—	22		The Best of Depeche Mode; Volume 1
"Wrong"	2009	24	12	10	2	34	8	41	5	16	—	12	1	BVMI: Gold	Sounds of the Universe
"Peace"	2009	57	72	18	25	—	45	—	59	53	—	—	—		Sounds of the Universe
"Fragile Tension" / "Hole to Feed"	2009	—	—	27	39	—	—	—	—	—	—	—	—		Sounds of the Universe
"—" denotes a recording that did not chart or was not released in that territory.

=== 2010s ===
List of singles, with selected chart positions and certifications, showing year released and album name
Title	Year	Peak chart positions											Certifications	Album
Title	Year	UK	AUT	BEL (WA)	FRA	GER	HUN	IRL	ITA	SWI	US Alt.	US Dance	Certifications	Album
"Personal Jesus 2011" (remixed by Stargate)	2011	119	73	43	91	36	5	—	—	73	—	— (Note: "Personal Jesus 2011" did not enter the Dance Club Songs chart, but it peaked at #3 on the Dance Singles Sales chart.)		Remixes 2: 81–11
"Heaven"	2013	60	22	12	27	2	1	84	19	18	33	1	FIMI: Gold	Delta Machine
"Soothe My Soul"	2013	88	—	— (Note: "Soothe My Soul" did not enter the Wallonie Ultratop 50, but peaked at number 9 on the Ultratip chart.)	45	22	1	—	67	—	27	7		Delta Machine
"Should Be Higher"	2013	81	60	—	58	19	11	—	—	61	—	— (Note: "Should Be Higher" did not enter the Dance Club Songs chart, but it peaked at #1 on the Dance Singles Sales chart.)		Delta Machine
"Where's the Revolution"	2017	— (Note: "Where's the Revolution" did not enter the UK Singles Chart, but peaked at number 65 on the UK Singles Sales Chart.)	—	— (Note: "Where's the Revolution" did not enter the Wallonie Ultratop 50, but peaked at number 13 on the Ultratip chart.)	22	29	3	—	—	57	40	—		Spirit
"Going Backwards"	2017	—	—	— (Note: "Going Backwards" did not enter the Wallonie Ultratop 50, but charted as an "extra tip" on the Ultratip chart.)	90	—	7	—	—	—	—	—		Spirit
"Cover Me"	2017	— (Note: "Cover Me" did not enter the UK Singles Chart, but peaked at number 88 on the UK Singles Sales Chart.)	—	— (Note: "Cover Me" did not enter the Wallonie Ultratop 50, but charted as an "extra tip" on the Ultratip chart.)	67	—	35	—	—	—	—	—		Spirit
"—" denotes a recording that did not chart or was not released in that territory.

=== 2020s ===
List of singles, with selected chart positions, showing year released and album name
Title	Year	Peak chart positions										Album
Title	Year	UK Sales	BEL (WA)	CAN DL	CZ	GER	HUN	POL	SK	SWI	US Alt.	Album
"Ghosts Again"	2023	14	42	24	63	28	2	22	42	79	9	Memento Mori
"My Cosmos Is Mine"	2023	32	—	—	—	— (Note: "My Cosmos Is Mine" did not enter the German Singles Chart, but peaked at number 16 on the Deutsche Download Singles Chart.)	—	—	—	—	—	Memento Mori
"Wagging Tongue"	2023	22	—	—	54	— (Note: "Wagging Tongue" did not enter the German Singles Chart, but peaked at number 20 on the Deutsche Single Trend Chart.)	—	—	—	—	—	Memento Mori
"Speak to Me"	2023	—	—	—	—	— (Note: "Speak to Me" did not enter the German Singles Chart, but peaked at number 21 on the Deutsche Download Singles Chart.)	—	—	—	—	—	Memento Mori
"My Favourite Stranger"	2023	19	—	—	—	— (Note: "My Favourite Stranger" did not enter the German Singles Chart, but peaked at number 17 on the Deutsche Download Singles Chart.)	—	—	—	—	—	Memento Mori
"Before We Drown"	2024	16	—	—	—	— (Note: "Before We Drown" did not enter the German Singles Chart, but peaked at number 35 on the Deutsche Download Singles Chart.)	—	—	—	—	—	Memento Mori
"People Are Good"	2024	52	—	—	—	— (Note: "People Are Good" did not enter the German Singles Chart, but peaked at number 12 on the Deutsche Download Singles Chart.)	—	—	—	—	—	Memento Mori
"—" denotes a recording that did not chart or was not released in that territory.

== Singles catalogue number chronology ==
Starting with their sixth single ("Leave in Silence"), most official European Depeche Mode single releases are chronologically ordered with a sequential number prefixed by the word "BONG", named after the bong water pipe used for smoking cannabis, which Gore had read about around the time of the single's release and found funny enough to make it the official catalogue designation for Depeche Mode's singles.

For example, the fifth Depeche Mode single to follow this pattern, "People Are People", is identified with the code "BONG5", printed on the single's cover, spine and on the record or CD itself. The "BONG" designation is preceded with numbers or letters that indicate the format of the release, such as "7" for a 7" single, "CD" for a CD-single, or "i" for an iTunes-only release. Additional letters such as "L" or "XL" denote a limited edition release. Promotional-only releases include a "P" prefix. For example, "PL12BONG37" indicates the limited, promotional-only 12" single release of "Suffer Well". This scheme was modified for one release: "Little 15" was labeled as "12 LITTLE 15" instead of being given a "BONG" designation. Some singles also had unique prefixes, such as the gatefold 7" single of "Personal Jesus", which was designated GBONG17.

The first five Depeche Mode singles did not use "BONG" and instead followed their label's "MUTE" single numbering scheme. Depeche Mode used the BONG numbering scheme until their departure from Mute Records after 2011.

Non-UK single releases (such as the US-only "Strangelove '88"), which were not given BONG designations, are omitted from the following list.

Speak & Spell era (1981)

- MUTE 13: "Dreaming of Me" (1981)
- MUTE 14: "New Life" (1981)
- MUTE 16: "Just Can't Get Enough" (1981)

A Broken Frame era (1982)

- MUTE 18: "See You" (1982)
- MUTE 22: "The Meaning of Love" (1982)
- BONG 1: "Leave in Silence" (1982)

Construction Time Again era (1983)

- BONG 2: "Get the Balance Right!" (1983)
- BONG 3: "Everything Counts" (1983)
- BONG 4: "Love, In Itself" (1983)

Some Great Reward era (1984)

- BONG 5: "People Are People" (1984)
- BONG 6: "Master and Servant" (1984)
- BONG 7: "Blasphemous Rumours" / "Somebody" (1984)

The Singles 81→85 era (1985)

- BONG 8: "Shake the Disease" (1985)
- BONG 9: "It's Called a Heart" (1985)

Black Celebration era (1986)

- BONG 10: "Stripped" (1986)
- BONG 11: "A Question of Lust" (1986)
- BONG 12: "A Question of Time" (1986)

Music for the Masses era (1987–1988)

- BONG 13: "Strangelove" (1987)
- BONG 14: "Never Let Me Down Again" (1987)
- BONG 15: "Behind The Wheel" (1987)
- LITTLE 15: "Little 15" (1988)

101 era (1989)

- BONG 16: "Everything Counts" (live) (1989)

Violator era (1989–1990)

- BONG 17: "Personal Jesus" (1989)
- BONG 18: "Enjoy the Silence" (1990)
- BONG 19: "Policy of Truth" (1990)
- BONG 20: "World in My Eyes" (1990)

Songs of Faith and Devotion era (1993–1994)

- BONG 21: "I Feel You" (1993)
- BONG 22: "Walking in My Shoes" (1993)
- BONG 23: "Condemnation" (1993)
- BONG 24: "In Your Room" (1994)

Ultra era (1997)

- BONG 25: "Barrel of a Gun" (1997)
- BONG 26: "It's No Good" (1997)
- BONG 27: "Home" (1997)
- BONG 28: "Useless" (1997)

The Singles 86>98 era (1998)

- BONG 29: "Only When I Lose Myself" (1998)

Exciter era (2001–2002)

- BONG 30: "Dream On" (2001)
- BONG 31: "I Feel Loved" (2001)
- BONG 32: "Freelove" (2001)
- BONG 33: "Goodnight Lovers" (2002)

Remixes 81–04 era (2004)

- BONG 34: "Enjoy the Silence 04" (2004)

Playing the Angel era (2005–2006)

- BONG 35: "Precious" (2005)
- BONG 36: "A Pain That I'm Used To" (2005)
- BONG 37: "Suffer Well" (2006)
- BONG 38: "John the Revelator" / "Lilian" (2006)

The Best of Depeche Mode Volume 1 era (2006)

- BONG 39: "Martyr" (2006)

Sounds of the Universe era (2009)

- BONG 40: "Wrong" (2009)
- BONG 41: "Peace" (2009)
- BONG 42: "Fragile Tension" / "Hole to Feed" (2009)

Remixes 2. 81–11 era (2011)

- BONG 43: "Personal Jesus 2011" (2011)

Delta Machine era (2013)

- BONG 44: "Heaven" (2023)
- BONG 45: "Soothe My Soul" (2023)
- BONG 46: "Should Be Higher" (2023)
  - These singles have BONG numerations only in their 2023 Mute/Columbia re-releases.

Spirit era (2017)

- BONG 47: "Where's the Revolution" (2024)
- BONG 48: "Going Backwards" (2024)
- BONG 49: "Cover Me" (2024)
  - These singles have BONG numerations only in their 2024 Mute/Columbia re-releases.

== Other charted songs ==
List of songs, with selected chart positions, showing year released and album name
Title	Year	Peak chart positions										Album
Title	Year	UK	AUS	BEL (WA) Tip	FIN	FRA	GER	SCO	SPA	US Alt.	US Dance	Album
"Something to Do"	1984	75 (Note: First charted in December 2004.)	—	—	—	—	—	89	—	—	—	Some Great Reward
"Dangerous"	1989	—	—	—	—	—	—	—	—	13	12	"Personal Jesus" single
"Halo"	1990	78 (Note: First charted in December 2004.)	—	—	—	—	—	100	—	21	—	Violator
"Condemnation" (live) (Note: The "Condemnation" (live) single charted separately to "Condemnation" in Australia.)	1993	—	187	—	—	—	—	—	—	—	—	Songs of Faith and Devotion Live
"The Darkest Star"	2006	132	—	—	16	—	—	71	—	—	—	Playing the Angel
"Perfect" (promotional single)	2009	—	—	—	—	—	—	—	—	—	1	Sounds of the Universe
"Oh Well"	2009	113	—	—	—	—	—	—	—	—	—	Sounds of the Universe
"Behind the Wheel 2011" (promotional single) (remixed by Vince Clarke)	2011	—	—	—	—	—	—	—	—	—	3	Remixes 2: 81–11
"All That's Mine"	2013	—	—	—	—	—	86	—	—	—	—	"Heaven" single
"Heaven" (Blawan remix)	2013	—	—	—	—	—	—	—	44	—	—	"Heaven" single
"Goodbye"	2013	—	—	42	—	—	—	—	—	—	—	Delta Machine
"So Much Love"	2017	—	—	—	—	182	—	—	—	—	—	Spirit
"In the End"	2025	— (Note: "In the End" did not enter the UK Singles Chart, but peaked at number 60 on the UK Singles Sales Chart.)	—	—	—	—	—	—	—	—	—	Memento Mori: Mexico City
"Universal Soldier"	2026	— (Note: "Universal Soldier" did not enter the UK Singles Chart, but peaked at number 65 on the UK Singles Sales Chart.)	—	—	—	—	—	—	—	—	—	Help(2)
"—" denotes a recording that did not chart or was not released in that territory.

== Box sets ==
List of box sets, with selected chart positions
Title	Details	Peak chart positions					
Title	Details	BEL (WA)	FRA	GER	SCO	SPA	SWI
X¹	Released: 21 April 1991; Label: WEA; Released only in Japan	—	—	—	—	—	—
X²	Released: 21 April 1991; Label: WEA; Released only in Japan	—	—	—	—	—	—
1 (Singles 1–6)	Released: 28 November 1991; Labels: Mute, Rhino, WEA; Re-released in 2004; Contains MUTE 13, 14, 16, 18, 22 & BONG 1	—	—	—	—	—	—
2 (Singles 7–12)	Released: 28 November 1991; Labels: Mute, Rhino, WEA; Re-released in 2004; Contains BONG 2–7	—	—	—	—	—	—
3 (Singles 13–18)	Released: 12 December 1991; Labels: Mute, Rhino, WEA; Re-released in 2004; Contains BONG 8–12 & LITTLE 15	—	—	—	—	—	—
4 (Singles 19–24)	Released: 30 March 2004; Labels: Mute, Rhino, WEA; Contains BONG 13–18	—	—	84	—	—	—
5 (Singles 25–30)	Released: 30 March 2004; Labels: Mute, Rhino, WEA; Contains BONG 19–24	—	—	85	—	—	—
6 (Singles 31–36)	Released: 30 March 2004; Labels: Mute, Rhino, WEA; Contains BONG 25–30	—	—	88	—	—	—
The Complete Depeche Mode	Released: 19 December 2006 (WW); Label: Mute; Format: Digital download	—	—	—	—	—	—
Speak & Spell: The 12″ Singles	Released: 31 August 2018; Labels: Mute, Columbia	—	—	10	—	34	—
A Broken Frame: The 12″ Singles	Released: 31 August 2018; Labels: Mute, Columbia	—	—	11	—	38	—
Construction Time Again: The 12″ Singles	Released: 14 December 2018; Labels: Mute, Columbia	—	—	55	—	—	—
Some Great Reward: The 12″ Singles	Released: 14 December 2018; Labels: Mute, Columbia	—	—	49	—	—	—
Black Celebration: The 12″ Singles	Released: 31 May 2019; Labels: Mute, Columbia	—	—	22	—	31	—
Music for the Masses: The 12″ Singles	Released: 31 May 2019; Labels: Mute, Columbia	—	—	20	—	44	60
Mode	Released: 24 January 2020; Labels: Mute, Columbia	140	175	10	—	21	—
Violator: The 12″ Singles	Released: 17 July 2020; Labels: Mute, Columbia	—	—	9	57	62	—
Songs of Faith of Devotion: The 12″ Singles	Released: 30 October 2020; Labels: Mute, Columbia	—	—	16	—	35	—
Ultra: The 12″ Singles	Released: 10 September 2021; Labels: Mute, Columbia	—	—	5	—	54	—
Exciter: The 12″ Singles	Released: 10 June 2022; Labels: Mute, Columbia	—	191	11	—	69	33
Playing the Angel: The 12″ Singles	Released: 11 November 2022; Labels: Mute, Columbia	—	—	16	—	68	—
Sounds of the Universe: The 12″ Singles	Released: 4 August 2023; Labels: Mute, Columbia	—	—	8	—	—	—
Delta Machine: The 12″ Singles	Released: 6 October 2023; Labels: Mute, Columbia	—	—	12	—	—	53
Spirit: The 12″ Singles	Released: 20 September 2024; Labels: Mute, Columbia	—	—	7	—	—	48
"—" denotes a recording that did not chart or was not released in that territory.

== Music videos ==
List of music videos, showing year released and directors
Title	Year	Director(s)
"Just Can't Get Enough"	1981	Clive Richardson
"See You"	1982	Julien Temple
"The Meaning of Love"	1982	Julien Temple
"Leave in Silence"	1982	Julien Temple
"Get the Balance Right!"	1983	Kevin Hewitt
"Everything Counts"	1983	Clive Richardson
"Love, in Itself"	1983	Clive Richardson
"People Are People"	1984	Clive Richardson
"People Are People" (Different mix)	1984	Clive Richardson
"Master and Servant"	1984	Clive Richardson
"Blasphemous Rumours"	1984	Clive Richardson
"Somebody"	1984	Clive Richardson
"Shake the Disease"	1985	Peter Care
"It's Called a Heart"	1985	Peter Care
"Stripped"	1986	Peter Care
"But Not Tonight" (version 1)	1986	Tamra Davis
"But Not Tonight" (version 2)	1986	Tamra Davis
"A Question of Lust"	1986	Clive Richardson
"A Question of Time"	1986	Anton Corbijn
"Strangelove"	1987	Anton Corbijn
"Never Let Me Down Again"	1987	Anton Corbijn
"Never Let Me Down Again" (Split mix)	1987	Anton Corbijn
"Behind the Wheel"	1987	Anton Corbijn
"Behind the Wheel" (remix)	1987	Anton Corbijn
"Pimpf"	1987	Anton Corbijn
"Little 15"	1988	Martyn Atkins
"Strangelove '88"	1988	Martyn Atkins
"Everything Counts" (live)	1989	D. A. Pennebaker
"Personal Jesus"	1989	Anton Corbijn
"Enjoy the Silence"	1990	Anton Corbijn
"Policy of Truth"	1990	Anton Corbijn
"World in My Eyes" (version 1)	1990	Anton Corbijn
"World in My Eyes" (version 2)	1990	Anton Corbijn
"Halo"	1990	Anton Corbijn
"Clean"	1990	Anton Corbijn
"I Feel You"	1993	Anton Corbijn
"Walking in My Shoes"	1993	Anton Corbijn
"Condemnation" (Paris mix)	1993	Anton Corbijn
"Condemnation" (live)	1993	Anton Corbijn
"Personal Jesus" (live)	1993	Anton Corbijn
"Enjoy the Silence" (live)	1993	Anton Corbijn
"Halo" (live)	1993	Anton Corbijn
"One Caress"	1993	Kevin Kerslake
"In Your Room"	1994	Anton Corbijn
"Barrel of a Gun"	1997	Anton Corbijn
"It's No Good"	1997	Anton Corbijn
"Home"	1997	Steven Green
"Useless"	1997	Anton Corbijn
"Only When I Lose Myself"	1998	Brian Griffin
"Dream On"	2001	Stéphane Sednaoui
"I Feel Loved"	2001	John Hillcoat
"I Feel Loved" (Dan-O-Rama remix)	2001	John Hillcoat
"I Feel Loved" (live)	2001	Anton Corbijn
"Freelove"	2001	John Hillcoat
"Freelove" (live)	2001	Anton Corbijn
"Goodnight Lovers"	2002	John Hillcoat
"Enjoy the Silence '04"	2004	Uwe Flade
"Precious"	2005	Uwe Flade
"A Pain That I'm Used To"	2005	Uwe Flade
"Suffer Well"	2006	Anton Corbijn
"John the Revelator"	2006	Blue Leach
"Martyr"	2006	Robert Chandler
"Wrong"	2009	Patrick Daughters
"Peace"	2009	Jonas & François
"Hole to Feed"	2009	Eric Wareheim
"Fragile Tension"	2009	Barney Steel & Robert Chandler
"Personal Jesus 2011"	2011	Patrick Daughters
"Heaven"	2013	Timothy Saccenti
"Soothe My Soul"	2013	Warren Fu
"Should Be Higher" (live)	2013	Anton Corbijn
"Where's the Revolution"	2017	Anton Corbijn
"Going Backwards"	2017	Timothy Saccenti
"Going Backwards" (360° version)	2017	Timothy Saccenti
"Heroes"	2017	Timothy Saccenti
"Cover Me"	2017	Anton Corbijn
"Ghosts Again"	2023	Anton Corbijn
"Wagging Tongue"	2023	The Sacred Egg
"My Favourite Stranger"	2023	Anton Corbijn
"Before We Drown"	2024	Anton Corbijn
"People Are Good"	2024	Rich Hall

== Interludes ==
Several of Depeche Mode's albums have included short unlisted or hidden tracks.

- Construction Time Again ends with a reprise of "Everything Counts".
- Music for the Masses ends with "Interlude #1 (Mission Impossible)".
- Violator includes "Interlude #2 (Crucified)" and "Interlude #3".
- Songs of Faith and Devotion includes "Interlude #4", an excerpt from the Brian Eno "Swamp" mix of "I Feel You".
- Ultra ends with "Junior Painkiller", a short excerpt from "Painkiller", the B-side to "Barrel of a Gun".
- Sounds of the Universe ends with "Interlude #5", a reprise of "Wrong".

== Other appearances ==
List of original tracks, (initially) not available on a Depeche Mode release
Title	Year	Original appearance	Writer(s)
"Photographic" (Some Bizzare version)	1981	Some Bizzare Album	Vince Clarke
"Sometimes I Wish I Was Dead" (Note: Sometimes known as the "FlexiPop! mix". Note transposed "Sometimes I" and "I Sometimes" (on the album version published a month later).)	1981	Flexipop! 11	Vince Clarke
"Dressed in Black" (Record Mirror version)	1986	The RM EP	Martin Gore
"Route 66" (The Nile Rodgers mix)	1988	Earth Girls Are Easy soundtrack	Bobby Troup
"Death's Door" (original recording)	1991	Until the End of the World soundtrack	Martin Gore
"Shake the Disease" (Tiga remix)	2006	Future Retro	Martin Gore
"Suffer Well" (Simlish version)	2006	The Sims 2: Open for Business (NB. computer game only, not released as a soundtrack)	Dave Gahan, Christian Eigner, Andrew Phillpott
"So Cruel"	2011	AHK-toong BAY-bi Covered	U2 (music), Bono (lyrics)
"4′33″"	2019	STUMM433	John Cage
"Universal Soldier"	2026	HELP(2)	Buffy Sainte-Marie

== Bibliography ==
- Burmeister, Dennis; Lange, Sascha (2017). Depeche Mode: Monument. New York: Akashic Books. ISBN 978-1-61775-593-4.
