= Broken =

Broken may refer to:

- Damage

== Literature ==
- Broken (Armstrong novel), a 2006 novel by Kelley Armstrong in the Women of the Otherworld series
- Broken (Slaughter novel), a 2010 novel by Karin Slaughter

== Music ==
=== Albums ===
- Broken (And Other Rogue States), a 2005 album by Luke Doucet
- Broken (MBLAQ EP) (2014)
- Broken (Nine Inch Nails EP), (1992)
- Broken (Soulsavers album) (2009)
- Broken (Straight Faced album) (1996)

=== Songs ===
- "Broken" (Jake Bugg song) (2013)
- "Broken" (Sam Clark song) (2009)
- "Broken" (Coldplay song) (2019)
- "Broken" (Elisa song) (2003)
- "Broken" (Lifehouse song) (2008)
- "Broken" (lovelytheband song) (2017)
- "Broken" (Kate Ryan song) (2011)
- "Broken" (Seether song) (2004)
- "Broken" (Slander and Kompany song) (2019)
- "Broken", by 12 Stones from 12 Stones
- "Broken", by All That Remains from Victim of the New Disease
- "Broken", by David Archuleta from Begin
- "Broken", by Bad Religion from The Process of Belief
- "Broken", by Bullet for My Valentine from Venom
- "Broken", by Tracy Chapman from Let It Rain
- "Broken", by Daley
- "Broken", by Depeche Mode from Delta Machine
- "Broken", by The Devil Wears Prada from Color Decay
- "Broken", by Bruce Dickinson from The Best of Bruce Dickinson
- "Broken", by Robert Downey Jr. from The Futurist
- "Broken", by Everclear from Welcome to the Drama Club
- "Broken", by Falling in Reverse from Coming Home
- "Broken", by Firewind from Days of Defiance
- "Broken", by Jess Glynne from Always In Between
- "Broken", by Gorillaz from Plastic Beach
- "Broken", by The Guess Who from "Albert Flasher"
- "Broken", by Lindsey Haun from the film Broken Bridges
- "Broken", by Jack Johnson from Sing-A-Longs and Lullabies, Soundtrack for the Film Curious George
- "Broken", by Ella Langley from Dandelion
- "Broken", by Late of the Pier from Fantasy Black Channel
- "Broken", by Leatherface from The Stormy Petrel
- "Broken", by Leona Lewis from Echo
- "Broken", by Madonna, recorded for Celebration but released separately
- "Broken", by McLean
- "Broken", by Nate Haller from Party in the Back
- "Broken", by Tift Merritt from Another Country
- "Broken", by Novembers Doom from To Welcome the Fade
- "Broken", by Kim Petras from Clarity
- "Broken", by Kelly Rowland from Ms. Kelly, later re-issues
- "Broken", by Sentenced from Crimson
- "Broken", by Shadow Gallery from Tyranny
- "Broken", by Sonata Arctica from Winterheart's Guild
- "Broken", by Stratovarius from Survive
- "Broken", by Stream of Passion from Darker Days
- "Broken", by Tears for Fears from Songs from the Big Chair
- "Broken", by UNKLE featuring Gavin Clark from War Stories

== Film ==
- Broken (1993 film), an American long-form music video
- Broken (2005 film), an American short film
- Broken (2006 film), an American drama film by Alan White
- Broken, a 2006 film broadcast by Horror Channel
- Broken (2012 film), a British coming-of-age drama film by Rufus Norris
- Broken (2013 film), a Nigerian drama film by Bright Wonder Obasi
- Broken (2014 film), a South Korean revenge thriller film by Lee Jung-ho
- Broken (2023 film), a Dutch drama film by Ben Verbong

== Television ==
- Broken (American TV program), a 2019 American investigative documentary television program
- Broken (British TV series), a 2017 British television drama series
- "Broken" (CSI: Miami), an episode of CSI: Miami
- "Broken" (House), an episode of House
- "Broken" (Once Upon a Time), an episode of Once Upon a Time

== See also ==
- Broken Bow (disambiguation)
- Broken English (disambiguation)
- Broken Heart (disambiguation)
- Broken River (disambiguation)
- Broken Wings (disambiguation)
- The Broken (disambiguation)
