= The Delta Machine Tour =

2013–14 concert tour by Depeche Mode

- Tour by Depeche Mode
- Location: Europe; Asia; North America
- Associated album: Delta Machine
- Start date: 4 May 2013
- End date: 7 March 2014
- Legs: 6
- No. of shows: 2 in Asia; 81 in Europe; 24 in North America; 107 in total
- Box office: $149.8 million

Depeche Mode concert chronology
- Tour of the Universe (2009–10); The Delta Machine Tour (2013–14); Global Spirit Tour (2017–18)

The Delta Machine Tour was a 2013–14 worldwide concert tour by English electronic music band Depeche Mode in support of the group's 13th studio album, Delta Machine, released 22 March 2013. Following a warm-up show in Nice, France on 4 May 2013, the tour kicked off in Tel Aviv, Israel, and continued through Europe until late July. A North American tour followed in late August, beginning in the Detroit suburb of Clarkston, Michigan and culminating in Austin, Texas in early October. The band performed at the Austin City Limits Music Festival, which in 2013 was held across two weekends for the first time. A second leg in Europe went from 3 November Abu Dhabi to 7 March 2014 Moscow. Among the dates were Dublin, Amsterdam, Oslo and Belfast, their first shows in Northern Ireland in almost 30 years.

The 25 and 27 November 2013 nights in Berlin were filmed by Anton Corbijn and recorded for the CD/DVD release Live in Berlin, released 17 November 2014.

The Delta Machine Tour was the 9th highest-grossing tour of 2013.

== Critical reception ==
Reviews of the tour were mixed. A review of the 7 May show in Tel Aviv was positive, citing an excited crowd and a strong performance from lead singer Dave Gahan "who held the crowd in sway the whole time with his deep baritone and slow-grind dance moves." A review of the 9 July show in Switzerland was negative, reading, "Depeche Mode fans deserve something better." The show was well-attended, but the performance itself was reviewed poorly due to "mundane" backing projections, a lack of stage props and reliance on Gahan, who was described as "Freddie Mercury reincarnated as a seahorse." The review rates the show 2 stars out of 4 ("average"). A review of the 27 July show in Vilnius was especially positive, starting from the very title "Crowd of Many Thousands Raged at Depeche Mode's Concert" and emphasizing the crowd's excitement during "Enjoy the Silence", "Personal Jesus", "Just Can't Get Enough", "I Feel You" and "Never Let Me Down Again". A review of the 20 September show in Dallas praised Gahan's vocals, reading, "Gahan's oily baritone is the firm anchor for Depeche Mode's sleek, rhythmic songs, which came across more nuanced and vibrant than might be expected in a live setting." A review of the 8 October show in Phoenix was very positive for both Gahan and Martin Gore, reading, "As brilliant a job as Gahan does at making the spotlight feel wanted, the concert retained its momentum when he left the stage, allowing Gore an opportunity to be the front man."

== Setlist ==
1. Intro (excerpt from "Welcome to My World")
2. "Welcome to My World"
3. "Angel"
4. "Walking in My Shoes"
  - "In Your Room" (Zephyr mix)
5. "Precious"
6. "Black Celebration"
  - "Behind the Wheel"
  - "Stripped"
7. "Policy of Truth"
  - "World in My Eyes"
  - "Should Be Higher"
  - "In Your Room" (Zephyr mix)
8. "Should Be Higher"
  - "Policy of Truth"
  - "In Your Room" (Zephyr mix)
9. "Barrel of a Gun"
  - "John the Revelator"
10. Song performed by Martin Gore
  - "Higher Love"
  - "Only When I Lose Myself"
  - "The Child Inside"
  - "When the Body Speaks" (acoustic version)
  - "Shake the Disease" (acoustic)
  - "Judas" (acoustic)
  - "Slow" (acoustic)
  - "Blue Dress" (acoustic)
11. Song performed by Martin Gore
  - "When the Body Speaks" (acoustic version)
  - "The Child Inside"
  - "But Not Tonight" (acoustic)
  - "Judas" (acoustic)
  - "Home" (acoustic)
  - "Shake the Disease" (acoustic)
  - "Slow" (acoustic)
  - "Blue Dress" (acoustic)
12. "Heaven"
13. "Soothe My Soul"
  - "Behind the Wheel"
14. "A Pain That I'm Used To" (Jacques Lu Cont remix)
  - "John the Revelator"
15. "A Question of Time"
  - "Soft Touch/Raw Nerve"
16. "Secret to the End"
  - "In Your Room"
17. "Enjoy the Silence"
18. "Personal Jesus"
19. "Goodbye"
20. Song performed by Martin Gore
  - "Home" (acoustic)
  - "Somebody"
  - "A Question of Lust"
  - "But Not Tonight" (acoustic)
  - "Condemnation" (acoustic)
  - "Leave in Silence" (acoustic)
21. "Halo" (Goldfrapp remix)
  - Song performed by Martin Gore
    - "Condemnation" (acoustic)
22. "Just Can't Get Enough"
23. "I Feel You"
24. "Never Let Me Down Again"
25. "Goodbye"

== Shows ==
List of concerts, showing date, city, country, venue, tickets sold, number of available tickets and amount of gross revenue.
| Date | City | Country | Venue | Attendance | Revenue |
Europe
| 4 May 2013 | Nice | France | Palais Nikaïa | 9,904 / 9,904 | $678,141 |
Asia
| 7 May 2013 | Tel Aviv | Israel | Yarkon Park | 19,325 / 19,325 | $1,752,446 |
Europe
| 10 May 2013 | Athens | Greece | Terra Vibe Park | 26,283 / 26,283 | $1,246,101 |
| 12 May 2013 | Sofia | Bulgaria | Lokomotiv Stadium | 18,892 / 26,300 | $926,320 |
| 15 May 2013 | Bucharest | Romania | Arena Națională | 34,729 / 35,400 | $1,797,985 |
| 19 May 2013 | Belgrade | Serbia | Park Ušće | 27,198 / 27,198 | $1,081,965 |
| 21 May 2013 | Budapest | Hungary | Ferenc Puskás Stadium | 33,200 / 33,200 | $1,899,677 |
| 23 May 2013 | Zagreb | Croatia | Arena Zagreb | 15,969 / 15,969 | $959,845 |
| 25 May 2013 | Bratislava | Slovakia | Štadión Pasienky | 29,112 / 29,112 | $2,066,297 |
| 28 May 2013 | London | England | The O_{2} Arena | 32,434 / 34,818 | $2,244,220 |
| 29 May 2013 | London | England | The O_{2} Arena | 32,434 / 34,818 | $2,244,220 |
| 1 June 2013 | Munich | Germany | Olympic Stadium | 62,976 / 62,976 | $4,956,599 |
| 3 June 2013 | Stuttgart | Germany | Mercedes-Benz Arena | 36,225 / 36,225 | $2,891,300 |
| 5 June 2013 | Frankfurt | Germany | Commerzbank-Arena | 40,960 / 40,960 | $3,295,523 |
| 7 June 2013 | Bern | Switzerland | Stade de Suisse | 39,241 / 39,241 | $4,013,227 |
| 9 June 2013 | Berlin | Germany | Olympic Stadium | 66,388 / 66,388 | $5,113,262 |
| 11 June 2013 | Leipzig | Germany | Red Bull Arena | 43,816 / 43,816 | $3,466,135 |
| 13 June 2013 | Copenhagen | Denmark | Parken Stadium | 40,725 / 40,725 | $3,792,609 |
| 15 June 2013 | Saint-Denis | France | Stade de France | 67,103 / 67,103 | $5,332,840 |
| 17 June 2013 | Hamburg | Germany | Imtech Arena | 44,128 / 44,128 | $3,533,609 |
| 22 June 2013 | Moscow | Russia | Lokomotiv Stadium | 27,886 / 27,886 | $3,307,759 |
| 24 June 2013 | Saint Petersburg | Russia | SKK Peterburgsky | 22,502 / 22,502 | $2,770,364 |
| 27 June 2013 | Stockholm | Sweden | Ericsson Globe | 11,348 / 11,348 | $859,932 |
| 29 June 2013 | Kyiv | Ukraine | NSC Olimpiyskiy | 36,562 / 38,640 | $2,928,368 |
| 3 July 2013 | Düsseldorf | Germany | Esprit Arena | 87,308 / 87,308 | $7,012,140 |
| 5 July 2013 | Düsseldorf | Germany | Esprit Arena | 87,308 / 87,308 | $7,012,140 |
| 7 July 2013 (Note: The 7 July 2013 concert in Werchester, Belgium was a part of the Rock Werchter festival.) | Werchter | Belgium | Werchter Festivalpark | —N/a | —N/a |
| 9 July 2013 (Note: The 9 July 2013 concert in Locarno, Switzerland was a part of the Moon & Stars Festival.) | Locarno | Switzerland | Piazza Grande Locarno | —N/a | —N/a |
| 11 July 2013 (Note: The 11 July 2013 concert in Bilbao, Spain was a part of the Bilbao BBK Live music festival.) | Bilbao | Spain | Monte Cobetas | —N/a | —N/a |
| 13 July 2013 (Note: The 13 July 2013 concert in Oeiras, Portugal was a part of the Optimus Alive! festival.) | Oeiras | Portugal | Passeio Marítimo de Algés | —N/a | —N/a |
| 16 July 2013 | Nîmes | France | Arena of Nîmes | —N/a | —N/a |
| 18 July 2013 | Milan | Italy | San Siro | 57,919 / 57,919 | $3,113,844 |
| 20 July 2013 | Rome | Italy | Stadio Olimpico | 56,007 / 56,007 | $3,077,983 |
| 23 July 2013 | Prague | Czechia | Eden Arena | 33,297 / 33,297 | $2,222,328 |
| 25 July 2013 | Warsaw | Poland | National Stadium | 53,181 / 53,181 | $2,894,152 |
| 27 July 2013 | Vilnius | Lithuania | Vingio Parko Estrada | 23,794 / 23,794 | $1,580,333 |
| 29 July 2013 | Minsk | Belarus | Minsk-Arena | 12,979 / 12,979 | $1,269,457 |
North America
| 22 August 2013 | Clarkston | United States | DTE Energy Music Theatre | 11,978 / 11,978 | $534,980 |
| 24 August 2013 | Tinley Park | United States | First Midwest Bank Amphitheatre | 22,773 / 22,773 | $1,066,824 |
| 27 August 2013 (Note: The 27 August 2013 in Falcon Heights, Minnesota was a part of the Minnesota State Fair.) | Falcon Heights | United States | Minnesota State Fair Grandstand | 7,693 / 7,693 | $497,172 |
| 30 August 2013 | Atlantic City | United States | Ovation Hall | 3,803 / 3,803 | $358,252 |
| 1 September 2013 | Toronto | Canada | Molson Canadian Amphitheatre | 16,110 / 16,110 | $956,300 |
| 3 September 2013 | Montreal | Canada | Bell Centre | 10,880 / 10,880 | $977,570 |
| 6 September 2013 | Brooklyn | United States | Barclays Center | 14,725 / 14,725 | $1,303,305 |
| 8 September 2013 | Wantagh | United States | Nikon at Jones Beach Theater | 12,907 / 12,907 | $825,055 |
| 10 September 2013 | Bristow | United States | Jiffy Lube Live | 11,041 / 11,041 | $574,953 |
| 12 September 2013 | Atlanta | United States | Aaron's Amphitheatre at Lakewood | 9,868 / 9,868 | $434,630 |
| 14 September 2013 | Tampa | United States | MidFlorida Credit Union Amphitheatre | 12,364 / 12,364 | $526,038 |
| 15 September 2013 | Sunrise | United States | BB&T Center | 10,760 / 10,760 | $683,192 |
| 18 September 2013 | The Woodlands | United States | Cynthia Woods Mitchell Pavilion | 14,842 / 14,842 | $815,614 |
| 20 September 2013 | Dallas | United States | Gexa Energy Pavilion | 16,220 / 16,220 | $792,656 |
| 22 September 2013 | Chula Vista | United States | Sleep Train Amphitheatre | 19,405 / 19,405 | $1,019,015 |
| 24 September 2013 | Santa Barbara | United States | Santa Barbara Bowl | 4,949 / 4,959 | $447,217 |
| 26 September 2013 | Mountain View | United States | Shoreline Amphitheatre | 19,192 / 19,192 | $837,827 |
| 28 September 2013 | Los Angeles | United States | Staples Center | 43,957 / 43,957 | $4,255,118 |
| 29 September 2013 | Los Angeles | United States | Staples Center | 43,957 / 43,957 | $4,255,118 |
| 2 October 2013 | Los Angeles | United States | Staples Center | 43,957 / 43,957 | $4,255,118 |
| 4 October 2013 (Note: The 4–11 October 2013 concerts in Austin, Texas were a part of the Austin City Limits Music Festival.) | Austin | United States | Zilker Metropolitan Park | —N/a | —N/a |
| 6 October 2013 | Paradise | United States | Pearl Concert Theater | 2,549 / 2,549 | $426,876 |
| 8 October 2013 | Phoenix | United States | Ak-Chin Pavilion | 11,698 / 11,698 | $520,425 |
| 11 October 2013 | Austin | United States | Zilker Metropolitan Park | —N/a | —N/a |
Asia
| 3 November 2013 (Note: The 3 November 2013 concert in Abu Dhabi, UAE was a part of the 2013 Abu Dhabi Grand Prix.) | Abu Dhabi | United Arab Emirates | du Arena | —N/a | —N/a |
Europe
| 7 November 2013 | Belfast | Northern Ireland | Odyssey Arena | 5,767 / 5,767 | $413,820 |
| 9 November 2013 | Dublin | Ireland | The O_{2} | 13,005 / 13,005 | $1,248,337 |
| 11 November 2013 | Glasgow | Scotland | SSE Hydro | 8,739 / 8,739 | $564,206 |
| 13 November 2013 | Leeds | England | First Direct Arena | 7,565 / 7,565 | $523,669 |
| 15 November 2013 | Manchester | England | Phones 4 U Arena | 11,816 / 11,816 | $827,673 |
| 19 November 2013 | London | England | The O_{2} Arena | 15,953 / 15,953 | $1,127,258 |
| 21 November 2013 | Cologne | Germany | Lanxess Arena | 15,673 / 15,673 | $1,414,404 |
| 23 November 2013 | Hanover | Germany | TUI Arena | 12,561 / 12,561 | $1,114,647 |
| 25 November 2013 | Berlin | Germany | O_{2} World | 28,332 / 28,332 | $2,455,660 |
| 27 November 2013 | Berlin | Germany | O_{2} World | 28,332 / 28,332 | $2,455,660 |
| 29 November 2013 | Herning | Denmark | Jyske Bank Boxen | 13,387 / 13,387 | $1,314,297 |
| 1 December 2013 | Erfurt | Germany | Messehalle | 12,300 / 12,300 | $1,109,288 |
| 3 December 2013 | Bremen | Germany | ÖVB Arena | 11,949 / 11,949 | $1,053,666 |
| 5 December 2013 | Oberhausen | Germany | König Pilsener Arena | 11,938 / 11,938 | $1,045,625 |
| 7 December 2013 | Amsterdam | Netherlands | Ziggo Dome | 16,750 / 16,750 | $1,453,121 |
| 9 December 2013 | Malmö | Sweden | Malmö Arena | 6,946 / 6,946 | $619,829 |
| 11 December 2013 | Gothenburg | Sweden | Scandinavium | 8,785 / 8,785 | $803,454 |
| 13 December 2013 | Oslo | Norway | Telenor Arena | 12,743 / 12,743 | $1,238,945 |
| 15 December 2013 | Helsinki | Finland | Hartwall Areena | 10,232 / 10,232 | $922,858 |
| 15 January 2014 | Barcelona | Spain | Palau Sant Jordi | 18,127 / 18,127 | $1,346,629 |
| 17 January 2014 | Madrid | Spain | Palacio de Deportes | 32,270 / 32,270 | $2,351,081 |
| 18 January 2014 | Madrid | Spain | Palacio de Deportes | 32,270 / 32,270 | $2,351,081 |
| 21 January 2014 | Montpellier | France | Park&Suites Arena | 12,486 / 12,486 | $892,108 |
| 23 January 2014 | Lyon | France | Halle Tony Garnier | 15,545 / 15,545 | $1,048,621 |
| 25 January 2014 | Antwerp | Belgium | Sportpaleis | 21,024 / 21,024 | $1,734,868 |
| 27 January 2014 | Birmingham | England | LG Arena | 11,780 / 11,780 | $865,531 |
| 29 January 2014 | Paris | France | Palais Omnisports de Paris-Bercy | 33,132 / 33,132 | $2,351,239 |
| 31 January 2014 | Paris | France | Palais Omnisports de Paris-Bercy | 33,132 / 33,132 | $2,351,239 |
| 2 February 2014 | Strasbourg | France | Zénith de Strasbourg | 12,025 / 12,025 | $858,597 |
| 4 February 2014 | Mannheim | Germany | SAP Arena | 11,280 / 11,280 | $1,012,272 |
| 6 February 2014 | Bratislava | Slovakia | Ondrej Nepela Arena | 10,149 / 10,149 | $1,051,319 |
| 8 February 2014 | Vienna | Austria | Wiener Stadthalle | 13,645 / 13,645 | $1,135,251 |
| 10 February 2014 | Prague | Czechia | O_{2} Arena | 18,033 / 18,033 | $1,188,844 |
| 12 February 2014 | Dresden | Germany | Messehallen Dresden | 12,280 / 12,280 | $1,088,710 |
| 14 February 2014 | Zürich | Switzerland | Hallenstadion | 24,436 / 24,436 | $2,388,629 |
| 15 February 2014 | Zürich | Switzerland | Hallenstadion | 24,436 / 24,436 | $2,388,629 |
| 18 February 2014 | Turin | Italy | Torino Palasport Olimpico | 11,697 / 11,697 | $839,308 |
| 20 February 2014 | Assago | Italy | Mediolanum Forum | 11,239 / 11,239 | $859,476 |
| 22 February 2014 | Casalecchio di Reno | Italy | Unipol Arena | 12,833 / 12,833 | $981,579 |
| 24 February 2014 | Łódź | Poland | Atlas Arena | 15,764 / 15,764 | $1,238,986 |
| 28 February 2014 | Minsk | Belarus | Minsk-Arena | 11,544 / 11,544 | $1,120,699 |
| 2 March 2014 | Riga | Latvia | Arena Riga | 11,615 / 11,615 | $838,208 |
| 4 March 2014 | Saint Petersburg | Russia | SKK Peterburgsky | 18,848 / 18,848 | $1,884,045 |
| 7 March 2014 | Moscow | Russia | Olimpiyskiy | 23,531 / 23,531 | $2,685,552 |
| Total | | | | 1,976,829 / 1,983,635 | $148,037,231 |

== Musicians ==
=== Depeche Mode ===
- Dave Gahan – lead vocals
- Martin Gore – guitar, synthesizers, lead and backing vocals
- Andy Fletcher – synthesizers

=== Additional musicians ===
- Peter Gordeno – synthesizers, samples, bass guitar, backing vocals
- Christian Eigner – drums, synthesizers
