= Live in Berlin (Depeche Mode album and video) =

2014 video album by Depeche Mode

Video by Depeche Mode
- Released: 14 November 2014
- Recorded: 25 and 27 November 2013
- Venue: O2 World (Berlin, Germany)
- Length: 129 minutes
- Label: Mute; Columbia
- Director: Anton Corbijn
- Producer: Kirsten Sohrauer

Depeche Mode chronology
Tour of the Universe: Barcelona 20/21.11.09 (2010)	Live in Berlin (2014)	Video Singles Collection (2016)

Live in Berlin: A Film by Anton Corbijn is a live video album by English electronic music band Depeche Mode, featuring a live concert directed and filmed by Anton Corbijn. It was released on 14 November 2014 by Mute Records and Columbia Records. It was filmed on location at the O2 World in Berlin on 25 and 27 November 2013 during the band's Delta Machine Tour.

The deluxe edition in five discs includes the Live in Berlin DVD, the Live in Berlin Soundtrack concert audio on two CDs, second DVD Alive in Berlin, and the 2013 album Delta Machine 5.1 mix on Blu-ray. The standard edition consists of the concert DVD and the soundtrack. The second DVD featuring the full live show combined with behind-the-scenes footage, interviews with the band and their fans, and a two-song acoustic session filmed at Salon Bel Ami, the oldest existing brothel in Berlin, is also available as Depeche Mode: Alive in Berlin (HD) on iTunes from 19 December 2014. The soundtrack was also released as a double CD package.

Before its release, the DVD was launched with one-off theatrical screenings in selected cities around the world, including over 40 cinemas in Germany.

== Track listing ==
=== Box set ===
All tracks are written by Martin L. Gore, except where noted.

Live in Berlin – DVD
No.	Title	Original release	Length
1.	"Welcome to My World"	Delta Machine	6:42
2.	"Angel"	Delta Machine	4:18
3.	"Walking in My Shoes"	Songs of Faith and Devotion	6:33
4.	"Precious"	Playing the Angel	5:02
5.	"Black Celebration"	Black Celebration	4:33
6.	"Should Be Higher" (writers: Dave Gahan, Kurt Uenala)	Delta Machine	5:51
7.	"Policy of Truth"	Violator	5:26
8.	"The Child Inside"	Delta Machine	4:20
9.	"But Not Tonight" (acoustic)	Black Celebration	6:48
10.	"Heaven"	Delta Machine	4:12
11.	"Soothe My Soul"	Delta Machine	7:15
12.	"A Pain That I'm Used To" (Jacques Lu Cont's Remix)	Playing the Angel	4:28
13.	"A Question of Time"	Black Celebration	4:24
14.	"Enjoy the Silence"	Violator	7:27
15.	"Personal Jesus"	Violator	8:41
16.	"Shake the Disease" (acoustic)	The Singles 81→85	4:58
17.	"Halo" (Goldfrapp Remix)	Violator	4:52
18.	"Just Can't Get Enough" (writer: Vince Clarke)	Speak & Spell	6:03
19.	"I Feel You"	Songs of Faith and Devotion	6:47
20.	"Never Let Me Down Again"	Music for the Masses	7:30
21.	"Goodbye"	Delta Machine	5:34

Alive in Berlin – DVD

1. Full live show + 15 interview pieces
2. Condemnation (Bordello Acoustic Sessions)
3. Judas (Bordello Acoustic Sessions)

Live in Berlin – disc one
No.	Title	Length
1.	"Welcome to My World"	6:42
2.	"Angel"	4:18
3.	"Walking in My Shoes"	6:33
4.	"Precious"	5:03
5.	"Black Celebration"	4:34
6.	"Should Be Higher"	5:51
7.	"Policy of Truth"	5:26
8.	"The Child Inside"	4:21
9.	"But Not Tonight" (acoustic)	6:48
10.	"Heaven"	4:13
11.	"Soothe My Soul"	7:15

Live in Berlin – disc two
No.	Title	Length
1.	"A Pain That I'm Used To" (Jacques Lu Cont's Remix)	4:28
2.	"A Question of Time"	4:24
3.	"Enjoy the Silence"	7:27
4.	"Personal Jesus"	8:42
5.	"Shake the Disease" (acoustic)	4:58
6.	"Halo" (Goldfrapp remix)	4:53
7.	"Just Can't Get Enough"	6:03
8.	"I Feel You"	6:47
9.	"Never Let Me Down Again"	7:30
10.	"Goodbye"	5:34

Delta Machine – 5.1 audio on Blu-ray

1. "Welcome to My World"
2. "Angel"
3. "Heaven"
4. "Secret to the End"
5. "My Little Universe"
6. "Slow"
7. "Broken"
8. "The Child Inside"
9. "Soft Touch/Raw Nerve"
10. "Should Be Higher"
11. "Alone"
12. "Soothe My Soul"
13. "Goodbye"
14. "Long Time Lie"
15. "Happens All the Time"
16. "Always"
17. "All That's Mine"

=== Two-disc edition ===
Disc one
No.	Title	Length
1.	"Welcome to My World"	6:42
2.	"Angel"	4:18
3.	"Walking in My Shoes"	6:33
4.	"Precious"	5:03
5.	"Black Celebration"	4:34
6.	"Should Be Higher" (writers: Gahan, Uenala)	5:51
7.	"Policy of Truth"	5:26
8.	"The Child Inside"	4:21
9.	"But Not Tonight" (acoustic)	6:48
10.	"Heaven"	4:13
11.	"Soothe My Soul"	7:15

Disc two
No.	Title	Length
1.	"A Pain That I'm Used To" (Jacques Lu Cont's Remix)	4:28
2.	"A Question of Time"	4:24
3.	"Enjoy the Silence"	7:27
4.	"Personal Jesus"	8:42
5.	"Shake the Disease" (acoustic)	4:58
6.	"Halo" (Goldfrapp Remix)	4:53
7.	"Just Can't Get Enough" (writer: Clarke)	6:03
8.	"I Feel You"	6:47
9.	"Never Let Me Down Again"	7:30
10.	"Goodbye"	5:34

== Personnel ==
Credits adapted from the liner notes of Live in Berlin.

=== Depeche Mode ===
- Dave Gahan
- Martin Gore
- Andrew Fletcher

=== Additional musicians ===
- Christian Eigner – drums
- Peter Gordeno – keyboards, backing vocals, bass guitar on "A Pain That I'm Used To"

=== Technical ===
- Anton Corbijn – artistic direction, stage design, film direction, camera
- Paul Normandale – lighting direction
- Kirsten Sohrauer – film production
- Philipp Hennig – camera
- Jan-Hinrich Hoffman – camera
- Martin Schlecht – camera
- Oliver Moron – camera
- Friedemann Frank – sound
- James Rose – film Editor
- Necker – audio recording
- Antony King – audio recording
- Kerry Hopwood – audio recording technical engineering
- Tom Worley – audio recording technical engineering
- Terence Hulkes – audio recording technical engineering
- Adrian Hall – Stereo and 5.1 mixing
- Joe Adams – additional Pro Tools editing
- MJ – audio production
- Miles Showell – Stereo audio mastering
- Simon Gibson – 5.1 audio mastering
- Ian Duncan – audio dubbing mixing

=== Artwork ===
- Stephen Averill – packaging
- Anton Corbijn – logos, photography, visuals, art direction

== Charts ==
=== Weekly charts ===
Weekly chart performance for Live in Berlin
Chart (2014–2016)	Peak position
Austrian Albums (Ö3 Austria)	13
Belgian Albums (Ultratop Flanders)	33
Belgian Albums (Ultratop Wallonia)	12
Croatian International Albums (HDU)	12
Czech Albums (ČNS IFPI)	70
Danish Albums (Hitlisten)	20
Dutch Albums (Album Top 100)	36
Finnish Albums (Suomen virallinen lista)	37
French Albums (SNEP)	9
German Albums (Offizielle Top 100)	2
Hungarian Albums (MAHASZ)	10
Irish Albums (IRMA)	42
Italian Albums (FIMI)	11
Polish Albums (ZPAV)	7
Scottish Albums (OCC)	76
Swedish Albums (Sverigetopplistan)	22
Swiss Albums (Schweizer Hitparade)	13
UK Albums (OCC)	64

=== Year-end charts ===
Year-end chart performance for Live in Berlin
Chart (2014)	Position
Belgian Albums (Ultratop Wallonia)	115
French Albums (SNEP)	175
German Albums (Offizielle Top 100)	48

== Certifications ==
Certifications for Live in Berlin
Region	Certification	Certified units/sales
Poland (ZPAV)	Gold	5,000^{*}
^{*} Sales figures based on certification alone.
