= List of number-one hits of 2013 (Austria) =

This is a list of the Austrian number-one singles and albums of 2013 as compiled by Ö3 Austria Top 40, the official chart provider of Austria.

Issue date	Song	Artist	Album	Artist
4 January	"Einmal um die Welt"	Cro	Christmas	Michael Bublé
11 January	"Hall of Fame"	The Script featuring Will.i.am	The Truth About Love	Pink
18 January	"Hall of Fame"	The Script featuring Will.i.am	Neujahrskonzert 2013	Vienna Philharmonic / Franz Welser-Möst
25 January	"Scream & Shout"	Will.i.am featuring Britney Spears	Abenteuer 20 Jahre	Andrea Berg
1 February	"Scream & Shout"	Will.i.am featuring Britney Spears	Abenteuer 20 Jahre	Andrea Berg
8 February	"Scream & Shout"	Will.i.am featuring Britney Spears	Abenteuer 20 Jahre	Andrea Berg
15 February	"Go for Gold"	Andreas Gabalier	Abenteuer 20 Jahre	Andrea Berg
22 February	"Go for Gold"	Andreas Gabalier	Jung, brutal, gutaussehend 2	Kollegah featuring Farid Bang
1 March	"Go for Gold"	Andreas Gabalier	Push The Sky Away	Nick Cave & The Bad Seeds
8 March	"Scream & Shout"	Will.i.am featuring Britney Spears	Lindsey Stirling	Lindsey Stirling
15 March	"Let Her Go"	Passenger	Lindsey Stirling	Lindsey Stirling
22 March	"Let Her Go"	Passenger	What About Now	Bon Jovi
29 March	"Let Her Go"	Passenger	Symphonie des Lebens	Semino Rossi
5 April	"Let Her Go"	Passenger	Delta Machine	Depeche Mode
12 April	"Let Her Go"	Passenger	Symphonie des Lebens	Semino Rossi
19 April	"Just Give Me a Reason"	Pink featuring Nate Ruess	Outlaw Gentlemen & Shady Ladies	Volbeat
26 April	"Just Give Me a Reason"	Pink featuring Nate Ruess	To Be Loved	Michael Bublé
3 May	"Rosana"	Wax	Ich hör auf mein Herz	Christina Stürmer
10 May	"Rosana"	Wax	Now What?!	Deep Purple
17 May	"Rosana"	Wax	Dann mach's gut	Reinhard Mey
24 May	"Mein Herz"	Beatrice Egli	Besser wird's nicht	Fendrich
31 May	"Get Lucky"	Daft Punk featuring Pharrell Williams	Random Access Memories	Daft Punk
7 June	"Get Lucky"	Daft Punk featuring Pharrell Williams	New York - Rio - Rosenheim	Sportfreunde Stiller
14 June	"Blurred Lines"	Robin Thicke featuring T.I. and Pharrell Williams	Bei meiner Seele	Xavier Naidoo
21 June	"Blurred Lines"	Robin Thicke featuring T.I. and Pharrell Williams	Home Sweet Home	Andreas Gabalier
28 June	"Blurred Lines"	Robin Thicke featuring T.I. and Pharrell Williams	Im Herzen jung	Die Amigos
5 July	"Blurred Lines"	Robin Thicke featuring T.I. and Pharrell Williams	Home Sweet Home	Andreas Gabalier
12 July	"Wake Me Up!"	Avicii	Dahoam	Seer
19 July	"Wake Me Up!"	Avicii	Dahoam	Seer
26 July	"Wake Me Up!"	Avicii	NWA	Shindy
2 August	"Wake Me Up!"	Avicii	Dahoam	Seer
9 August	"Wake Me Up!"	Avicii	Heut' ist dein Tag	Hansi Hinterseer
16 August	"Wake Me Up!"	Avicii	Dahoam	Seer
23 August	"Wake Me Up!"	Avicii	Verdi	Anna Netrebko / Orchestra Teatro Regio Torino / Gianandrea Noseda
30 August	"Wake Me Up!"	Avicii	Verdi	Anna Netrebko / Orchestra Teatro Regio Torino / Gianandrea Noseda
6 September	"Wake Me Up!"	Avicii	Stricksocken Swagger	Y-Titty
13 September	"Roar"	Katy Perry	Mitten ins Herz	Oliver Haindt
20 September	"Roar"	Katy Perry	Atlantis	Andrea Berg
27 September	"Dear Darlin'"	Olly Murs	Atlantis	Andrea Berg
4 October	"Dear Darlin'"	Olly Murs	Atlantis	Andrea Berg
11 October	"Dear Darlin'"	Olly Murs	Hinterland	Casper
18 October	"Bonfire Heart"	James Blunt	Farbenspiel	Helene Fischer
25 October	"Dear Darlin'"	Olly Murs	Farbenspiel	Helene Fischer
1 November	"Hey Brother"	Avicii	Moon Landing	James Blunt
8 November	"Jubel"	Klingande	Kiddy Contest Vol. 19	Kiddy Contest Kids
15 November	"Jubel"	Klingande	The Marshall Mathers LP 2	Eminem
22 November	"Jubel"	Klingande	Artpop	Lady Gaga
29 November	"Timber"	Pitbull featuring Kesha	Swings Both Ways	Robbie Williams
6 December	"Stolen Dance"	Milky Chance	Swings Both Ways	Robbie Williams
13 December	"Timber"	Pitbull featuring Kesha	Swings Both Ways	Robbie Williams
20 December	"Timber"	Pitbull featuring Kesha	Swings Both Ways	Robbie Williams
27 December	No Top 40 released			
