= The Broken =

The Broken may refer to:

- The Broken (film), a 2008 horror film directed by Sean Ellis
- thebroken, a video podcast hosted by Kevin Rose and Dan Huard
- The Broken, a 2010 single by progressive rock group Coheed and Cambria
- The Broken (album), the debut album by Brokencyde from 2007
- Broken (disambiguation)
