= Broken Bow =

Broken Bow may refer to:

In geography:

- Broken Bow, Nebraska, United States
- Broken Bow, Oklahoma, United States
- Broken Bow Lake, a man-made lake in southeast Oklahoma
- Broken Bow Township, Custer County, Nebraska, United States

In other fields:

- "Broken Bow" (Enterprise episode), the pilot episode of the television series Star Trek: Enterprise
  - Broken Bow (novel), the novelization of the above Star Trek episode
- Broken Bow Memorial Stadium, the home of the Broken Bow Savages
- Broken Bow Records, a country music record label
- Broken Bow High School (disambiguation)
