= Tour of the Universe: Barcelona 20/21.11.09 =

Video by Depeche Mode
- Released: 5 November 2010
- Recorded: 20–21 November 2009
- Venues: Palau Sant Jordi (Barcelona, Spain)
- Genres: Synth-pop; alternative dance; electronic rock; dance-rock; new wave
- Length: 259 minutes
- Label: Mute
- Director: Russell Thomas
- Producers: Anne Carruthers; MJ; Jim Parsons

Depeche Mode chronology
Touring the Angel: Live in Milan (2006)	Tour of the Universe: Barcelona 20/21.11.09 (2010)	Live in Berlin (2014)

Tour of the Universe: Barcelona 20/21.11.09 is a live video album by English electronic music band Depeche Mode, released on 5 November 2010 by Mute Records. It was filmed at Palau Sant Jordi in Barcelona, Spain on 20 and 21 November 2009 during the band's 2009–10 worldwide Tour of the Universe. It is the first Blu-ray release by the band.

This concert film was released in three formats: the standard edition including the concert DVD and the two audio CDs, the deluxe edition with additional special features DVD and the two audio CDs, and a Blu-ray Disc with the concert and special features.

== Track listing ==
=== DVD 1 – Main concert ===
No.	Title	Original Album	Length
1.	"In Chains"	Sounds of the Universe – 2009	7:24
2.	"Wrong"	Sounds of the Universe – 2009	3:25
3.	"Hole to Feed"	Sounds of the Universe – 2009	4:32
4.	"Walking in My Shoes"	Songs of Faith and Devotion – 1993	6:33
5.	"It's No Good"	Ultra – 1997	5:30
6.	"A Question of Time"	Black Celebration – 1986	4:37
7.	"Precious"	Playing the Angel – 2005	4:54
8.	"Fly on the Windscreen"	Black Celebration – 1986	5:40
9.	"Jezebel"	Sounds of the Universe – 2009	4:26
10.	"Home (Acoustic)"	Ultra – 1997	5:38
11.	"Come Back"	Sounds of the Universe – 2009	6:03
12.	"Policy of Truth"	Violator – 1990	5:18
13.	"In Your Room (Album version/Zephyr Mix hybrid)"	Songs of Faith and Devotion – 1993	5:40
14.	"I Feel You"	Songs of Faith and Devotion – 1993	6:47
15.	"Enjoy the Silence"	Violator – 1990	6:38
16.	"Never Let Me Down Again"	Music for the Masses – 1987	8:22
17.	"Dressed in Black (Acoustic)"	Black Celebration – 1986	3:55
18.	"Stripped"	Black Celebration – 1986	5:18
19.	"Behind the Wheel"	Music for the Masses – 1987	5:11
20.	"Personal Jesus"	Violator – 1990	7:02
21.	"Waiting for the Night (Bare version)"	Violator – 1990	7:23

Bonus tracks
No.	Title	Original Album	Length
22.	"World in My Eyes"	Violator – 1990	5:18
23.	"Sister of Night"	Ultra – 1997	5:42
24.	"Miles Away/The Truth Is"	Sounds of the Universe – 2009	4:18
25.	"One Caress"	Songs of Faith and Devotion – 1993	3:52

=== Deluxe edition DVD 2 – Special features ===
No.	Title	Length
1.	"'Most people just worry about hitting the right note.' Inside the Universe"	35:30

Tour of the Universe – Screens
No.	Title	Length
2.	"In Chains"	6:52
3.	"Walking in My Shoes"	6:12
4.	"Precious"	4:46
5.	"Come Back"	5:52
6.	"Policy of Truth"	5:07
7.	"Enjoy the Silence"	6:46
8.	"Personal Jesus"	4:51

Tour of the Universe – Rehearsals
No.	Title	Director(s)	Length
9.	"Wrong"	Ross Hallard and Philip M. Lane	3:36
10.	"Walking in My Shoes"	Ross Hallard and Philip M. Lane	6:18

No.	Title	Editor	Length
11.	"Insight" (Live)		4:41
12.	"Hole to Feed" (Live Screen Montage)	Rob Chandler	4:04
13.	"Behind the Wheel" (Barcelona Montage)	Char Williams	5:15
14.	"Never Let Me Down Again" (Live Screen Montage)	Tom Palliser	6:50

Sounds of the Universe – Videos
No.	Title	Director(s)	Length
15.	"Wrong"	Patrick Daughters	3:24
16.	"Peace"	Jonas & François	3:59
17.	"Hole to Feed"	Eric Wareheim	4:17
18.	"Fragile Tension"	Rob Chandler and Barney Steel	3:43

=== CD 1 ===
No.	Title	Length
1.	"In Chains"	8:13
2.	"Wrong"	3:48
3.	"Hole to Feed"	4:10
4.	"Walking in My Shoes"	6:19
5.	"It's No Good"	5:10
6.	"A Question of Time"	4:36
7.	"Precious"	4:44
8.	"Fly on the Windscreen"	5:35
9.	"Jezebel"	4:47
10.	"Home" (Acoustic)	6:39

=== CD 2 ===
No.	Title	Length
1.	"Come Back"	6:05
2.	"Policy of Truth"	5:14
3.	"In Your Room" (Zephyr Mix [with bits from the album version])	5:26
4.	"I Feel You"	6:04
5.	"Enjoy the Silence"	7:12
6.	"Never Let Me Down Again"	8:24
7.	"Dressed in Black" (Acoustic)	4:10
8.	"Stripped"	5:20
9.	"Behind the Wheel"	5:10
10.	"Personal Jesus"	6:33
11.	"Waiting for the Night" (Bare version)	7:48

== Personnel ==
Credits adapted from the liner notes of the deluxe edition of Tour of the Universe: Barcelona 20/21.11.09.

- Joe Adams – mix assistance, Pro Tools editing
- Anne Carruthers – audio co-ordination, production
- John Catlin – mix assistance, Pro Tools editing
- Anton Corbijn – film director (DVD 2 tracks 2–8)
- Caitlin Cresswell – recording technical engineering
- Christian Eigner – drums, mixing
- JD Fanger – Depeche Mode office
- Chris Goddard – recording technical engineering
- Peter Gordeno – keyboards
- Dan Goudie – mix assistance, Pro Tools editing
- Simon Heyworth – mastering
- Kim Hiorthøy – front cover symbol (based on original design by Anton Corbijn)
- Kerry Hopwood – mixing, programming
- Jonathan Kessler – management
- Antony King – mixing
- David "Skippi" Loudoun – mix assistance, Pro Tools editing, recording technical engineering
- Catherine Marks – mix assistance, Pro Tools editing
- MJ – audio co-ordination, production
- Kevin Paul – mixing
- Jim Parsons – film producer (DVD 1)
- Will Shapland – recording
- ShaughnessyWorks – packaging design
- Daniel Simmons – digital artwork
- P.A. Taylor – packaging design
- Russell Thomas – film director (DVD 1)

== Charts ==
=== Weekly charts ===
Chart (2010)	Peak position
Austrian Music DVD Chart	1
Belgian Music DVD Chart (Flanders)	2
Belgian Music DVD Chart (Wallonia)	2
Czech Music Video Chart	2
Danish Music DVD Chart	2
Dutch Music DVD Chart	8
Finnish Music DVD Chart	5
French Music DVD Chart	5
German Music DVD Chart	1
Hungarian Music DVD Chart	1
Irish Music DVD Chart	2
Italian Music DVD Chart	5
Swedish Music DVD Chart	6
Swiss Music DVD Chart	1
UK Music Video Chart	2

Chart (2010)	Peak position
Croatian Albums Chart	29
Czech Albums Chart	6
Danish Albums Chart	25
European Top 100 Albums	6
French Albums Chart	7
German Albums Chart	1
Italian Albums Chart	3
Mexican Albums Chart	38
Portuguese Albums Chart	8
Spanish Albums Chart	4
Swedish Albums Chart	24

=== Year-end charts ===
Chart (2010)	Position
Belgian Music DVD Chart (Flanders)	25
Belgian Music DVD Chart (Wallonia)	11

Chart (2010)	Peak position
French Albums Chart	187
German Albums Chart	64

== Certifications ==
Region	Certification	Certified units/sales
Germany (BVMI) Video album	Platinum	50,000^{^}
Italy (FIMI)	Gold	30,000^{*}
^{*} Sales figures based on certification alone.^{^} Shipments figures based on certification alone.

== Release history ==
Region	Date	Format	Label	Ref.
Australia	5 November 2010	DVD + 2-CD; Blu-ray	EMI	
Germany	5 November 2010	DVD + 2-CD; 2-DVD + 2-CD; Blu-ray	EMI	
France	8 November 2010	2-DVD + 2-CD; Blu-ray	EMI	
United Kingdom	8 November 2010	DVD + 2-CD; 2-DVD + 2CD; Blu-ray	Mute	
United States	9 November 2010	DVD + 2-CD	Mute; Capitol; Virgin	
Japan	1 December 2010	DVD + 2-CD	EMI	
