= Broken (2005 film) =

2006 short film by Alex Ferrari

- Film poster
- Directed by: Alex Ferrari
- Written by: Alex Ferrari; Jorge F. Rodriguez
- Starring: Samantha Gurewitz; Amber Crawford; Paul Gordon
- Distributed by: Indieflix
- Release date: 2005
- Running time: 17 minutes
- Country: United States
- Language: English
- Budget: $8,000

Broken is a 2005 "indie short" film co-written by Alex Ferrari and Jorge F. Rodriguez and directed by Ferrari. Starring Samantha Gurewitz, Paul Gordon, and Amber Crawford, the film had a limited run in theatres before being released to DVD.

== Plot ==
Bonnie, abducted by a sadistic stranger and his colorful entourage, discovers that the key to her survival lies within the familiar realm of a recurring dream.

== Cast ==
- Samantha Gurewitz as Bonnie
- Paul Gordon as Duncan
- Amber Crawford as Marquez
- Derek Evans as Christian
- Tony Gomez as Gabriel
- Jose Luis Navas as Snake
- Danilo Begovic as Pinball
- Stephan Morris as Shamon
