= Broken River =

Broken River may refer to:

== Australia ==
- Broken River (Victoria), a tributary of the Goulburn River
- Broken River (Queensland), a river in Eungella National Park noted as a location for viewing the platypus
- Broken River, Queensland, a locality in the Mackay Region

== New Zealand ==
- Broken River (New Zealand), a river
- Broken River Ski Area, a club skifield in South Island
- Cave Stream, also known as Broken River Cave
