= Remixes 2: 81–11 =

2011 remix album by Depeche Mode

Remix album by Depeche Mode
- Released: 6 June 2011
- Recorded: 1981–2011
- Length: 223:32
- Label: Mute
- Compilers: Depeche Mode; Roland Brown

Depeche Mode chronology
Recording the Universe (2009)	Remixes 2: 81–11 (2011)	Delta Machine (2013)

Singles from Remixes 2: 81–11
- 1. "Personal Jesus 2011" Released: 18 April 2011

Professional ratings
Aggregate scores
Source	Rating
Metacritic	56/100
Review scores
Source	Rating
AllMusic	3/5 stars
laut.de	3/5 stars
Mojo	2/5 stars
Pitchfork	4.3/10
PopMatters	7/10
Release Magazine	6/10
Q	2/5 stars
Under the Radar	6/10 stars

Remixes 2: 81–11 is a remix compilation album by the English electronic music band Depeche Mode, released on 6 June 2011 by Mute Records.

== Background ==
The album is the band's second remix collection, following Remixes 81–04 (2004). It spans the band's entire career up that point and includes new arrangements by former Depeche Mode members Vince Clarke and Alan Wilder. The compilation concludes the band's recording contract with EMI.

The album is available in two different CD formats, single or triple-disc, as well as digital downloads and a six-LP box set. The album was preceded by the single "Personal Jesus 2011", with the leading remix of "Personal Jesus" by the Norwegian production team Stargate. Clarke's remix of "Behind the Wheel", titled "Behind the Wheel 2011", was released as a promotional single in the United States on 6 June 2011.

The version of the album available through Beatport replaces 10 of the tracks on the album with either instrumental or dub versions and features a different cover art.

== Track listing ==
All songs written and composed by Martin L. Gore, except where noted.

=== One-disc version ===
(Mute Records; CDMuteL18; 5099909663527)

No.	Title	Writer(s)	Length
1.	"Dream On" (Bushwacka Tough Guy Mix Edit)		5:22
2.	"Personal Jesus" (The Stargate Mix)		3:55
3.	"Suffer Well" (M83 Remix)	Dave Gahan; Christian Eigner; Andrew Phillpott	4:32
4.	"John the Revelator" (Unkle Reconstruction)		4:59
5.	"In Chains" (Tigerskin's No Sleep Remix Edit)		7:12
6.	"Peace" (SixToes Remix)		5:13
7.	"Tora! Tora! Tora!" (Karlsson + Winnberg (from Miike Snow) Remix)		7:38
8.	"Never Let Me Down Again" (Eric Prydz Remix)		7:01
9.	"I Want It All" (Roland M. Dill Remix)	Gahan; Eigner; Phillpott	6:43
10.	"Wrong" (Trentemøller Club Remix)		6:53
11.	"Puppets" (Röyksopp Remix)	Vince Clarke	4:40
12.	"Everything Counts" (Oliver Huntemann + Stephan Bodzin Dub)		6:53
13.	"A Pain That I'm Used To" (Jacques Lu Cont Remix)		7:53
Total length:			78:54

=== Three-disc version ===
(Mute Records; XLCDMuteL18; 5099909663626)

Disc one
No.	Title	Writer(s)	Length
1.	"Dream On" (Bushwacka Tough Guy Mix)		6:08
2.	"Suffer Well" (M83 Remix)	Gahan; Eigner; Phillpott	4:31
3.	"John the Revelator" (Unkle Reconstruction)		4:59
4.	"In Chains" (Tigerskin's No Sleep Remix)		7:45
5.	"Peace" (SixToes Remix)		5:13
6.	"Lilian" (Chab Vocal Remix Edit)		6:14
7.	"Never Let Me Down Again" (Digitalism Remix)		4:37
8.	"Corrupt" (Efdemin Remix)		6:29
9.	"Everything Counts" (Oliver Huntemann + Stephan Bodzin Dub)		6:53
10.	"Happiest Girl" (The Pulsating Orbital Vocal Mix)		7:57
11.	"Walking in My Shoes" (Anandamidic Mix)		6:11
12.	"Personal Jesus" (The Stargate Mix)		3:58
13.	"Slowblow" (Darren Price Mix)		6:27

Disc two
No.	Title	Length
1.	"Wrong" (Trentemøller Club Remix)	6:55
2.	"World in My Eyes" (Dub in My Eyes)	6:56
3.	"Fragile Tension" (Peter Bjorn + John Remix)	3:44
4.	"Strangelove" (Tim Simenon/Mark Saunders Remix)	6:31
5.	"A Pain That I'm Used To" (Jacques Lu Cont Remix)	7:49
6.	"The Darkest Star" (Monolake Remix)	5:43
7.	"I Feel You" (Helmet at the Helm Mix)	6:39
8.	"Higher Love" (Adrenaline Mix Edit)	4:47
9.	"Fly on the Windscreen" (Death Mix)	5:09
10.	"Barrel of a Gun" (United Mix)	6:36
11.	"Only When I Lose Myself" (Dan the Automator Mix)	4:57
12.	"Ghost" (Le Weekend Remix)	8:21

Disc three
No.	Title	Writer(s)	Length
1.	"Personal Jesus" (Alex Metric Remix Edit)		3:27
2.	"Never Let Me Down Again" (Eric Prydz Remix)		7:00
3.	"Behind the Wheel" (Vince Clarke Remix)		6:42
4.	"Leave in Silence" (Claro Intelecto 'The Last Time' Remix)		4:56
5.	"In Chains" (Alan Wilder Remix)		7:17
6.	"When the Body Speaks" (Karlsson + Winnberg Remix)		6:55
7.	"Puppets" (Röyksopp Remix)	Clarke	4:40
8.	"Tora! Tora! Tora!" (Karlsson + Winnberg (from Miike Snow) Remix)		7:38
9.	"Freestate" (Clark Remix)		4:49
10.	"I Want It All" (Roland M. Dill Remix)	Gahan; Eigner; Phillpott	6:42
11.	"A Question of Time" (Joebot Presents 'Radio Face' Remix)		5:32
12.	"Personal Jesus" (Sie Medway-Smith Remix)		6:25
Total length:			223:32

iTunes Store deluxe edition bonus tracks
No.	Title	Length
13.	"Master and Servant" (RSS Remix)	4:47
14.	"In Chains" (Myer vs Wilder Deconstruction)	6:34

Amazon digital deluxe edition bonus tracks
No.	Title	Length
13.	"Sister of Night" (Ida Engberg's Giving Voice to the Flame Remix)	8:47
14.	"Sweetest Perfection" (Phil Kieran Vocal Mix)	7:10

HMV Digital UK deluxe edition bonus tracks
No.	Title	Length
13.	"The Sun and the Rainfall" (Black Light Odyssey's Further Excerpts)	6:24
14.	"The Sinner in Me" (SixToes Remix)	5:06

WiMP deluxe edition bonus bonus track (Denmark, Norway and Sweden)
No.	Title	Length
13.	"The Sun and the Rainfall" (Black Light Odyssey's Further Excerpts)	6:24

== Personnel ==
Credits adapted from the liner notes of Remixes 2: 81–11.

- Depeche Mode – compilers
- Roland Brown – compiler
- Mike Marsh – mastering
- Anna Bergfors (Note: Credited as Mat Cook) – design

== Charts ==
=== Weekly charts ===
Weekly chart performance for Remixes 2: 81–11
Chart (2011)	Peak position
Austrian Albums (Ö3 Austria)	11
Belgian Albums (Ultratop Flanders)	22
Belgian Albums (Ultratop Wallonia)	7
Croatian Albums (HDU)	31
Czech Albums (ČNS IFPI)	4
Danish Albums (Hitlisten)	4
Dutch Albums (Album Top 100)	69
Finnish Albums (Suomen virallinen lista)	44
French Albums (SNEP)	11
German Albums (Offizielle Top 100)	3
Greek Albums (IFPI)	34
Hungarian Albums (MAHASZ)	15
Irish Albums (IRMA)	46
Italian Albums (FIMI)	9
Mexican Albums (Top 100 Mexico)	33
Norwegian Albums (VG-lista)	30
Polish Albums (ZPAV)	13
Portuguese Albums (AFP)	14
Russian Albums (2M)	13
Scottish Albums (Official Charts)	30
Spanish Albums (Promusicae)	5
Swedish Albums (Sverigetopplistan)	9
Swiss Albums (Schweizer Hitparade)	6
UK Albums (Official Charts)	24
US Billboard 200	105
US Top Alternative Albums (Billboard)	24
US Top Dance Albums (Billboard)	3
US Top Rock Albums (Billboard)	38

=== Year-end charts ===
Year-end chart performance for Remixes 2: 81–11
Chart (2011)	Position
Belgian Albums (Ultratop Wallonia)	85
Polish Albums (ZPAV)	96
