= Should Be Higher =

Single by Depeche Mode

from the album Delta Machine
- Released: 11 October 2013
- Genre: Electronic; industrial
- Length: 5:04
- Label: Columbia
- Songwriters: Dave Gahan; Kurt Uenala
- Producer: Ben Hillier

Depeche Mode singles chronology
"Soothe My Soul" (2013)	"Should Be Higher" (2013)	"Where's the Revolution" (2017)

Music video
- "Should Be Higher" (live) on YouTube

"Should Be Higher" is a song by the English electronic music band Depeche Mode from their thirteenth studio album, Delta Machine (2013). It was released as the album's third single on 11 October 2013 in Germany, followed by releases in the UK, France, and North America the same month. Written by lead singer Dave Gahan alongside Swiss electronic musician Kurt Uelena, it is the third single from the band to be co-written by Gahan, and was inspired by the singer's former struggles with substance abuse and alcoholism.

"Should Be Higher" received generally positive reviews from music critics, who considered it a highlight of Delta Machine and often praised its instrumental alongside Gahan's vocals. The track debuted at number 81 on the UK Singles Chart on 20 October 2013, and remains the last Depeche Mode song to enter the chart to date.

== Background ==
"Should Be Higher" is the third single in Depeche Mode's discography to feature writing from lead singer Dave Gahan, preceded by the singles "Suffer Well" (2006) and "Hole to Feed" (2009). Gahan co-wrote it with Swiss electronic musician Kurt Uenala, who did additional programming for Delta Machine and wrote with Gahan on the tracks "Secret to the End" and "Broken". The two first met around 2007 when Gahan was looking for an artist to work on demos with him for a new Depeche Mode album. Uenala, who was currently living in New York City after moving there in 2000, was already a fan of the band and eager to work with them, showing up to Gahan's studio at 11 o'clock. In a 2023 interview, Uelena reflected on Gahan as being nicer than most music stars when they met, as Gahan went with him to buy an office chair for the studio despite the fact it was raining outside, even helping to screw the parts back in place once they brought it back. Uelena subsequently became an audio engineer for both Depeche Mode's music and Gahan's solo work.

== Composition and lyrics ==
The lyrics to "Should Be Higher" were inspired by Gahan's struggles with substance abuse and alcoholism during the 1990s. In an interview, Gahan reflected on a Christmas Eve where he was at a restaurant with many people drinking as the catalyst for the song's conception, as he had to stop himself from taking a glass of wine in fear of the "Pandora's box" it could open.

Produced by Ben Hillier with additional programming from Uenala and Christoffer Berg, "Should Be Higher" features a minimal electronic instrumental with industrial rhythms, which builds upon itself before becoming a more stripped-back arrangement several times throughout. It features background vocals from Depeche Mode's main songwriter Martin Gore, who creates contrast from Gahan's lead vocals and adds harmonies. Gahan's vocals have been described as "yearning" in tone and soar into a falsetto during the chorus.

== Release and reception ==
Delta Machine was released on 22 March 2013 by Columbia and Mute Records, with "Should Be Higher" as its tenth track. The song was first released as a single in Germany on 11 October 2013, followed by releases in the UK and France on 14 October, and North America a day later. A radio edit done by Spike Stent was included on each single release in place of the album version, backed with a remix by Little Vampire. The same day as the Germany release, an extended play (EP) of remixes was released, featuring contributions from Jim Jones Reveu, Jim Sclavunos, and MAPS alongside the original single mixes.

"Should Be Higher" received generally positive reviews from music critics. Writing for DIY, Matthew Lombardi lauded the song's "effortless and sombre build-up to a swirling and hypnotic pay-off," as well as the "stunning harmonies" made by Gore's backing vocals. Billboard's Zel McCarthy praised Gahan's vocals, feeling that "[t]he vocal risks Gahan takes on 'Should Be Higher' are the ones he should be taking more of." Francesco Eandi of Humans vs. Robots called the track an "instant classic," while Ultimate Classic Rock writer Michael Christopher retrospectively called it "one of the album highlights." In a more negative review, Pitchfork's Douglas Walk said that Uenala's composition is "generally a reasonably convincing imitation" of Gore's "middling" music on the album, disregarding the song as "yet another on the pile of ex-junkie lyrics."

== Music video ==
The music video for "Should Be Higher", directed by Anton Corbijn, premiered on Vevo on 22 August 2013. The video comprises live footage from the Delta Machine Tour shows in Berlin, Leipzig, and Munich.

== Track listing ==
These are the following listings for every release of "Should Be Higher".

CD single / digital download
No.	Title	Length
1.	"Should Be Higher" (radio mix)	3:29
2.	"Should Be Higher" (Little Vampire remix single edit)	3:59
Total length:		7:18

CD maxi single / digital download
No.	Title	Length
1.	"Should Be Higher" (Jim Sclavunos from Grinderman remix)	4:11
2.	"Should Be Higher" (Little Vampire remix)	5:30
3.	"Should Be Higher" (MAPS remix)	5:42
4.	"Should Be Higher" (Jim Jones Revue remix)	5:14
5.	"Should Be Higher" (radio mix)	3:29
Total length:		24:06

12-inch single
No.	Title	Length
1.	"Should Be Higher" (Truss remix)	6:21
2.	"Should Be Higher" (MPIA3 definition)	5:52
3.	"Should Be Higher" (Koen Groenveveld Massive remix)	6:43
4.	"Should Be Higher" (Pangaea dub remix)	4:09
5.	"Should Be Higher" (Überzone remix)	4:51
6.	"Should Be Higher" (DJMREX remix)	6:24

== Charts ==
Weekly chart performance for "Should Be Higher"
Chart (2013)	Peak position
Austria (Ö3 Austria Top 40)	60
France (SNEP)	58
Germany (GfK)	19
Switzerland (Schweizer Hitparade)	61
UK Singles (Official Charts)	81
US Dance Singles Sales (Billboard)	1
