= Broken Bow High School =

Broken Bow High School may refer to:

- Broken Bow High School (Broken Bow, Nebraska)
- Broken Bow High School (Broken Bow, Oklahoma), Broken Bow, Oklahoma
