= Personal Jesus =

1989 single by Depeche Mode

Single by Depeche Mode

from the album Violator
- B-side: "Dangerous"
- Released: 29 August 1989
- Recorded: 1989
- Studio: Logic (Milan)
- Genre: Synth-pop; synth-rock; blues rock; alternative rock; dance-rock
- Length: 4:56 (album version); 3:43 (7-inch version); 5:48 (12-inch version)
- Label: Mute
- Songwriter: Martin L. Gore
- Producers: Depeche Mode; Flood

Depeche Mode singles chronology
"Everything Counts" (live) (1989)	"Personal Jesus" (1989)	"Enjoy the Silence" (1990)

Music video
- "Personal Jesus" on YouTube

"Personal Jesus" is a song by the English electronic band Depeche Mode. It was released as the lead single from their seventh studio album, Violator (1990), in August 1989 by Mute Records. It reached No. 13 on the UK singles chart and No. 28 on the US Billboard Hot 100. The single was their first to enter the US top 40 since 1984's "People Are People" and was their first gold-certified single in the US. In Germany, "Personal Jesus" is one of the band's longest-charting songs, staying on the West German Singles Chart for 23 weeks. The accompanying music video was directed by Anton Corbijn and filmed in Spain.

In 2004, "Personal Jesus" was ranked No. 368 in Rolling Stone's list of "The 500 Greatest Songs of All Time", and in September 2006 it was voted as one of the "100 Greatest Songs Ever" in Q magazine. "Personal Jesus" was re-released as a single in May 2011 for the Depeche Mode remix album Remixes 2: 81–11, with the leading remix by the production team Stargate.

The song has been covered by numerous artists, including Johnny Cash and Marilyn Manson.

== Background and composition ==
In mid-1989, the band began recording in Milan with record producer Flood. After a three-week pre-production session with band member and producer Alan Wilder in London, the full band met at Logic Studios in Milan, Italy for a seven week session. Although the band didn't get much recording done in Milan, the process did help the band and Flood coalesce around their new sound and working style. The band had asked songwriter Martin Gore to bring less complete demos to these sessions, as in the past he'd brought nearly-complete demos which had limited the band's ability to improvise in the studio. Accordingly, Gore brought in a very simple demo for a new song called "Personal Jesus", which he played by tapping the beat with his foot while playing the melody on an acoustic guitar.

The song, with lyrics described as "melding the sacred and the sexual, the pious and the profane," was inspired by the book Elvis and Me (1985) by Priscilla Presley; according to Gore:

It's a song about being a Jesus for somebody else, someone to give you hope and care. It's about how Elvis Presley was her man and her mentor and how often that happens in love relationships; how everybody's heart is like a god in some way. We play these god-like parts for people but no one is perfect, and that's not a very balanced view of someone, is it?

The band liked the sound of the song, and selected it as an early single before the rest of the album had even been recorded, saying it was a perfect song that said "here's Depeche Mode, but not as you know them." The band had used guitars in songs as early as 1982 with their single "Get the Balance Right!", but this was the first guitar-forward single the band had released.

"Personal Jesus" is written in the key of F♯ minor with a tempo of 130 beats per minute in 12/8 time.

After recording "Personal Jesus" in Milan, the band moved to Puk Recording Studios in Denmark to work on the rest of the album.

== Promotion and release ==
"Personal Jesus" was released on 29 August 1989 by Mute Records in the UK, Sire Records/Warner Bros. Records in the US and Liberation Records in Australia. In the UK, the single was released on a wide variety of formats: 7-inch single (catalogue number 7BONG17), a gatefold 7-inch single (GBONG17) and a 12-inch and limited 12-inch single (12BONG17 and L12BONG17, respectively). Remixes across the releases of the song and its B-side, "Dangerous", were made by François Kevorkian, Mark Ellis, and Daniel Miller.

To support the single, a personal ad was placed in newspapers and magazines in some regions that asked "Do you need your own Personal Jesus?" and people who dialed the 1-800 number in the ad heard a clip of the song; some British newspapers such as the Aberdeen Evening News and Nottingham Evening Post refused to play the ads, and London's The Standard only relented when it was pointed out that they had already run similar advertisements for Billy Graham. The band was enthusiastic about the song, but had low expectations for its release, with both Gore and band member Andy Fletcher suggesting the song would struggle for airplay in the US given its religious theme. The band had two of its song previously censored by radio stations due to their lyrical content, "Master and Servant" and "Blasphemous Rumours", both released in 1984.

"Personal Jesus" went on to become Warner Bros' best-selling 12-inch single of all time up to that point, surpassing releases by artists such as Prince and Madonna. The single was successful enough that its B-side, "Dangerous", hit number 13 on the US Modern Rock Tracks Chart itself. By 2006, "Personal Jesus" had sold a million copies, only surpassed by their follow-up single, "Enjoy the Silence" (1990).

== Critical reception ==
David Giles from Music Week wrote: "Their first release for over two years, and hardly a radical style departure. Stark and foreboding, and still employing the distinctive technique of vocal harmonies an octave apart. Strong enough to go top five, but fast losing ground to the Belgium beat experimentalists." Stuart Maconie of the New Musical Express magazine wrote that Depeche Mode were "the most subversive singles band of the decade ... [who] make criminally brilliant pop records about God, death, crazy sex and alienation" and called the song "a hit".

== Music video ==
The video for the song was directed by frequent Depeche Mode collaborator Anton Corbijn, shot in the Tabernas Desert of Almería, in Spain, the same village where Clint Eastwood's Spaghetti Westerns were shot decades earlier. The shots of the band dressed as cowboys harkened to the Wild West, and shots of women that alluded to the location being a brothel, alongside "suggestive" mouth movements by Gore, led to MTV to censor the video. "Personal Jesus" was one of the first colorized videos the director made for the band.

The video appears on The Videos 86>98 (1998), The Best of Depeche Mode Volume 1 (2006) and Video Singles Collection (2016).

== Impact and legacy ==
In 2011, Slant Magazine listed the song at number 81 in their ranking of "The 100 Best Singles of the 1990s", writing: "Depeche Mode's gimmick is one that, after years of repetition, seems ingeniously flimsy, bundling angst and spiritual frustration with sex and pouty gloom. 'Personal Jesus' has escaped the mustiness that has enveloped most of the band's material not by flouting these tactics, but by embodying them so well. Bolstered by Dave Gahan's repeated imprecation to 'reach out and touch faith', the vocals seem perched on a neutral point between the completely earnest and the bitterly sarcastic, turning what could have been another flat religious diatribe into a thinly dual-tiered assessment of devotion and self-absorption." In 2017, Billboard ranked "Personal Jesus" second behind only "Enjoy the Silence" on a list of their "20 Best Depeche Mode Songs".

The Sex Pistols and Public Image Ltd's lead vocalist John Lydon commented on the track: "it's a serious problem for me, all this technology. The people who've used it best would be Depeche Mode. 'Your own Personal Jesus!' Bloody 'ell mate, they got it! They were using the Casiotone effect and they wrapped a song around it, but they didn't let it dictate to the song. That's another tune I just absolutely love – I was so impressed with the bravery of attempting such a subject matter."

== Other releases ==
"Personal Jesus" has appeared on every Depeche Mode compilations released since 1989: The Singles 86>98 (1998), Remixes 81–04 (2004), The Best of Depeche Mode Volume 1 (2006), and Remixes 2: 81–11 (2011). Live versions of the song performed in concert have appeared on Devotional (1993), One Night in Paris (2002), Touring the Angel: Live in Milan (2006), Tour of the Universe: Barcelona 20/21.11.09 (2010), Live in Berlin (2014) and Spirits in the Forest (2019).

== Track listings ==
All songs were written by Martin L. Gore.

- UK 7-inch and cassette single; US cassette single
1. "Personal Jesus" – 3:43
2. "Dangerous" – 4:20
- UK 7-inch single—gatefold sleeve

A1. "Personal Jesus" – 3:43
B1. "Dangerous" (Hazchemix edit) – 3:01
B2. "Personal Jesus" (acoustic) – 3:26

- UK 12-inch and mini-CD single
1. "Personal Jesus" (Holier Than Thou approach) – 5:51
2. "Dangerous" (Sensual mix) – 5:24
3. "Personal Jesus" (acoustic) – 3:26
- UK limited-edition 12-inch and mini-CD single
1. "Personal Jesus" (Pump mix) – 7:47
2. "Personal Jesus" (Telephone Stomp mix) – 5:32
3. "Dangerous" (Hazchemix) – 5:34
- US 12-inch single

A1. "Personal Jesus" (Holier Than Thou approach) – 5:43
A2. "Personal Jesus" (7-inch version) – 3:43
B1. "Personal Jesus" (Pump mix) – 7:19
B2. "Dangerous" (Hazchemix) – 5:35
B3. "Dangerous" (7-inch version) – 4:19

- US maxi-CD single
1. "Personal Jesus" (7-inch version) – 3:43
2. "Personal Jesus" (Holier Than Thou approach) – 5:43
3. "Dangerous" (Hazchemix) – 5:35
4. "Personal Jesus" (Pump mix) – 7:19
5. "Personal Jesus" (acoustic) – 3:26
6. "Dangerous" (Sensual mix) – 5:22
7. "Personal Jesus" (Telephone Stomp mix) – 5:30
8. "Dangerous" (7-inch version) – 4:19
- US maxi-cassette single

A1. "Personal Jesus" (Holier Than Thou approach) – 5:43
A2. "Personal Jesus" (7-inch version) – 3:43
A3. "Dangerous" (Sensual mix) – 5:22
A4. "Personal Jesus" (acoustic) – 3:26
B1. "Dangerous" (Hazchemix) – 5:35
B2. "Personal Jesus" (Telephone Stomp mix) – 5:30
B3. "Personal Jesus" (Pump mix) – 7:19
B4. "Dangerous" (7-inch version) – 4:19

== Charts ==
=== Weekly charts ===
1989–1990 weekly chart performance for "Personal Jesus"
Chart (1989–1990)	Peak position
Australia (ARIA)	134
Canada Top Singles (RPM)	44
Canada Dance/Urban (RPM)	14
Denmark (IFPI)	3
Europe (Eurochart Hot 100)	8
Finland (Suomen virallinen lista)	9
France (SNEP)	27
Greece (IFPI)	3
Ireland (IRMA)	7
Italy (Musica e dischi)	3
Italy Airplay (Music & Media)	2
Luxembourg (Radio Luxembourg)	11
Netherlands (Dutch Top 40 Tipparade)	14
Netherlands (Single Top 100)	62
New Zealand (Recorded Music NZ)	14
Spain (AFYVE)	3
Sweden (Sverigetopplistan)	17
Switzerland (Schweizer Hitparade)	5
UK Singles (Official Charts)	13
US Billboard Hot 100	28
US Alternative Airplay (Billboard)	3
US Dance Club Songs (Billboard) with "Dangerous"	12
US Dance Singles Sales (Billboard) with "Dangerous"	9
US Cash Box Top 100	31
West Germany (GfK)	5

2007 weekly chart performance for "Personal Jesus"
Chart (2007)	Peak position
Denmark (Tracklisten)	15

=== Year-end charts ===
Year-end chart performance for "Personal Jesus"
Chart (1989)	Position
Europe (Eurochart Hot 100)	48
West Germany (Media Control)	76

== Certifications ==
Certifications for "Personal Jesus"
Region	Certification	Certified units/sales
Denmark (IFPI Danmark)	Gold	45,000^{‡}
Germany (BVMI)	Gold	300,000^{‡}
Italy (FIMI)	Platinum	50,000^{‡}
New Zealand (RMNZ)	Gold	15,000^{‡}
Portugal (AFP)	Gold	20,000^{‡}
Spain (Promusicae)	Gold	30,000^{‡}
United Kingdom (BPI)	Platinum	600,000^{‡}
United States (RIAA)	2× Platinum	2,000,000^{‡}
^{‡} Sales+streaming figures based on certification alone.

== "Personal Jesus 2011" ==
"Personal Jesus 2011"

Single by Depeche Mode

from the album Remixes 2: 81–11
- Released: 18 April 2011
- Length: 3:56
- Label: Mute
- Songwriter: Martin L. Gore
- Producer: Stargate

Depeche Mode singles chronology
"Fragile Tension" / "Hole to Feed" (2009)	"Personal Jesus 2011" (2011)	"Heaven" (2013)

Music video
- "Personal Jesus 2011" on YouTube

"Personal Jesus 2011" is the preceding single to the remix compilation album Remixes 2: 81–11. The digital single was released in the UK on 18 April 2011 and a day later in the US. It was released on CD and vinyl on 30 May 2011.

=== Track listings ===
CD (Bong43)

1. "Personal Jesus" (The Stargate mix) – 3:57
2. "Personal Jesus" (Alex Metric remix) – 5:57
3. "Personal Jesus" (Eric Prydz remix) – 7:26
4. "Personal Jesus" (M.A.N. remix) – 5:24
5. "Personal Jesus" (Sie Medway-Smith remix) – 6:25

12-inch vinyl

1. "Personal Jesus" (Alex Metric remix) – 5:54
2. "Personal Jesus" (M.A.N. remix) – 5:22
3. "Personal Jesus" (The Stargate mix) – 3:56
4. "Personal Jesus" (Eric Prydz remix) – 7:25
5. "Personal Jesus" (Sie Medway-Smith remix) – 6:25

Digital download

1. "Personal Jesus" (The Stargate mix) – 3:56
2. "Personal Jesus" (Alex Metric remix edit) – 3:27

Beatport Exclusive digital download

1. "Personal Jesus" (Eric Prydz remix) – 7:26
2. "Never Let Me Down Again" (Eric Prydz remix) – 7:01

iTunes Store

1. "Personal Jesus" (Alex Metric remix) – 5:57
2. "Personal Jesus" (Eric Prydz remix) – 7:26
3. "Personal Jesus" (M.A.N. remix) – 5:24
4. "Personal Jesus" (Sie Medway-Smith dub) – 5:56

=== Charts ===
Weekly chart performance for "Personal Jesus 2011"
Chart (2011)	Peak position
Austria (Ö3 Austria Top 40)	73
Belgium (Ultratop 50 Flanders Dance)	32
Belgium (Ultratop 50 Wallonia)	43
Belgium (Ultratop 50 Wallonia Dance)	43
Czech Republic Airplay (ČNS IFPI)	62
Hungary (Single Top 40)	5
Italy (Musica e dischi)	27
Slovakia Airplay (ČNS IFPI)	71
Switzerland (Schweizer Hitparade)	73
UK Singles (Official Charts)	119
US Dance Singles Sales (Billboard)	3

== Johnny Cash version ==
"Personal Jesus"

Single by Johnny Cash

from the album American IV: The Man Comes Around
- B-side: "Hurt"
- Released: September 30, 2002
- Studio: American Recording Studios
- Genre: Country; gospel; boogie rock
- Length: 3:19
- Label: American; Universal
- Songwriter: Martin Gore
- Producer: Rick Rubin

Johnny Cash singles chronology
"The Man Comes Around" (2002)	"Personal Jesus" (2002)	"Hurt" (2003)

Music Video
- "Personal Jesus" by Johnny Cash on YouTube

In 2002, American country singer Johnny Cash covered "Personal Jesus" for his sixty-seventh studio album American IV: The Man Comes Around. For the song, Rick Rubin asked Red Hot Chili Peppers guitarist John Frusciante to re-work an acoustic version of the song, which featured a simple acoustic riff that stripped down the song to a blues style. "That's probably the most evangelical song [I've] ever recorded," said Cash, "I don't know that the writer ever meant it to be that, but that's what it is."

In 2017, Depeche Mode's lead vocalist Dave Gahan said about Cash covering the song, "I was in the studio recording a solo album, Hourglass, and Martin [Gore] rang me because he'd heard news that Johnny Cash wanted to cover it, and he was kind of umming and ahhing about it, whether to give permission, and I was like 'What are you, crazy? That's like Elvis asking, of course, you let him do it!' And he was like [mumbles] 'Oh yes, well, I guess,' in his very Martin sort of way." He concluded, "And it's a great version, just fantastic. But it really propelled the song to another dimension. Our version is our version, and it always changes a little bit live, the way it swings, what you do with it. And you can do a lot with it because it's a great rock & roll song."

=== Charts ===
Chart	Peak position
UK Singles (Official Charts)	39

== Marilyn Manson version ==
"Personal Jesus"

Single by Marilyn Manson

from the album Lest We Forget: The Best Of
- Released: 28 September 2004
- Genre: Industrial rock
- Length: 3:19 (radio edit); 4:06 (album version)
- Label: Interscope; Nothing
- Songwriter: Martin Gore
- Producers: Marilyn Manson; Tim Skold

Marilyn Manson singles chronology
"This Is the New Shit" (2003)	"Personal Jesus" (2004)	"The Nobodies: 2005 Against All Gods Remix" (2005)

Music video
- "Personal Jesus" by Marilyn Manson on YouTube

American rock band Marilyn Manson released their cover version of the track as the only previously unreleased recording included on their greatest hits album Lest We Forget: The Best Of (2004). Band leader Marilyn Manson explained to MTV that he decided to cover "Personal Jesus" as: "I thought if I had to write a song, [the lyrics of 'Personal Jesus' are] exactly what I would say. ... I think it takes a little more of an ironic tone when you put it in context with what's going on today." He additionally described the original song and Depeche Mode's music in general as hypnotic, sexy and inspirational. Its music video was directed by Manson and Nathan Cox. The song won an award in the 'pop' category of the 2005 BMI Film & TV Awards, while its music video received two nominations at the 2005 Music Video Production Awards. As of 2020, the track has sold over 78,000 physical and digital copies in the United Kingdom, where it was also streamed over 4 million times.

=== Formats and track listings ===
- European 7-inch and US 10-inch single
1. "Personal Jesus" – 4:06
2. "Personal Jesus" (Rude Photo Motor Remix) – 5:50
- CD single
1. "Personal Jesus" – 4:06
2. "This Is the New Shit" (Remix by Sergio Galoyan) – 4:28
- International maxi single
1. "Personal Jesus" – 4:06
2. "Mobscene Replet" (Mea Culpa Mix by Bitteren Ende) – 4:35
3. "Personal Jesus" (Rude Photo Motor Remix) – 5:50
4. "Personal Jesus" (Enhanced Video)
- UK maxi single
1. "Personal Jesus" – 4:06
2. "New Shit Invective" (Obiter Dictum Mix by Bitteren Ende) – 4:25
3. "Mobscene Replet" (Mea Culpa Mix by Bitteren Ende) – 4:35
4. "Personal Jesus" (Enhanced Video)

=== Charts ===
==== Weekly charts ====
Weekly chart performance for "Personal Jesus"
Chart (2004)	Peak position
Australia (ARIA)	30
Austria (Ö3 Austria Top 40)	10
Belgium (Ultratip Bubbling Under Flanders)	10
Belgium (Ultratop 50 Wallonia)	38
Denmark (Tracklisten)	8
Europe (Eurochart Hot 100)	12
Finland (Suomen virallinen lista)	20
France (SNEP)	62
Germany (GfK)	11
Greece (IFPI)	21
Hungary (Dance Top 40)	34
Hungary (Single Top 40)	8
Ireland (IRMA)	46
Italy (FIMI)	10
Netherlands (Single Top 100)	89
Norway (VG-lista)	15
Scottish Singles Sales (Official Charts)	15
Sweden (Sverigetopplistan)	39
Switzerland (Schweizer Hitparade)	13
UK Singles (Official Charts)	13
UK Rock & Metal (Official Charts)	2
US Alternative Airplay (Billboard)	12
US Dance Club Songs (Billboard) Felix da Housecat mixes	35
US Mainstream Rock Airplay (Billboard)	20

==== Year-end charts ====
Year-end chart performance for "Personal Jesus"
Chart (2005)	Position
US Modern Rock Tracks (Billboard)	68

== Other versions ==
The British singer Jamelia used a sample from the song for her 2006 single "Beware of the Dog". American singer and actress Hilary Duff also used a "Personal Jesus" sample as the basis of her 2008 single "Reach Out".

In 2013, former Van Halen frontman Sammy Hagar covered the song on his sixteenth studio album Sammy Hagar & Friends. Hagar commented at the time: "I've gotta tell you, as I studied that lick I went 'That is a blues fricken' lick.' For an electronic band, some bizarre alternative electronic band, that's a badass blues lick. And I played it on guitar and said, 'This is it.' And Neal Schon, the intro on that thing, the licks Neal's playing, it's in high gear. I can't wait till the Depeche Mode guys hear it. I think when they hear it they're going to say, 'Sammy Hagar, that (expletive) rock and roll freak?' Haha. They've gotta like it. It's a blues song and it's a great lyric, a great deep, dark lyric. I can't write lyrics like that. It's too dark for me."

A lounge cover version recorded by the comedy act Richard Cheese was used as the theme song for a season 3 episode of The Leftovers.

In 2018, the English rock band Def Leppard released their own version of the song. Guitarist Phil Collen said: "Depeche Mode [started out] really poppy like a lot of bands that disappeared, then all of a sudden they started doing things like 'Personal Jesus' – and it was like 'woah' … It has an element of cool that was different from the earlier Depeche Mode stuff. I found it really inspiring how this article that said Depeche Mode sold out more than [Justin] Bieber or Taylor Swift. We [felt] a tear of pride and joy for them – the fact that they carried on, never stopped … and it's sort of the way we see ourselves."

== See also ==
- List of cover versions of Depeche Mode songs § "Personal Jesus"

== Sources ==
- Burmeister, Dennis; Lange, Sascha (2017). Depeche Mode: Monument. New York: Akashic Books. ISBN 978-1-61775-593-4.
- Dimery, Robert (2006). Dimery, Robert (ed.). 1001 Albums You Must Hear Before You Die. Universe Publishing. ISBN 9780789313706. OCLC 70630624.
- Gittins, Ian (2018). Depeche Mode: Faith and Devotion. London: Palazzo Editions. ISBN 978-1-78675-064-8.
- Hallard, Ross (director); Lane, Phil Michael (director) (2006). Depeche Mode: 1989–90 (If You Wanna Use Guitars, Use Guitars) (DVD). Mute Records.
- Miller, Jonathan (2003). Stripped: The True Story of Depeche Mode. Omnibus Press. ISBN 1-84449-415-2.
- Thomas, Dave (1986). Depeche Mode. Bobcat Books. ISBN 0-7119-0804-4.
