= Heaven (Depeche Mode song) =

Song by Depeche Mode

Single by Depeche Mode

from the album Delta Machine
- B-side: "All That's Mine"
- Released: 31 January 2013
- Genre: Synth-rock; soft rock
- Length: 4:03
- Label: Columbia
- Songwriter: Martin L. Gore
- Producer: Ben Hillier

Depeche Mode singles chronology
"Personal Jesus 2011" (2011)	"Heaven" (2013)	"Soothe My Soul" (2013)

Music video
- "Heaven" on YouTube

Professional ratings
Review scores
Source	Rating
AllMusic	3.5/5 stars

"Heaven" is a song by English electronic music band Depeche Mode, released as the lead single from their thirteenth studio album, Delta Machine (2013). Written by Martin Gore and produced by Ben Hillier, the song was world-premiered on KROQ's morning show Kevin and Bean on 30 January 2013. The single was released digitally in most territories on 31 January 2013, and physically on 1 February.

In the United Kingdom, "Heaven" was released digitally on 17 March 2013 and physically the following day. The B-side "All That's Mine" was written by Dave Gahan and Kurt Uenala. An accompanying music video for "Heaven" was directed by Timothy Saccenti and premiered on VEVO on 1 February 2013.

In June 2013, the single was certified gold by the Federazione Industria Musicale Italiana (FIMI), denoting downloads exceeding 15,000 units in Italy. In the UK, by contrast, the single reached #60, the first initial single from a Depeche Mode album to fail to reach the UK Top 40. (Note: "Dreaming of Me", while charting at only #57, was not an "official" track on Speak & Spell)

== Background and composition ==
According to Martin Gore in an interview, "'Heaven' was written on a piano. I had all the chords, and everything all worked out on the piano and the whole vocal melody, and the lyrics worked out before I went anywhere near a computer." Additionally, Andy Fletcher stated that the demo was not very different to the final besides the lead vocal being done by Dave Gahan instead of Gore.

Gahan has expressed his appreciation to the song in the same interview, expressing, "Of all the incredible songs that Martin has written over the years that I have been lucky enough to sing and perform, once in a while a song comes along—hopefully I'll write one of those myself one day—that's something I have to sing. It's something I want to sing." He further states, "To me, 'Heaven' is one of the reasons why I still make music."

== Music video ==
The music video for "Heaven" was directed by Timothy Saccenti and filmed in November 2012 at the Marigny Opera House, a former Catholic church in New Orleans's Faubourg Marigny. Previously, Saccenti had directed the "In-Studio Collage 2012" video for "Angel" that premiered at the band's press conference in Paris on 23 October 2012.

The video's look was inspired by Terrence Malick's 2011 film The Tree of Life, with its beautiful yet twisted, dark imagery. "Mainly it's a performance video, which we haven't done in a long time", Gahan stated. The video debuted on VEVO on 1 February 2013.

== Track listing ==
All tracks are written by Martin L. Gore, except where noted

CD and iTunes single
No.	Title	Writer(s)	Length
1.	"Heaven" (album version)		4:03
2.	"All That's Mine" (deluxe album version)	Dave Gahan, Kurt Uenala	3:23
Total length:			7:26

CD maxi single and iTunes EP
No.	Title	Length
1.	"Heaven" (album version)	4:03
2.	"Heaven" (Owlle remix)	4:48
3.	"Heaven" (Steps to Heaven rmx)	6:07
4.	"Heaven" (Blawan remix)	5:43
5.	"Heaven" (Matthew Dear vs. Audion vocal mix)	5:59

Limited 12" single
No.	Title	Length
1.	"Heaven" (Blawan dub)	7:14
2.	"Heaven" (Owlle remix)	4:48
3.	"Heaven" (Steps to Heaven voxdub)	6:11
4.	"Heaven" (Matthew Dear vs. Audion instrumental mix)	6:10

This is the first Depeche Mode single since 1982 to drop the "BONG" prefix.

== Credits and personnel ==
Credits adapted from CD single liner notes.

- Christoffer Berg – programming
- Anton Corbijn – design, photography
- Flood – mixing
- Ben Hillier – production
- Rob Kirwan – mix engineering
- Ferg Peterkin – engineering
- Bunt Stafford-Clark – mastering
- Kurt Uenala – additional programming, vocal recording

== Charts ==
=== Weekly charts ===
Weekly chart performance for "Heaven"
Chart (2013)	Peak position
Austria (Ö3 Austria Top 40)	22
Belgium (Ultratop 50 Flanders)	50
Belgium (Ultratop 50 Wallonia)	12
Denmark (Tracklisten)	27
France (SNEP)	27
Germany (GfK)	2
Hungary (Rádiós Top 40)	14
Hungary (Single Top 40)	1
Ireland (IRMA)	84
Italy (FIMI)	19
Netherlands (Single Top 100)	95
Spain (Promusicae)	11
Switzerland (Schweizer Hitparade)	18
UK Singles (Official Charts)	60
US Hot Singles Sales (Billboard)	2
US Hot Rock & Alternative Songs (Billboard)	43
US Alternative Airplay (Billboard)	33
US Dance Club Songs (Billboard)	1

=== Year-end charts ===
Year-end chart performance for "Heaven"
Chart (2013)	Position
Hungary (Rádiós Top 40)	92
Italy (FIMI)	95
US Hot Dance Club Songs (Billboard)	29

== Release history ==
Release dates for "Heaven"
Region	Date	Format(s)	Label
France	31 January 2013	Digital download	Sony Music
Germany	31 January 2013	Digital download	Sony Music
United States	31 January 2013	Digital download	Columbia Records
Germany	1 February 2013	CD single; CD maxi single	Sony Music
United States	5 February 2013	CD single; CD maxi single	Columbia Records
France	18 February 2013	CD single; CD maxi single	Sony Music
Germany	22 February 2013	12" single	Sony Music
United States	26 February 2013	12" single	Columbia Records
United Kingdom	17 March 2013	Digital download	Sony Music
United Kingdom	18 March 2013	CD single; CD maxi single; 12" single	Sony Music

== See also ==
- List of Billboard Dance Club Songs number ones of 2013
