= Soothe My Soul =

Single by Depeche Mode

from the album Delta Machine
- B-side: "Goodbye" (Gesaffelstein remix)
- Released: 6 May 2013
- Genre: Synth-pop
- Length: 5:21 (album version); 3:57 (radio edit)
- Label: Columbia
- Songwriter(s): Martin L. Gore
- Producer(s): Ben Hillier

Depeche Mode singles chronology
"Heaven" (2013)	"Soothe My Soul" (2013)	"Should Be Higher" (2013)

Music video
- "Soothe My Soul" on YouTube

"Soothe My Soul" is a song by English electronic music band Depeche Mode from their thirteenth studio album, Delta Machine (2013). The song was written by Martin L. Gore and produced by Ben Hillier. It was released as the album's second single by Columbia Records on 10 May 2013 in Germany, 13 May internationally, 14 May in North America, and 10 June in the United Kingdom. The music video was directed by Warren Fu and premiered on 28 March 2013.

== Track listing ==
- Digital download – remix
1. "Soothe My Soul" (Steve Angello vs. Jacques Lu Cont remix) – 7:02
- CD single
1. "Soothe My Soul" (radio edit) – 3:57
2. "Goodbye" (Gesaffelstein remix) – 3:51
- CD maxi single
1. "Soothe My Soul" (Steve Angello vs. Jacques Lu Cont remix) – 7:02
2. "Soothe My Soul" (Tom Furse – the Horrors remix) – 4:55
3. "Soothe My Soul" (Billy F Gibbons and Joe Hardy remix) – 5:16
4. "Soothe My Soul" (Joris Delacroix remix) – 6:56
5. "Soothe My Soul" (Black Asteroid remix) – 5:35
6. "Soothe My Soul" (Gregor Tresher Soothed remix) – 5:59
- 12-inch single

A1. "Soothe My Soul" (Steve Angello vs. Jacques Lu Cont remix)
A2. "Soothe My Soul" (Matador remix) – 8:15
B1. "Soothe My Soul" (Destructo remix) – 6:03
B2. "Soothe My Soul" (Gregor Tresher remix) – 7:07

== Charts ==
Weekly chart performance for "Soothe My Soul"
Chart (2013)	Peak position
Belgium (Ultratip Bubbling Under Flanders)	10
Belgium (Ultratip Bubbling Under Wallonia)	9
France (SNEP)	45
Germany (GfK)	22
Hungary (Single Top 40)	1
Italy (FIMI)	67
Mexico Ingles Airplay (Billboard)	21
UK Singles (OCC)	88
US Alternative Airplay (Billboard)	27
US Dance Club Songs (Billboard)	7

== Release history ==
Region	Date	Format(s)	Label
Various	6 May 2013	Digital download – remix	Size
Austria	10 May 2013	CD single	Columbia
Germany	10 May 2013	CD single	Columbia
Switzerland	10 May 2013	CD single	Columbia
Various	13 May 2013	CD single	Columbia
North America	14 May 2013	CD single	Columbia
United Kingdom	10 June 2013	CD single	Columbia
Various	10 June 2013	12-inch single	Columbia
North America	11 June 2013	12-inch single	Columbia
