= Delta Machine =

2013 studio album by Depeche Mode

Studio album by Depeche Mode
- Released: 22 March 2013
- Recorded: March–October 2012
- Studios: Sound Design (Santa Barbara, California); Jungle City (New York City)
- Genres: Electropop; industrial
- Length: 57:55
- Labels: Columbia; Mute
- Producer: Ben Hillier

Depeche Mode chronology
Remixes 2: 81–11 (2011)	Delta Machine (2013)	Spirit (2017)

Singles from Delta Machine
- 1. "Heaven" Released: 31 January 2013; 2. "Soothe My Soul" Released: 6 May 2013; 3. "Should Be Higher" Released: 11 October 2013

Delta Machine is the thirteenth studio album by the English electronic music band Depeche Mode, released on 22 March 2013 by Columbia and Mute Records. It is the band's first album released under Columbia. Recorded in 2012 in Santa Barbara, California, and New York City, the album was produced by Ben Hillier and mixed by Flood, who had previously worked with the band on their albums Violator (1990) and Songs of Faith and Devotion (1993). A deluxe edition was also released, containing a bonus disc with four bonus tracks, as well as a 28-page hardcover book including photos by Anton Corbijn.

"Heaven" was released as the album's lead single on 31 January 2013. The second single from the album, "Soothe My Soul", was released on 10 May 2013, followed by "Should Be Higher" on 11 October 2013. Following the album's release, Depeche Mode embarked on the Delta Machine Tour, which commenced in Nice, France, on 4 May 2013, and concluded in Moscow on 7 March 2014.

== Background and composition ==
Thematically, much of the album is written from a personal point of view. Martin Gore said that the opening track "Welcome to My World" is "written from a much more personal point of view. I feel more at peace with my life and much better physically". Dave Gahan also explained how getting cancer affected his songwriting on the track "Secret to the End", inspiring the line "is this the end?". Lyrically, the song "Slow" is about "the joy of sex" as Gore described in an interview with Steffen Rüth. Gahan wrote about his struggle with substance abuse on the track "Should Be Higher" explaining that he won't even drink a glass of wine anymore because it could open a Pandora's box. Gore also felt that "Goodbye" sounds like a Beatles song but was hesitant to make that comparison.

According to Gahan, Delta Machine marks the end of the trilogy of records that Depeche Mode were recording with producer Ben Hillier, though the sound of this album differs from past albums. The album is Gore and Gahan's thematic continuation to a dark, gloomy and bluesy aesthetic that Depeche Mode had started to explore in the late 1980s. The Quietus writer Luke Turner viewed it as the band's "most powerful, gothic, twisted, electronic album since Violator". The sound of the album is also notable for its use of modular synthesisers. While "Welcome to My World" was built around a synth loop, other tracks such as "Heaven" were entirely written on the piano. The band debated leaving the song "My Little Universe" off the album due to its more techno sound that made it stand out. The song was also massively changed from Gore's demo. The song "Slow" was originally written by Gore as far back as the early 1990s for Songs of Faith and Devotion, but was pushed aside until the Delta Machine sessions taking on a much more bluesy sound. Currently it is the first song written by Martin Gore known to have been written and shelved before eventually seeing use on an album years after the time of its writing.

== Critical reception ==
Professional ratings
Aggregate scores
Source	Rating
AnyDecentMusic?	6.5/10
Metacritic	65/100
Review scores
Source	Rating
AllMusic	3/5 stars
Clash	8/10
Entertainment Weekly	A−
The Guardian	3/5 stars
The Independent	2/5 stars
NME	5/10
The Observer	2/5 stars
Pitchfork	5.0/10
Rolling Stone	3.5/5 stars
The Times	4/5 stars

Delta Machine received generally positive reviews from music critics. At Metacritic, which assigns a normalised rating out of 100 to reviews from mainstream publications, the album received an average score of 65, based on 33 reviews. Entertainment Weekly's Kyle Anderson hailed Delta Machine as "the strongest album the group has put out this century" and praised the work of collaborator Christoffer Berg, stating he "lends a long-lost toughness that runs through much of Delta". The Times critic Will Hodgkinson commented that the album "finds the band striking just the right balance between the chirpy electro-pop of their early days and the harsh industrial dissonance of the later albums". Benjamin Boles of Now proclaimed it as "the best album of [Depeche Mode's] career" and found that the songs "find the band leaping in thrillingly unexpected directions and landing on their feet every time."

Laurence Green of musicOMH opined that the album "lays the template for some of the band's most vigorous, energetic material in 15 years", concluding, "In what has always been a frighteningly consistent career, Delta Machine stands there amongst the band's finest work." Mat Smith of Clash noted, "The freshness comes through in the delivery, which is as loose as electronic music permits, delivered with the bluesy rawness that frontman Dave Gahan wanted from the album." AllMusic editor David Jeffries described the album as "a well-written [...] and lusciously recorded set of serpentine siren songs", adding, "Those who don't buy into the dark eroticism that drives the album will be disappointed as well, but don't mistake 'dour' for 'down for it' when it comes dressed-in-leather pants, because the simmering and dark Delta Machine is certainly the latter." Rolling Stone's Jon Dolan stated that the album "celebrates brooding faith and slippery solace without scrimping on Depeche's trademark blackstrobe punishment."

Caroline Sullivan of The Guardian expressed that on Delta Machine, "Depeche Mode are as hamstrung as ever by their refusal to admit even a chink of light into their world of gloom [...] The flip side of the coin is that the austere music that accompanies all this darkness is often very beautiful", commending the band for their ability to "balance lushness and minimalism to stunning effect". In a mixed review for Pitchfork, Douglas Wolk criticised the album's lyrics, while concluding, "There is not a single moment of shock or freshness on Delta Machine, and it's enormously frustrating to hear what was once a band of futurists so deeply mired in resisting change." Andy Gill of The Independent panned Delta Machine as the band's "weakest album in some while" and felt that "[t]he more melodramatically that David Gahan invites us to have him 'penetrate your soul... bleed into your dreams', the more the sculpted electronic backdrops seem like curtains hiding the puniness of the wizards wielding the machines." The Observer's Kitty Empire viewed that "a kind of blood-red synthetic blues bubbles to the fore; it blows hot and cold." Emily Mackay of the NME commented, "Things improve with the defter 'Soft Touch/Raw Nerve' and 'Soothe My Soul', but Delta Machine sounds like it's just warming up."

=== Accolades ===
Publication	Accolade	Year	Rank
The Telegraph	Highest Rated Albums of 2013	2013	48
NOW Magazine	Highest Rated Albums of 2013	2013	4

== Commercial performance ==
Delta Machine debuted at number two on the UK Albums Chart, selling 28,450 copies in its first week; it is Depeche Mode's 16th album to reach the UK top 10. It slipped to number 14 the following week, selling 7,146 copies. In the United States, the album entered the Billboard 200 at number six with 52,000 copies sold in its opening week, earning the band their seventh top 10 album on the chart.

The album debuted at number one on the German Albums Chart with first-week sales of 142,000 units. In France, Delta Machine debuted on the French Albums Chart at number two, selling 52,000 copies. The album sold 8,200 copies to debut at number two on the Canadian Albums Chart.

== Track listing ==
All tracks are written by Martin L. Gore, except where noted. All lead vocals by Dave Gahan, except where noted.

No.	Title	Writer(s)	Lead vocals	Length
1.	"Welcome to My World"			4:56
2.	"Angel"			3:57
3.	"Heaven"			4:03
4.	"Secret to the End"	Dave Gahan; Kurt Uenala		5:12
5.	"My Little Universe"			4:24
6.	"Slow"			3:45
7.	"Broken"	Gahan; Uenala		3:58
8.	"The Child Inside"		Gore	4:16
9.	"Soft Touch/Raw Nerve"			3:26
10.	"Should Be Higher"	Gahan; Uenala		5:04
11.	"Alone"			4:29
12.	"Soothe My Soul"		Gahan; Gore	5:22
13.	"Goodbye"			5:03
Total length:				57:55

Deluxe edition bonus disc
No.	Title	Writer(s)	Lead vocals	Length
1.	"Long Time Lie"	Gore; Gahan		4:25
2.	"Happens All the Time"	Gahan; Uenala		4:20
3.	"Always"		Gore	5:07
4.	"All That's Mine"	Gahan; Uenala		3:23
Total length:				17:15

iTunes Store deluxe edition pre-order bonus track
No.	Title	Length
18.	"Heaven" (live studio session)	3:52

== Personnel ==
Credits adapted from the liner notes of the deluxe edition of Delta Machine.

=== Depeche Mode ===
- Andy Fletcher
- Dave Gahan
- Martin Gore

=== Additional musicians ===
- Christoffer Berg – programming
- Kurt Uenala – additional programming

=== Technical ===
- Ben Hillier – production
- Ferg Peterkin – engineering
- Kurt Uenala – vocal recording
- Tomas del Toro-Diaz – engineering assistance
- Will Loomis – engineering assistance
- Dan Tobiason – engineering assistance
- Flood – mixing at Assault & Battery 2 (London)
- Rob Kirwan – mix engineering
- Drew Smith – mix assistance
- Bunt Stafford-Clark – mastering at Pierce Rooms (London)

=== Artwork ===
- Anton Corbijn – design, photography, backprojection images
- Anja Grabert – backprojection images

== Charts ==
=== Weekly charts ===
Weekly chart performance for Delta Machine
Chart (2013)	Peak position
Australian Albums (ARIA)	16
Austrian Albums (Ö3 Austria)	1
Belgian Albums (Ultratop Flanders)	2
Belgian Albums (Ultratop Wallonia)	1
Canadian Albums (Billboard)	2
Croatian Albums (HDU)	1
Czech Albums (ČNS IFPI)	1
Danish Albums (Hitlisten)	1
Dutch Albums (Album Top 100)	3
Estonian Albums (Raadio 2)	1
Finnish Albums (Suomen virallinen lista)	3
French Albums (SNEP)	2
German Albums (Offizielle Top 100)	1
Greek Albums (IFPI)	2
Hungarian Albums (MAHASZ)	1
Irish Albums (IRMA)	2
Italian Albums (FIMI)	1
Japanese Albums (Oricon)	51
Mexican Albums (Top 100 Mexico)	3
New Zealand Albums (RMNZ)	24
Norwegian Albums (VG-lista)	2
Polish Albums (ZPAV)	1
Portuguese Albums (AFP)	3
Scottish Albums (Official Charts)	3
Slovenian Albums (Val 202)	2
South Korean Albums (Gaon)	77
Spanish Albums (Promusicae)	3
Swedish Albums (Sverigetopplistan)	1
Swiss Albums (Schweizer Hitparade)	1
UK Albums (Official Charts)	2
US Billboard 200	6
US Top Alternative Albums (Billboard)	1
US Top Rock Albums (Billboard)	1

=== Year-end charts ===
Year-end chart performance for Delta Machine
Chart (2013)	Position
Austrian Albums (Ö3 Austria)	37
Belgian Albums (Ultratop Flanders)	41
Belgian Albums (Ultratop Wallonia)	11
Danish Albums (Hitlisten)	26
Finnish Albums (Suomen virallinen lista)	36
French Albums (SNEP)	26
German Albums (Offizielle Top 100)	7
Hungarian Albums (MAHASZ)	15
Italian Albums (FIMI)	18
Polish Albums (ZPAV)	4
Spanish Albums (PROMUSICAE)	28
Swedish Albums (Sverigetopplistan)	43
Swedish Albums & Compilations (Sverigetopplistan)	51
Swiss Albums (Schweizer Hitparade)	11
UK Albums (OCC)	152
US Top Alternative Albums (Billboard)	40
US Top Rock Albums (Billboard)	62

== Certifications ==
Certifications for Delta Machine
Region	Certification	Certified units/sales
Austria (IFPI Austria)	Gold	7,500^{*}
Finland (Musiikkituottajat)	Gold	10,250
France (SNEP)	Platinum	100,000^{*}
Germany (BVMI)	3× Gold	300,000^{^}
Hungary (MAHASZ)	2× Platinum	4,000^{^}
Italy (FIMI)	Platinum	60,000^{*}
Poland (ZPAV)	2× Platinum	40,000^{*}
Spain (Promusicae)	Gold	20,000^{^}
Sweden (GLF)	Gold	20,000^{‡}
Switzerland (IFPI Switzerland)	Platinum	20,000^{^}
United Kingdom (BPI)	Silver	68,437
^{*} Sales figures based on certification alone.^{^} Shipments figures based on certification alone.^{‡} Sales+streaming figures based on certification alone.

== Release history ==
Release dates and formats for Delta Machine
Region	Date	Format	Edition	Label	Ref(s)
Germany	22 March 2013	CD; LP; digital download	Standard; deluxe	Sony	
Ireland	22 March 2013	CD; LP; digital download	Standard; deluxe	Sony	
France	25 March 2013	CD; LP; digital download	Standard; deluxe	Sony	
United Kingdom	25 March 2013	CD; LP; digital download	Standard; deluxe	Sony	
Italy	26 March 2013	CD; LP; digital download	Standard; deluxe	Sony	
United States	26 March 2013	CD; LP; digital download	Standard; deluxe	Columbia; Mute	
Japan	27 March 2013	CD; digital download	Standard; deluxe	Sony	
Australia	29 March 2013	CD; digital download	Standard; deluxe	Sony	

== See also ==
- List of number-one albums of 2013 (Poland)
- List of number-one hits of 2013 (Austria)
- List of number-one hits of 2013 (Germany)
- List of number-one hits of 2013 (Italy)
- List of number-one hits of 2013 (Switzerland)
