= List of awards and nominations received by Depeche Mode =

Depeche Mode awards and nominations
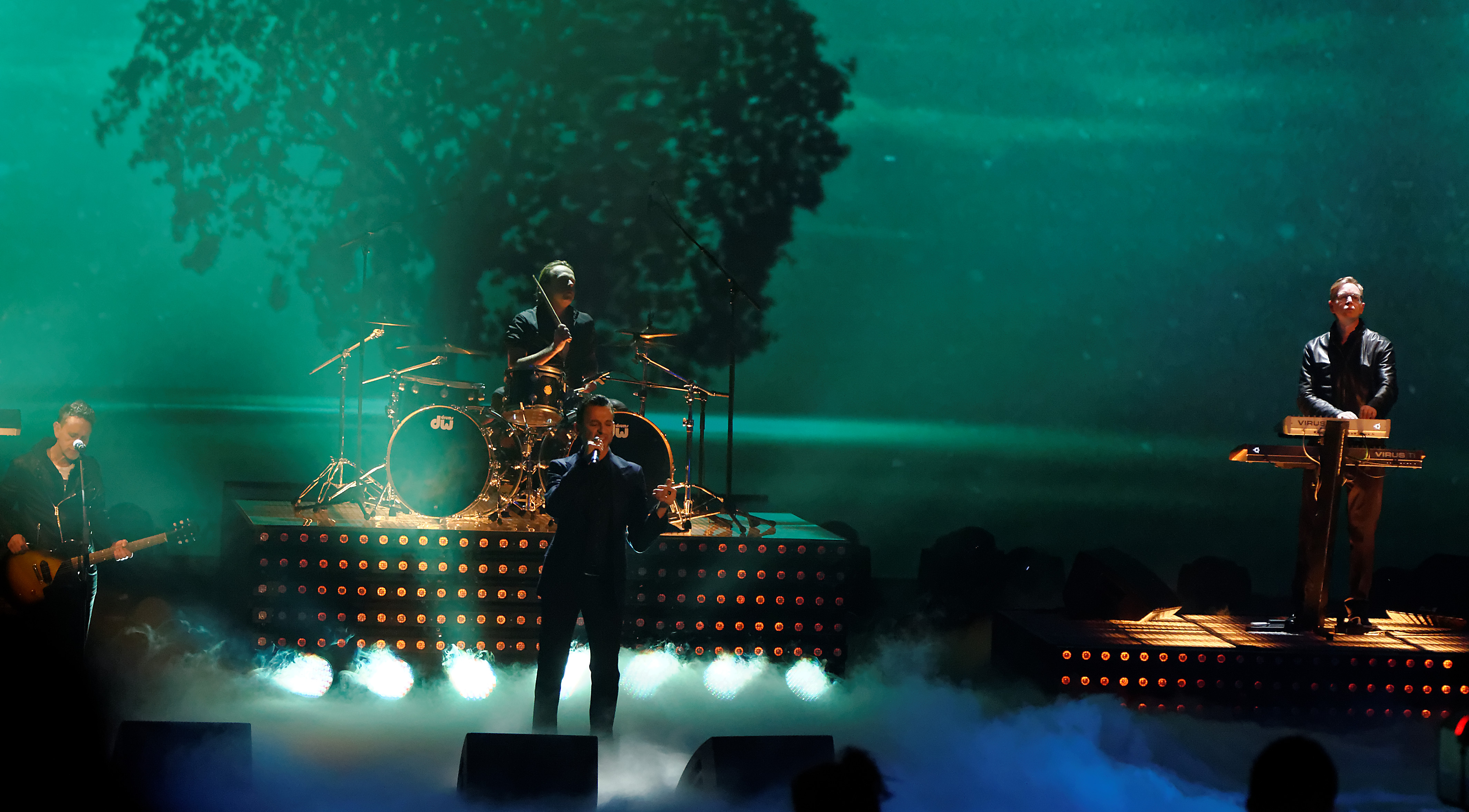
- Depeche Mode performing at Wetten, dass..?, 2013
Awards and nominations
Award	Wins	Nominations
Billboard	0	11
Brit	1	3
Echo	2	9
Grammy	0	5
Ivor Novello	1	1
Meteor Music	0	1
MTV Europe	1	3
MTV VMA	0	2
Q	1	2
UK MVA	1	2
Viva Comet	1	0

Totals (Note: Certain award groups do not simply award one winner. They acknowledge several different recipients, have runners-up, and have third place. Since this is a specific recognition and is different from losing an award, runner-up mentions are considered wins in this award tally. For simplification and to avoid errors, each award in this list has been presumed to have had a prior nomination.)
- Wins: 32
- Nominations: 112

English electronic music band Depeche Mode has received five Grammy Award nominations. The band's first Grammy nomination occurred when Devotional was nominated for Grammy Award for Best Long Form Music Video in 1995. Depeche Mode has also received Grammy nominations for Best Dance Recording for "I Feel Loved", "Suffer Well" and "Wrong". On 2 November 2006, Depeche Mode received the MTV Europe Music Award in the Best Group category, the band won the first Q magazine "Innovation Award" on 22 October 2002. "Enjoy the Silence" won 'Best British single' at the 1991 Brit Awards. In 2020, January, Depeche Mode was announced among the four inductees of the 35th Rock and Roll Hall of Fame inductees.

== ASCAP Pop Music Awards ==
Year	Nominee / work	Award	Result	Ref.
1991	"Enjoy the Silence"	Most Performed Song	Won	

== Antville Music Video Awards ==
Year	Nominee / work	Award	Result
2009	"Wrong"	Best Narrative Video	Won
2009	"Wrong"	Best Cinematography	Won

== BMI London Awards ==
Year	Nominee / work	Award	Result	Ref.
2002	"Dream On"	Pop Award	Won	
2005	"Personal Jesus"	Pop Award	Won	
2007	"Precious"	Pop Award	Won	
2009	"Enjoy the Silence"	3 Million Award	Won	
2021	"Enjoy the Silence"	5 Million Award	Won	

== BT Digital Music Awards ==
Year	Nominee / work	Award	Result	Ref.
2002	www.depechemode.com	People's Choice Award	Nominated	

== Beatport Music Awards ==
Year	Nominee / work	Award	Result
2010	"Hole to Feed" (Popof vocal mix)	Best Techno Track	Nominated

== Billboard Music Awards ==
Year	Nominee / work	Award	Result	Ref.
1985	Themselves	Top Hot 100 Artist	Nominated	
1985	Themselves	Top Billboard 200 Artist	Nominated	
1985	Themselves	Top Billboard 200 Artist – Duo/Group	Nominated	
1985	Some Great Reward	Top Billboard 200 Album	Nominated	
1987	Themselves	Top Dance Club Play Artist	Nominated	
1987	"Strangelove"	Top Dance Club Play Single	Nominated	
1987	"Strangelove"	Top Dance Sales 12' Single	Nominated	
2007	Themselves	Top Electronic Artist	Nominated	
2007	The Best of Depeche Mode Volume 1	Top Electronic Album	Nominated	
2009	Sounds of the Universe	Top Electronic Album	Nominated	
2009	Themselves	Top Electronic Artist	Nominated	

== Bravo Otto Awards ==
Year	Nominee / work	Award	Result
1986	Themselves	Best Rock Group (Bronze)	Won
1987	Themselves	Best Rock Group (Bronze)	Won

== Brit Awards ==
Year	Nominee / work	Award	Result
1982	Themselves	Best British Newcomer	Nominated
1991	"Enjoy the Silence"	Best British Single	Won
1991	"Enjoy the Silence"	Best British Video	Nominated
1994	"I Feel You"	Best British Video	Nominated

== Camerimage ==
Year	Nominee / work	Award	Result	Ref.
2009	"Wrong"	Best Music Video	Nominated	
2009	"Wrong"	Best Cinematography	Won	

== Classic Pop Readers' Awards ==
Year	Nominee / work	Award	Result	Ref.
2018	Themselves	Group of the Year	Nominated	
2019	Themselves	Group of the Year	Nominated	
2020	Black Celebration / Music for the Masses: The 12″ Singles	Compilation of the Year	Nominated	

== D&AD Awards ==
Year	Nominee / work	Award	Result	Ref.
1988	"Behind the Wheel"	Individual Video	Wood Pencil	
1999	The Singles 86>98	Individual Compact Discs, Tapes or Record Sleeves	Wood Pencil	
2010	"Wrong"	Music Video	Graphite Pencil	

== Echo Award ==
Year	Nominee / work	Award	Result
1998	Themselves	Best International Group	Nominated
1999	Themselves	Best International Group	Nominated
2002	Themselves	Best International Group	Nominated
2006	Themselves	Best International Group	Nominated
2007	Themselves	Best International Group	Nominated
2007	Touring the Angel: Live in Milan	Music DVD of the Year	Nominated
2010	Sounds of the Universe	Album of the Year	Nominated
2010	Themselves	Best International Group	Won
2014	Themselves	Best International Group	Won
2014	Delta Machine	Album of the Year	Nominated
2018	Themselves	Best International Group	Nominated

== GAFFA Awards ==
=== Denmark GAFFA Awards ===
Delivered since 1991, the GAFFA Awards are a Danish award that rewards popular music by the magazine of the same name.

Year	Nominee / work	Award	Result	Ref.
2001	Themselves	Foreign Live Name	Nominated	
2005	Themselves	Best Foreign Band	Nominated	
2005	Playing the Angel	Best Foreign Album	Nominated	

=== Sweden GAFFA Awards ===
Delivered since 2010, the GAFFA Awards (Swedish: GAFFA Priset) are a Swedish award that rewards popular music awarded by the magazine of the same name.

Year	Nominee / work	Award	Result	Ref.
2018	Themselves	Best Foreign Band	Nominated	

== Grammy Awards ==
Year	Nominee / work	Award	Result
1995	Devotional	Best Long Form Music Video	Nominated
2001	"I Feel Loved"	Best Dance Recording	Nominated
2007	"Suffer Well"	Best Dance Recording	Nominated
2010	Sounds of the Universe	Best Alternative Music Album	Nominated
2010	"Wrong"	Best Short Form Music Video	Nominated

== Hungarian Music Awards ==
Year	Nominee / work	Award	Result
1998	Ultra	Best Foreign Album	Nominated
2001	Exciter	Best Foreign Rock Album	Nominated
2005	Remixes 81–04	Best Foreign Dance Album	Nominated
2006	Playing the Angel	Best Foreign Dance Album	Nominated
2010	Sounds of the Universe	Pop-Rock Album of the Year	Nominated
2012	Themselves	Electronic Music Production of the Year	Nominated
2014	Delta Machine	Pop-Rock Album of the Year	Nominated

== International Dance Music Awards ==
Year	Nominee / work	Award	Result
2005	Remixes 81–04	Best CD Compilation	Nominated
2006	Themselves	Best Dance Artist (Group)	Won
2007	Themselves	Best Dance Artist (Group)	Won
2010	"Wrong"	Best Electro Track	Nominated
2010	"Wrong"	Best Music Video	Nominated

== Ivor Novello Awards ==
Year	Nominee / work	Award	Result
1994	"I Feel You"	International Hit of the Year	Nominated
1999	Martin Gore	International Achievement	Won

== Lunas del Auditorio ==
Year	Nominee / work	Award	Result
2007	Themselves	Electronic Music	Won
2010	Themselves	Best Rock in Foreign Language	Nominated
2018	Themselves	Best Rock in Foreign Language	Won

== MTV Europe Music Awards ==
Year	Nominee / work	Award	Result
2001	Themselves	Best Band Website	Nominated
2002	Themselves	Best Live Act	Nominated
2006	Themselves	Best Group	Won
2007	Themselves	Best Inter Act	Nominated

== MTV Russian Music Awards ==
Year	Nominee / work	Award	Result
2006	Themselves	Best International Act	Nominated

== MTV Video Music Awards ==
Year	Nominee / work	Award	Result
1990	"Personal Jesus"	Best Post-Modern Video	Nominated
1993	"I Feel You"	Best Group Video	Nominated

== Meteor Music Awards ==
Year	Nominee / work	Award	Result
2006	Playing the Angel	Best International Album	Nominated

== MidemNet Awards ==
Year	Nominee / work	Award	Result
2001	Themselves	Best Artist Site Award	Won

== Music Television Awards ==
Year	Nominee / work	Award	Result
1993	Songs of Faith and Devotion	Best Album	Nominated
1993	Themselves	Best Group	Nominated
1997	Themselves	Best Alternative	Nominated
1997	Ultra	Best Album	Won
2001	Exciter	Best Album	Nominated
2001	Themselves	Best Group	Nominated
2006	Themselves	Best Group	Won
2006	Themselves	Best Alternative	Nominated
2006	Playing the Angel	Best Album	Nominated

== Music Video Production Awards ==
Year	Nominee / work	Award	Result
2012	"Personal Jesus"	Best Alternative Video	Nominated
2013	"Soothe My Soul"	Best Director of a Band	Nominated

== NRJ Music Awards ==
Year	Nominee / work	Award	Result	Ref.
2002	Themselves	International Duo/Group of the Year	Nominated	
2002	Themselves	Music Website of the Year	Nominated	

== Pollstar Concert Industry Awards ==
Year	Nominee / work	Award	Result
1987	Themselves	Next Major Arena Headliner	Nominated

== Popkomm Award ==
Year	Nominee / work	Award	Result
2002	One Night in Paris	Popkomm Music DVD Award	Won

== Porin ==
Year	Nominee / work	Award	Result	Ref.
2011	Tour of the Universe: Barcelona 20/21.11.09	Best International Video	Won	

== Q Awards ==
Year	Nominee / work	Award	Result
2002	Themselves	Innovation Award	Won
2017	Themselves	Best Act in the World Today	Nominated
2017	Themselves	Best Live Act	Nominated

== Rober Awards Music Poll ==
Year	Nominee / work	Award	Result
2009	"Wrong"	Best Promo Video	Nominated

== Rockbjornen ==
Year	Nominee / work	Award	Result
1990	Themselves	Best Foreign Group	Won

== Rock and Roll Hall of Fame ==
Year	Nominee / work	Award	Result	Ref.
2020	Themselves	Rock and Roll Hall of Fame	Inducted	

== SER FM Awards ==
Year	Nominee / work	Award	Result	Ref.
1991	Themselves	Best Group	Won	

== Side-Line Music Awards ==
Year	Nominee / work	Award	Result	Ref.
2010	Themselves	Best Band	Nominated	
2010	Themselves	Best Live Band	Nominated	

== Smash Hits Poll Winners' Party ==
Year	Nominee / work	Award	Result
1982	A Broken Frame	Best Album	Nominated
1983	Themselves	Best Group	Nominated
1984	Themselves	Best Group	Nominated
1985	Themselves	Best Group	Nominated
1986	Themselves	Best Group	Nominated

== UK Festival Awards ==
Year	Nominee / work	Award	Result	Ref.
2006	Themselves	Best Headline Act	Nominated	

== UK Music Video Awards ==
Year	Nominee / work	Award	Result
2009	"Wrong"	Best Rock Video	Nominated
2009	"Wrong"	Best Visual Effects in a Video	Nominated
2011	"Personal Jesus 2011"	Best Alternative Video	Won

== Viva Comet Awards ==
Year	Nominee / work	Award	Result
2001	Themselves	Best International Artist	Won

== Žebřík Music Awards ==
Year	Nominee / work	Award	Result	Ref.
1997	"Barrel of a Gun"	Best International Video	Nominated	
1997	Themselves	Best International Surprise	Nominated	
1998	Themselves	Best International Surprise	Nominated	
1998	Themselves	Best International Group	Nominated	
1998	Themselves	Best International Enjoyment	Nominated	
1998	Dave Gahan	Best International Male	Nominated	
2001	Dave Gahan	Best International Male	Nominated	
2001	Dave Gahan	Best International Personality	Nominated	
2001	Themselves	Best International Group	Nominated	
2001	Themselves	Best International Surprise	Nominated	
2001	Exciter	Best International Album	Nominated	
2001	"Dream On"	Best International Song	Nominated	
2001	"I Feel Loved"	Best International Video	Nominated	
2005	"Precious"	Best International Video	Nominated	
2005	"Precious"	Best International Song	Nominated	
2005	Themselves	Best International Group	Nominated	
2005	Dave Gahan	Best International Male	Nominated	
2005	Playing the Angel	Best International Album	Nominated	
2006	Themselves	Best International Group	Nominated	
2006	"Martyr"	Best International Song	Nominated	
2006	Touring the Angel: Live in Milan	Best International Music DVD	Won	
2006	Dave Gahan	Best International Male	Won	
2007	Dave Gahan	Best International Male	Nominated	
2008	Dave Gahan	Best International Male	Nominated	
2008	Themselves	Best International Group	Nominated	
2009	Themselves	Best International Group	Won	
2009	Sounds of the Universe	Best International Album	Nominated	
2009	"Wrong"	Best International Video	Nominated	
2009	Dave Gahan	Best International Male	Nominated	
2010	Dave Gahan	Best International Male	Nominated	
2010	Themselves	Best International Group	Nominated	
2010	Sounds of the Universe	Best International Album	Nominated	
2010	Tour of the Universe: Barcelona 20/21.11.09	Best International Music DVD	Nominated	
2011	Dave Gahan	Best International Male	Won	
2013	Dave Gahan	Best International Male	Nominated	
2013	Delta Machine	Best International Album	Won	
2013	Themselves	Best International Group	Nominated	
2013	Themselves	Best International Live	Won	
2014	Themselves	Best International Live	Nominated	
2015	Dave Gahan	Best International Male	Nominated	

== Miscellaneous awards and honors ==
Year	Nominated work	Award/honor	Nominator
1989	Black Celebration	The 25 Greatest Albums of All Time (#15)	Spin
1989	"Behind the Wheel/Route 66"	100 Greatest Singles of All Time (#30)	Spin
1992	Speak & Spell	The NME's 20 Near-As-Dam-It Perfect Initial Efforts!	NME
1992	"Everything Counts"	NME Writers 100 Best Indie Singles Ever (#23)	NME
1999	"Enjoy the Silence"	Top 100 Singles of All Time (#85)	Q
2000	"Just Can't Get Enough"	100 Greatest Pop Songs (#69)	Rolling Stone
2002	101	Readers Top 100 Albums (#80)	Rolling Stone
2003	Violator	The 500 Greatest Albums of All Time (#342)	Rolling Stone
2003	"Personal Jesus"	500 Greatest Songs of All Time (#368)	Rolling Stone
2003	Violator	100 Greatest Albums Ever (#79)	Q
2003	"Personal Jesus"	1001 best songs ever (#472)	Q
2003	"Never Let Me Down Again"	1001 best songs ever (#599)	Q
2003	"Just Can't Get Enough"	The 500 Greatest Songs Since You Were Born (#62)	Blender
2003	The Singles 86>98	500 CDs You Must Own	Blender
2004	Themselves	50 Bands That Changed The World!	Q
2004	Music for the Masses	The 500 Best Albums of All Time (#194)	Rolling Stone (Germany)
2004	Songs of Faith and Devotion	The 500 Best Albums of All Time (#337)	Rolling Stone (Germany)
2004	"Personal Jesus"	The 500 Best Songs of All Time (#202)	Rolling Stone (Germany)
2005	Violator	100 Greatest Albums 1985–2005 (#103)	Spin
2005	Catching Up with Depeche Mode	The Ten Greatest Compilations of the Spin Era (#2)	Spin
2005	Violator	The Ultimate Music Collection	Q
2005	Music for the Masses	1001 Albums You Must Hear Before You Die	Robert Dimery
2005	Violator	1001 Albums You Must Hear Before You Die	Robert Dimery
2005	"Never Let Me Down Again"	1001 Songs You Must Hear Before You Die	Robert Dimery
2005	"Personal Jesus"	1001 Songs You Must Hear Before You Die	Robert Dimery
2005	"Enjoy the Silence"	1001 Songs You Must Hear Before You Die	Robert Dimery
2006	"Personal Jesus"	100 greatest songs of all time (#83)	Q
2006	"Personal Jesus"	Best of the 80's (#20)	Q
2006	"Personal Jesus"	Top 20 Albums and Singles of the Lifetime of Q Magazine (#15)	Q
2006	"Just Can't Get Enough"	100 Greatest Songs of the 80's (#66)	VH1
2006	Black Celebration	Treble's Best Albums of the 80's (#6 in 1986's top ten)	Treble
2007	Dave Gahan	100 Greatest Singers (#73)	Q
2008	Violator	Best British Albums (#15)	Q
2008	Songs of Faith and Devotion	Best British Albums (#36)	Q
2008	Violator	50 Years of Great British Music	Q
2008	Violator	Treble's Best Albums of the 90's (#1 in 1990's top ten)	Treble
2009	Tour of the Universe	Billboard's Top Tours (#20)	Billboard
2009	"Wrong"	The Top Music Videos of 2009	Pitchfork
2010	Dave Gahan	The 100 Greatest Frontmen (#27)	Q
2010	Themselves	100 greatest artists of all time (#98)	VH1
2010	"Enjoy the Silence"	The Top 200 Tracks of the 1990s (#15)	Pitchfork
2010	Violator	100 Greatest Albums of the 90s (#57)	Rolling Stone
2011	Violator	The 250 Best Albums of Q Magazine's Lifetime (#43)	Q
2011	Violator	Best albums of the 1990s (#37)	Slant Magazine
2011	"People Are People"	500 Songs That Shaped Rock and Roll	Rock and Roll Hall of Fame
2012	Music for the Masses	Best albums of the 1980s (#75)	Slant Magazine
2012	Dave Gahan	Xfm's Greatest Frontmen of All Time – The Top 20 (#3)	Xfm
2012	Violator	HMV's Best British Albums (#2)	HMV
2015	"Never Let Me Down Again"	The 200 Best Songs of the 1980s (#59)	Pitchfork
2018	Music for the Masses	The 200 Best Albums of the 1980s (#77)	Pitchfork
2022	"Enjoy the Silence"	The 250 Best Songs of the 1990s (#106)	Pitchfork
2022	Violator	The 150 Best Albums of the 1990s (#136)	Pitchfork
