= Remixes 81–04 =

2004 remix album by Depeche Mode

Remix album by Depeche Mode
- Released: 25 October 2004
- Recorded: 1981–2004
- Length: 243:30
- Label: Mute
- Producer: Various
- Compiler: Roland Brown

Depeche Mode chronology
Exciter (2001)	Remixes 81–04 (2004)	Playing the Angel (2005)

Singles from Remixes 81-04
- 1. "Enjoy the Silence 04" Released: 18 October 2004

Professional ratings
Review scores
Source	Rating
AllMusic	3.5/5 stars
The Encyclopedia of Popular Music	3/5 stars
Pitchfork	5.9/10

Remixes 81–04 is a remix album by the English electronic music band Depeche Mode, released on 25 October 2004. It was the band's first release since Daniel Miller's independent label Mute Records was acquired by industry major EMI in 2002. It features well-known remixes from the band's back catalogue, as well as previously unavailable mixes.

There are three versions of Remixes 81–04. The main version has two CDs. The limited-edition version has the same two CDs, plus a bonus CD with mostly new remixes. There is also a one-CD release with selections from all three discs.

The booklet, found in all three versions, features an essay by Paul Morley. A special "secret website" (now offline) could be unlocked with the CDs.

During the promotion of the limited three-CD edition of Remixes 81–04, the above-mentioned site was launched for fans who bought the bundle, which featured exclusive goodies. There was a special digital download-only bundle titled Remixes 81···04 Rare Tracks, which is now offline for all songs. It was accompanied with official artwork (also download-only). Users who bought the entire bundle could burn the tracks to a 90-minute CD-R (the whole album lasts 88:32) and print the artwork.

It was followed by a second remix album, Remixes 2: 81–11, released on 3 June 2011.

== Track listing ==
All songs written by Martin L. Gore, except "Shout!", "Just Can't Get Enough" and "Photographic" by Vince Clarke, and "Route 66" by Bobby Troup.

=== Remixes 81·04 ===
- LCDMUTEL8 – one-disc edition
1. "Never Let Me Down Again" (Split Mix) – 9:32
2. "Personal Jesus" (Pump Mix) – 7:47
3. "Barrel of a Gun" (Underworld Hard Mix) – 9:36
4. "Route 66" (Beatmasters Mix) – 6:18
5. "Useless" (The Kruder + Dorfmeister Session™) – 9:06
6. "In Your Room" (The Jeep Rock Mix) – 6:19
7. "Home" (Air 'Around the Golf' Remix) – 3:55
8. "Strangelove" (Blind Mix) – 6:32
9. "I Feel You" (Renegade Soundwave Afghan Surgery Mix) – 4:57
10. "Just Can't Get Enough" (Schizo Mix) – 6:45
11. "Halo" (Goldfrapp Remix) – 4:22
12. "Enjoy the Silence" (Reinterpreted) – 3:32

=== Remixes 81··04 ===
- CDMUTEL8 – two-disc edition

Disc one

1. "Never Let Me Down Again" (Split Mix) – 9:31 (Depeche Mode & Dave Bascombe, 1987)
2. "Policy of Truth" (Capitol Mix) – 8:00 (François Kevorkian, 1990)
3. "Shout!" (Rio Remix) – 7:29 (Depeche Mode & Daniel Miller, 1981)
4. "Home" (Air 'Around the Golf' Remix) – 3:55 (Air, 1997)
5. "Strangelove" (Blind Mix) – 6:32 (Daniel Miller & Rico Conning, 1987)
6. "Rush" (Spiritual Guidance Mix) – 5:27 (Jack Dangers, 1993)
7. "I Feel You" (Renegade Soundwave Afghan Surgery Mix) – 4:57 (Renegade Soundwave, 1993)
8. "Barrel of a Gun" (Underworld Hard Mix) – 9:36 (Underworld, 1997)
9. "Route 66" (Beatmasters Mix) – 6:18 (Beatmasters, 1987)
10. "Freelove" (DJ Muggs Remix) – 4:24 (DJ Muggs, 2001)
11. "I Feel Loved" (Chamber's Remix) – 6:17 (Chamber, 2001)
12. "Just Can't Get Enough" (Schizo Mix) – 6:45 (Depeche Mode & Daniel Miller, 1981)

Disc two

1. "Personal Jesus" (Pump Mix) – 7:47 (François Kevorkian, 1989)
2. "World in My Eyes" (Mode to Joy) – 6:28 (Jon Marsh, 1990)
3. "Get the Balance Right!" (Combination Mix) – 7:56 (Depeche Mode & Daniel Miller, 1983)
4. "Everything Counts" (Absolut Mix) – 6:02 (Alan Moulder, 1989)
5. "Breathing in Fumes" – 6:05 (Depeche Mode, Daniel Miller & Gareth Jones, 1986)
6. "Painkiller" (Kill the Pain DJ Shadow vs. Depeche Mode) – 6:29 (DJ Shadow, 1998)
7. "Useless" (The Kruder + Dorfmeister Session™) – 9:06 (Kruder & Dorfmeister, 1997)
8. "In Your Room" (The Jeep Rock Mix) – 6:19 (Jonny Dollar with Portishead, 1994)
9. "Dream On" (Dave Clarke Acoustic Version) – 4:23 (Dave Clarke, 2001)
10. "It's No Good" (Speedy J Mix) – 5:02 (Speedy J, 1997)
11. "Master and Servant" (An ON-USound Science Fiction Dance Hall Classic) – 4:35 (Adrian Sherwood, 1984)
12. "Enjoy the Silence" (Timo Maas Extended Mix) – 8:41 (Timo Maas, 2004)

=== Remixes 81···04 ===
- XLCDMUTEL8 – three-disc edition
- Discs one and two are the same as the two-disc edition

Disc three

1. "A Question of Lust" (Remix) – 5:08 (Flood, 1986)
2. "Walking in My Shoes" (Random Carpet Mix (Full Length)) – 8:37 (William Orbit, 1993)
3. "Are People People?" – 4:28 (Adrian Sherwood, 1984)
4. "World in My Eyes" (Daniel Miller Mix) – 4:37 (Daniel Miller, 1990)
5. "I Feel Loved" (Danny Tenaglia's Labor of Love Dub (Edit)) – 11:21 (Danny Tenaglia, 2001)
6. "It's No Good" (Club 69 Future Mix) – 8:50 (Club 69, 1997)
7. "Photographic" (Rex the Dog Dubb Mix) – 6:20 (Rex the Dog, 2004)
8. "Little 15" (Ulrich Schnauss Remix) – 4:52 (Ulrich Schnauss, 2004)
9. "Nothing" (Headcleanr Rock Mix) – 3:30 (Headcleanr, 2004)
10. "Lie to Me" ('The Pleasure of Her Private Shame' Remix by LFO) – 6:33 (LFO, 2004)
11. "Clean" (Colder Version) – 7:09 (Colder, 2004)
12. "Halo" (Goldfrapp Remix) – 4:22 (Goldfrapp, 2004)
13. "Enjoy the Silence" (Reinterpreted) – 3:32 (Mike Shinoda of Linkin Park, 2004)
- A promotional version of the 3-disc edition has the full 12:10 version of "I Feel Loved (Danny Tenaglia's Labor of Love Dub)" but omits "Lie to Me ('The Pleasure of Her Private Shame' Remix by LFO)".

=== Remixes 81····04 ===
- MUTEL8 – six-LP edition
- Has the same tracks as the three-disc edition (XLCDMUTEL8), in slightly different order, except it has the full 12:10 version of "I Feel Loved" (Danny Tenaglia's Labor of Love Dub)
- Limited edition of 12,000 machine-numbered copies worldwide

=== Remixes 81···04 Rare Tracks ===
- ZMUTEL8 – digital download
1. "Behind the Wheel/Route 66" (Megamix) – 7:51 (Ivan Ivan, 1987)
2. "Dream On" (Morel's Pink Noise Club Mix) – 7:45 (Richard Morel, 2001)
3. "Master and Servant" (U.S. Black and Blue Version) – 8:04 (Joseph Watt, 1984)
4. "Nothing" (Justin Strauss Mix) – 7:05 (Justin Strauss, 1989)
5. "People Are People" (Special Edition ON-USound Remix) – 7:33 (Adrian Sherwood, 1984)
6. "Little 15" (Bogus Brothers Mix) – 6:11 (Bogus Brothers, 2004)
7. "Freelove" (Josh Wink Dub) – 8:51 (Josh Wink, 2001)
8. "Personal Jesus" (Kazan Cathedral Mix) – 4:18 (François Kevorkian, 1989)
9. "But Not Tonight" (Extended Remix) – 5:15 (Robert Margouleff, 1986)
10. "But Not Tonight" (Margouleff Dance Mix) – 6:08 (Robert Margouleff, 1986)
11. "Freelove" (Powder Productions Remix) – 7:58 (Powder Productions, 2001)
12. "Slowblow" (Mad Professor Mix) – 5:25 (Mad Professor, 1997)
13. "Rush" (Black Sun Mix) – 6:02 (Coil, 1994)

=== Remixes 81–04 A Continuous Mix by Mount Sims ===
- PRO-CD-101442 – promotional only
1. "Megamix (A Continuous Mix)" – 10:19 (Mount Sims, 2004)

== Charts ==
=== Weekly charts ===
Weekly chart performance for Remixes 81–04
Chart (2004–2005)	Peak position
Austrian Albums (Ö3 Austria)	38
Belgian Albums (Ultratop Flanders)	22
Belgian Albums (Ultratop Wallonia)	9
Czech Albums (ČNS IFPI)	23
Danish Albums (Hitlisten)	10
Dutch Albums (Album Top 100)	68
European Albums (Billboard)	3
French Compilation Albums (SNEP)	4
German Albums (Offizielle Top 100)	2
Hungarian Albums (MAHASZ)	35
Irish Albums (IRMA)	39
Italian Albums (FIMI)	6
Japanese Albums (Oricon)	257
Norwegian Albums (VG-lista)	18
Polish Albums (ZPAV)	11
Portuguese Albums (AFP)	28
Scottish Albums (OCC)	31
Spanish Albums (PROMUSICAE)	56
Swedish Albums (Sverigetopplistan)	16
Swiss Albums (Schweizer Hitparade)	7
UK Albums (OCC)	24
UK Dance Albums (OCC)	3
US Top Dance Albums (Billboard)	1

=== Year-end charts ===
Year-end chart performance for Remixes 81–04
Chart (2004)	Position
Belgian Albums (Ultratop Wallonia)	51
German Albums (Offizielle Top 100)	69
Italian Albums (FIMI)	38

== Certifications and sales ==
Certifications and sales for Remixes 81–04
Region	Certification	Certified units/sales
France (SNEP)	2× Gold	200,000^{*}
Germany (BVMI)	Platinum	200,000^{^}
Hungary (MAHASZ)	Gold	10,000^{^}
Spain (PROMUSICAE)	Gold	50,000^{^}
United Kingdom (BPI)	Gold	100,000^{‡}
Summaries
Worldwide	—	1,000,000
^{*} Sales figures based on certification alone.^{^} Shipments figures based on certification alone.^{‡} Sales+streaming figures based on certification alone.
