= List of Billboard number-one dance singles of 2001 =

Billboard magazine compiled the top-performing dance singles in the United States during 2001 on two Hot Dance Music charts: the Club Play and the Maxi-Singles Sales. Premiered in 1976, the Club Play chart ranked the most-played singles on dance club based on reports from a national sample of club DJs. The Maxi-Singles Sales chart was launched in 1985 to compile the best-selling dance singles based on retail sales across the United States.

== Charts history ==
Chart history
Issue date	Hot Dance Music/Club Play		Hot Dance Music/Maxi-Singles Sales		Ref.
Issue date	Song	Artist(s)	Song	Artist(s)	Ref.
January 6	"One More Time"	Daft Punk	"Independent Women Part I"	Destiny's Child	
January 13	"The Underground"	Celeda	"Independent Women Part I"	Destiny's Child	
January 20	"Don't Tell Me"	Madonna	"Independent Women Part I"	Destiny's Child	
January 27	"Lady (Hear Me Tonight)"	Modjo	"Independent Women Part I"	Destiny's Child	
February 3	"Beautiful Day"	U2	"Don't Tell Me"	Madonna	
February 10	"Lovin' You"	Kristine W	"Don't Tell Me"	Madonna	
February 17	"Boy"	Book of Love	"Don't Tell Me"	Madonna	
February 24	"Papa's Got a Brand New Pigbag"	Thunderpuss	"Don't Tell Me"	Madonna	
March 3	"Stranger in My House"	Tamia	"Don't Tell Me"	Madonna	
March 10	"Who the Hell Are You"	Madison Avenue	"Butterfly"	Crazy Town	
March 17	"Needin' U II"	David Morales presents The Face featuring Juliet Roberts	"Love Don't Cost A Thing"	Jennifer Lopez	
March 24	"Just Keep Thinking About You"	Gloria Gaynor	"Love Don't Cost A Thing"	Jennifer Lopez	
March 31	"The Power"	Rosabel featuring Jeanie Tracy	"Love Don't Cost A Thing"	Jennifer Lopez	
April 7	"Mine to Give"	Photek featuring Robert Owens	"Love Don't Cost A Thing"	Jennifer Lopez	
April 14	"Is It Love?"	Chili Hi Fly	"Stranger In My House" (Remixes)	Tamia	
April 21	"Looking for Love"	Karen Ramirez	"Stranger In My House" (Remixes)	Tamia	
April 28	"Are You Satisfied"	Victor Calderone featuring Deborah Cooper	"Stranger In My House" (Remixes)	Tamia	
May 5	"Are You Satisfied"	Victor Calderone featuring Deborah Cooper	"Stranger In My House" (Remixes)	Tamia	
May 12	"All for You"	Janet	"Dream On"	Depeche Mode	
May 19	"All for You"	Janet	"What It Feels Like for a Girl"	Madonna	
May 26	"All for You"	Janet	"Survivor" (Remixes)	Destiny's Child	
June 2	"What It Feels Like for a Girl"	Madonna	"Survivor" (Remixes)	Destiny's Child	
June 9	"Dream On"	Depeche Mode	"Survivor" (Remixes)	Destiny's Child	
June 16	"Get It Up (The Feeling)"	Ultra Naté	"Survivor" (Remixes)	Destiny's Child	
June 23	"Get It Up (The Feeling)"	Ultra Naté	"Survivor" (Remixes)	Destiny's Child	
June 30	"You're the Worst Thing for Me"	Pusaka featuring Thea Austin	"Survivor" (Remixes)	Destiny's Child	
July 7	"Bumpin' and Jumpin'"	Kim English	"Survivor" (Remixes)	Destiny's Child	
July 14	"Keep Control"	Sono	"Survivor" (Remixes)	Destiny's Child	
July 21	"Keep Control"	Sono	"All Or Nothing" (Remixes)	O-Town	
July 28	"Keep Control"	Sono	"All Or Nothing" (Remixes)	O-Town	
August 4	"Keep Control"	Sono	"All Or Nothing" (Remixes)	O-Town	
August 11	"Planets of the Universe"	Stevie Nicks	"All Or Nothing" (Remixes)	O-Town	
August 18	"Someone to Call My Lover"	Janet	"All Or Nothing" (Remixes)	O-Town	
August 25	"You Set Me Free"	Abigail	"All Or Nothing" (Remixes)	O-Town	
September 1	"Thank You"	Dido	"All Or Nothing" (Remixes)	O-Town	
September 8	"I Feel Loved"	Depeche Mode	"All Or Nothing" (Remixes)	O-Town	
September 15	"I Feel Loved"	Depeche Mode	"Where the Party At" (Remixes)	Jagged Edge With Nelly	
September 22	"Absolutely Not"	Deborah Cox	"Where the Party At" (Remixes)	Jagged Edge With Nelly	
September 29	"Absolutely Not"	Deborah Cox	"Where the Party At" (Remixes)	Jagged Edge With Nelly	
October 6	"Stand Still"	Aubrey	"Where the Party At" (Remixes)	Jagged Edge With Nelly	
October 13	"Feel This 2001"	Robbie Rivera	"Where the Party At" (Remixes)	Jagged Edge With Nelly	
October 20	"Crystal"	New Order	"Where the Party At" (Remixes)	Jagged Edge With Nelly	
October 27	"Yes!"	Amber	"Where the Party At" (Remixes)	Jagged Edge With Nelly	
November 3	"It Began in Afrika"	The Chemical Brothers	"Where the Party At" (Remixes)	Jagged Edge With Nelly	
November 10	"Break 4 Love"	Peter Rauhofer + Pet Shop Boys = The Collaboration	"Lifetime" (Ben Watt Remix)	Maxwell	
November 17	"Impressive Instant"	Madonna	"Lifetime" (Ben Watt Remix)	Maxwell	
November 24	"Impressive Instant"	Madonna	"Lifetime" (Ben Watt Remix)	Maxwell	
December 1	"So Strong"	Ben Shaw featuring Adele Holness	"Lifetime" (Ben Watt Remix)	Maxwell	
December 8	"Lettin' Ya Mind Go"	Desert	"Lifetime" (Ben Watt Remix)	Maxwell	
December 15	"Hero"	Enrique Iglesias	"Lifetime" (Ben Watt Remix)	Maxwell	
December 22	"Turn Off the Light"	Nelly Furtado	"Trust Your Love"	Koda	
December 29	"Come on Down"	Crystal Waters	"Freelove"	Depeche Mode	

== See also ==
- 2001 in music
- List of Billboard Hot 100 number ones of 2001
