= One Night in Paris =

Video by Depeche Mode
- Released: 27 May 2002
- Recorded: 9–10 October 2001
- Venue: Palais Omnisports de Paris-Bercy (Paris, France)
- Genre: Synth-pop; new wave; alternative rock; electronic rock
- Length: 1:57:38
- Label: Mute Records
- Director: Anton Corbijn
- Producer: Richard Bell

Depeche Mode chronology
The Videos 86>98 (1998)	One Night in Paris (2002)	Touring the Angel: Live in Milan (2005)

One Night in Paris – The Exciter Tour 2001 – A Live DVD by Anton Corbijn is a video release by Depeche Mode, featuring an entire concert from their 2001 Exciter Tour, shot at the Palais Omnisports de Paris-Bercy on 9 and 10 October 2001. Although the cover only lists the second date, material from the first was used, as "It Doesn't Matter Two" was only played on the 9th. That song was replaced by "Sister of Night" the next day (and included as a bonus track on disc two). It was directed and filmed by Anton Corbijn, and released on 27 May 2002.

The first disc features the full concert, while the second disc contains documentaries on the movie, interviews with the band, extra songs, tour projections, and more.

== Background ==
The DVD was directed by the band's long-time artistic collaborator Anton Corbijn at the sold-out Palais Omnisports de Paris-Bercy in front of 16,000 people. The concert film was shot on anamorphic 16:9 Digital Betacam using 13 cameras.

== Track listing ==
=== DVD ===
One Night in Paris – The Exciter Tour 2001 – A Live DVD by Anton Corbijn – Disc one
No.	Title	Original release	Length
1.	"Easy Tiger (Intro) / Dream On" (Guitar Intro)	Exciter, 2001	2:46
2.	"The Dead of Night"	Exciter, 2001	5:02
3.	"The Sweetest Condition"	Exciter, 2001	3:39
4.	"Halo"	Violator, 1990	4:49
5.	"Walking in My Shoes"	Songs of Faith and Devotion, 1993	6:25
6.	"Dream On"	Exciter, 2001	5:40
7.	"When the Body Speaks"	Exciter, 2001	6:58
8.	"Waiting for the Night"	Violator, 1990	6:07
9.	"It Doesn't Matter Two" (Acoustic)	Black Celebration, 1986	3:46
10.	"Breathe"	Exciter, 2001	5:51
11.	"Freelove"	Exciter, 2001	6:40
12.	"Enjoy the Silence"	Violator, 1990	7:29
13.	"I Feel You"	Songs of Faith and Devotion, 1993	6:48
14.	"In Your Room" (Zephyr Mix)	Songs of Faith and Devotion, 1993	5:32
15.	"It's No Good"	Ultra, 1997	4:37
16.	"Personal Jesus"	Violator, 1990	7:46
17.	"Home"	Ultra, 1997	6:09
18.	"Condemnation"	Songs of Faith and Devotion, 1993	4:23
19.	"Black Celebration"	Black Celebration, 1986	4:50
20.	"Never Let Me Down Again"	Music for the Masses, 1987	11:12
Total length:			1:57:38

Bonus tracks
No.	Title	Original release	Length
1.	"Sister of Night" (Acoustic)	Ultra, 1997	5:25
2.	"Surrender" (Acoustic, Dressing Room)	First B-side of the single "Only When I Lose Myself" (1998)	4:46

One Night in Paris – The Exciter Tour 2001 – A Live DVD by Anton Corbijn – Disc two
No.	Title	Length
1.	"The Preparing"	8:20
2.	"The Photographing" (Photos and stories by Anton Corbijn)	52:00
3.	"The Waiting"	7:15
4.	"The Talking"	10:24
5.	"The Screening"	23:30
6.	"The Choosing" (Take control of 3 different camera angles)	7:30
7.	"The Subtitling" (Includes subtitles in German, French, English, Italian, Spanish and Japanese)	6:07

=== UMD ===
One Night in Paris – A Live Film by Anton Corbijn
No.	Title	Length
1.	"Easy Tiger/Dream On" (Guitar Intro)	2:46
2.	"The Dead of Night"	5:02
3.	"The Sweetest Condition"	3:39
4.	"Halo"	4:49
5.	"Walking in My Shoes"	6:25
6.	"Dream On"	5:40
7.	"When the Body Speaks"	6:58
8.	"Waiting for the Night"	6:07
9.	"It Doesn't Matter Two" (Acoustic)	3:46
10.	"Breathe"	5:51
11.	"Freelove"	6:40
12.	"Enjoy the Silence"	7:29
13.	"I Feel You"	6:48
14.	"In Your Room" (Zephyr Mix)	5:32
15.	"It's No Good"	4:37
16.	"Personal Jesus"	7:46
17.	"Home"	6:09
18.	"Condemnation"	4:23
19.	"Black Celebration"	4:50
20.	"Never Let Me Down Again"	11:16
Total length:		1:57:38

=== VHS ===
One Night in Paris – A Live Concert Film by Anton Corbijn
No.	Title	Length
1.	"Easy Tiger/Dream On" (Guitar Intro)	2:46
2.	"The Dead of Night"	5:02
3.	"The Sweetest Condition"	3:39
4.	"Halo"	4:49
5.	"Walking in My Shoes"	6:25
6.	"Dream On"	5:40
7.	"When the Body Speaks"	6:58
8.	"Waiting for the Night"	6:07
9.	"It Doesn't Matter Two" (Acoustic)	3:46
10.	"Breathe"	5:51
11.	"Freelove"	6:40
12.	"Enjoy the Silence"	7:29
13.	"I Feel You"	6:48
14.	"In Your Room" (Zephyr Mix)	5:32
15.	"It's No Good"	4:37
16.	"Personal Jesus"	7:46
17.	"Home"	6:09
18.	"Condemnation"	4:23
19.	"Black Celebration"	4:50
20.	"Never Let Me Down Again"	11:16
Total length:		1:57:38

== Formats ==
- DVD – double-disc DVD release, DVD 1 containing 20 tracks from the Exciter Tour concert recorded between 9–10 October 2001, and DVD 2 containing bonus material.
- UMD – European and U.S. 1-disc UMD release, entitled One Night in Paris – A Live Film by Anton Corbijn, containing 20 tracks from the Exciter Tour concert recorded between 9–10 October 2001.
- VHS – Europe-only VHS release, entitled One Night in Paris – A Live Concert by Anton Corbijn, containing 20 tracks from the Exciter Tour concert recorded between 9–10 October 2001.

== Cast ==
=== Depeche Mode ===
- Dave Gahan – vocals
- Martin Gore – guitar, keyboards, vocals
- Andy Fletcher – keyboards, backing vocals

=== Backup musicians ===
- Christian Eigner – drums
- Peter Gordeno – keyboards, backing vocals
- Jordan Bailey – backing vocals
- Georgia Lewis – backing vocals

== Charts ==
Chart	Peak position
German Albums Chart	54
U.S. Billboard Top Music Video Sales	13

== Certifications ==
Region	Certification	Certified units/sales
Argentina (CAPIF)	Platinum	8,000^{^}
France (SNEP)	3× Platinum	60,000^{*}
Germany (BVMI)	Platinum	50,000^{^}
Mexico (AMPROFON)	Gold	10,000^{^}
Poland (ZPAV)	Platinum	10,000^{*}
Spain (PROMUSICAE)	Gold	10,000^{^}
United States (RIAA)	Gold	50,000^{^}
^{*} Sales figures based on certification alone.^{^} Shipments figures based on certification alone.
