= John Hillcoat =

Australian-Canadian film director (born 1961)

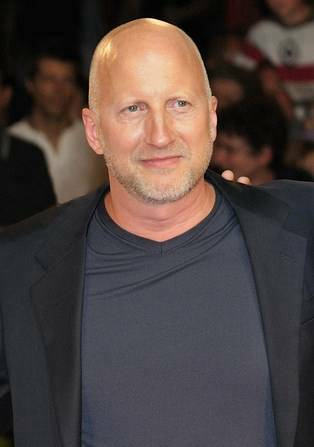
- Hillcoat at the 2009 Venice Film Festival
- Born: 14 August 1961 (age 65); Brisbane, Queensland, Australia
- Occupations: Film director, screenwriter, music video director

John Hillcoat (born 14 August 1961) is an Australian film director, screenwriter, and music video director.

His early work includes the 1988 prison film Ghosts... of the Civil Dead, as well as music videos for bands such as Siouxsie and the Banshees, Depeche Mode and Nick Cave and the Bad Seeds. His breakthrough film, the 2005 outback Western The Proposition, was written by Nick Cave and received widespread critical acclaim. Hillcoat went on to direct The Road (2009), an adaptation of Cormac McCarthy's 2006 novel of the same name, and Lawless (2012), a Prohibition-era crime drama. His films often explore themes of survival, violence, and morality, showcasing a raw, atmospheric aesthetic.

== Early life ==
Hillcoat was born in Brisbane, Queensland, Australia on 14 August 1961, to feminist artist Pat Hillcoat and oncologist Dr. Brian Leslie Hillcoat, growing up in North America and Europe. He attended Sir John A. Macdonald Secondary School in Hamilton, Ontario, Canada, and was enrolled in its Special Art Program. As a child, his paintings were featured in the Art Gallery of Hamilton. He was active with the McMaster University Film Board, most notably producing an animated short titled The Finger.

Back in Australia by the late 1970s, aged 18, Hillcoat studied film at the Swinburne University of Technology, in Melbourne. He became immersed in the city's post-punk scene, through which he met his now wife, the photographer Polly Borland, and began a lifelong creative collaboration with Nick Cave, editing the music video for his band The Birthday Party's single "Nick the Stripper" (1981). Hillcoat also got a job filming concerts at the famed Melbourne post-punk venue the Crystal Ballroom.

== Career ==
Hillcoat has often worked with Nick Cave, the band Depeche Mode, and actor Guy Pearce. The Road, his adaptation of the novel by Cormac McCarthy, premiered at the 2009 Toronto Film Festival, and was released in the U.S. in November 2009. His 2012 film, Lawless, competed for the Palme d'Or at the 2012 Cannes Film Festival. Hillcoat's film, Triple 9 was released in 2016. In 2017, he directed "Crocodile", an episode of the anthology series Black Mirror. In 2024, it was announced that Hillcoat would be directing a film adaptation of another McCarthy novel, Blood Meridian.

== Filmography ==
=== Film ===
Year	Title	Director	Producer
1988	Ghosts... of the Civil Dead	Yes	No
1996	To Have & to Hold	Yes	No
2005	The Proposition	Yes	No
2009	The Road	Yes	No
2012	Lawless	Yes	No
2016	Triple 9	Yes	Yes

Documentary film

Year	Title	Notes
2001	Digital Hardcore Videos	
2021	Bob Dylan: Odds and Ends	Co-directed with Jennifer Lebeau

Short film

Year	Title	Notes
2010	Red Dead Redemption: The Man from Blackwater	Short machinima film to promote the video game Red Dead Redemption
2018	Corazón	

=== Television ===
Year	Title	Notes
2017	Black Mirror	Episode "Crocodile"
2022	George & Tammy	Miniseries
2023	Special Ops: Lioness	4 episodes

=== Music video ===
Year	Artist	Title
1989	Elvis Costello	"Veronica"
1991	Crowded House	"Chocolate Cake"
1993	Herbert Grönemeyer	"Chaos"
1993	Herbert Grönemeyer	"Land unter"
1994	Frente!	"Bizarre Love Triangle"
1994	Siouxsie and the Banshees	"O Baby"
1994	Siouxsie and the Banshees	"Stargazer"
1996	Manic Street Preachers	"Australia"
1997	Bush	"Personal Holloway"
1997	Mansun	"She Makes My Nose Bleed"
1998	Placebo	"You Don't Care About Us"
1998	Embrace	"All You Good Good People"
1998	Therapy?	"Church of Noise"
1998	Neil Finn	"Sinner"
1998	Therapy?	"Lonely, Cryin', Only"
1999	Suede	"Can't Get Enough"
1999	James	"Just Like Fred Astaire"
1999	HIM	"Join Me in Death"
2000	Chicane	"No Ordinary Morning"
2000	Einstürzende Neubauten	"Sabrina"
2001	HIM	"In Joy and Sorrow"
2001	Depeche Mode	"I Feel Loved"
2001	Depeche Mode	"Freelove"
2002	Depeche Mode	"Goodnight Lovers"
2002	Gemma Hayes	"Hanging Around"
2002	Manic Street Preachers	"There by the Grace of God"
2003	Nick Cave and the Bad Seeds	"Babe, I'm on Fire"
2003	AFI	"Silver and Cold"
2003	Muse	"Time Is Running Out"
2007	Maroon 5	"Makes Me Wonder"
2007	Grinderman	"No Pussy Blues"
2010	Grinderman	"Heathen Child"
2010	Unkle	"The Answer"
2012	Io Echo	"Berlin, It's All A Mess"
2012	How to Destroy Angels	"Ice Age"
2013	Nick Cave and the Bad Seeds	"Jubilee Street"
2013	Bob Dylan	"Visions of Johanna"
2014	Johnny Cash	"She Used to Love Me a Lot"
2016	Massive Attack	"The Spoils"
2021	Run the Jewels	"Never Look Back"

== Awards and nominations ==
Year	Award	Category	Title	Result
1989	Australian Film Institute	Best Original Screenplay	Ghosts... of the Civil Dead	Nominated
1992	ARIA Music Awards	ARIA Award for Best Video	"Chocolate Cake" by Crowded House	Won
1996	ARIA Music Awards	ARIA Award for Best Video	"Sit on My Hands" by Frente! (with Polly Borland)	Nominated
1996	Verona Love Screens Film Festival	Best Film	To Have & to Hold	Nominated
2005	Australian Film Institute	Best Director	The Proposition	Nominated
2005	Film Critics Circle of Australia	Best Director	The Proposition	Nominated
2005	Inside Film Awards	Best Feature Film	The Proposition	Won
2005	Inside Film Awards	Best Director	The Proposition	Nominated
2009	Venice Film Festival	Golden Lion	The Road	Nominated
2012	Cannes Film Festival	Palme d'or	Lawless	Nominated
2013	ARIA Music Awards	ARIA Award for Best Video	"Jubilee Street" by Nick Cave and the Bad Seeds	Nominated
