= Aubrey Ayala =

American singer-songwriter

Aubrey Ann Ayala, simply known as Aubrey, is a vocal artist from Philadelphia. She has two entries on the U.S. Hot Dance Club Play chart. In 2001 she hit number one with "Stand Still". Her second hit came in 2003, when "Willing & Able" climbed to number 24.

| Preceded by "Absolutely Not" by Deborah Cox | Single: "Stand Still"; Billboard Hot Dance Club Play number-one single October 6, 2001 | Succeeded by "Feel This 2001" by Robbie Rivera |
