= Exciter (Depeche Mode album) =

2001 studio album by Depeche Mode

Studio album by Depeche Mode
- Released: 14 May 2001
- Studios: RAK and Sarm West (London); Sound Design (Santa Barbara); Electric Lady and Sony (New York City)
- Genres: Synth-pop; electronica
- Length: 56:40
- Label: Mute
- Producer: Mark Bell

Depeche Mode chronology
The Singles 86>98 (1998)	Exciter (2001)	Remixes 81–04 (2004)

Singles from Exciter
- 1. "Dream On" Released: 17 April 2001; 2. "I Feel Loved" Released: 30 July 2001; 3. "Freelove" Released: 5 November 2001; 4. "Goodnight Lovers" Released: 11 February 2002

Exciter is the tenth studio album by the English electronic music band Depeche Mode. It was first released on 14 May 2001 in the United Kingdom by Mute Records and a day later in the United States by Reprise Records. The album was produced by Mark Bell, and was supported by the Exciter Tour, one of the band's most successful tours.

Exciter debuted at number nine on the UK Albums Chart and number eight on the Billboard 200, selling 115,000 copies in its first week in the United States. It was the only Depeche Mode album to debut higher in the United States than in the United Kingdom. As of April 2006, Exciter had sold over 426,000 copies in the US, and has been certified gold by the Recording Industry Association of America (RIAA); it has also been certified gold in Canada for shipments of 50,000 units.

The plant that appears on the cover is the Agave attenuata, a species of agave sometimes known as the "lion's tail", "swan's neck", or "foxtail" for its development of a curved stem, unusual among agaves.

== Background and composition ==
Lyrically, the album covers many different subjects. Martin Gore said that "The Dead of Night" was inspired by a club in London where there were a lot of drugs and mayhem. Gore told MTV Europe that "I Feel Loved" is about when you "feel absolutely like shit, and you feel the worst you've ever felt in your life. Then somehow you think: 'the universe must like me, for making me feel like this'".

Musically, Exciter can be described as a very atmospheric and electronic album. Gore had stated that he had been listening to more abstract electronic music in the lead up to recording Exciter, which could have influenced some of the more experimental soundscapes on the album. The group also often cited producer Mark Bell as a major inspiration in the making of Exciter as Gahan states that Mark Bell helped make him a more confident vocalist. The band also worked with Paul Freegard and long-time collaborator Gareth Jones, who were involved with pre-production and programming.

On top of the electronic soundscapes, Depeche Mode also added elements of traditional blues, retro funk, progressive rock, and orchestral pop to its arrangements. Bell told Keyboard magazine that they treated the acoustic and electronic sounds on the track "Dream On" the same. Gore felt that many songs of the album including "When the Body Speaks" have a 1950s or 1960s sound to them. "Comatose" was massively stripped down from the original demo since the band wanted a more minimalistic arrangement. "Freelove" was one of the final tracks to be completed on the album. "The Dead of Night" features a harsher sound compared to other tracks on the album, making heavy use of analogue synths such as the EMS Synthi AKS; the practice of largely using analogue synths would become common on later albums by the band.

Bell found working with the group fun but strange, stating he had listened to the group when he was 12 and found the band asking him for days off or "what they should eat". According to an interview with Gahan in 2003, Gore's lack of involvement with the production led to Bell feeling frustrated and that he was essentially creating the album for the band.

== Tour ==
The tour began with a North American leg on 4 June 2001; the group performed one rehearsal show and two "warm-up" concerts before the official tour began in Montreal, Quebec, Canada, in mid-June 2001. The leg continued until mid-August, concluding with two shows in Anaheim, California.

In late August 2001, the group began a European leg, which started in Tallinn and culminated in early November in Mannheim, Germany. This was the final show of the tour; a second European leg had been planned for the summer of 2002 but this never happened. In total, the band played 84 concerts, performing to over 1.5 million people in 24 countries.

The concerts in Paris were filmed and issued in May 2002 on a DVD release entitled One Night in Paris.

== Reception ==
Professional ratings
Aggregate scores
Source	Rating
Metacritic	65/100
Review scores
Source	Rating
AllMusic	2.5/5 stars
Alternative Press	4/5
Entertainment Weekly	B−
The Guardian	4/5 stars
NME	8/10
Pitchfork	5.5/10
Q	2/5 stars
Rolling Stone	3.5/5 stars
Spin	5/10
USA Today	3.5/4 stars

Exciter received generally positive reviews. While many critics praised the album's experimental and digital soundscapes, some felt it was one of the weakest Depeche Mode albums.

In a positive review, NME wrote that "Not many long-running groups could make an album this fresh and confident in their 20th year, never mind one which bridges timeless soulman crooning and underground techno". Rolling Stone complimented the album's minimal arrangements, comparing them to early Kraftwerk. The A.V. Club complimented Mark Bell's production on the album, stating that "Bell's subtle, inventive knob-twiddling pairs perfectly with Martin Gore's new batch of somber, subdued songs".

In contrast, Q Magazine was much more negative in their interpretation of the project, writing: "This time it's Martin Gore who's out of puff. No amount of fashionable tweaking can hide the flimsiness of his offerings".

Despite some mixed reviews, Exciter still appeared on several EOY 2001 lists such as Magic, MusikExpress, Rocksound, Rumba, Visions, and Woxy.

=== Accolades ===
Publication	Accolade	Year	Rank
Magic	Top Albums of 2001	2001	10
Musikexpress	Top Albums of 2001	2001	32
Rocksound	Top 50 Albums of 2001	2001	47
Rumba	Top Albums of 2001	2001	19
Visions	Top Albums of 2001	2001	15
Woxy	Top Albums of 2001	2001	34

== Re-release ==
On 2 October 2007 (3 October in North America), Exciter was re-released as a two-disc set, along with Ultra, in the fourth and final set of Depeche Mode reissues. The first disc was a remastered version of the original, on an SACD/CD hybrid (only a CD in the US). The second disc is a DVD which features the album in DTS 5.1, Dolby Digital 5.1 and PCM Stereo. The B-sides from Exciter as well as the single version of "Freelove" are included. There are also audio versions of all the live Exciter tracks played during the One Night in Paris film.

Like the other reissues, there is a documentary on the making of Exciter titled Depeche Mode 1999–2001 (Presenting the Intimate and Delicate Side of Depeche Mode). The documentary begins with the talks of Gore's writer's block and what they did about it. It also discusses the first three singles, the recording, the cover art and the Exciter tour (including one of the opening acts, Fad Gadget). The documentary is around 30 minutes long. The three members of the band are interviewed along with Daniel Miller, Christian Eigner, Peter Gordeno, Anton Corbijn, and Mute label representatives. The documentary ends with a "To Be Continued..."

Producer Mark Bell does not appear, and although they discuss the fact that the band decided not to have Corbijn direct Exciter's music videos, they do not interview the two who did direct them. However, John Hillcoat, who directed "I Feel Loved", "Freelove" and "Goodnight Lovers", is mentioned in passing.

== Track listing ==
All lead vocals by Dave Gahan, except where noted

All tracks are written by Martin L. Gore.

No.	Title	Lead vocals	Length
1.	"Dream On"		4:19
2.	"Shine"		5:32
3.	"The Sweetest Condition"		3:42
4.	"When the Body Speaks"		6:01
5.	"The Dead of Night"		4:50
6.	"Lovetheme"		2:02
7.	"Freelove"		6:10
8.	"Comatose"	Gore	3:24
9.	"I Feel Loved"		4:20
10.	"Breathe"	Gore	5:17
11.	"Easy Tiger"		2:05
12.	"I Am You"		5:10
13.	"Goodnight Lovers"		3:48
Total length:			56:40

=== 2007 Collectors Edition CD + DVD ===
- Disc one is a hybrid SACD/CD with a multi-channel SACD layer.
- Disc two is a DVD which includes Exciter in DTS 5.1, Dolby Digital 5.1 and PCM Stereo plus bonus material

Disc one (CD)
No.	Title	Length
1.	"Dream On"	4:19
2.	"Shine"	5:32
3.	"The Sweetest Condition"	3:42
4.	"When the Body Speaks"	6:01
5.	"The Dead of Night"	4:50
6.	"Lovetheme"	2:02
7.	"Freelove"	6:10
8.	"Comatose"	3:24
9.	"I Feel Loved"	4:20
10.	"Breathe"	5:17
11.	"Easy Tiger"	2:05
12.	"I Am You"	5:10
13.	"Goodnight Lovers"	3:48

Disc two (DVD): DTS 5.1, Dolby Digital 5.1 and PCM Stereo
No.	Title	Length
1.	"Depeche Mode: 1999–2001 (Presenting the Intimate and Delicate Side of Depeche Mode)" (a short film)	32:23
2.	"Dream On"	4:19
3.	"Shine"	5:32
4.	"The Sweetest Condition"	3:42
5.	"When the Body Speaks"	6:01
6.	"The Dead of Night"	4:50
7.	"Lovetheme"	2:02
8.	"Freelove"	6:10
9.	"Comatose"	3:24
10.	"I Feel Loved"	4:20
11.	"Breathe"	5:17
12.	"Easy Tiger"	2:05
13.	"I Am You"	5:10
14.	"Goodnight Lovers"	3:48

Disc two (DVD) additional tracks live in Paris, October 2001: DTS 5.1, Dolby Digital 5.1 and PCM Stereo
No.	Title	Length
15.	"The Dead of Night"
16.	"The Sweetest Condition"
17.	"Dream On"
18.	"When the Body Speaks"
19.	"Breathe"
20.	"Freelove"

Disc two (DVD) additional tracks: PCM Stereo
No.	Title	Length
16.	"Easy Tiger" (full version)
17.	"Dirt" (cover of a song written and performed by the Stooges)
18.	""Freelove"" (Flood mix [not listed on the back cover])
19.	"Zenstation"
20.	"When the Body Speaks" (Acoustic)

== Personnel ==
Credits adapted from the liner notes of Exciter.

=== Depeche Mode ===
- Dave Gahan
- Martin Gore
- Andrew Fletcher

=== Additional musicians ===
- Knox Chandler – solo cello, string arrangement (track 4)
- Todd C. Reynolds – strings (track 4)
- Joyce Hammann – strings (track 4)
- Natalie Cenovia Cummins – strings (track 4)
- Ralph H. Farris – strings (track 4)
- Leo Grinhauz – strings (track 4)
- Airto Moreira – percussion (tracks 7, 9)
- Christian Eigner – drums (track 12)

=== Technical ===
- Mark Bell – production
- Gareth Jones – engineering, pre-production, additional production
- Paul Freegard – pre-production, additional production
- Steve Fitzmaurice – mixing
- Boris Aldridge – engineering assistance
- Andrew Davies – engineering assistance
- Andrew Griffiths – engineering assistance
- Nick Sevilla – engineering assistance
- Lisa Butterworth – engineering assistance
- Jonathan Adler – engineering assistance
- Alissa Myhowich – engineering assistance
- James Chang – engineering assistance
- Mike Marsh – mastering at The Exchange (London)

=== Artwork ===
- Anton Corbijn – photography, cover art, art direction
- Form – design

== Charts ==
=== Weekly charts ===
Weekly chart performance for Exciter
Chart (2001)	Peak position
Australian Albums (ARIA)	20
Austrian Albums (Ö3 Austria)	2
Belgian Albums (Ultratop Flanders)	5
Belgian Albums (Ultratop Wallonia)	1
Canadian Albums (Billboard)	3
Czech Albums (ČNS IFPI)	1
Danish Albums (Hitlisten)	3
Dutch Albums (Album Top 100)	15
European Albums (Music & Media)	2
Finnish Albums (Suomen virallinen lista)	2
French Albums (SNEP)	1
German Albums (Offizielle Top 100)	1
Greek Albums (IFPI)	1
Hungarian Albums (MAHASZ)	1
Irish Albums (IRMA)	13
Italian Albums (FIMI)	2
Japanese Albums (Oricon)	79
Norwegian Albums (VG-lista)	3
Polish Albums (ZPAV)	1
Scottish Albums (Official Charts)	10
Spanish Albums (AFYVE)	2
Swedish Albums (Sverigetopplistan)	1
Swiss Albums (Schweizer Hitparade)	2
UK Albums (Official Charts)	9
UK Independent Albums (Official Charts)	1
US Billboard 200	8

=== Year-end charts ===
Year-end chart performance for Exciter
Chart (2001)	Position
Austrian Albums (Ö3 Austria)	53
Belgian Alternative Albums (Ultratop Flanders)	49
Belgian Albums (Ultratop Wallonia)	39
Canadian Albums (Nielsen SoundScan)	153
Danish Albums (Hitlisten)	57
European Albums (Music & Media)	30
Finnish Albums (Suomen virallinen lista)	58
French Albums (SNEP)	59
German Albums (Offizielle Top 100)	13
Italian Albums (FIMI)	28
Swedish Albums (Sverigetopplistan)	47
Swedish Albums & Compilations (Sverigetopplistan)	64
Swiss Albums (Schweizer Hitparade)	39

== Certifications and sales ==
Certifications and sales for Exciter
Region	Certification	Certified units/sales
Austria (IFPI Austria)	Gold	20,000^{*}
Belgium (BRMA)	Gold	25,000^{*}
Canada (Music Canada)	Gold	50,000^{^}
Finland (Musiikkituottajat)	Gold	15,450
France (SNEP)	Gold	100,000^{*}
Germany (BVMI)	Platinum	300,000^{^}
Italy	—	150,000
Poland (ZPAV)	Gold	35,000^{*}
Spain (Promusicae)	Gold	50,000^{^}
Sweden (GLF)	Gold	40,000^{^}
Switzerland (IFPI Switzerland)	Gold	20,000^{^}
United Kingdom (BPI)	Gold	100,000^{*}
United States (RIAA)	Gold	500,000^{^}
Summaries
Europe (IFPI)	Platinum	1,000,000^{*}
Worldwide	—	3,000,000
^{*} Sales figures based on certification alone.^{^} Shipments figures based on certification alone.

== See also ==
- List of number-one albums of 2001 (Poland)
- List of number-one hits of 2001 (France)
