= List of number-one albums of 2001 (Poland) =

These are the Polish number one albums of 2001, per the OLiS Chart.

== Chart history ==
Issue Date	Album	Artist(s)	Reference(s)
8 January	Golec uOrkiestra 2	Golec uOrkiestra	
15 January	Golec uOrkiestra 2	Golec uOrkiestra	
22 January	1	The Beatles	
29 January	1	The Beatles	
5 February	1	The Beatles	
12 February	J.Lo	Jennifer Lopez	
19 February	J.Lo	Jennifer Lopez	
26 February	Golec uOrkiestra 2	Golec uOrkiestra	
5 March	Płyta z muzyką	Voo Voo	
12 March	Yugoton	Yugoton	
19 March	Yugoton	Yugoton	
26 March	Yugoton	Yugoton	
2 April	W pustyni i w puszczy	Muzyka filmowa	
9 April	Yugoton	Yugoton	
16 April	No More Shall We Part	Nick Cave and the Bad Seeds	
23 April	Yugoton	Yugoton	
30 April	Yugoton	Yugoton	
7 May	Tobie	Natalia Kukulska	
14 May	Yugoton	Yugoton	
21 May	Melodie Kurta Weill'a i coś ponadto	Kazik Staszewski	
28 May	Exciter	Depeche Mode	
4 June	Exciter	Depeche Mode	
11 June	Lateralus	Tool	
18 June	Ad.4	Ich Troje	
25 June	Ad.4	Ich Troje	
2 July	Ad.4	Ich Troje	
9 July	Ad.4	Ich Troje	
16 July	Ad.4	Ich Troje	
23 July	Ad.4	Ich Troje	
20 August	Ad.4	Ich Troje	
27 August	Ad.4	Ich Troje	
3 September	Ad.4	Ich Troje	
10 September	Ad.4	Ich Troje	
17 September	Ad.4	Ich Troje	
24 September	Ad.4	Ich Troje	
1 October	Ad.4	Ich Troje	
8 October	Ad.4	Ich Troje	
15 October	Salon Recreativo	Kult	
22 October	Salon Recreativo	Kult	
29 October	Ten New Songs	Leonard Cohen	
5 November	Ten New Songs	Leonard Cohen	
12 November	Ten New Songs	Leonard Cohen	
19 November	Ten New Songs	Leonard Cohen	
26 November	Ten New Songs	Leonard Cohen	
3 December	Ten New Songs	Leonard Cohen	
10 December	Ten New Songs	Leonard Cohen	
17 December	Ten New Songs	Leonard Cohen	
24 December	Ten New Songs	Leonard Cohen	
