= Goodnight Lovers =

Single by Depeche Mode

from the album Exciter
- B-side: "When the Body Speaks" (acoustic version)
- Released: 11 February 2002
- Studio: RAK (London); Sarm West (London); Sound Design (Santa Barbara, California); Electric Lady (New York City); Sony (New York City)
- Genre: Synth-pop; soft rock
- Length: 3:48
- Label: Mute
- Songwriter: Martin L. Gore
- Producer: Mark Bell

Depeche Mode singles chronology
"Freelove" (2001)	"Goodnight Lovers" (2002)	"Enjoy the Silence 04" (2004)

Music video
- "Goodnight Lovers" on YouTube

"Goodnight Lovers" is a song by English electronic music band Depeche Mode, released on 11 February 2002 as the fourth and final single from the band's tenth studio album, Exciter (2001). The single was not released in the US.

The single did not qualify for the UK Singles Chart because it contained three songs in addition to the single itself, one more than UK singles rules allow. It did however qualify for the Budget Albums Chart and went straight to Number One before falling rapidly, the first Depeche Mode single to reach number one in an official UK chart.

The B-sides are remixes of "When the Body Speaks", "The Dead of Night", and "Goodnight Lovers".

== Background ==
Martin Gore said that he wanted to "recreate a Velvet Underground kind of feel. Velvet Underground with Nico, something like 'I'll Be Your Mirror'. It's very difficult to do that without Nico, but we got Dave to sing it really softly, almost whisper it, and I think the overall effect of the chords and the way he sung it does almost recreate it, which I was quite pleased with the end result."

Mark Bell suggested that Dave Gahan would sing the song. "For instance, he's got a seven-month-old baby daughter now, so I suggested he sing the album's closing track 'Goodnight Lovers' as though he was really singing it to her, like a lullaby. And I think that comes across. It's not role-playing, but something he could really feel."

== Music video ==
The video features the band situated in a dark room with screens showing still images of the band members and the backup singers, who also feature in the video. It also shows Gahan with longish hair.

== Track listing ==
=== 12": Mute / 12Bong33 (EU) ===
1. "Goodnight Lovers" – 3:48
2. "When the Body Speaks" (acoustic) – 6:00
3. "The Dead of Night" (Electronicat remix) – 7:38
4. "Goodnight Lovers" (isan Falling Leaf mix) – 5:53
- The 12" exist as black and red vinyl.

=== CD: Mute / CDBong33 (UK) ===
1. "Goodnight Lovers" – 3:48
2. "When the Body Speaks" (acoustic) – 6:00
3. "The Dead of Night" (Electronicat remix) – 7:38
4. "Goodnight Lovers" (isan Falling Leaf mix) – 5:53
- All songs written by Martin L. Gore.

== Charts ==
Weekly chart performance for "Goodnight Lovers"
Chart (2002)	Peak position
Australia (ARIA)	113
Denmark (Tracklisten)	7
France (SNEP)	64
Germany (GfK)	15
Italy (FIMI)	16
Spain (PROMUSICAE)	4
Sweden (Sverigetopplistan)	33
Switzerland (Schweizer Hitparade)	69
