= Enjoy the Silence =

1990 single by Depeche Mode

Single by Depeche Mode

from the album Violator
- B-side: "Memphisto"; "Sibeling"
- Released: 5 February 1990
- Recorded: 1989
- Studio: Puk (Gjerlev); Logic (Milan)
- Genre: Synth-pop; synth-rock; alternative rock
- Length: 6:12 (album version); 4:15 (single version); 7:18 (12-inch version)
- Label: Mute
- Songwriter: Martin Gore
- Producers: Depeche Mode; Flood

Depeche Mode singles chronology
"Personal Jesus" (1989)	"Enjoy the Silence" (1990)	"Policy of Truth" (1990)

Music video
- "Enjoy the Silence" on YouTube

"Enjoy the Silence" is a song by the English electronic music band Depeche Mode. Written by Martin Gore and recorded in 1989, it was released as the second single from their seventh studio album, Violator (1990), on 5 February 1990 by Mute Records. The song topped the charts of European Hit Radio, Denmark and Spain, and is the band's highest-charting single in the United States, peaking at number eight on the Billboard Hot 100 and number two on the Cash Box Top 100.

Originally written as a ballad, band member Alan Wilder saw the potential for the song as a dance-floor hit, and re-arranged the song with producer Flood into the form it was released.

Their best-selling single, it is included in several "best of" lists, including coming in at number one on Billboard magazine's list of top Depeche Mode songs ever. It won Depeche Mode their first award in the category of Best British Single at the Brit Awards 1991. The accompanying music video for the song was directed by Anton Corbijn and features singer Dave Gahan, dressed as a king, wandering the countryside with a deckchair.

"Enjoy the Silence" was re-released as a single in 2004 for the Depeche Mode remix project Remixes 81–04, and was titled "Enjoy the Silence (Reinterpreted)" or, more simply, "Enjoy the Silence 04".

== Background ==
Following the successful releases of their previous album, Music for the Masses in 1987 and a live album 101 in early 1989, Depeche Mode reconvened in 1989 in a studio in Milan, Italy to record material for their new album. The band had invited Mark Ellis, known professionally as Flood, to be co-producer of the new album alongside the band. The sessions in Milan resulted in the song "Personal Jesus", which was released as a single in August 1989 before the rest of the album was completed. Following the Milan sessions, the band moved to Puk Recording Studios in Denmark to record the rest of their new material.

== Recording ==
=== Initial demo ===
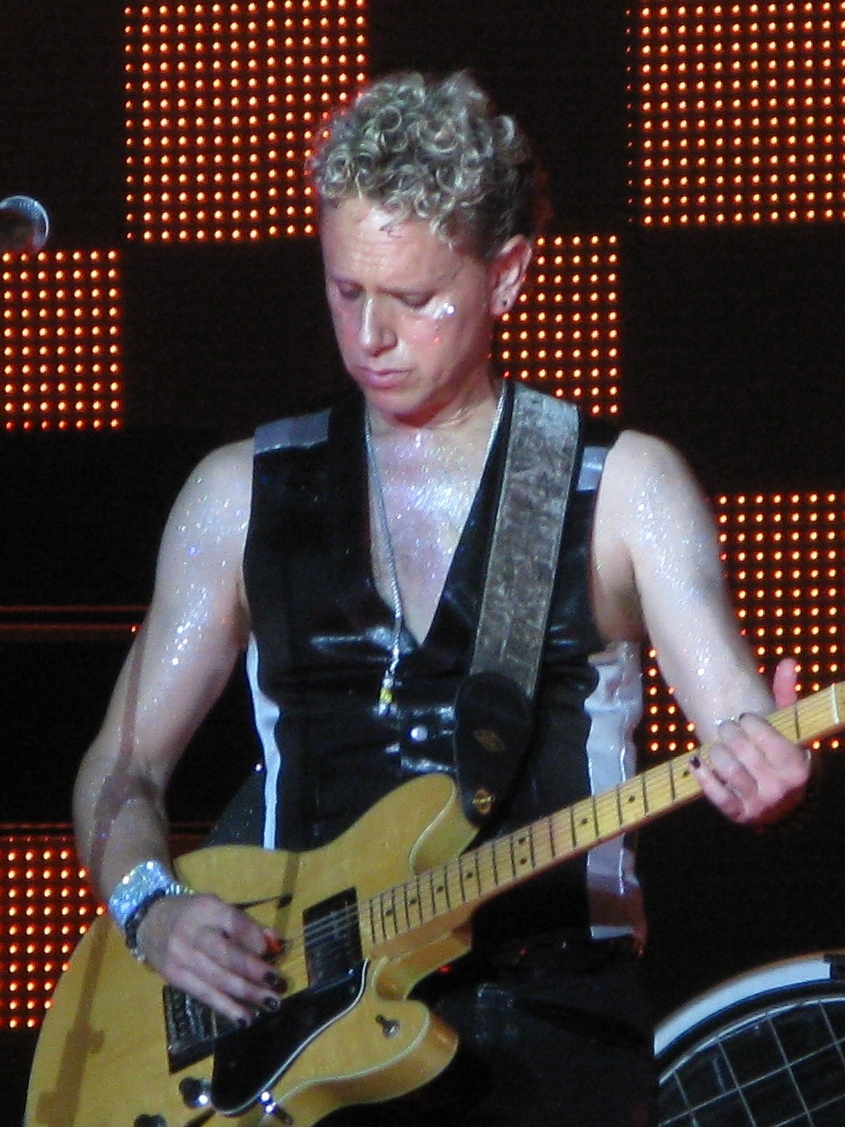
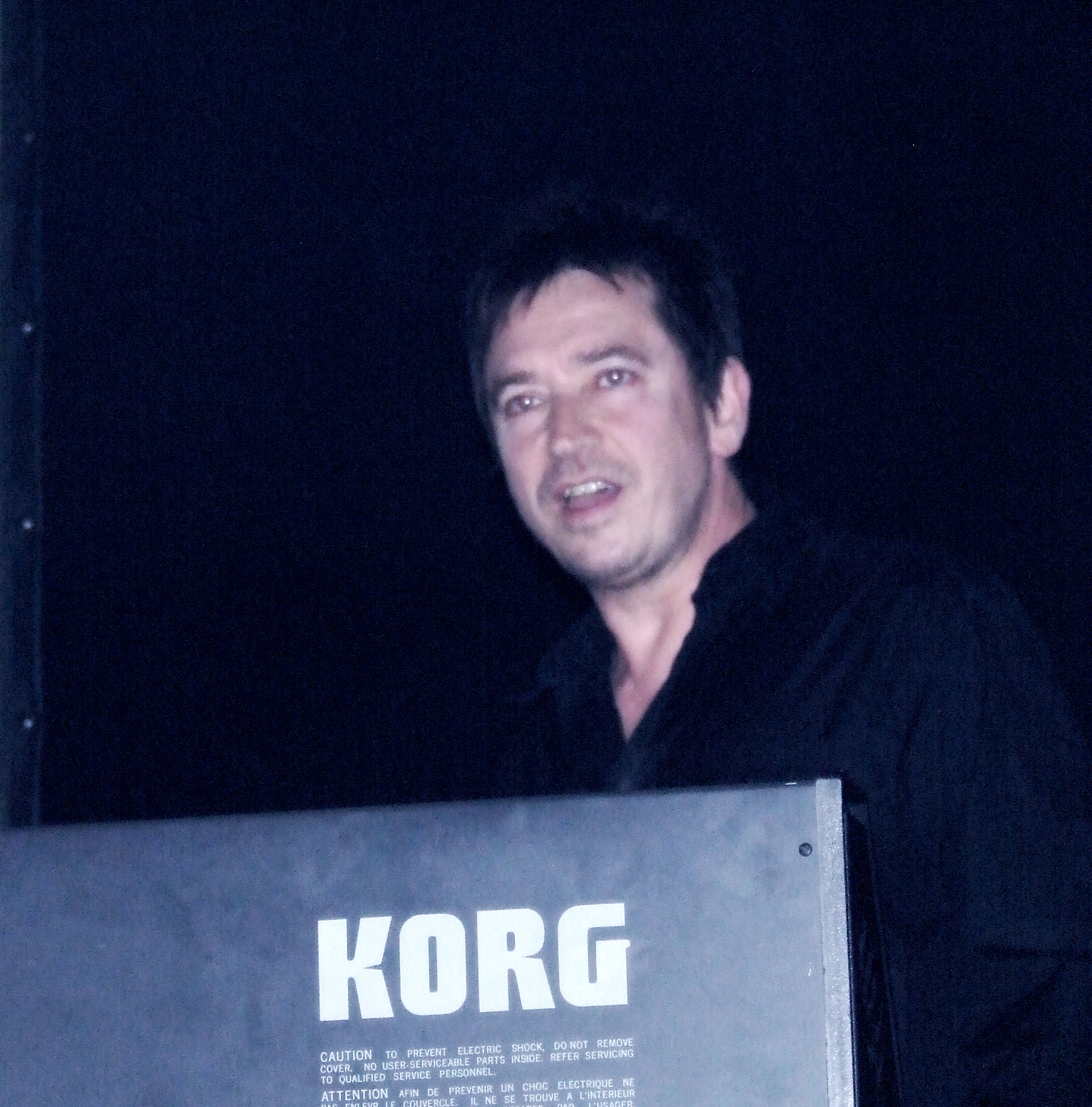
Martin Gore, left, is the band's primary songwriter and wrote "Enjoy the Silence". Alan Wilder, right, was primarily responsible for the song's final version.

As songwriter for the band, Martin Gore typically brought in demos of new material for the band to listen to before they started official recording sessions. At the request of the rest of the band, for these sessions, Gore brought in very simple demos to allow the band more freedom to reimagine the tracks in the studio, one of which was a ballad called "Enjoy the Silence". The demo was performed on a Harmonium with just Gore's voice. (Note: The "Harmonium" version of the song, released on some formats, is loosely based on the demo version of the song.) Gore said that "it was clear to everyone that this was a good melody, but in some way we weren't going to get the best thing out of the song by re-creating that [demo]." Along with the band and Flood, Mute Records owner and former co-producer Daniel Miller heard the demo. Said Miller later, "In that [demo] form, I remember it, but not as something that made me think that it was going to be a key moment in their career."

Of the song's meaning, Gore said "It's just about a feeling of not wanting anything else, feeling totally satisfied, when even words are an intrusion. You just don't need anything else."

=== Studio version ===
When band member Alan Wilder first heard the demo, he heard the lyric "All I ever wanted" in his head in Neil Tennant's (of the Pet Shop Boys) voice. Said Wilder, "It occurred to me that it could work brilliantly as a sort of up-tempo dance track. ... I think the others were a little dubious, but after a little bit of persuasion they said, 'Well, why don't you and Flood put together something that you think will be appropriate for this track, and we'll go away and come back when you're ready to play it to us.'" Gore was especially resistant to the proposed change, saying "The song was called 'Enjoy the Silence' and you know that seemed to be in total contrast with [it being turned into] a disco track", adding later that "It's supposed to be about serenity, and serenity doesn't go with a disco beat." Flood and Wilder had established a working relationship in Italy that often required the rest of the band to be absent during their experimentation, and when it came time to try and work on "Enjoy the Silence", they asked singer Dave Gahan, Gore and Andy Fletcher to leave to give them the time and space to work on the track. Gahan remembers, years later, that Flood and Wilder "told Fletch[er], Martin [Gore] and me to go away." Gore said he sulked "for two days" when they asked him to give them time to work on the track.

Flood and Wilder spent time putting the up-tempo version of the song together, with Wilder later saying that "most [Depeche Mode] songs changed tempo to some degree from the original demo, although none I can think of have been that extreme." When they were ready, they invited Gore back into the studio to record the guitar riff. Gahan remembered that once Gore had the riff down, it inspired him to sing the lyrics, saying "I sang the song, and everyone was surprised that I sang it so well – including myself!" Fletcher later said that the whole thing came together in about an hour, and once it did, he said "we knew we had a massive hit record!" He later called the moment they put the song together in its final form "one of the most magical moments I've ever had with Depeche Mode." Gore later said that recording this song "was the only time ever in the studio when we thought we had a hit single."

After the initial recording, the band spent some time trying to make it better. Said Gahan, "We spent a week trying to make it into something ... and in the end, of course, we came right round, full circle, and it was like, 'Well, it sounded really good the first day that we recorded it.'" The song was originally mixed by François Kevorkian, who mixed the rest of Violator. Although the band were happy with the original mix, they gave final mixing to Miller at his behest. Wilder thought the original mix was superior, saying, "Funnily enough, our most successful single ever was one of the flattest, dullest-sounding mixes".

== Release and promotion ==
"Enjoy the Silence" was released as a single on 5 February 1990. (Note: Burmeister and Lange's biography Depeche Mode: Monument lists the release date for the single as 20 February 1990.) In the UK, the release was handled by Mute Records. The single was released as a Cassingle, on 7-inch vinyl with catalogue number 7BONG18, 12-inch vinyl (12BONG18) and limited 12-inch vinyl (L12BONG18), and, for the first time, an "extremely limited" 12-inch vinyl single, given catalogue number XL12BONG18. Remixes were created by Miller, Phil Legg, and Kevorkian, and on the extremely limited 12-inch vinyl release, the Quad mix was created with input from four remixers: Tim Simenon, Holger Hiller, Gareth Jones and Mimi Izumi Kobayashi; this vinyl single had the remix pressed one side, and on the other, a laser etching of the single's cover art, which was not playable. The single was also supported by two promotional releases: the band's first, albeit promotional-only CD-format single (CDBONG18R); and a 12-inch vinyl single (P12BONG18).

B-sides to the single were original, new instrumentals "Sibeling" and "Memphisto." The title of "Sibeling" refers to Finnish classical composer Jean Sibelius. According to Martin Gore, "Memphisto is the name of an imaginary film about Elvis as a Devil, that I created in my mind", and is a portmanteau of "Memphis" (where Elvis lived at Graceland) and "Mephisto".

Within a week of its release, "Enjoy the Silence" was number six on the UK singles chart. It became Depeche Mode's highest charting single ever in the United States, peaking at number eight on the Billboard Hot 100 in July 1990.

On the album, the song was slotted in as the first song on the second side of the album, and the sixth song overall. Between "Enjoy the Silence" and the next album track "Policy of Truth" is a hidden song, "Interlude #2 (Crucified)", for which Gahan provided guitar, a first for the singer on a Depeche Mode album.

Starting in December 1989 and through the first three months of 1990, Depeche Mode performed "Enjoy the Silence" on European music shows such as Countdown in the Netherlands, Rock 'o' Pop in Spain, Surprise Surprise in France, and Peter's Pop Show in Germany. In 1990, a promotional video for "Enjoy the Silence" was shot by French TV (for the TV Show "Champs-Élysées" with Michel Drucker) featuring Depeche Mode lip-synching the song while standing on the observation deck atop the South Tower of the original World Trade Center in New York City.

The song won the award for Best British Single at the Brit Awards 1991, the first such award for the band in their history. In 2006, the band described the song as "the most successful single in [Depeche Mode's] history."

=== Music video ===
The music video for the single was created and directed by Anton Corbijn. The video featured shots of Gahan, dressed as a king, walking through various settings with a lawn chair under his arm, trying to find a spot to relax. Corbijn said "There was something about 'Enjoy the Silence' that I thought of a king as a symbol of somebody who has everything. He looks for something very simple that's available to all of us that doesn't need the money, which is just a quiet place to sit." This was normal for the band; Corbijn would often pitch ideas and the band would discuss them. Typically, Wilder is most involved in video discussions, plus Gahan, since he's typically the visual focus of any video. The band was initially against the video idea, feeling that their song, which they sure was going to be a hit, didn't match Corbijn's vision. Of Corbijn's idea, Gahan said "I thought he was mad." However, Corbijn couldn't get the idea out of his head, and insisted, and eventually the band agreed to the idea. For Fletcher, Gore and Wilder, their part in the video only took a few hours in the studio; for Gahan, he had to spend a week walking through locations in costume. Gahan later said of the video shoot, "we were in such remote places, like, five miles up in the Alps walking in the snow, in the Algarve in Portugal on these remote beaches, at Balmoral in Scotland, where we could walk for days and days and not see anyone." Ultimately, the band agreed that the video was among the best they'd ever made.

The video's music track has a different intro than available anywhere else; according to Wilder, the band had a few different intros to the song available, and chose that one for the video "for no particular reason" other than it was available.

== Critical reception ==
Professional ratings
Review scores
Source	Rating
AllMusic	4.5/5 stars

In a retrospective review, Andy Healy from Albumism wrote that the song "combined much loved elements of lush synth beds, haunting melodies, and aching lyrics, which coalesced with house beats and slick guitar lines." He added, "Gahan's vocals are intimate and seductive as they draw you in, with lyrics that examine the quiet satisfaction of a relationship, those tender moments when silence fills the void and your lover is in your arms and the world ceases to exist. There was something inviting. Something powerful in those declarations. Something that you could latch on to and feel a part of." AllMusic editor Tim DiGravina stated that it is one of Depeche Mode's "greatest songs", with a "pristine and lush yet punishing musical environment", and "lyrics of violence and darkness". Upon the release, Bill Coleman from Billboard magazine called it an "engaging charmer" and a "more radio-viable effort" than the group's last hit, "Personal Jesus". He noted further that the track "blends [the] quintet's recognizable techno-pop melodies with trendy house grooves."

Simon Reynolds from Melody Maker wrote, "Depeche studiously keep their finger on the pulse of contemporaneity (the choral synths nod to the New Age thang, the guitars to New Order), but somehow the glum, earnest vibrato in the singer's gullet make this feel very dated: New Romanticism infected with C86 miserablism." David Giles from Music Week commented, "The best Depeche Mode single in years heralds a return to the classic pop approach of their early Eighties hits like 'Everything Counts' in contrast to the electro beat obsession of recent recordings. The song itself is heavily to the fore here, and strong enough, perhaps to furnish the band with their first number one hit." A reviewer from People Magazine said the song is "enriched", "with a strong bass and percussive bottom overwhelming the band’s penchant for thin, ethereal synthesizer motifs." Stephen Gore from Sputnik Music noted the juxtaposition on Violator between "Enjoy the Silence" – where the narrator wants silence from the world as words are "like violence" – and the next song "Policy of Truth", which argues that a successful relationship can only be based on lies.

Pitchfork Media ranked "Enjoy the Silence" number 15 in their list of "Top 200 Tracks of the 90s". Rolling Stone included it in their list of the "500 Best Songs of All Time" in 2021 at No. 415. In 2017, Billboard magazine included "Enjoy the Silence" on their list of Top 20 Depeche Mode songs, coming in at number 1.

== Track listings ==
- UK 7-inch and cassette single
1. "Enjoy the Silence" – 4:15
2. "Memphisto" – 4:02
- UK 12-inch and mini-CD single
1. "Enjoy the Silence" (7-inch version) – 4:15
2. "Enjoy the Silence" (Hands and Feet mix) – 7:18
3. "Enjoy the Silence" (Ecstatic dub) – 5:54
4. "Sibeling" – 3:14
- UK limited-edition 12-inch and mini-CD single
1. "Enjoy the Silence" (Bass Line) – 7:40
2. "Enjoy the Silence" (Harmonium) – 2:41
3. "Enjoy the Silence" (Ricki Tik Tik mix) – 5:27
4. "Memphisto" – 4:05
- UK one-track 12-inch and mini-CD single
1. "Enjoy the Silence" (The Quad: Final mix) – 15:30
- US 7-inch and cassette single

A. "Enjoy the Silence" (single mix) – 4:15
B. "Memphisto" – 4:05

- US 12-inch and maxi-cassette single

A1. "Enjoy the Silence" (The Quad: Final mix) – 15:27
A2. "Enjoy the Silence" (Ecstatic dub) – 5:54
B1. "Enjoy the Silence" (Bass Line) – 7:40
B2. "Enjoy the Silence" (Hands and Feet mix) – 7:20
B3. "Memphisto" – 4:05

- US maxi-CD single
1. "Enjoy the Silence" (single mix) – 4:15
2. "Enjoy the Silence" (Hands and Feet mix) – 7:20
3. "Sibeling" – 3:20
4. "Enjoy the Silence" (Bass Line) – 7:40
5. "Enjoy the Silence" (Ecstatic dub) – 5:54
6. "Memphisto" – 4:05
7. "Enjoy the Silence" (Ricki Tik Tik mix) – 5:35
8. "Enjoy the Silence" (Harmonium) – 2:39

== Charts ==
=== Weekly charts ===
1990–1991 weekly chart performance
Chart (1990–1991)	Peak position
Australia (ARIA)	71
Austria (Ö3 Austria Top 40)	13
Belgium (Ultratop 50 Flanders)	4
Canada Top Singles (RPM)	14
Canada Dance/Urban (RPM)	5
Denmark (IFPI)	1
Europe (Eurochart Hot 100)	2
Europe (European Airplay Top 50)	1
Finland (Suomen virallinen lista)	3
France (SNEP)	9
Ireland (IRMA)	3
Italy (Musica e dischi)	5
Italy Airplay (Music & Media)	1
Luxembourg (Radio Luxembourg)	4
Netherlands (Dutch Top 40)	8
Netherlands (Single Top 100)	5
New Zealand (Recorded Music NZ)	40
Spain (AFYVE)	1
Sweden (Sverigetopplistan)	5
Switzerland (Schweizer Hitparade)	2
UK Singles (Official Charts)	6
US Billboard Hot 100	8
US Cash Box Top 100	2
US Alternative Airplay (Billboard)	1
US Dance Club Songs (Billboard)	6
US Dance Singles Sales (Billboard)	2
West Germany (GfK)	2

2004–2006 weekly chart performance
Chart (2004–2006)	Peak position
Denmark (Tracklisten)	1
France (SNEP)	15
Greece (IFPI)	13
Ireland (IRMA)	40
Italy (FIMI)	10
Spain (Promusicae)	1
Sweden (Sverigetopplistan)	20

2024–2026 weekly chart performance
Chart (2024–2026)	Peak position
Austria Airplay (MusicTrace)	47
Global 200 (Billboard)	184
Greece International (IFPI)	17
Israel International Airplay (Media Forest)	17
Lithuania (AGATA)	30
Poland Airplay (OLiS)	37
Poland Streaming (OLiS)	74

=== Year-end charts ===
Chart (1990)	Position
Belgium (Ultratop)	55
Europe (Eurochart Hot 100)	13
Germany (Media Control)	10
Netherlands (Dutch Top 40)	63
Netherlands (Single Top 100)	48
Sweden (Topplistan)	34
Switzerland (Schweizer Hitparade)	16
US Billboard Hot 100	66
US 12-inch Singles Sales (Billboard)	35
US Modern Rock Tracks (Billboard)	18

== Certifications ==
Region	Certification	Certified units/sales
Denmark (IFPI Danmark)	Platinum	90,000^{‡}
Germany (BVMI)	3× Gold	900,000^{‡}
Italy (FIMI)	2× Platinum	200,000^{‡}
New Zealand (RMNZ)	Platinum	30,000^{‡}
Portugal (AFP)	Gold	20,000^{‡}
Spain (Promusicae)	Platinum	60,000^{‡}
Sweden (GLF)	Gold	25,000^{^}
United Kingdom (BPI)	2× Platinum	1,200,000^{‡}
United States (RIAA)	3× Platinum	3,000,000^{‡}
Streaming
Greece (IFPI Greece)	2× Platinum	4,000,000^{†}
^{^} Shipments figures based on certification alone.^{‡} Sales+streaming figures based on certification alone.^{†} Streaming-only figures based on certification alone.

== Release history ==
Region	Date	Format(s)	Label(s)	Ref.
United Kingdom	5 February 1990	7-inch vinyl; 12-inch vinyl	Mute	
Japan	10 March 1990	Mini-CD	Mute; Alfa	
Australia	19 March 1990	7-inch vinyl; 12-inch vinyl; cassette	Mute; Liberation	

== "Enjoy the Silence 04" ==
"Enjoy the Silence 04"

Single by Depeche Mode and Mike Shinoda

from the album Remixes 81–04
- B-side: "Halo" (Goldfrapp remix)
- Released: 18 October 2004
- Genre: Electronic rock; nu metal
- Length: 3:32
- Label: Mute
- Songwriter: Martin Gore
- Producer: Mike Shinoda

Depeche Mode singles chronology
"Goodnight Lovers" (2002)	"Enjoy the Silence 04" (2004)	"Precious" (2005)

Mike Shinoda solo singles chronology
"It's Goin' Down" (2002)	"Enjoy the Silence 04" (2004)	"Petrified/Remember the Name" (2005)

Music video
- "Enjoy the Silence 04" on YouTube

"Enjoy the Silence" was re-released as a single on 18 October 2004 for the remix project Remixes 81–04 and was entitled "Enjoy the Silence (Reinterpreted)", or "Enjoy the Silence 04". The "Reinterpreted" version was remixed by Mike Shinoda, the rapper and producer for the American band Linkin Park, who played most of the instruments.

=== Music video ===
Mike Shinoda's "Enjoy the Silence 04" was a distortion guitar-driven version of the song. Its animated music video was directed by Uwe Flade. Monitors in the animation show performances of "Enjoy the Silence" excerpted from Devotional and One Night in Paris, as well as footage from a concert from The Singles Tour filmed in Cologne in 1998 for MTV.

=== Track listing ===
- CD: Mute / CDBong34 (EU)
1. "Enjoy the Silence (Reinterpreted)" – 3:32
2. "Halo (Goldfrapp Remix)" – 4:22
- CD: Mute / LCDBong34 (EU)
1. "Enjoy the Silence (Timo Maas Extended Remix)" – 8:41
2. "Enjoy the Silence (Ewan Pearson Remix [Radio Edit])" – 3:33
3. "Something to Do (Black Strobe Remix)" – 7:11
- CD: Mute / XLCDBong34 (EU)
1. "Enjoy the Silence (Richard X Extended Mix)" – 8:22
2. "Enjoy the Silence (Ewan Pearson Extended Remix)" – 8:39
3. "World in My Eyes (Cicada Remix)" – 6:18
4. "Mercy in You (The BRAT Mix)" – 7:03
- 12-inch: Mute / 12Bong34 (EU)
1. "Enjoy the Silence (Timo Maas Extended Remix)" – 8:41
2. "Enjoy the Silence (Ewan Pearson Extended Remix)" – 8:39
- 12-inch: Mute / L12Bong34 (EU)
1. "Something to Do (Black Strobe Remix)" – 7:11
2. "World in My Eyes (Cicada Remix)" – 6:18
3. "Photographic (Rex the Dog Dubb Mix)" – 6:20
- 12-inch: Mute / XL12Bong34 (EU)
1. "Halo (Goldfrapp Remix)" – 4:22
2. "Clean (Colder Version)" – 7:09
3. "Little 15 (Ulrich Schnauss Remix)" – 4:52
- 12-inch: Reprise / 42757-0 (US)
1. "Enjoy the Silence (Timo Maas Extended Remix)" – 8:41
2. "Enjoy the Silence (Ewan Pearson Extended Remix)" – 8:39
3. "Enjoy the Silence (Richard X Extended Mix)" – 8:22
4. "World in My Eyes (Cicada Remix)" – 6:18
- CD: Reprise / 42757-2 (US)
1. "Enjoy the Silence (Reinterpreted)" – 3:32
2. "Enjoy the Silence (Timo Maas Extended Remix)" – 8:41
3. "Enjoy the Silence (Ewan Pearson Extended Remix)" – 8:39
4. "Enjoy the Silence (Richard X Extended Mix)" – 8:22
5. "World in My Eyes (Cicada Remix)" – 6:18
6. "Something to Do (Black Strobe Remix)" – 7:11

=== Personnel ===
- Dave Gahan – lead vocals
- Mike Shinoda – piano, guitars, keyboards, bass, drums, synthesizers
- Martin Gore – backing vocals
- Rob Bourdon – drums

=== Charts ===
==== Weekly charts ====
Chart (2004–2005)	Peak position
Austria (Ö3 Austria Top 40)	48
Belgium (Ultratip Bubbling Under Flanders)	9
Belgium (Ultratop 50 Wallonia)	25
CIS Airplay (TopHit)	8
Finland (Suomen virallinen lista)	13
Germany (GfK)	5
Hungary (Rádiós Top 40)	25
Ireland (IRMA)	40
Italy (FIMI)	10
Netherlands (Dutch Top 40 Tipparade)	6
Netherlands (Single Top 100)	46
Russia Airplay (TopHit)	5
Scottish Singles Sales (Official Charts)	10
Sweden (Sverigetopplistan)	31
Switzerland (Schweizer Hitparade)	44
UK Singles (Official Charts)	7
US Dance Club Songs (Billboard)	25
US Dance Singles Sales (Billboard)	1

Chart (2026)	Peak position
France (SNEP)	188

==== Year-end charts ====
Chart (2004)	Position
CIS (TopHit)	36
Germany (Media Control GfK)	79
Russia Airplay (TopHit)	20

Chart (2005)	Position
US Dance Singles Sales (Billboard)	5

== See also ==
- List of European number-one airplay songs of the 1990s
