= Dream On (Depeche Mode song) =

2001 single by Depeche Mode

Single by Depeche Mode

from the album Exciter
- B-side: "Easy Tiger"; "I Feel Loved"
- Released: 17 April 2001
- Studio: RAK (London); Sarm West (London); Sound Design (Santa Barbara, California); Electric Lady (New York City); Sony (New York City)
- Genre: Electronica
- Length: 4:19 (album version); 3:41 (single version)
- Label: Mute
- Songwriter: Martin L. Gore
- Producer: Mark Bell

Depeche Mode singles chronology
"Only When I Lose Myself" (1998)	"Dream On" (2001)	"I Feel Loved" (2001)

Music video
- "Dream On" on YouTube

"Dream On" is a song by English electronic music band Depeche Mode. It was released in the United States on 17 April 2001 and in the United Kingdom on 23 April 2001 as the first single from the band's tenth studio album, Exciter (2001). The song topped the charts of Denmark, Germany, Italy and Spain and reached the top 10 in Austria, Canada, Finland, Norway, Portugal, Sweden, the United Kingdom and Wallonia. The song's music video was directed by Stéphane Sednaoui.

== Critical reception ==
In a review for Billboard magazine, Eric Aiese said of "Dream On", "It's hard to remember the last time the group did anything so organic, and 'Dream On' proves to be surprisingly refreshing. The guitar line is a catchy head-bobber, and the minimal melody sounds like a winner". Another review from the same magazine called the track "rock-solid". The song is rated three out of five stars on AllMusic, with reviewer Ned Raggett comparing the composition to works by Timbaland and noting that Dave Gahan's lyrical delivery was "one of his best".

Music & Media named it their "Pick of the Week" on their 7 April 2001 issue, with Ville Vilén of Radiomafia complimenting the "classic" songwriting with its "modern" sound. Kristian Bartos of Swedish radio station WOW! 105.5 said that although the song would take a second listen to appreciate fully, it would become a "long-lasting" single. Sandra Boussu, head of music at FM Limburg in Belgium, gave the song a positive review but doubted that "Dream On" would become a hit in Europe, citing Depeche Mode's stylistic changes. British trade paper Music Week compared the song to Björk's album Homogenic (1997), noting its "nagging acoustics" and "slithery dark beats".

== Chart performance ==
In the band's native United Kingdom, "Dream On" debuted at its peak of number six on the week beginning 29 April 2001, topping the UK Indie Singles Chart the same week. It quickly fell down the UK Singles Chart after its debut, staying in the top 40 for only two weeks and the top 100 for nine weeks. In Ireland, it debuted on the Irish Singles Chart on 26 April, peaking at number 24 and spending two weeks on the chart. Across Europe, the single made chart-topping debuts in Denmark, Germany, Italy, and Spain, staying one week at the top in the first three countries and remaining at number one for three weeks in Spain. In Finland, Hungary, Portugal, and Sweden, the track reached the top five, while in Austria, Greece, Norway, and the Wallonia region of Belgium, it charted within the top 10. It additionally became a top-40 hit in Flanders, France, the Netherlands, and Switzerland. On the Eurochart Hot 100, it reached number five.

Outside Europe, the song charted in the United States and Canada. In the latter country, it first appeared on the Canadian Singles Chart at number two, its peak, on the issue dated 19 May 2001. In the United States, "Dream On" reached number one on both the Billboard Maxi-Singles Sales and Dance Club Play charts; on the former listing, the single became their second number-one hit, after "Policy of Truth" in 1990. On the Billboard Hot 100, it peaked at number 85 on 12 May, totalling 10 weeks in the top 100. It also peaked within the top 20 on the Triple-A, Adult Top 40, and Modern Rock Tracks charts.

== Track listings ==
UK and European CD single

1. "Dream On" (single version) – 3:41
2. "Easy Tiger" (full version) – 4:56
3. "Easy Tiger" (Bertrand Burgalat & A.S. Dragon version) – 4:51

UK and European limited-edition CD single

1. "Dream On" (Bushwacka Tough Guy mix)
2. "Dream On" (Dave Clarke acoustic version)
3. "Dream On" (Octagon Man mix)
4. "Dream On" (Kid 606 mix)

UK and European 12-inch single

A1. "Dream On" (Bushwacka Tough Guy mix) – 6:08
B1. "Dream On" (Dave Clarke remix) – 5:14
B2. "Dream On" (Bushwacka Blunt mix) – 6:49

US and Canadian maxi-CD single

1. "Dream On" (single version) – 3:39
2. "Easy Tiger" (Bertrand Burgalat & A.S. Dragon version) – 4:52
3. "Dream On" (Bushwacka Tough Guy vocal mix) – 6:07
4. "Dream On" (Bushwacka Blunt mix) – 6:47
5. "Dream On" (Dave Clarke club mix) – 5:13

US 2×12-inch single

A1. "Dream On" (Bushwacka Tough Guy vocal mix) – 6:08
A2. "Dream On" (Dave Clarke acoustic mix) – 4:24
B1. "Dream On" (Dave Clarke club mix) – 5:13
B2. "Dream On" (Kid 606 mix) – 4:45
C1. "Dream On" (Bushwacka Blunt mix) – 6:48
C2. "Dream On" (Octagon Man mix) – 5:30
D1. "Dream On" (Bushwacka Tough Guy dub) – 6:08
D2. "Easy Tiger" (Bertrand Burgalat & A.S. Dragon version) – 4:52

== Credits and personnel ==
Credits are lifted from the UK CD single liner notes and the Exciter album booklet.

Studios

- Recorded at RAK, Sarm West (London, England), Sound Design (Santa Barbara, California), Electric Lady, and Sony (New York City)
- Mastered at The Exchange (London, England)

Personnel

- Martin L. Gore – writing
- Mark Bell – production
- Gareth Jones – engineering, pre-production, additional production
- Paul Freegard – pre-production, additional production
- Steve Fitzmaurice – mixing
- Mike Marsh – mastering
- Anton Corbijn – photography, cover art, art direction
- Form – design

== Charts ==
=== Weekly charts ===
Weekly chart performance for "Dream On"
Chart (2001)	Peak position
Austria (Ö3 Austria Top 40)	9
Belgium (Ultratop 50 Flanders)	31
Belgium (Ultratop 50 Wallonia)	10
Canada (Nielsen SoundScan)	2
Denmark (Tracklisten)	1
Europe (Eurochart Hot 100)	5
Finland (Suomen virallinen lista)	3
France (SNEP)	12
Germany (GfK)	1
Greece (IFPI)	6
Hungary (Mahasz)	2
Ireland (IRMA)	24
Italy (FIMI)	1
Netherlands (Dutch Top 40 Tipparade)	12
Netherlands (Single Top 100)	47
Norway (VG-lista)	7
Portugal (AFP)	2
Quebec (ADISQ)	3
Scotland Singles (Official Charts)	11
Spain (Promusicae)	1
Sweden (Sverigetopplistan)	4
Switzerland (Schweizer Hitparade)	13
UK Singles (Official Charts)	6
UK Indie (Official Charts)	1
US Billboard Hot 100	85
US Adult Alternative Airplay (Billboard)	6
US Adult Pop Airplay (Billboard)	15
US Alternative Airplay (Billboard)	12
US Dance Club Songs (Billboard)	1
US Dance Singles Sales (Billboard)	1

=== Year-end charts ===
Year-end chart performance for "Dream On"
Chart (2001)	Position
Canada (Nielsen SoundScan)	21
Canada (Nielsen SoundScan) Parts 1 & 2	121
Spain (AFYVE)	12
US Adult Top 40 (Billboard)	44
US Dance Club Play (Billboard)	22
US Maxi-Singles Sales (Billboard)	21
US Modern Rock Tracks (Billboard)	45
US Triple-A (Billboard)	25

Chart (2002)	Position
Canada (Nielsen SoundScan)	174

== Certifications ==
Region	Certification	Certified units/sales
Denmark (IFPI Danmark)	Gold	4,000^{^}
^{^} Shipments figures based on certification alone.

== Release history ==
Release dates and formats for "Dream On"
Region	Date	Format(s)	Label(s)	Ref.
United States	26 March 2001	Triple-A radio	Reprise; Mute	
United States	27 March 2001	Alternative radio	Reprise; Mute	
United States	17 April 2001	Digital download	Reprise; Mute	
United States	23 April 2001	12-inch vinyl; CD	Reprise; Mute	
United States	23 April 2001	Hot adult contemporary radio	Reprise; Mute	
United Kingdom	23 April 2001	12-inch vinyl; CD	Mute	

== See also ==
- List of number-one songs of the 2000s (Denmark)
- List of number-one hits of 2001 (Germany)
- List of number-one hits of 2001 (Italy)
- List of number-one singles of 2001 (Spain)
- List of Billboard Hot Dance Music/Club Play number ones of 2001
