= Freelove =

2001 single by Depeche Mode

Single by Depeche Mode

from the album Exciter
- B-side: "Zenstation"
- Released: 5 November 2001
- Studio: RAK, Sarm West (London, England); Sound Design (Santa Barbara, California); Electric Lady, Sony (New York City)
- Length: 6:10 (album version); 3:59 (single version)
- Label: Mute
- Songwriter: Martin L. Gore
- Producers: Mark Bell; Flood (single version)

Depeche Mode singles chronology
"I Feel Loved" (2001)	"Freelove" (2001)	"Goodnight Lovers" (2002)

Music video
- "Freelove" on YouTube

"Freelove" is a song by English electronic music band Depeche Mode, released on 5 November 2001 as the third single from the band's tenth studio album, Exciter (2001). "Freelove" reached No. 19 on the UK Singles Chart. The single version, which was produced by Flood, is different than the album version, with a shorter running time and an additional drum track. The B-side is an instrumental called "Zenstation". There is also a DVD release of "Freelove", a first for Depeche Mode. It contains video footage of "Freelove" from the Philadelphia concert in 2001, audio of other songs performed at the concert, and four bonus 30-second videos of the band. The videos were directed by Anton Corbijn.

== Music video ==
The music video for "Freelove" was directed by John Hillcoat and filmed in New Orleans, Louisiana in July 2001 while the group was on tour in the United States. The video features Depeche Mode performing on a parade float riding through a poor neighborhood. The impoverished residents follow the float and climb on it to dance. The video ends with the float and everybody disappearing, except for two people kissing. It has never been made available on a public release until the Video Singles Collection (2016).

== Track listing ==
All songs were written by Martin L. Gore.

UK CD single

1. "Freelove" (Flood mix)
2. "Zenstation"
3. "Zenstation" (Atom's Stereonerd remix)

UK limited-edition CD single

1. "Freelove" (Bertrand Burgalat version)
2. "Freelove" (Schlammpeitziger "Little Rocking Suction Pump Version")
3. "Freelove" (DJ Muggs remix)

UK 12-inch single

A1. "Freelove" (Console remix)
A2. "Freelove" (Schlammpeitziger "Little Rocking Suction Pump Version")
A3. "Zenstation" (Atom's Stereonerd remix)
B1. "Freelove" (Bertrand Burgalat version)
B2. "Freelove" (DJ Muggs remix)

UK and US DVD single

1. "Freelove" (live video)
2. Four short films
3. "Breathe" (live audio)
4. "The Dead of the Night" (live audio)

US maxi-CD single

1. "Freelove" (Flood mix) – 3:59
2. "Freelove" (DJ Muggs remix) – 4:24
3. "Zenstation" – 6:24
4. "Freelove" (Bertrand Burgalat version) – 5:27
5. "Freelove" (Schlammpeitziger "Little Rocking Suction Pump Version") – 6:50
6. "Zenstation" (Atom's Stereonerd remix) – 5:35

== Charts ==
=== Weekly charts ===
Weekly chart performance for "Freelove"
Chart (2001)	Peak position
Australia (ARIA)	110
Austria (Ö3 Austria Top 40)	61
Belgium (Ultratop 50 Wallonia)	30
Denmark (Tracklisten)	5
Europe (Eurochart Hot 100)	19
Finland (Suomen virallinen lista)	11
France (SNEP)	52
Germany (GfK)	8
Greece (IFPI)	13
Ireland (IRMA)	41
Italy (FIMI)	3
Netherlands (Dutch Tipparade 40)	18
Netherlands (Single Top 100)	65
Poland Airplay (Music & Media)	6
Poland (ZPAV)	4
Romania (Romanian Top 100)	12
Scottish Singles Sales (Official Charts)	25
Spain (Promusicae)	3
Sweden (Sverigetopplistan)	20
Switzerland (Schweizer Hitparade)	67
UK Singles (Official Charts)	19
UK Indie (Official Charts)	2
US Dance Club Songs (Billboard)	1
US Dance Singles Sales (Billboard)	1

=== Year-end charts ===
Year-end chart performance for "Freelove"
Chart (2002)	Position
Israel (Galgalatz)	5
US Maxi-Singles Sales (Billboard)	18

== See also ==
- List of Billboard Hot Dance Music/Club Play number ones of 2002
