= I Feel Loved =

2001 single by Depeche Mode

Single by Depeche Mode

from the album Exciter
- B-side: "Dirt"
- Released: 30 July 2001
- Studio: RAK, Sarm West (London, England); Sound Design (Santa Barbara, California); Electric Lady, Sony (New York City)
- Length: 4:20 (album version); 3:41 (single version)
- Label: Mute
- Songwriter: Martin L. Gore
- Producer: Mark Bell

Depeche Mode singles chronology
"Dream On" (2001)	"I Feel Loved" (2001)	"Freelove" (2001)

Music video
- "I Feel Loved" on YouTube

"I Feel Loved" is a song by English electronic music band Depeche Mode, released on 30 July 2001 as the second single from the band's 10th studio album, Exciter (2001). In Australia, it was released as the album's lead single, as "Dream On" was skipped. In 2002, "I Feel Loved" was nominated for two Grammy Awards: one for Best Dance Recording and another for the Danny Tenaglia remix for Best Remixed Recording.

== Music video ==
There are four versions of the music video, one that uses the single version, but with a cold ending, rather than the fading out ending. There are remix videos by Dan-O-Rama, a long version, and a short version. The two remix versions are composed of modified production shots of the original video. The original version wasn't released on a public video until The Best of Videos Volume 1 was released in 2006. The other two aren't on a public release. A version using the Danny Tenaglia radio edit of the song also exists, but was pulled from the official website and the label's efforts to promote it were scrapped.

The original video features Depeche Mode performing in a club in Los Angeles' Chinatown. The setting makes for a hot, sweaty ambience. The club is approached by a set of K9 police, with dogs snapping and angry (for what purpose is unclear). The site security only smiles and lets the policemen by. The audience seems unaware of the snapping, snarling dogs – and the dogs slowly give in to a loving temperament, licking those that pay attention to them. This seems to suggest that the club is full of love and affects all who enter.

== B-side ==
The B-side is a cover of the Stooges song "Dirt". Martin Gore stated on the 101 commentary track: "Over the years, we haven't really covered too many songs. We covered 'Dirt' by the Stooges on one of our B-sides recently. I just think that he always had a sense of humour and this darkness to his music at the same time, which is a hard thing to marry, and I think he always has done that really well."

== Track listing ==
"I Feel Loved" was written by Martin L. Gore. "Dirt" written by Ron Asheton, Scott Asheton, Dave Alexander and Iggy Pop.

UK CD single

1. "I Feel Loved" (single version)
2. "Dirt"
3. "I Feel Loved" (extended instrumental)

UK limited-edition CD single

1. "I Feel Loved" (Danny Tenaglia's Labor of Love edit)
2. "I Feel Loved" (Thomas Brinkmann mix)
3. "I Feel Loved" (Chamber's remix)
4. Enhanced section with four short films, nine exclusive photos, and downloadable wallpaper

UK 12-inch single

A. "I Feel Loved" (Danny Tenaglia's Labor of Love edit)
AA. "I Feel Loved" (Danny Tengalia's Labor of Love dub)

UK limited-edition 12-inch single

A1. "I Feel Loved" (Umek mix)
AA1. "I Feel Loved" (Thomas Brinkmann mix)
AA2. "I Feel Loved" (Chamber's remix)

US maxi-CD single

1. "I Feel Loved" (Danny Tenaglia's Labor of Love edit)
2. "I Feel Loved" (Thomas Brinkmann mix)
3. "I Feel Loved" (Chamber's remix)
4. "I Feel Loved" (extended instrumental)
5. "Dirt"
6. Enhanced section with four short films, nine exclusive photos, and downloadable wallpaper

US 2×12-inch single

A1. "I Feel Loved" (Danny Tenaglia's Labor of Love edit) – 7:57
B1. "I Feel Loved" (Thomas Brinkmann remix) – 5:28
B2. "I Feel Loved" (Chamber's remix) – 6:17
C1. "I Feel Loved" (Danny Tenaglia's Labor of Love instrumental) – 13:42
D1. "I Feel Loved" (extended instrumental) – 8:28
D2. "Dirt" – 4:57

== Charts ==
=== Weekly charts ===
Weekly chart performance for "I Feel Loved"
Chart (2001)	Peak position
Australia (ARIA)	95
Austria (Ö3 Austria Top 40)	44
Belgium (Ultratip Bubbling Under Flanders)	7
Belgium (Ultratop 50 Wallonia)	24
Canada (Nielsen SoundScan)	8
Denmark (Tracklisten)	6
Europe (Eurochart Hot 100)	16
Finland (Suomen virallinen lista)	17
France (SNEP)	39
Germany (GfK)	9
Ireland (IRMA)	27
Ireland Dance (IRMA)	9
Italy (FIMI)	5
Netherlands (Single Top 100)	64
Scotland Singles (OCC)	16
Spain (Promusicae)	4
Sweden (Sverigetopplistan)	16
Switzerland (Schweizer Hitparade)	64
UK Singles (OCC)	12
UK Dance (OCC)	3
UK Indie (OCC)	1
US Dance Club Songs (Billboard)	1
US Dance Singles Sales (Billboard)	4

=== Year-end charts ===
Year-end chart performance for "I Feel Loved"
Chart (2001)	Position
Canada (Nielsen SoundScan)	129
US Dance Club Play (Billboard)	14

== Release history ==
Release dates and formats for "I Feel Loved"
Region	Date	Format(s)	Label(s)	Ref.
United Kingdom	30 July 2001	12-inch vinyl; CD	Mute	
United Kingdom	13 August 2001	Limited-edition 12-inch vinyl	Mute	
United States	14 August 2001	Alternative radio	Reprise; Mute	
Australia	20 August 2001	CD	Mute	
United States	27 August 2001	Hot adult contemporary radio	Reprise; Mute	
United States	28 August 2001	Contemporary hit radio	Reprise; Mute	
