= Fad Gadget discography =

- Studio albums: 10
- Compilation albums: 3
- Singles: 19

This is the discography of British electronic musician Fad Gadget, including releases under his actual name Frank Tovey.

== Albums ==
=== Studio albums ===
Title	Album details	Peak chart positions
Title	Album details	UK Indie
Fireside Favourites	Released: 7 November 1980; Label: Mute; Formats: LP	7
Incontinent	Released: 9 November 1981; Label: Mute; Formats: LP	8
Under the Flag	Released: 18 October 1982; Label: Mute; Formats: LP, MC	14
Gag	Released: February 1984; Label: Mute; Formats: LP, MC	5
As Frank Tovey
Easy Listening for the Hard of Hearing	Released: November 1984; Label: Mute; Formats: LP; With Boyd Rice	—
Snakes & Ladders	Released: May 1986; Label: Mute; Formats: CD, LP, MC	21
Civilian	Released: 13 June 1988; Label: Mute; Formats: CD, LP, MC	—
Tyranny and the Hired Hand	Released: 29 August 1989; Label: Mute; Formats: CD, LP, MC	—
Grand Union	Released: 13 May 1991; Label: Mute; Formats: CD, LP, MC; With the Pyros	—
Worried Men in Second-Hand Suits	Released: 19 October 1992; Label: Mute; Formats: CD, LP; With the Pyros	—
"—" denotes releases that did not chart.

=== Compilation albums ===
Title	Album details	Peak chart positions
Title	Album details	UK Indie
The Fad Gadget Singles	Released: November 1986; Label: Mute; Formats: CD, LP, MC	18
The Best of Fad Gadget	Released: 11 December 2001; Label: Mute; Formats: 2xCD	—
Fad Gadget by Frank Tovey	Released: 11 September 2006; Label: Mute; Formats: 2xCD+2xDVD	—
"—" denotes releases that did not chart.

== Singles ==
Title	Year	Peak chart positions		Album
Title	Year	UK	UK Indie	Album
"Back to Nature"	1979	—	—	Non-album singles
"Ricky's Hand"	1980	—	11	Non-album singles
"Fireside Favourite" / "Insecticide"	1980	—	28	Fireside Favourites
"Make Room"	1981	—	21	Non-album single
"Saturday Night Special"	1982	—	22	Incontinent
"King of the Flies"	1982	—	17	Incontinent
"Life on the Line"	1982	—	10	Under the Flag
"For Whom the Bells Toll"	1983	182	32	Under the Flag
"I Discover Love"	1983	105	15	Non-album single
"Collapsing New People"	1984	85	5	Gag
"One Man's Meat"	1984	92	21	Gag
As Frank Tovey
"Luxury"	1985	—	20	Snakes & Ladders
"Luddite Joe"	1986	—	44	Snakes & Ladders
"Immobilise" (as part of Mkultra)	1987	—	—	Non-album single
"Bridge St. Shuffle"	1988	—	—	Civilian
"Sam Hall"	1989	—	—	Tyranny and the Hired Hand
"The Liberty Tree" (with the Pyros)	1991	—	—	Grand Union
"Fireside Favourite" (I Monster remix; as Fad Gadget)	2001	—	—	The Best of Fad Gadget
"Collapsing New People" (WestBam remix; as Fad Gadget)	2003	—	—	Herr Lehmann (OST)
"—" denotes releases that did not chart.

=== Other releases ===
Title	Year	Notes
"King of the Flies"	1981	Released as a flexi disc with Flexipop magazine, split with "Sometimes I Wish I Was Dead" by Depeche Mode
"Untitled"	1983	Released as a flexi disc with Dutch Vinyl magazine, split with "March of the Iron Workers" by Mecano
"The Brotherhood"	1988	12" promotional and limited release of remixes of the track from Civilian
"All That Is Mine" (with the Pyros)	1992	Promotional CD single from Worried Men in Second-Hand Suits
"Ricky's Hand" (vs Dr. Motte)	1999	Limited Germany-only white label release
