= Snakes and Ladders (Frank Tovey album) =

Studio album by Frank Tovey
- Released: May 1986, re-released 2001
- Recorded: 1985
- Studio: Splendid Studios, London
- Genre: New wave
- Label: Mute Records STUMM 23
- Producer: Frank Tovey, E.C. Radcliffe

Frank Tovey chronology
Snakes and Ladders (1986)	The Fad Gadget Singles (1986)

Snakes and Ladders is the fifth studio album by Frank Tovey. The 1986 release was the first album credited under his own name as opposed to Fad Gadget, used for his first four albums.

The original North American vinyl release featured the track "Collapsing New People" from the 1984 Fad Gadget album Gag. This track was not included on subsequent CD releases. However, versions of the original vinyl album in some territories included an additional EP featuring four other previously released Fad Gadget tracks (one from each album, though "Collapsing New People" not among them), and these tracks were used on CD releases, along with the single B-sides "Bed of Nails" and "Clean This Act Up".

== Track listing ==
All tracks composed by Frank Tovey except where noted.

=== Original LP release ===
1. "The Cutting Edge" (Frank Tovey, Daniel Miller)
2. "Snakes and Ladders"
3. "The Cutting Edge" (Reprise) (Frank Tovey, Daniel Miller)
4. "Shot in the Dark"
5. "Concrete"
6. "Luxury" (Frank Tovey, David Simmonds, Nick Cash)
7. "Small World"
8. "Luddite Joe"
9. "Megalomaniac"

("Collapsing New People" on North American vinyl issues, located before "Luxury" at the beginning of side 2)

=== CD release ===
1. "The Cutting Edge" (Frank Tovey, Daniel Miller)
2. "Snakes and Ladders"
3. "The Cutting Edge" (Reprise) (Frank Tovey, Daniel Miller)
4. "Shot in the Dark"
5. "Concrete"
6. "Luxury" (Frank Tovey, David Simmonds, Nick Cash)
7. "Small World"
8. "Luddite Joe"
9. "Megalomaniac"
10. "Bed of Nails" (B-side of "Luxury" single)
11. "Clean This Act Up" (B-side of "Luddite Joe" single)
12. "Coitus Interruptus" (originally from the 1980 Fad Gadget album Fireside Favourites)
13. "Innocent Bystander" (originally from the 1981 Fad Gadget album Incontinent)
14. "Sheep Look Up" (originally from the 1982 Fad Gadget album Under the Flag)
15. "Ideal World" (originally from the 1984 Fad Gadget album Gag)

== Personnel ==
- Frank Tovey – vocals, guitar, synthesizer
- Davis John Simmonds – keyboards
- Guy Evans – "batphone" and "fibrephone" on "Megalomaniac"
- David John Rhodes – rhythm guitar
- E.C. Radcliffe – lead guitar, rhythm guitar, engineer
- David John Rodgers – bass guitar
- Nicholas John Cash – drums
- Barbara Frost, Nigel Hine, Frank Tovey – backing vocals
