= The Best of Fad Gadget =

Greatest hits album by Fad Gadget
- Released: 11 December 2001
- Recorded: 1979–2000
- Genre: New wave, electronic
- Length: 147:10
- Label: Mute
- Producer: Frank Tovey, Daniel Miller, John Fryer, Gareth Jones

Fad Gadget chronology
Gag (1984)	The Best of Fad Gadget (2001)

Professional ratings
Review scores
Source	Rating
Allmusic	4.5/5 stars
Rock Sound	4/5 stars

The Best of Fad Gadget is a double compilation album of singles and 12" mixes released by Fad Gadget (the stage name of Frank Tovey). The album is split between singles and B-sides on disc one, and 12" mixes and song reworkings on disc two. Mute Records released the album in December 2001, a few months before Frank Tovey's sudden death.

== Track listing ==
=== Disc one ===
1. "Back to Nature"
2. "The Box" B-side of "Back to Nature"
3. "Ricky's Hand"
4. "Handshake" B-side of "Ricky's Hand"
5. "Fireside Favourite"
6. "Insecticide" B-side of "Fireside Favourite"
7. "Make Room"
8. "Lady Shave" Double A-side with "Make Room"
9. "Saturday Night Special"
10. "King of the Flies"
11. "Life on the Line"
12. "4M" B-side of "Life on the Line"
13. "For Whom the Bells Toll"
14. "Love Parasite" B-side of "For Whom the Bells Toll"
15. "I Discover Love"
16. "Collapsing New People"
17. "One Man's Meat"
18. "Luxury" Released as Frank Tovey

=== Disc two ===
1. "Collapsing New People" (Berlin Mix)
2. "Fireside Favourite" (Toasted Crumpet Mix)
3. "Swallow It" (Regurgitated)
4. "Love Parasite 2"
5. "Luxury" (Remix)
6. "For Whom The Bells Toll 3"
7. "I Discover Love" (Extended)
8. "Sleep" (Electro-induced Original)
9. "Life on the Line" (Version 2)
10. "One Mans Meat" (Remix)
11. "Immobilise" (Foot Binding Trot Mix)
12. "Collapsing New People" (London Mix)
