= New Life (song) =

Single by Depeche Mode

from the album Speak & Spell
- B-side: "Shout!"
- Released: 13 June 1981
- Recorded: May 1981
- Studio: Blackwing (London)
- Genre: Synth-pop
- Length: 3:43 (album version); 3:58 (12″ remix)
- Label: Mute
- Songwriter: Vince Clarke
- Producers: Depeche Mode; Daniel Miller

Depeche Mode singles chronology
"Dreaming of Me" (1981)	"New Life" (1981)	"Just Can't Get Enough" (1981)

Alternative cover
- The cover of the 12" single (12MUTE014)

Professional ratings
Review scores
Source	Rating
AllMusic	4/5 stars

"New Life" is the second single by English electronic music band Depeche Mode from their debut studio album Speak & Spell, originally released on 13 June 1981. (Note: One source suggests it was released earlier, around 5 June 1981.) It was the first Depeche Mode single to feature remixes, and was released only in Europe.

== Background and recording ==
Vince Clarke wrote the song, which was recorded at Blackwing Studios. Said singer Dave Gahan, "We learned a lot from 'Dreaming [of Me]', came in here and just did a better job on '[New Life]'." The song includes a four-part harmony similar to The Beatles' "Twist and Shout" that was sung by all four members of the band and witnessed by a journalist from The Face, who reported that non-musical member Andrew Fletcher struggled with the part.

== Release ==
One of several album tracks written before the band officially went into the studio to record the album, "New Life" was the first Depeche Mode single released in the 12" format; the previous single, "Dreaming of Me", was originally only released on 7" vinyl. It was the first single by the band to feature remixes, a staple of all later Depeche Mode single releases. Both "New Life" and "Shout!"'s 12" mixes were done by the band themselves. Said Clarke,

We recorded the 7", and [producer] Daniel Miller made them into 12". 12" in those days weren't about joining tape together - extended mixes weren't even in our vocabulary at that point; 12" were about making the record louder, because on a [7"] single you could only cut the groove so deep. But the deeper the groove is, the louder the record is, so we made 12" to be played at clubs. What we used to do was mix stuff in and out-drop the bass drum out for a couple of bars, or whatever.

The 7" single cover, which featured a person unzipping themselves out of an egg, was designed by Clarke's younger brother Rodney Clarke, who was at the time a student at Southend College of Technology. The cover of the UK 12" sleeve was based on a photo used in the scientific magazine Mind Alive in 1968; the same photo was the basis for the cover of the Black Sabbath album Born Again (1983). In the UK, the single was given the catalogue number 7MUTE014 for the 7" single, 12MUTE014 for the 12" single, and in Germany the catalogue number was INT 111.800 (7") and INT 126.800 (12").

The song's b-side was "Shout!", and its 12" remix was given the name "Rio Mix" only on the English release.

== Release ==
The single became Depeche Mode's breakthrough hit in the UK, peaking at #11, although the band was still disappointed. Gahan said in an interview in June 1981, "We had a sad day ... we expected 'New Life' to go up a bit more." On 25 June 1981, the band performed "New Life" during their debut on the BBC's Top of the Pops, and by 1 August 1981, the single was reported to have sold 200,000 copies.

== Track listing ==
All tracks written by Vince Clarke

7″: Mute / 7Mute14 (UK)

1. "New Life" – 3:43
2. "Shout!" – 3:44

12″: Mute / 12Mute14 (UK)

1. "New Life" (remix) – 3:58
2. "Shout!" (Rio mix) – 7:31
- Re-released in 2018 as a part of the Speak & Spell: The 12″ Singles box set

CD: Mute / Intercord / CDMute14 / INT 826.800 (West Germany) – released in 1988

1. "New Life" (remix) – 3:58
2. "Shout!" (Rio mix) – 7:31
3. "New Life" (7″ version) – 3:43

CD: Mute / CDMute14 (UK) – released in 1991

1. "New Life" (remix) – 3:58
2. "Shout!" – 3:44
3. "Shout!" (Rio mix) – 7:31

CD: Sire / 40290-2 (US) – released in 1991

1. "New Life" (remix) – 3:58
2. "Shout!" – 3:44
3. "Shout!" (Rio mix) – 7:31

== Charts ==
Weekly chart performance for "New Life"
Chart (1981)	Peak position
Ireland (IRMA)	22
UK Singles (Official Charts)	11
UK Indie (MRIB)	1
US Dance Club Songs (Billboard) with "Shout!"	29
