= Speak & Spell (album) =

1981 studio album by Depeche Mode

Studio album by Depeche Mode
- Released: 29 October 1981
- Recorded: 1980−1981
- Studio: Blackwing (London)
- Genres: Synth-pop; new wave; electropop
- Length: 40:42
- Label: Mute
- Producers: Depeche Mode; Daniel Miller

Depeche Mode chronology
Speak & Spell (1981)	A Broken Frame (1982)

Singles from Speak & Spell
- 1. "Dreaming of Me" Released: 20 February 1981; 2. "New Life" Released: 13 June 1981; 3. "Just Can't Get Enough" Released: 7 September 1981

Speak & Spell is the debut studio album by the English electronic music band Depeche Mode. It was released on 29 October 1981 (Note: Sources differ on the album's release date; several publications list the official release date as 29 October, but Depeche Mode's own website lists 5 October) by Mute Records in the UK, and Sire Records in the US. It was the band's only album to feature founding member Vince Clarke.

The album peaked at number 10 on the UK Albums Chart, and was ranked number 991 in the 2000 book All Time Top 1000 Albums.

== Band formation and first singles ==
Vince Clarke and Andrew Fletcher had joined to form a band called "Composition of Sound" and saw Martin Gore play his Moog Prodigy synthesizer at a show at a local pub, after which the three joined up and turned Composition of Sound into an all-synth band, switching partly due to the cheap cost and convenience of the devices. Said Clarke, "Here was an instrument that didn't need its own amp – you could just plug it into the PA", and for local shows, the band would often carry their keyboards, the only equipment required, under their arms to the venue.

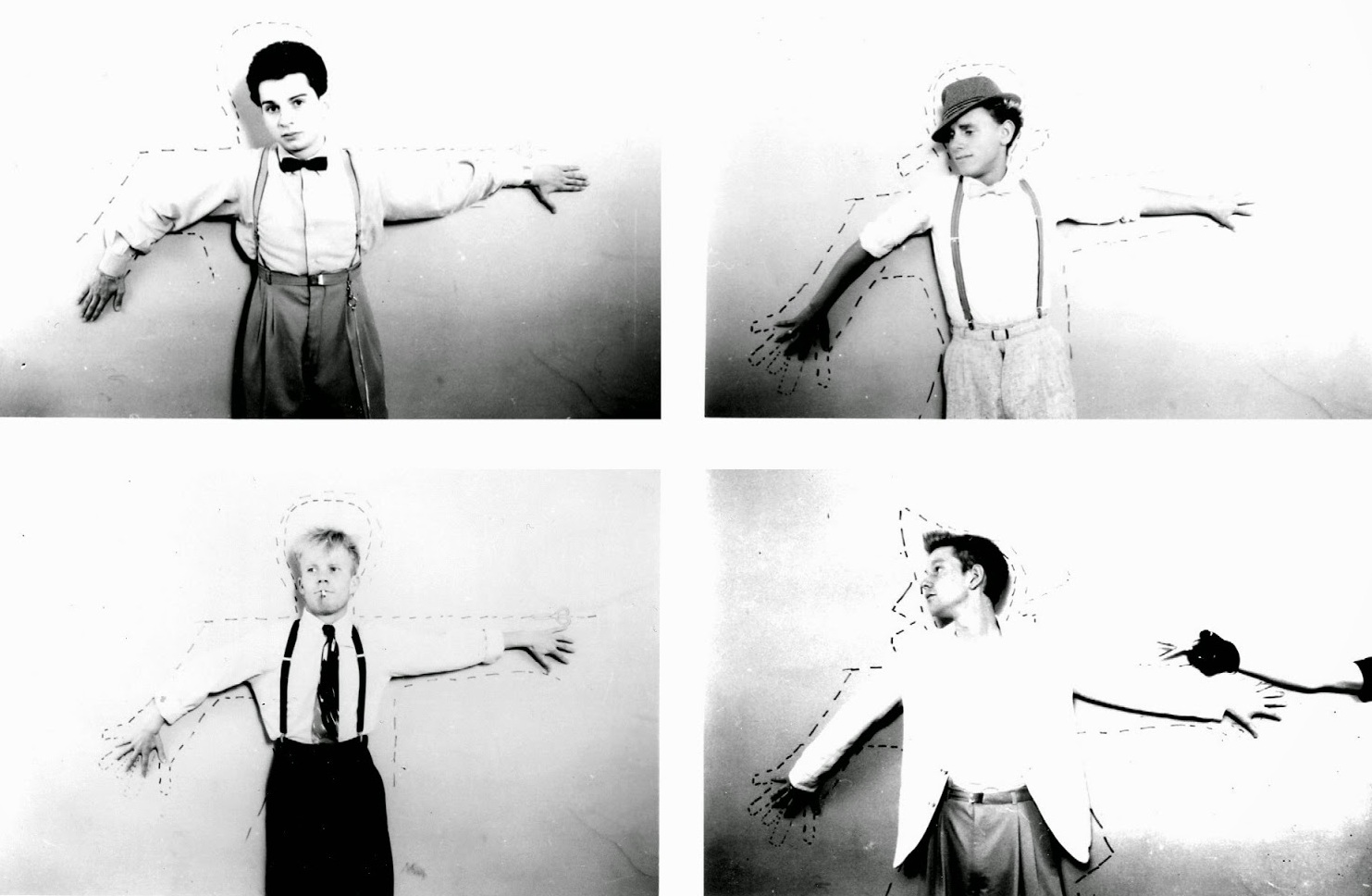
Depeche Mode in 1981; Speak & Spell was the band's only album with original songwriter Vince Clarke, pictured in the bottom-left.

Together they played their first live show on 30 May 1980 in Basildon, UK. At their first show, Clarke was the singer for the band, but he felt that the band needed a front man to make their show more interesting, as Clarke was always standing behind his keyboard. The band auditioned several people to be their singer and selected Dave Gahan, and the band's next show on 14 June 1980 was the first with all four members performing. Said Gore of hiring Gahan, "It wasn't as if he was a total stranger. In fact, we've all known each other since schooldays. It’s much better that way. You can't possibly get on as well with newcomers who've been fixed up from adverts in the music press." (Note: This comment presages the hiring of musician Alan Wilder into the band less than six months later.) By August they had a regular gig booked at a club named Croc's in Rayleigh, Essex, which they played at, amidst other live shows in the UK, for the rest of the year until a New Year's show on 3 January 1981. They officially changed the name of their band to "Depeche Mode" at Gahan's behest, who saw a French fashion magazine of that name; their first show under the new name was played on 29 October 1980 at a show at Ronnie Scott's Jazz Club in London's Soho neighborhood. Gahan claimed that they were the first band to play at Croc's, saying "The resident DJ, Rusty Egan, liked us and so we then got a spot on one of the Thursday nights he was running at the venue." Due to Gore's and Fletcher's work and Gahan's university commitments, the band occasionally had to turn down live show opportunities when their daily schedules interfered. Early live performances by the band included a mix of original songs, such as "Photographic" and "Ice Machine", as well as cover songs by the Beach Boys, Lieutenant Pigeon, the Everly Brothers and Gerry and the Pacemakers.

An offer to appear on an upcoming synthpop sampler album called Some Bizzare Album led the band to record a demo tape with three of their songs, "Ice Machine", "Photographic" and "Radio News". "Photographic", which has the distinction of being the first Depeche Mode song ever recorded in the studio, (Note: "Photographic" was re-recorded for Speak & Spell; the Some Bizzare version of the song would not appear anywhere else until 1998's re-release of The Singles 81→85) was included on Some Bizarre Album (1981).

Depeche Mode's first official single, "Dreaming of Me", was released on 20 February 1981. The band took a few months to tour before returning to the studio in May 1981 to record their second single, "New Life", and its B-side, "Shout!", which was released on 13 June.

On 11 June, just two days before the release of "New Life", the band performed "Boys Say Go!", "Photographic", "Big Muff" and "Tora! Tora! Tora!" on Richard Skinner's BBC One evening radio show, a performance which was broadcast on BBC Radio 1. The band in later years deemed their performance underwhelming and have denied the BBC's repeated requests to release the material from that session.

The band was invited to perform "New Life" on BBC's Top of the Pops (TOTP) after the song climbed to number 11 on the UK charts, which they did on 16 July 1981. After the TOTP performance, the band started to record the rest of Speak & Spell's tracks at Blackwing Studios in London.

=== Joining Mute Records ===
The band searched for a label, but was turned down repeatedly until they were referred to Daniel Miller, who had started his own label, Mute Records. Miller said of the first time he heard Depeche Mode play live, "Fad Gadget had just finished a sound check and normally I would have gone off with them, but for some reason I stayed behind and watched this group who looked like a dodgy New Romantic band. I hated the New Romantics but what came out of the speakers was incredible. I thought, 'Well, everybody plays a good song first' – but it just got better and better." Gahan later said that the band joined the Mute record label after being offered a "50/50 split, which meant we would have to pay half of all our bills, but we'd get half the profits", although Gore clarified in 1989 that the band actually got 75% of the profits in Europe, due to licensing deals. The band had entertained offers from other labels such as CBS Records, Island Records and Phonogram, but dismissed them when they realized, according to Gahan, that the labels "didn't seem bothered about records or anything, they just wanted to add our name to their roster." In 1987, the band reflected on their choice to choose to go with Mute instead of joining a major label; said Gore, "It was quite tempting [to join one of the major labels]. Looking back, I can't imagine why we didn't go with them, it was just a stroke of luck we didn't. I mean, can you imagine four 18 year old boys with no cash being offered sums of money like £200,000? But it was the best decision we ever made. ... We've been given the freedom to do what we want by being on Mute. We're not pushed in any particular direction, and Daniel [Miller] isn't like a record company boss, he comes down to the studio and helps us out. He's more like a friend." Gahan also said the band avoided the offers from labels with advances, because they'd have to pay that money back. Fletcher clarified that "We went for points, percentage of the profits, there's no way a major [label] would have given us the points deal we've got with Mute. We had to go for the first two years without much money, because we didn't get a huge advance."

== Recording ==
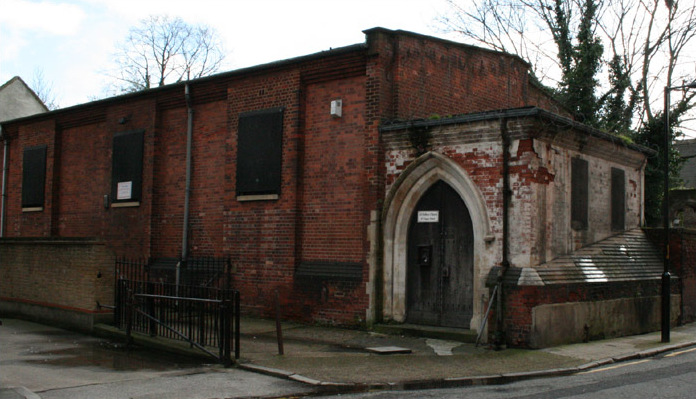
The exterior of Blackwing Studios, where Speak & Spell was recorded (pictured in 2010)

According to Daniel Miller, who co-produced Speak & Spell with the band, it was a collection of songs the band had been playing live over the past year, plus a few new songs, although some songs from their live act did not make it on the record. One song that the band performed live, "Television Set", was co-written by Gore and a friend of the band, and the band likely did not record the song for inclusion on the album to avoid having to pay royalties to the co-writer. Of the songs that were recorded for the album, Clarke wrote most, with Gore contributing two tracks. Gahan recalled that, despite being all-synth, they used them traditionally in their songs, with a lead line, a bass line and a rhythm line. Clarke was the only member of the band without a job during this time, so he and Miller would work on the album during the day, and the others would show up later after they were done with work. Miller brought an analog ARP 2600 synthesizer and sequencer into the studio to record. The studio only had an 8-track system, so the album was essentially recorded live, with little overdubs. Said Miller, "I would capture, as best I could, the atmosphere and the vibes of the songs the way I'd seen them live. Just to have a good electronic pop sound that wasn't a copy of something else." Clarke was the only member of the band interested in the production side of recording. Miller remembered that Gore and Fletcher were far more likely to goof around in the studio while Clarke and Miller worked on putting the songs together, which suited Clarke, who "was not without Control freak tendencies." Fletcher said "[Clarke] always wanted to do a lot in the studio, and the rest of us would feel restricted," noting that it was often uncomfortable for them to challenge Clarke in the studio. Miller and the band tested the final mix of the album by putting the album on cassette tape, getting in sound engineer Eric Radcliffe's car and listening to the album there, figuring that if it sounded good in the car it would sound good on any quality hi-fi system.

Lyrically, Clarke was not concerned about the meanings of his songs, saying "There were no messages in the songs at all – nothing!" He elaborated, saying "I like the sound of words, and the way words fit together and rhyme – things like that. Or the way they sound coming from my mouth. The sound of words rather than the meaning of words. For instance, when I write a phrase or something, I think about how easy it is to sing, to fit in with the melody. ... I can't write like Simon & Garfunkel. I wish I could in some ways, but I can't, so when I write lyrics I just use words as words. I don't really write about anything." Gore said in an interview, that the lyrics are odd because "they don't mean anything. He [Clarke] looks for a melody, then finds words that rhyme."

=== Title ===
Miller suggested the name for the band after the Speak & Spell toy, which had recently become available in the UK. The name was meant to indicate "a band taking its first steps", a nod to the toy's target audience of children.

=== Album cover ===
The album's cover, a "puzzling" picture of a swan wrapped in plastic, was designed by Brian Griffin and earned him a "brazingly inflated" £1000 fee (about £3,900 today). The band had agreed to not show their faces on their album cover, wanting the quality of the artwork to reflect their seriousness as musicians. Griffin would go on to shoot the cover artwork for the rest of Depeche Mode's early- to mid-1980's albums, including A Broken Frame (1982), Construction Time Again (1983), People Are People (1984), and Some Great Reward (1984).

== Release and promotion ==
In May 1981, the band's relationship with Stevo Pearce of the Some Bizarre project soured. They were advertised, but not invited, to play at a live Some Bizarre concert. Said Gahan, "We didn't play the Bizarre evening here at the Lyceum. We were never even approached to play it. It was only when we were advertised that we knew anything about it. We had no intention of doing it at all." Clarke suggested that part of the reason was the name, saying "we're not bizarre. It's the whole sort of thing about being a futurist band and all that crap. There isn't a futurist scene really is there? It's only a name."

On 21 June 1981, the band had their first photoshoot as a group, done by an acquaintance who was an early fan of the band, and shot in Basildon.

In July 1981, the band appeared on a segment on the UK TV show "Twentieth Century Box" on London Weekend Television, (Note: Miller's biography "Stripped: Depeche Mode" claims the date for their appearance on Twentieth Century Box is 22 August 1981) and on 25 July, the band performed their first-ever show outside of England at the Parkpop Festival in The Hague, Netherlands.

In late August/early September 1981, the band performed at the Institute of Contemporary Arts's "Rock Week" alongside The Chefs and Tarzan 5, earning praise in a NME magazine review that said "Depeche [Mode] are danceable, electric, earnest and endearing, young, glowing and sweet, they’ve got more poise than pose, and they’re proud to appeal to all." Accompanying the NME story was a photograph of the band by Anton Corbijn, who went on to help define the band's look in the late 1980's and after, although the picture he took of the band that day bothered Gahan, who was shot out-of-focus from the rest of the band. The second single from the album, and the band's third overall, "Just Can't Get Enough", was released in September 1981 and earned the band another invitation to perform on TOTP after that single went to number 8 in the UK.

Miller entered discussions with Sire Records to release the album in the US; Seymour Stein, CEO of Sire Records, caught Depeche Mode's 28 April 1981 show and was enthused by their live presence, saying "Depeche Mode were the first of those [early synth] bands that were so fucking great live, that it was just amazing."

Promotional poster for the album's release, including tour dates

Depeche Mode will have their album 'Speak And Spell' issued by Mute Records some time next month. They can't give a precise date because, they say, they're waiting for their astrologer to advise them on the most favourable time for release.

— NME magazine, 17 October 1981

The October issue of Flexipop magazine included an insert of the album track "I Sometimes Wish I was Dead" as a promotional push for the impending record's release. Pre-orders for the album reached 80,000 to 100,000 nine days before the album was to be made available. Mute Records released Speak & Spell in the UK on 29 October 1981 with catalogue number STUMM5, (Note: As the first album on Miller's Mute label was a German band, Miller used 'stumm', which is German for 'mute', as his catalogue numbering base.) by Intercord Records in West Germany, and on Dischi Ricordi in Italy with catalogue number MUT10384. In the US, the album was released on 11 November by Sire Records with catalogue number SRK 3642. The original UK release of the album included the track "I Sometimes Wish I Was Dead"; international releases replaced that track with Depeche Mode's first single, "Dreaming of Me". Initial pressings of the Intercord release, with catalogue number INT 146.801, included an Iron-on patch and the back cover featured pictures of all the members of the band. Early pressings of the album in Yugoslavia were missing "I Sometimes Wish I Was Dead" unintentionally, and those early copies turned into collector's items.

There were several promotional releases in various countries of Speak & Spell's tracks: In West Germany, Intercord Records included "New Life" on their Wave News (1981) sampler (catalogue number INT 145.057), and "Big Muff" and "Just Can't Get Enough" saw 7" promotional releases in the US via Sire Records (catalogue numbers PRO-A-1025 and PRO-A-999, respectively). In Canada, Warner Music Group released "Dreaming of Me" as a 7" promo with "Any Second Now (Voices)" as its B-side (catalogue number PRO 0610), and "Just Can't Get Enough" with "Tora! Tora! Tora!" as its B-side (catalogue number PRO 50029) in January 1982. In addition, in Canada, "Dreaming of Me" also appeared on Warner's promotional WEA Sampler released in early 1982 with catalogue number SAM 6. In Japan, Warner-Pioneer released "Just Can't Get Enough" on 7" promotional vinyl with catalogue number P-1662.

=== Tour and Clarke's departure ===
In support of the album, the band participated in press interviews with a variety of UK and European magazines, including Smash Hits and Daily Star. An interview with the latter went badly for Clarke, when he was misquoted, which started a rift between him and the rest of the band, who continued with interviews and did not care about how the press covered (or mis-covered) the band. An interview in late October 1981 with the rest of the band by Record Mirror noted Clarke's absence, saying his absence was "conspicuous... He's still smarting from an obvious trap he walked into when being interviewed by the sensational Daily Star. And won't talk to the Press anymore. This was some time ago and his colleagues feel it's time he bucked up." When an interviewer for Melody Maker managed to catch Clarke for a question in November 1981, he demurred, leaving the interviewer to say "[Clarke] is seemingly less interested in talking about music than doing it." By the time the European leg of the Speak & Spell Tour was about to start, Clarke and the rest of the band were barely on speaking terms. The rift between Clarke and the rest of the band continued to grow; Gore, Gahan and Fletcher later recalled that at one point, Clarke had brought demos of new songs he wanted to record to them which they rejected. Internally, the band worked as a democracy and split profits equally among all the members of the band. As a result, by the time the album was released in October, Clarke wanted to leave the band.

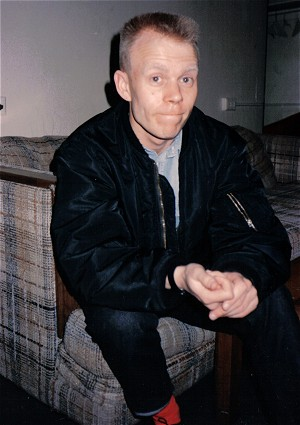
A picture of Vince Clarke, pictured in 1986, five years after he left Depeche Mode

Depeche Mode continued to play live shows throughout 1981 while recording their album; the Speak & Spell Tour officially started on 31 October 1981 and lasted through early December. The agency responsible for booking the tour encouraged the band to book nearly thirty dates, but the band pushed back and only booked about half that, looking to stem off exhaustion from playing late into the night. Said Gahan, "we mainly play clubs and so don’t get to bed until two [in the morning]." As the band was negotiating with American label Sire Records for a contract, news of Clarke's impending departure was kept confidential until after the contract was signed. Blancmange was the opening band for the UK leg of the tour. When the band returned to Basildon for a stop on their tour, the local newspaper printed a story titled "Hero's Welcome for Four Boys in the Band" and reported that the tour required three vehicles to bring along the gear and the fifteen people in the crew and both bands. On tour, the band continued to play some of their original songs that remain unreleased, including tracks "Radio News", "Reason Man", "Tomorrow's Dance" and "Addiction". Gahan and Gore's girlfriends, Jo Fox and Anne Swindell, helped sell merchandise and liaised between fans and the band.

The band finished their UK tour and played their last live show with their original lineup on 3 December 1981, and Clarke left shortly after. No official reason was given for Clarke's departure; publications speculated that Clarke merely preferred the quiet of recording in a studio and shied away from live performances and press interviews. After quitting, Clarke responded to a classified ad from Alison Moyet and the two collaborated to start the band Yazoo. Fletcher said "the general atmosphere [within the band] had been getting really bad. It was like us three, and Vince on his own. He just felt that we were becoming public property, he didn't like what was happening to Depeche Mode, didn't like being famous and didn't like touring." A few years later, Gore suggested that Clarke may have left because he wanted to work in a band where he had more creative control. In 1990, Gahan recounted the Speak & Spell years, saying "I think [Clarke] had just taken it as far as he could. We were very successful. We were in every pop magazine. We were on the TV shows. Everything was going right for Depeche Mode. Everybody wanted to know about Depeche Mode. I think Vince suddenly lost interest in it – and he started getting letters from fans asking what kind of socks he wore," calling any other excuse that Clarke supposedly offered "bullshit." Clarke would later blame his ego for the decision, saying "I felt I was the person doing most of the work, and was the most committed. And I probably felt I could do it [recording an album] all on my own."

After Clarke had left, the band did not consider breaking up, as they had left their old lives behind and had no desire to return to work or school. Instead, they looked to Gore, who had written two tracks for Speak & Spell, to continue as their songwriter, and Fletcher to take over the management aspects of the band. Although the breakup wasn't painted as acrimonious in the press, Gahan said later that "it wasn't amicable at all. There was a lot of bad feeling on both parts. It was about a year before it finally died down, and until then it was pretty vile." Years later, Gore said "I think we should have been slightly more worried than we were. When your chief songwriter leaves the band, you should worry a bit. I suppose that's one of the good things about being young. If we had panicked, we probably wouldn't be here today." Over the next few years, there was a mild rivalry between label-mates Depeche Mode and Yazoo, to see whose single would perform better on the music charts.

== Reception ==
Professional ratings
Review scores
Source	Rating
AllMusic	4/5 stars
Pitchfork	7.5/10
Record Mirror	5/5 stars
Rolling Stone	2.5/5 stars
The Rolling Stone Album Guide	4/5 stars
Smash Hits	7/10
Sounds	4.5/5 stars
Spin Alternative Record Guide	7/10
Uncut	3/5 stars
The Village Voice	C+

Upon its release, Speak & Spell received generally positive reception from critics. Record Mirror praised Depeche Mode's smart simplicity and noted the album offers "much to admire and little to disappoint." Reviewer Sunie commented that the band's chief skill "lies in making their art sound artless; simple synthesiser melodies, Gahan's tuneful but undramatic singing and a matter-of-fact, gimmick-free production all help achieve this unforced effect." As a whole she describes it as "a charming, cheeky collection of compulsive dance tunes". Mike Stand of Smash Hits wrote: "Synthesisers and bubblegum go together like tinned peaches and Carnation, hence [Depeche Mode's] hit singles: melody, uncluttered electronics and nice voices in humanising harmony." Paul Morley of the New Musical Express described the album as "generous, silly, susceptible electro-tickled pop... that despite its relentless friskiness and unprincipled cheerfulness is encouraging not exasperating", noting the music's "diverting vitality", and concluding that "Depeche Mode, apparently, could quickly move... far up and away from constructing slightly sarcastic jingles."

Depeche Mode may not be the most remarkably boring group ever to walk the face of the earth, but they're certainly in the running. Their sophisticated nonsense succeeds only in emphasising just how hilariously unimaginative they really are.

— Steven Patrick Morrissey, in a contemporary newspaper review of Depeche Mode's live show, as published in Record Mirror on 13 February 1982

Paul Colbert of Melody Maker felt that Depeche Mode speak with "a winning immediacy" and called the album "a wriggling giant of motivation, persuading each muscle to jump in time with the music", while at the same time criticising the presence of certain tracks such as "Nodisco" that "repeat earlier thoughts and feels without adding fresh views." Rob White, writing for the Christchurch Press, was less positive, calling the music on Speak & Spell "instant pop, instantly disposable, as precious as the gladwrapped swan on the... cover", remarking that the songs "would actually blow away in the wind... if it wasn't for their ability to chance upon melody hooks that drag you along without any real protest" and ultimately calling the album "tedious". The Village Voice's Robert Christgau dismissed the bulk of the album as "tuneful pap" that "crosses Meco (without the humble functionalism), Gary Numan (without the devotion to surface), and Kraftwerk (without the humor—oh, definitely without the humor)."

A review in the French Best was positive, saying "Electronic music is no longer the exclusive domain of Kraftwerk and their disciples. It's now a playground for young English musicians who, without necessarily being virtuosos, have understood how to use machines to create a new pop language. Depeche Mode is one of the most promising groups in this movement. ... What's striking about Speak & Spell is its freshness. There's no pretension, no intellectualism. Just the joy of making music and sharing it. ... It's the work of a young group with a bright future."

In a retrospective review for AllMusic, Ned Raggett described Speak & Spell as "at once both a conservative, functional pop record and a groundbreaking release", as well as "an undiluted joy". Nitsuh Abebe of Pitchfork said that the album endures "not as stylish futurism (not anymore) but as the happy noises of teenagers who believed it to be stylish futurism—and with a charming earnestness."

== Live performances ==
Songs from Speak & Spell have featured prominently in Depeche Mode's live shows over the decades: many were performed during the 1981 Speak & Spell tour as well as the 1982 A Broken Frame tour. "Just Can't Get Enough" became a signature track for the band and was performed on many of their tours, including as part of the encore during their 2023–2024 Memento Mori World Tour. "Boys Say Go!" was played as the final encore of the band's Black Celebration tour in 1986, and "Photographic" was played on the band's 1984 Some Great Reward tour and again in 2006 as part of the band's Touring the Angel tour. A live version of "Ice Machine" recorded in 1984 appeared as the B-side to 1985's double A-side single release of "Blasphemous Rumours / Somebody".

== Legacy ==
Speak & Spell had left Depeche Mode labeled as a teenybopper band by UK's press, and although they were taken more seriously in other parts of Europe (notably West Germany), their poor image and reputation as a teen band were issues the band worked the rest of the decade to overcome. The band themselves disliked some of the album; in 1990, Gore lamented parts of it, saying, "I regret all that sickly boy-next-door stuff of the early days." When interviewed by Simon Amstell for Channel 4's Popworld program in 2005, both Gore and Fletcher stated that the track "What's Your Name?" was their least favourite Depeche Mode song of all time, although Gore has also named "People Are People" and "It's Called a Heart" as his least favorite Depeche Mode songs in other interviews.

In January 2005, Speak & Spell was included as an "essential" album in Mojo magazine's "Depeche Mode + the Story of Electro-Pop" special edition.

In 2025, Radio X included the album in its list of "The 25 best indie debut albums of the 1980s".

The album was remastered and re-released with bonus tracks in 2006 as both a standard CD and a deluxe CD/SACD+DVD edition; in the UK the album was re-released on 3 April 2006 and in the United States, the album re-released on 2 June 2006.

== Track listing ==
=== Original UK and European LP (1981) and CD (1984) releases ===
All tracks are written by Vince Clarke, except where noted. All lead vocals by Dave Gahan, except where noted.

Side one
No.	Title	Length
1.	"New Life"	3:43
2.	"I Sometimes Wish I Was Dead"	2:16
3.	"Puppets"	3:55
4.	"Boys Say Go!"	3:03
5.	"Nodisco"	4:11
6.	"What's Your Name?"	2:41

Side two
No.	Title	Writer(s)	Lead vocals	Length
7.	"Photographic"			4:44
8.	"Tora! Tora! Tora!"	Martin Gore		4:34
9.	"Big Muff"	Gore	instrumental	4:20
10.	"Any Second Now (Voices)"		Gore	2:35
11.	"Just Can't Get Enough"			3:40
Total length:				39:42

Bonus tracks on 1988 CD re-release
No.	Title	Length
12.	"Dreaming of Me" (cold end version)	4:03
13.	"Ice Machine" (cold end version)	4:05
14.	"Shout!"	3:46
15.	"Any Second Now"	3:08
16.	"Just Can't Get Enough" (Schizo mix)	6:41
Total length:		61:25

=== Original US LP (1981) and CD (1987) releases ===
No.	Title	Length
1.	"New Life" (remix)	3:56
2.	"Puppets"	3:57
3.	"Dreaming of Me" (fade out version)	3:42
4.	"Boys Say Go!"	3:04
5.	"Nodisco"	4:13
6.	"What's Your Name?"	2:41
7.	"Photographic"	4:58
8.	"Tora! Tora! Tora!"	4:24
9.	"Big Muff"	4:21
10.	"Any Second Now (Voices)"	2:33
11.	"Just Can't Get Enough" (Schizo mix)	6:41
Total length:		44:30

=== 2006 Collectors Edition CD + DVD ===
- Disc one is a hybrid SACD/CD with a multi-channel SACD layer.
- Disc two is a DVD which includes Speak & Spell in DTS 5.1, Dolby Digital 5.1 and PCM Stereo plus bonus material.

Disc one (CD)
No.	Title	Length
1.	"New Life"	3:46
2.	"I Sometimes Wish I Was Dead"	2:18
3.	"Puppets"	3:56
4.	"Boys Say Go!"	3:08
5.	"Nodisco"	4:15
6.	"What's Your Name?"	2:45
7.	"Photographic"	4:43
8.	"Tora! Tora! Tora!"	4:38
9.	"Big Muff"	4:24
10.	"Any Second Now (Voices)"	2:35
11.	"Just Can't Get Enough"	3:44
12.	"Dreaming of Me" (cold end version)	4:03

Disc two (DVD): DTS 5.1, Dolby Digital 5.1, PCM Stereo
No.	Title	Length
1.	"Depeche Mode: 1980–81 (Do We Really Have to Give Up Our Day Jobs?)" (a short film)	28:24
2.	"New Life"	3:46
3.	"I Sometimes Wish I Was Dead"	2:18
4.	"Puppets"	3:56
5.	"Boys Say Go!"	3:08
6.	"Nodisco"	4:15
7.	"What's Your Name?"	2:45
8.	"Photographic"	4:43
9.	"Tora! Tora! Tora!"	4:38
10.	"Big Muff"	4:24
11.	"Any Second Now (Voices)"	2:35
12.	"Just Can't Get Enough"	3:44
13.	"Dreaming of Me" (cold end version)	4:03

Disc 2 (DVD) additional tracks: PCM Stereo
No.	Title	Length
14.	"Ice Machine" (cold end version)	4:05
15.	"Shout!"	3:46
16.	"Any Second Now"	3:08
17.	"Just Can't Get Enough" (Schizo mix)	6:44

== Personnel ==
Credits adapted from the liner notes of Speak & Spell.

- Depeche Mode – synthetics, voices, production
  - Vince Clarke
  - Andy Fletcher
  - Dave Gahan
  - Martin Gore
- Daniel Miller – production
- Eric Radcliffe – engineering
- John Fryer – engineering
- Brian Griffin – photography

== Charts ==
=== Weekly charts ===
1981–1982 weekly chart performance for Speak & Spell
Chart (1981–1982)	Peak position
Australian Albums (Kent Music Report)	28
German Albums (Offizielle Top 100)	49
New Zealand Albums (RMNZ)	45
Spanish Albums (AFYVE)	26
Swedish Albums (Sverigetopplistan)	21
UK Albums (Official Charts)	10
UK Independent Albums (MRIB)	1
US Billboard 200	192

2006 weekly chart performance for Speak & Spell
Chart (2006)	Peak position
Italian Albums (FIMI)	99

=== Year-end charts ===
Year-end chart performance for Speak & Spell
Chart (1982)	Position
UK Albums (BMRB)	77

== Certifications ==
Certifications for Speak & Spell
Region	Certification	Certified units/sales
Germany (BVMI)	Gold	250,000^{^}
Sweden (GLF)	Gold	50,000^{^}
United Kingdom (BPI)	Gold	100,000^{^}
^{^} Shipments figures based on certification alone.
