= He Said =

- Years active: 1985–1989
- Labels: Mute Records

He Said was the name used by Wire member Graham Lewis for his solo record releases in the 1980s.

== Background ==
The first He Said album titled Hail was released by Mute Records in October 1986. It was produced by Graham Lewis and John Fryer and recorded at Blackwing Studios in London. Collaborators on the album included fellow Wire member Bruce Gilbert and musician Brian Eno, who played a Yamaha DX7 synthesiser on the track I Fall into Your Arms. Two singles were released from the initial album, including Pump and Only One I. The CD release included the September single release, Pulling 3g's / Pale Feet.

In July 1988 Mute released the single Could You, again produced by Lewis and Fryer. This single was included on the last He Said album titled Take Care which was released by Mute the following year.

== Discography ==
=== Albums ===
- Hail (Mute Records 1986)
- Take Care (Mute Records 1989)

=== Singles ===
- Only One I (1985)
- Pump (1986)
- Pulling 3g's / Pale Feet (1986)
- Could you? (1988)
