= Fireside Favourites =

Studio album by Fad Gadget
- Released: 7 November 1980
- Recorded: June 1980
- Studio: Blackwing Studios (London)
- Genre: Post-punk, synthpop, minimal wave
- Length: 36:00
- Label: Mute
- Producer: Fad Gadget, Eric Radcliffe, John Fryer, Daniel Miller

Fad Gadget chronology
Fireside Favourites (1980)	Incontinent (1981)

Professional ratings
Review scores
Source	Rating
AllMusic	3/5 stars

Fireside Favourites is the debut studio album by Fad Gadget. It was released on 7 November 1980, through record label Mute.

== Background ==
The music developed the primitive industrial sound of his first recordings, the singles "Back to Nature" (1979) and "Ricky's Hand" (1980). Realised with an expanded array of collaborators, including a number of notable record producers, the album's instrumentation combined the synthesizers, drum machines and found objects of previous releases with conventional guitar, bass and percussion. The lyrics and subject matter ridiculed various aspects of modern society and featured observations from sometimes bizarre perspectives.

The opening track, "Pedestrian", was a commentary on society's obsession with the automobile. It segued into "State of the Nation", whose chorus declared that "Life begins when you're ready to face it". "Salt Lake City Sunday" satirized the Church of Jesus Christ of Latter-day Saints, from its practice of tithing ("They want you to repent/They want your ten per cent") to its belief in conversion of the deceased ("You leave my ancestors to rot in their graves"). "Coitus Interruptus" described the vacuousness of modern relationships ("The boys sleep with girls/The boys sleep with boys/Never find that high/Never acting coy") with deadpan puns ("Emission impossible"). The jaunty title track and then-current single, "Fireside Favourite", juxtaposed sexual conquest with nuclear nightmare imagery ("Hey now honey, open your eyes/There's a mushroom cloud up in the sky/Your hair is falling out and your teeth have gone/Your legs are still together but it won't be long").

"Newsreel" parodied all-pervading news reportage ("Put the mike into the mouth of the wound/Tape the sound of fading life/Edit out the sounds that displease/Ask the feelings of a dead man's wife"). "Insecticide", also released as the B-side of "Fireside Favourite", was narrated from a fly's point of view ("I creep up the wall/And then across the ceiling/I spin round the bulb/And land on a sandwich"). "The Box", a re-recording of the B-side of Fad Gadget's debut single "Back to Nature", concerned premature burial. The closing track, "Arch of the Aorta", was a largely instrumental piece with looped background voices depicting conversation between medical staff and a patient.

== Release ==
Fireside Favourites was released on 7 November 1980. It did not make the mainstream charts.

== Track listing ==
All tracks are written by Frank Tovey.

Side one
No.	Title	Length
1.	"Pedestrian"	3:20
2.	"State of the Nation"	3:48
3.	"Salt Lake City Sunday"	2:12
4.	"Coitus Interruptus"	4:39
5.	"Fireside Favourite"	4:31

Side two
No.	Title	Length
1.	"Newsreel"	3:42
2.	"Insecticide"	3:09
3.	"The Box"	4:19
4.	"Arch of the Aorta"	6:17

== Personnel ==
Credits adapted from LP liner notes.

- Fad Gadget – voice, synthesizer, tapes, drum machine, ashtray, metal chair, electric shaver, studio

Additional personnel

- Eric Radcliffe – guitar, bass guitar, banjo, studio
- John Fryer – extra fingers, ashtray, metal chair, studio
- Nick Cash – drums
- Daniel Miller – electronic percussion (1, 4), synthesizer, sequencer (4, 8), studio (8)
- Phil Wauquaire – bass synthesizer (1), bass guitar (6)

Technical

- David Penny – photography
- Simone Grant – design
