= One Man's Meat =

One Man's Meat may refer to:

- One man's meat is another man's poison, a proverb
- One Man's Meat, a 1942 book by E. B. White
- One Man's Meat, a 1977 detective novel by Colin Watson
- "One Man's Meat", a short story by Jeffrey Archer
- "One Man's Meat", a song by Fad Gadget from his 1984 album Gag
- "One Man's Meat", a song by Deep Purple from their 1993 album The Battle Rages On...
- "One Man's Meat", a television play by British comedian, Ronnie Barker under the pseudonym, Jack Goetz. Part of the Seven of One series.
- "One Man's Meat" (Doctors), a 2004 television episode
- "One Man's Meat" (A Touch of Frost), a 1999 television episode
- One Man's Meat, an album by Viggo Mortensen
