= Incontinent (album) =

Studio album by Fad Gadget
- Released: 9 November 1981
- Recorded: June–August 1981
- Studio: Blackwing Studios (London)
- Genre: New wave, electronic
- Length: 46:00
- Label: Mute - STUMM 6
- Producer: Fad Gadget, Eric Radcliffe, John Fryer

Fad Gadget chronology
| Fireside Favourites (1980) | Incontinent (1981) | Under the Flag (1982) |

Incontinent is the second album by Frank Tovey, better known as Fad Gadget, released in 1981. While developing the industrial sound of his debut Fireside Favourites in 1980, the new album relied less on drum machines and found objects, introducing more traditional instruments such as accordion and jaw harp, as well as making more frequent use of female backing vocals. The album's cover featured Tovey made up as the puppet Punch. Its lyrical content was informed by his tour of the US in 1980.

== Background ==
"Blind Eyes" satirised keeping the world's problems at arm's length, with lines such as "Send a few pounds to a charity / Now we're feeling so much better" and a chorus intoning "Hear no, see no, speak no evil". This was followed by "Swallow It", which foresaw the general public swallowing whatever mass-circulation newspapers put before them. "Saturday Night Special" took its title from an American revolver and ruminated on the right of men to bear arms and rule their home. It has been called a "baroque ditty for all gun lovers", and "a comment on the macho attitudes of Reagan's America". The title track and "Manual Dexterity", respectively the last track on Side 1 and the first track on Side 2 of the original vinyl LP, were the album's twin instrumentals. The former track featured Mute Records founder Daniel Miller, the latter Robert Gotobed of the band Wire.

A non-album single, "Make Room" backed with "Lady Shave", preceded Incontinent's release on 18 March 1981. "King of the Flies" was released as a flexi-single on 2 October 1981. "Saturday Night Special" backed with "Swallow It Live" (recorded at the Venue on 8 December 1981) was issued on 5 January 1982. A rerecorded version of "King of the Flies" backed with "Plain Clothes" was released on 6 April 1982. None of these singles, or the parent album, made the mainstream charts.

== Reception ==
Professional ratings
Review scores
| Source | Rating |
|---|---|
| AllMusic | 3/5 stars |

At the time of its release in November 1981, NME remarked on the album's "brooding nature... offset by female vocals and exultant piano". More recently Trouser Press described it as possessing "more instrumental variety and better production" than its predecessor Fireside Favourites, but added: "Forgetting tripe like "Swallow It" and the charming title tune, some of this is interesting enough, but none is really involving; overall, the self-indulgent album rambles incoherently".

== Track listing ==
Side one
| No. | Title | Writer(s) | Length |
|---|---|---|---|
| 1. | "Blind Eyes" | Frank Tovey, Peter Balmer | 5:04 |
| 2. | "Swallow It" | Tovey, Balmer, David Simmonds | 5:42 |
| 3. | "Saturday Night Special" | Tovey, Barbara Frost | 6:39 |
| 4. | "Incontinent" | Tovey | 3:27 |

Side two
| No. | Title | Writer(s) | Length |
|---|---|---|---|
| 1. | "Manual Dexterity" | Tovey, Robert Gotobed | 3:35 |
| 2. | "Innocent Bystander" | Tovey | 6:32 |
| 3. | "King of the Flies" | Tovey, Balmer, Nick Cash | 4:29 |
| 4. | "Diminished Responsibility" | Tovey, Balmer, Cash | 5:50 |
| 5. | "Plain Clothes" | Tovey | 4:40 |

== Personnel ==
- Fad Gadget – vocals, Chinese shawm, saxophone, flute, percussion, synthesizer, sequencer
- Nick Cash – drums (1–4, 6–9), percussion, steel drum, vocals, jew's harp, accordion
- Peter Balmer – bass guitar, rhythm guitar, vocals
- David Simmonds – piano, synthesizer, voice
- B.J. Frost – vocals
- Anne Clift – vocals
- Eric Radcliffe – guitar (6, 9)
- Robert Gotobed – drums (5)
- Daniel Miller – sequencer (4)
- John Fryer – percussion, voice
