= Dreaming of Me =

1981 single by Depeche Mode

Single by Depeche Mode

from the album Speak & Spell (1988 CD reissue)
- B-side: "Ice Machine"
- Released: 20 February 1981
- Recorded: December 1980
- Studio: Blackwing (London)
- Genre: Synth-pop
- Length: 4:03 (cold end version); 3:46 (fade out version)
- Label: Mute
- Songwriter: Vince Clarke
- Producers: Depeche Mode; Daniel Miller

Depeche Mode singles chronology
"Dreaming of Me" (1981)	"New Life" (1981)

Professional ratings
Review scores
Source	Rating
AllMusic	3/5 stars

"Dreaming of Me" is the debut single by English electronic music band Depeche Mode, taken from their debut album Speak & Spell. It was recorded in December 1980 at Blackwing Studios and originally released in February 1981 in the UK via Mute Records. It was not commercially released in the United States.

== Background and release ==
Depeche Mode joined Mute Records in late 1980/early 1981, and "Dreaming of Me" was the band's first official single, released on 20 February 1981 before the album Speak & Spell was recorded. Released only in Europe with catalogue number MUTE013 in the UK and INT 197.206 in Germany, early pressings of the UK single were distributed by Rough Trade Records and later pressings by Spartan Distributors. There was no 12" release of the original single.

"Dreaming of Me" reached number 57 on the UK charts, but did not appear on UK pressings of Speak & Spell, released in October 1981. The original UK release instead included the track "I Sometimes Wish I Was Dead"; international versions replaced that track with "Dreaming of Me".

The single's B-side, "Ice Machine", was one of three tracks the band originally put on a demo tape of theirs when they were shopping for a record label, before joining Mute.

In 2011, thirty years after the song's initial release, a fan-led campaign in Germany brought "Dreaming of Me" back onto their charts, where it peaked at number 45.

== Track listing ==
All tracks written by Vince Clarke

7″: Mute / 7Mute13 (UK)

1. "Dreaming of Me" (fade out version) – 3:46
2. "Ice Machine" (fade out version) – 3:54

12″: Mute / 12Mute13 (UK)

1. "Dreaming of Me" (fade out version) – 3:46
2. "Ice Machine" (fade out version) – 3:54
- Re-released in 2018 as a part of the Speak & Spell: The 12″ Singles box set

CD: Mute / Intercord Ton GmbH / CDMute13 / INT 811.868 (West Germany) – released in 1988

1. "Dreaming of Me" (cold end version) – 4:03
2. "Ice Machine" (cold end version) – 4:06

CD: Mute / CDMute13 (UK) – released in 1991

1. "Dreaming of Me" (fade out version) – 3:46
2. "Ice Machine" (fade out version) – 3:54

CD: Sire / 40289-2 (US) – released in 1991

1. "Dreaming of Me" (fade out version) – 3:46
2. "Ice Machine" (fade out version) – 3:54

== Charts ==
Weekly chart performance for "Dreaming of Me"
Chart (1981)	Peak position
UK Singles (Official Charts)	57
UK Indie (MRIB)	1
US Dance Club Songs (Billboard)	47

Chart (2011)	Peak position
Germany (GfK)	45
