= Snakedrill =

EP by Wire
- Released: November 1986
- Recorded: Summer 1986
- Studio: The Strong Room, London
- Genre: Post-punk; experimental rock; industrial rock
- Length: 15:53
- Label: Mute
- Producer: Daniel Miller; Gareth Jones

Wire chronology
Document and Eyewitness (1981)	Snakedrill (1986)	Ahead (1987)

Professional ratings
Review scores
Source	Rating
AllMusic	3/5 stars
Robert Christgau	B+

Snakedrill is an EP by English rock band Wire, released in November 1986 by Mute Records. It was the first release after the band's five-year hiatus (1980–1985), and foreshadows their extensive use of electronic instrumentation on following albums, particularly on "A Serious of Snakes", which contains multiple layered synth and keyboard parts.

The entire EP is now included in the form of bonus tracks on The Ideal Copy (1987).

== Content ==
"A Serious of Snakes" and "Advantage in Height" are slightly mainstream, avant-pop tracks, while the droning "Drill", which is based around a single chord, is described by Paul Lester in the book Lowdown: The Story of Wire as "far removed from the luscious musicality" of earlier songs like "Outdoor Miner" and "Map Ref. 41°N 93°W". Instead, "the delight," he wrote, "lay in the sonic layers and textures rather than any melodic twists and turns." The almost a cappella "Up to the Sun," sung as a duet by Graham Lewis and Colin Newman, is likened to a Gregorian chant by Lester. The track is described by AllMusic as a "pseudo-mystical incantation" and was allegedly written by Lewis in order to "cure" Newman, who had been suffering from hepatitis.

== Track listing ==
All tracks are written by Wire

1. "'A Serious of Snakes...'" – 4:53
2. "Drill" – 5:05
3. "Advantage in Height" – 3:05
4. "Up to the Sun" – 2:50

== Personnel ==
Adapted from the EP liner notes, except where noted.

Wire

- B.C. Gilbert
- Colin Newman
- Graham Lewis
- Robert Gotobed

Technical personnel

- Daniel Miller – producer, mixing
- Gareth Jones – producer, engineer, mixing
- David Buckland – cover photography
