= Eejit =

"Eejit" is an Irish and Scottish slang term derived from and meaning "idiot". It may also refer to:

- "Eejit", a song by Halou
- Eejits, a play by Ron Hutchinson
- Eejits, a type of mindless slave present in The House of the Scorpion
