= I Start Counting (band) =

British musical duo

- I Start Counting (Left: David Baker, Right: Simon Leonard)

Background information
- Also known as: Komputer, Fortran 5
- Origin: England
- Genres: Electronic, synth-pop
- Years active: 1984–1989
- Label: Mute
- Past members: David Baker; Simon Leonard

I Start Counting were an electronic music duo from North London. The band consisted of David Baker and Simon Leonard.

== Background ==
Baker and Leonard had met at Middlesex University; both had an affection for pop music. In 1982, they began to DJ together which led them to form the I Start Counting project. Leonard specialized in the technology side and Baker was biased toward the musical side of the project. They approached Daniel Miller with some demos of their recorded material. These demos led to Mute Records signing the duo in 1984.

Initially, they recorded two singles for Mute titled "Letters to a Friend" and "Still Smiling"; both singles were produced by Daniel Miller. Then in 1986, I Start Counting recorded their debut album titled My Translucent Hands. The album was produced by Paul Kendall. In 1987, they supported Erasure on their European tour.

The band's second album was released in June 1989, titled Fused. It included a new version of the track "Lose Him", made up of sampled voices instead of a recorded singer.

In 1990, they recorded some new material, but realized that it sounded quite different from their previous electropop recordings. This new style of dance/techno was released under the name Fortran 5; the band would later change their name again to cater for the Kraftwerk-influenced project known as Komputer.

== As Fortran 5 ==
Fortran 5

Background information
- Origin: England
- Genres: Electronic
- Years active: Early to mid-1990s
- Label: Mute
- Past members: David Baker; Simon Leonard

Around 1990, Baker and Leonard had begun recording new material, and realised that the new music had a different sound compared to their previous electropop style. They decided to rename their project Fortran 5 in order to give their new dance/techno style a fresh start. The new project also involved the duo collaborating and working with a number of other artists. These included Kris Weston of the Orb, and Rod Slater from Bonzo Dog Doo-Dah Band.

The band's final album was titled Avocado Suite and was their most experimental work; this was far removed from their early electropop sound.

Fortran 5 also remixed songs from artists such as Inspiral Carpets, Erasure and Laibach.

Simon Leonard also wrote a novella called Fortran 5, which was published by Malice Aforethought Press.

== As Komputer ==
Leonard and Baker reacted to the tedium of mid-1990s indie guitar music by returning to their Kraftwerk-inspired roots which again provoked a name change to Komputer. The band took samples from a variety of sources: from Russian cosmonauts to rubbish compactors and mobile phone ringtones.

Komputer's first releases, the Komputer EP from 1996, and the subsequent album The World of Tomorrow were a respectful homage to the duo's German electronic heroes (Orchestral Manoeuvres in the Dark used a sample from "Looking Down on London" for their track "The Right Side?"). Later material saw Komputer absorbing a much wider variety of influences and creating their own unique style of English electronic pop/folk music.

The duo never performed live as Fortran 5, but from the earliest days as Komputer, live shows were very important, leading to many performances all over Europe, most recently appearing at the Short Circuit presents Mute festival at London’s Roundhouse.

For Synthetik, the band's third album, the music gradually evolved over a long period of time, tracks were tried out in live sets then discarded or reworked in the studio, maturing into a return to the more traditional electro sound of the first album, The World of Tomorrow, with the incorporation of a more experimental and contemporary electronica approach.

== Discography ==
=== Albums ===
As I Start Counting

- 1986 - My Translucent Hands (Mute)
- 1989 - Fused (Mute)
- 1991 - Catalogue (compilation) (Mute, Elektra)
- 2021 - "Ejected" (Mute)

As Fortran 5

- 1991 - Blues (Mute)
- 1993 - Bad Head Park (Mute)
- 1995 - Avocado Suite (Mute)

=== Singles ===
As I Start Counting

- 1984 - "Letters to a Friend" (Mute)
- 1985 - "Still Smiling" (Mute)
- 1986 - "Catch That Look" (Mute)
- 1987 - "My Translucent Hands" (Mute)
- 1988 - "Lose Him" (Mute)
- 1988 - "Ra! Ra! Rawhide" (Mute)
- 1989 - "Million Headed Monster" (Mute)
