= Strategies Against Architecture IV =

Compilation album by Einstürzende Neubauten
- Released: 7 December 2010
- Recorded: 2002–2010
- Genre: Industrial; avant-garde
- Length: 133:20
- Label: Mute

Einstürzende Neubauten chronology
The Jewels (2008)	Strategies Against Architecture IV (2010)	Lament (2014)

Strategies Against Architecture IV (German: Strategien gegen Architektur IV) is a compilation album by Einstürzende Neubauten released on 7 December 2010. This album featured a retrospective overview of the band's work between 2002 and 2010. It is the fourth Einstürzende Neubauten release of in the Strategies Against Architecture series.

== Track listing ==
Disc one

1. "Perpetuum Mobile" (single version) - 4:31
2. "Selbstportrait Mit Kater" (full version) - 7:49
3. "Ein Leichtes Leises Säuseln" - 4:33
4. "Youme & Meyou" (live) - 5:31
5. "Dead Friends (Around The Corner)" (live) - 4:59
6. "Insomnia" - 7:28
7. "Party In Meck-Pomm" - 2:09
8. "X" - 4:08
9. "Floorpiece/Grundstück" - 4:27
10. "Good Morning Everybody" - 4:45
11. "Waiting For The Call" (live) - 3:57
12. "Wo Sind Meine Schuhe?" (dub version) - 6:06
13. "GS1 & GS2" - 6:35
14. "Palast Der Republik" (live) - 2:36

Disc two

1. "Sendezeichen Phase 3" - 1:03
2. "Tagelang Weiss" - 6:27
3. "Wenn Dann" - 3:11
4. "Jeder Satz Mit Ihr Hallt Nach" - 3:47
5. "Susej" - 4:47
6. "Magyar Energia" - 3:29
7. "Birth Lunch Death" - 3:22
8. "Weil Weil Weil (Freie Radikale In Der Warteschleife)" - 3:46
9. "Unvollständigkeit" (live) - 12:24
10. "Let's Do It A Dada" - 5:55
11. "Bertolt Brecht Und Der Weltempfängter" - 0:28
12. "Musterhaus-Ausstellung" - 15:07
  - I. "Anarchitektur"
  - II. "Et Cetera"
  - III. "Weingeister"
  - IV. "Tohu Wa Bohu"
