= Silicon Teens =

British new wave virtual band

- Origin: United Kingdom
- Genres: New wave; electronic
- Years active: 1979–1981
- Labels: Mute; Mercury; MCA
- Past members: Daniel Miller; Frank Tovey

Silicon Teens were a British new wave virtual band. The project was the creation of Mute Records founder Daniel Miller. Frank Tovey portrayed the band's fictional frontman.

== Background ==
The "group" were publicised as a quartet with members named Darryl, Jacki, Paul and Diane, but in reality these individuals did not exist and for media interviews their parts were played by actors, with the band's lead singer Darryl portrayed by musician Frank Tovey. Tovey did not perform on any Silicon Teens recordings; all vocals and instrumentation were actually provided by Daniel Miller. Miller also produced the recordings under the pseudonym "Larry Least", a play on the name of 1960s pop producer Mickie Most.

The project was launched in 1979 with the single "Memphis Tennessee", a cover of the Chuck Berry song. Two other singles followed; these were, along with other tracks, assembled into the 1980 album Music for Parties, a collection mostly comprising rock and roll standards from the 1950s and 1960s, played in an upbeat synthpop style. There were three original compositions on the album, one featuring a vocal ("TV Playtime") and two instrumentals ("Chip 'n' Roll", "State of Shock (Part 2)"). An additional original, "Sun Flight", appeared as a single B-side and was subsequently added to the CD reissue of the album. The video for the 1979 single "Memphis Tennessee" centres on the Sinking of the RMS Titanic.

The album and the singles "Judy in Disguise" and "Just Like Eddie" were top ten hits on the UK Indie Chart in 1980. The "group" ceased activity after 1980, but film director John Hughes was so taken with it that their rendition of "Red River Rock" (in a re-recorded version) can be heard in the film soundtrack of the Steve Martin and John Candy film Planes, Trains, and Automobiles. It was also issued as a single in 1988 in both the US and the UK.

The band's rendition of "You Really Got Me" was featured on a compilation album of new wave songs put out by French covers band Nouvelle Vague.

The group is the subject of a song called "Silicon Teens" by The Pulsars on their 1997 album, Pulsars.

== Discography ==
=== Albums ===
- Music for Parties (September 1980) – UK Indie No. 4

=== Singles ===
- "Memphis Tennessee" / "Let's Dance" (August 1979)
- "Judy in Disguise" / "Chip 'n' Roll" – UK Indie No. 4
- "Just Like Eddie" / "Sun Flight" – UK Indie No. 7
