= Strategies Against Architecture =

Strategies Against Architecture can refer to one of four album releases by Einstürzende Neubauten:

- Strategies Against Architecture '80–'83, spanning 1980 – 1983, released in 1984
- Strategies Against Architecture II, spanning 1984 – 1990, released in 1991
- Strategies Against Architecture III, spanning 1991 – 2001, released in 2001
- Strategies Against Architecture IV, spanning 2002 – 2010, released in 2010
