= Gag (album) =

Studio album by Fad Gadget
- Released: February 1, 1984
- Recorded: November 1983
- Studio: Hansa Tonstudio (Berlin)
- Genre: Synth-pop; experimental pop; industrial
- Label: Mute - Stumm 15
- Producer: Frank Tovey, Gareth Jones

Fad Gadget chronology
Under the Flag (1982)	Gag (1984)	The Best of Fad Gadget (2001)

Singles from Gag
- 1. "Collapsing New People" Released: 1984; 2. "One Man's Meat" Released: 1984

Gag is the fourth and final studio album released by Fad Gadget on 1 February 1984 on Mute Records. The album was produced by Gareth Jones, who is known for working with acts such as Depeche Mode and Erasure, both being fellow Mute artists. It would also be the last album released under the name Fad Gadget, due to Frank Tovey wishing to release under his real name.

The album features tracks that are a combination of electronica and industrial styles, and features the German band Einstürzende Neubauten on the second track, "Collapsing New People", which was also released as a single ("Einstürzende Neubauten" translates as "Collapsing new buildings - specifically, tower blocks".)

== Background ==
During the recording of Gag, the German industrial band Einstürzende Neubauten were recording for Some Bizzare Records at Hansa Tonstudio and had been the support act for Fad Gadget at a gig at The Loft in Berlin. Tovey liked their use of industrial equipment and found objects, something he had encouraged Nick Cash (his drummer and percussionist since his first album) to do. Tovey heard a large printing press nearby which had a distinctive rhythm and asked Gareth Jones, his co-producer/engineer, to record it.

The recording was looped and became the basis for "Collapsing New People." ("einstürzende neubauten" translates as "collapsing new buildings"). All these recordings were engineered by Gareth Jones and the sample used was stored on his Akai sampler with Cash drumming along and keeping the swing of the machine. Gadget then thought it would be good to ask Neubauten if they would add some of their percussion noise to the mix; however, Frank thought there was enough going on in the track and their contribution was used on the b-side "Spoil the Child" and on the 12-inch mix of the song. Neubauten's percussion was overdubbed over the already recorded backing tracks. The percussion tracks proved difficult to mix at the final stage, but Gadget was pleased with the final result. The track "Collapsing New People" was released as a single by Mute Records.

== Critical reception ==
Professional ratings
Review scores
Source	Rating
AllMusic	2/5 stars
Sounds	3¾/5

Jason Collins of AllMusic gave a mixed review of the album saying, "Gag is, by far, Tovey's poppiest album, although, naturally, there are plenty of surprises and a few shocks in store for the listener. Alongside plainer and relatively conventional pop fare like "Ideal World" (the album's rousing opener), "Sleep", "Stand Up", "Speak to Me", and "The Ring" are songs that remind you (sometimes brutally) that this is still a Fad Gadget record". He also compared Gag to Depeche Mode's third album, Construction Time Again (1983), concluding that "Gag is a pop record like no other, but Tovey's relentlessly obsessive lyrical concerns alongside some fairly pedestrian instrumentation and hollow-sounding production renders his transformation into a pop performer something less than a success."

== Track listing ==
Side one
No.	Title	Writer(s)	Length
1.	"Ideal World"	Frank Tovey, Barbara Frost, Nick Cash	5:39
2.	"Collapsing New People"	Tovey, Frost, David Simmonds, Cash, David Rogers	4:22
3.	"Sleep"	Tovey, Daniel Miller	3:25
4.	"Stand Up"	Tovey, Simmonds, Rogers	3:30
5.	"Speak to Me"	Tovey, Joni Sackett	3:23

Side two
No.	Title	Writer(s)	Length
1.	"One Man's Meat"	Tovey, Sackett, Simmonds	4:06
2.	"The Ring"	Tovey, Simmonds	3:53
3.	"Jump"	Tovey, Sackett, Cash, Rogers	4:09
4.	"Ad Nauseam"	Tovey	6:32

== Personnel ==
Credits adapted from LP liner notes.

- Frank Tovey – voice
- David Simmonds – piano, synthesizer, organ, celeste, tuned bottles, marimba
- Nicholas Cash – drums, percussion
- David Rogers – guitar, double bass, bass synth
- Joni Sackett – voice, viola
- Barbara Frost – voice
- Morgan Tovey-Frost – voice (3)
- Rowland S. Howard – guitar (1, 9)

Technical

- Frank Tovey – producer
- Gareth Jones – producer
- Daniel Miller – producer (2)
- John Fryer – overdub engineer
- Anton Corbijn – photography

The overdubs on "Ideal World" and "Ad Nauseam" recorded at Blackwing Studios, London
