= Stripmall Architecture =

American musical group

- Origin: San Francisco, California, U.S.
- Genres: Dream pop
- Years active: 2008–present
- Members: Rebecca Coseboom; Ryan Coseboom

Stripmall Architecture is an American dream pop group. It was formed when Ryan and Rebecca Coseboom's previous band, Halou, dissolved. The expanded band includes Tim Hingston (guitar), Patrick Harte (drums), Erica 'Unwoman' Mulkey (cello), and other supporting musicians for their live shows and recording sessions.

The band used the service Kickstarter to generate funds to produce their new LP, Feathersongs For Factory Girls. Part one was released in April 2010, and part two followed a year later in 2011. Both parts were released together on a limited numbered edition double 10" LP on white vinyl in early 2011.

The band was interviewed on Seattle's KEXP 90.3 radio station on 12/09/09, performing several tracks live in studio. They also covered LCD Soundsystem's song "Drunk Girls".

Rebecca is also the singer for producer John Fryer's newest project, DarkDriveClinic.

== Discography ==
=== Albums ===
- We Were Flying Kites (2009)
- Feathersongs for Factory Girls (part one) (2010)
- Feathersongs for Factory Girls (part two) (2011)
- Suburban Reverb (2013)

=== EPs/compilations ===
- Object 01 (2008)
- Object 02 (2009)
- Object 03 (2009)
- Pripyat & the Halcyon Versions (2010)
- Albino Peacock (2011)
