= Grand Union (Frank Tovey album) =

Studio album by Frank Tovey
- Released: 13 May 1991
- Recorded: 1991
- Genre: Folk rock, rock
- Label: Mute Records
- Producer: Various

Frank Tovey chronology
Tyranny & the Hired Hand (1989)	Grand Union (1991)	Worried Men in Second Hand Suits (1992)

Singles from Grand Union
- 1. The Liberty Tree

Grand Union is the seventh studio album released by Frank Tovey, the third under his real name, and was released on 13 May 1991. It is the first album to feature Irish band The Pyros, which Frank would work with on the following album Worried Men in Second Hand Suits. The album was recorded at Sawmills Studio in Cornwall and at WW1, Harrow Road, London.

== Background ==
Grand Union was written by Frank Tovey as an autobiographical album based on a set of coincidences that happened within his life. Frank described the album as a ‘metaphoric vehicle’. He found that people and places involved in his music were located around the Grand Union Canal in London; including Mute Records, whose premises back on to the Grand Union Canal in the Harrow Road.

All the songs were written by Frank on acoustic guitar becoming rockier when recorded with additional bass and drums. Pressure was taken off of Frank through working with other musicians. Frank would turn up at rehearsals with an acoustic guitar and completed songs. The other musicians would then just join in; Frank never had to tell them what to play. He found this way of working really refreshing.

At the time Frank had begun working with the Pyros. The band, originally from Ireland, had moved to London and began working with Frank after meeting up at Hermes Point (near the Harrow Road), where the Pyros were living at the time. They would sit down and play some songs from Frank's previous album, Tyranny and the Hired Hand. After getting on well they worked with Frank for the next couple of years. This led to the creation of what became Frank Tovey and the Pyros, the name Frank would use on both Grand Union and his last studio album Worried Men in Second Hand Suits.

All the time they worked with Frank, the Pyros had begun to sound more electronic while Frank became more folk oriented in style. Acoustic instruments were used to form the basis of the songs, with some traditional Irish elements used to serve the whole recording. Frank had many ideas for the way he wanted the album to sound, one being the building of a solid body, electric five-string banjo for the recording of the album. This mix of influence formed the production, sound and style of the album.

=== Song meanings ===
The songs included stories and ideas based on the name sake area. the Grand Union canal including "Bad Day in Bow Creek" which runs adjacent to the River Thames; and "Passing Through" about the building of a motorway through an area where Frank lived whilst growing up. "Bethnal Green Tube Disaster" tells of his mother's story during the Blitz of London where her father had taken her to the underground station to shelter from the bombing. In the blackout one of her shoes fell off and while searching for it they avoided a terrible event that occurred that night. The panic-stricken crowd who were rushing underground tumbled on the stairs and many people were crushed to death. Frank lived in Bethnal Green until he was five years of age. "IKB (RIP)" tells the story of Isambard Kingdom Brunel's death. Brunel is buried at Kensal Green next to the Grand Union canal.

The main single released from the album was "The Liberty Tree". The video of "The Liberty Tree" was filmed at Mudchute Farm on the Isle of Dogs. This is the same location where the cover artwork was shot of Frank riding a horse in front of Canary Wharf. The video was directed by Frank Tovey and Derrek Santini.

"The Liberty Tree" throws up a couple odd coincidences. The history of The Liberty tree comes from America. The British made the Liberty Tree an object of ridicule. Soldiers tarred and feathered a man named Ditson, and forced him to march in front of the tree. Americans would hang British officers in effigy form from the tree. Frank often appeared tarred and feathered (Gag album cover) and also wrote and sang many lyrics about hanging ("Sam Hall") just a coincidence, I am sure.

== Track listing ==
All tracks are written by Frank Tovey.

No.	Title	Length
1.	"Bad Day In Bow Creek"	5:17
2.	"When the Victim Takes the Tyrant's Place"	3:43
3.	"Passing Through"	4:49
4.	"Bethnal Green Tube Disaster"	4:54
5.	"Cities Of The Plain"	6:35
6.	"Fallen Angel"	2:32
7.	"IKB (RIP)"	7:32
8.	"The Liberty Tree"	4:52
9.	"One November Morning"	6:20
10.	"The Great Attractor"	5:00
Total length:		51:36

== Personnel ==
- Frank Tovey – vocals, acoustic guitar

The Pyros

- Paul Rodden – solid body 5-string electric banjo, 5-string acoustic banjo, acoustic guitar
- John Cutliffe – 5-string electric bass, acoustic guitar; strings on "The Great Attractor"

with:

- Charlie Llewellin – drums, percussion and harmonium
- Steve Smith – organ, harmonium, piano, engineer
- Tracey Booth – Bodhrán on "I.K.B. (R.I.P.)
- Elliot Carnegie – Jew's harp on "Bad Day in Bow Creek"
- Tozie Lynch – bones on "Bad Day in Bow Creek"
