= Robert Rental =

Scottish electronic musician (1952–2000)

Background information
- Born: Robert Donnachie; 1952
- Died: 2000 (aged 47–48)
- Genres: Industrial, avant-garde, post-punk
- Instrument: Synthesizer
- Labels: Industrial, Mute

Robert Donnachie (1952–2000), known under the stage name of Robert Rental, was a Scottish pioneer of the post-punk DIY industrial electronic music scene in the United Kingdom.

== Biography ==
Originally from Port Glasgow, Scotland, he moved to the south of England with Thomas Leer in the late 1970s, and became involved with the local music scene. Robert Rental however released very little of his solo music, preferring to collaborate with Leer, as well as with Daniel Miller (as the Normal). The only commercially-released solo recording from the 1970s is the 7-inch single "Paralysis" first released on the homemade Regular Records, then re-released on Company Records in 1978. "Paralysis" was recorded at home on a 4-track Tascam tape recorder which he hired in collaboration with Leer. The single features the distorted sound of a Stylophone.

Another distinctive sound that Rental used was that of the EDP Wasp Synthesizer, which he introduced to Chris Carter of Throbbing Gristle and William Bennett of Whitehouse. He also made an acclaimed album with Thomas Leer called The Bridge which was released on Throbbing Gristle's Industrial Records. The album reached number 9 on the Independent Chart in 1980. His other two official releases were the 1980 single "Double Heart/On Location", released on Daniel Miller's Mute Records, and Live at the West Runton Pavilion, recorded with Miller in 1979, and released via Rough Trade in 1980. Robert Rental toured with Daniel Miller as the Normal, supporting Stiff Little Fingers. Miller had met Rental through a Throbbing Gristle concert.

Robert Rental died of lung cancer in 2000.

== Discography ==
=== Albums ===
- Mental Detentions (limited demo album, with Thomas Leer on unspecified tracks) (1979), independent release (rereleased 2022 on Klanggalerie)
- Thomas Leer & Robert Rental – The Bridge (1979), Industrial Records
- Robert Rental & the Normal – Live at West Runton Pavilion, 6-3-79 (1980), Rough Trade
- Robert Rental & Glenn Wallis – untitled LP (2017), Dark Entries
- Robert Rental – "Different Voices for You. Different Colours for Me. Demos 1980" (2018), Optimo Music

=== Singles ===
- "Paralysis" (1978), Regular Records
- "Paralysis" (1978), Company Records
- "Double Heart" / "On Location" (1980), Mute Records
- Thomas Leer / Robert Rental – "Splash Momentum / The Waltz of the Fatman" (2018), Electronic Sound
