= Warm Leatherette =

1978 single by the Normal

Single by the Normal
- A-side: "T.V.O.D."
- Released: November 1978
- Genre: Industrial; synth-pop
- Length: 6:15
- Label: Mute
- Songwriter: Daniel Miller
- Producer: Daniel Miller

"Warm Leatherette" is a song by Daniel Miller's project the Normal, released in 1978. Grace Jones recorded a well-known cover of the song in 1980.

== The Normal original ==
=== Overview ===
The lyrics of "Warm Leatherette" reference J. G. Ballard's controversial 1973 novel Crash, which had heavily influenced Daniel Miller. Together with his college friend he had worked on a film script based on the book, but after the project was abandoned Miller decided to "write a song encapsulating [the script] in 2 and a half minutes". The song was recorded in Miller's apartment using two Revox B-77 tape machines. A series of sawtooth waves were recorded on a Korg 700S synthesizer.

Miller took the record to a few independent music shops, including Rough Trade in London, where it would be played to customers. "Warm Leatherette" was released as the B-side to "T.V.O.D.", the only single by Miller's musical project the Normal, and the very first release on his Mute Records label. However, since it was "Warm Leatherette" that gained more public attention, it was featured as the lead song on subsequent single re-releases. Although Miller did not expect the single to be successful, it sold 30,000 copies.

=== Legacy ===
The single was an early example of industrial and synth-pop music, emerging on a wave of numerous electronic pop experiments of the late 1970s in the UK. It has since been described as having "revolutionised electronic music with its punk aesthetic, stark sound and dark subject matter" "Warm Leatherette" is considered to be a seminal track that influenced the emerging synth-pop of the 1980s and has been covered by numerous artists, including Grace Jones and Duran Duran, who performed it on a 2007 tour, and Trent Reznor and Atticus Ross in 2006. OMD frontman Andy McCluskey praised the track, saying it inspired him to share his band's electronic compositions publicly: "I first heard this slab of uncompromising electro brutalism in Eric's Club in the summer of 1978. An aggressive alien manifesto fired out into a dark sub basement shook me to the core. Someone in England had heeded Kraftwerk's call and taken it further than just a hidden homage in a Merseyside back room. Now was the time for [bandmate] Paul Humphreys and I to play live."

The song is featured in the 2020 American horror film Antebellum.

=== Track listing ===
- 7-inch single

A. "T.V.O.D." – 2:51
B. "Warm Leatherette" – 3:20

- CD single

A. "Warm Leatherette" – 3:24
B. "T.V.O.D." – 2:52

== Grace Jones version ==
"Warm Leatherette"

Single by Grace Jones

from the album Warm Leatherette
- Released: 1980
- Length: 4:25
- Label: Island
- Songwriter: Daniel Miller
- Producers: Chris Blackwell; Alex Sadkin

Grace Jones singles chronology
"Breakdown" (1980)	"Warm Leatherette" (1980)	"The Hunter Gets Captured by the Game" (1980)

Grace Jones recorded "Warm Leatherette" for her 1980 album of the same name. The song was released as a promotional 12-inch single. In 1981, it served as the opening song of her A One Man Show tour.

=== Track listing ===
- 12-inch single

A1. "Warm Leatherette" – 4:25
A2. "Love Is the Drug" – 7:15
B1. "The Hunter Gets Captured by the Game" – 3:50
B2. "Bullshit" – 5:20

=== Chart performance ===
Chart	Peak position
United States (Dance Music/Club Play)	20
