= Wolfgang Buchleitner =

German inventor

Wolfgang Buchleitner (known as "Wolf" Buchleitner, born Wolfgang Schwarz) (b. June 25, 1954) is a multifaceted German artist, equipment designer and inventor. Buchleitner is the head and catalyst of the Quantec ProAudio enterprise.

== Personal life ==
Buchleitner was born in Stuttgart, Baden-Württemberg, Germany and spent his childhood in Bad Wildbad in the secluded northern Black Forest. This played a certain role in his development, because in a place with hardly any neighbourhood children to play with, you have to find some other way to occupy yourself. He attended the Gymnasium in Neuenbürg and the Goetheschule Freie Waldorfschule in Pforzheim.

He is married and has a son Frederik and lives in Munich, Bavaria.

== Professional career ==
Buchleitner developed his own digital reverb algorithm. Without any college education, he surprised the audio community in 1982 with the Quantec QRS "Room Simulator", a digital reverberator he designed and built by himself, considered to be among the all-time favourites in this field and a legend for years. Units were still produced as late as 1995. Its fame and reputation remain undiminished after 25 years.

In 1982 he founded Quantec ProAudio (not to be confused with Quantec bicycle parts) in Munich.

Since 1992, he has been working on the planning of the Quancor device series, which ensures that all digital devices in a broadcasting or recording studio are perfectly synchronized with each other for reliable interoperation. During this time, 2 patents have been registered on this subject.

== Music ==
Buchleitner played piano since the age of 10 and at age 14 he joined his first rock band – as a keyboard player. He was also a member of the German folk rock band Scheytholtz. He also took part in numerous multimedia projects, among all together with Dietrich Lohff and Dieter Mack.

Quantec equipment is used several hundred times throughout the world by radio and TV broadcasters, recording, dubbing and film studios, music venues and theatres as well as many famous rock and pop musicians of international standing.

== Reference Links ==
- International Homepage Quantec ProAudio
