= Ricky's Hand =

Single by Fad Gadget
- Released: 14 March 1980
- Recorded: Blackwing Studios, London, 19 January 1980
- Genre: Synth-pop; industrial; electronic
- Length: 4:06
- Label: Mute Records
- Songwriter(s): Fad Gadget, Daniel Miller
- Producer(s): Fad Gadget, Daniel Miller

Fad Gadget singles chronology
"Back to Nature" (1979)	"Ricky's Hand" (1980)	"Fireside Favourite" (1980)

"Ricky's Hand" is a song by Fad Gadget, released as a single in 1980. It was the second Fad Gadget single, following "Back to Nature" the previous year. The track was not included on any studio album, predating a debut LP by several months, but does appear on several compilations. Mute Records founder Daniel Miller collaborated on the writing, playing and production.

Lyrically the song was a sardonic cautionary tale on the perils of drink driving: "From the pocket it pulled five pound / Ricky bought another round… Ricky contravened the highway code / The hand lies severed at the side of the road". The cover of the original vinyl single showed the hand in question being burnt by drops of beer in the fashion of a corrosive warning symbol.

The music was in a predominantly industrial style with an insistent electronic beat. A plaintive motif opened the track and recurred during the chorus, occasionally augmented by a distinctive 'choir girl effect', as it was described in the credits. An electric drill was also listed among the instruments; it can heard on the recording punctuating each mention of the song's title.

The B-side, "Handshake", was an instrumental that essentially mixed up the sounds used on the A-side. The blackly comical double meaning of its title was made evident by a cartoon strip on the single's rear sleeve depicting a blender being filled with milk, a man inserting his hand into the blender, and the device being switched on – with bloody results.

The single did not make the UK charts when released but was featured on some contemporary compilations such as Machines (1980). "Ricky's Hand" also appears on the CD compilations The Fad Gadget Singles (1992) and The Best of Fad Gadget (2001). Fad Gadget performed the song on the Belgian RTBF show Cargo De Nuit in 1980 with his two live musicians at the time, Phil Wauquaire and Jean-Marc Lederman.

The song was covered by industrial metal band Ministry on their 2024 album Hopiumforthemasses.

== Track listing ==
1. "Ricky's Hand" – 4:06
2. "Handshake" – 4:47

== Personnel ==
- Fad Gadget – synthesizer, vocals, tapes, Black & Decker V8 double speed electric drill
- Daniel Miller – synthesizer
- B.J. Frost – choir girl effect
