= Halou =

San Francisco based band

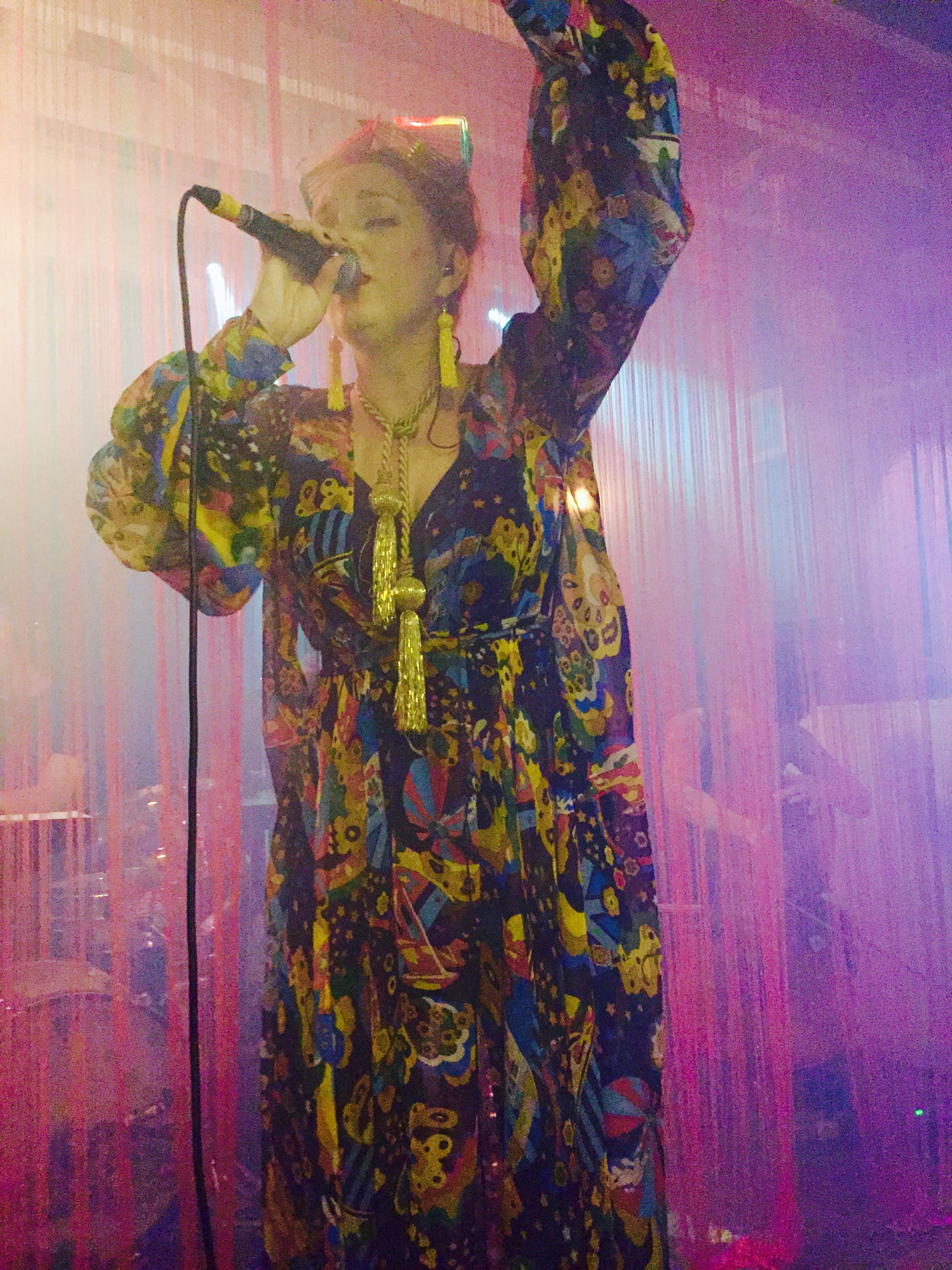
- Halou performing at The DNA Lounge San Francisco, 12 June 2015

Background information
- Origin: San Francisco, California
- Genres: Trip hop, dream pop, breakbeat
- Years active: 1997–2008; 2015–present
- Labels: Vertebrae, Nettwerk
- Members: Rebecca Coseboom - Vocals; Ryan Coseboom - Guitar; Andrei Pasternak - Bass; Erica Mulkey - Rhodes & Backing Vocals; Sergey Ledovsky - Drums
- Past members: Count (Mikael Eldrige)

Halou is a dream pop band from San Francisco, California. Originally formed in 1997 by couple Rebecca and Ryan Coseboom, the band was officially dissolved in 2008 before breaking their 11 year hiatus with the release of their album Brutalism For Lovers (2019).

== History ==
Ryan and Rebecca met in 1992 as the drummer and vocalist for the Santa Cruz-based band Anomie. Anomie's shoegaze sound met with rapid success in Santa Cruz on the strength of their album Burgundy Girl. The band later moved to San Francisco before the group split into two bands. In late 1995 Ryan and Rebecca's half formed "anymore" (as in: "We're not Anomie anymore.") and released two CDs.

After "anymore" dissolved, they became Halou. Ryan has cited influences including OMD, Wire and the Tom Tom Club. The band released their debut album, We Only Love You in 1998, on a small, independent label called Bedazzled. We Only Love You was followed by a compilation of non-album tracks entitled Sans Soucie in 1999. Their second album, Wiser, was released by Nettwerk in 2001, while the more recent, Wholeness & Separation and Halou, were released by Vertebrae in 2006 and 2008 respectively.

Halou's first album was broadcast on influential independent radio stations in Seattle and Los Angeles. In recent years, the band has received coverage from notable news sources, and they have been recognized for their production talents:

"Halou's remix of Rod Stewart's "Da Ya Think I'm Sexy" hit number one on the Billboard club chart, and they have been solicited for soundtrack work, already appearing on two feature films."

In 2008, Halou announced that they would no longer be making music under the moniker, and the three part collaboration was over. Rebecca and Ryan Coseboom continue to perform together under the name Stripmall Architecture. In late 2015, Halou went back into the studio to record, releasing the track Stillbreathing on November 2, 2015.

== Discography ==
=== Albums ===
- We Only Love You (1998)
- Wiser (2001)
- Wholeness and Separation (2006)
- Halou (2008)
- Brutalism For Lovers (2019)
- Albatross (2020)

=== EPs/compilations ===
- Wholeness EP (2003)
- Sans Soucie EP (2004)
- Albatross EP (2007)
- Sawtooth EP (2008)
- Welcome Stranger EP (2021)
- The Butcher's Bill EP (2024)
