= Under the Flag =

Studio album by Fad Gadget
- Released: September 1, 1982
- Recorded: 1982
- Studio: Blackwing Studios (London)
- Genre: New wave, electronic
- Length: 41:19
- Label: Mute - Stumm 8
- Producer: Frank Tovey, John Fryer

Fad Gadget chronology
Incontinent (1981)	Under the Flag (1982)	Gag (1984)

Professional ratings
Review scores
Source	Rating
Allmusic	4/5 stars

Under the Flag is the third studio album released on September 1 1982, by experimental electronic artist Fad Gadget. It was recorded at Blackwing Studios, All Hallows Church, London. The album was produced by Fad Gadget and John Fryer.

Written by Frank Tovey for the most part concerning his fear for the future of the world, in light of having just become a father. He was apparently afraid of the world his daughter was going to grow up in. Sampling, which was new technology back in the early 1980s is incorporated into the album and sequencing is also heavily used. It features backing vocals by fellow Mute Records artist Alison Moyet, known for working on, at the time Yazoo with Vince Clarke.

The naming of the album was the subject of a brief legal dispute with Under The Flag, an unsigned electro progressive group using the same name at the time. As reported in Smash Hits, the band yielded and renamed themselves The Archive.

"Scapegoat" features a Dutch nursery rhyme. Some of the ideas on this album were heavily inspired by German band Die Krupps and this is borne out by Fad Gadget's later album Gag which features Einstürzende Neubauten, who worked closely with Die Krupps.

== Tracklist ==
All tracks are written by Frank Tovey, except "Under the Flag I" and "Under the Flag II," written by Frank Tovey and John Fryer.

Side one
No.	Title	Length
1.	"Under the Flag I"	3:05
2.	"Scapegoat"	2:50
3.	"Love Parasite"	5:25
4.	"Plainsong"	3:51
5.	"Wheels of Fortune"	4:54

Side two
No.	Title	Length
1.	"Life on the Line IV"	3:53
2.	"The Sheep Look Up"	3:37
3.	"Cipher"	5:38
4.	"For Whom the Bells Toll"	5:13
5.	"Under the Flag II"	2:53

== Personnel ==
Credits adapted from LP liner notes.

- Frank Tovey – lead vocal, computer, synthesizer
- David Simmonds – grand piano, synthesizer
- Nicholas Cash – vibraphone, timpani, hand-held percussion
- Alison Moyet – saxophone (5)
- Patricia Bakker – Dutch nursery rhyme (2)

Chorus

- Alison Moyet
- Barbara Frost
- Jill Tipping
- Yvette Anna
- Andrew Kay
- Anne Clift
- John Fryer
