= Blackwing Studios =

Former recording studio in London, England

Coordinates: 51.503221°N 0.097817°W

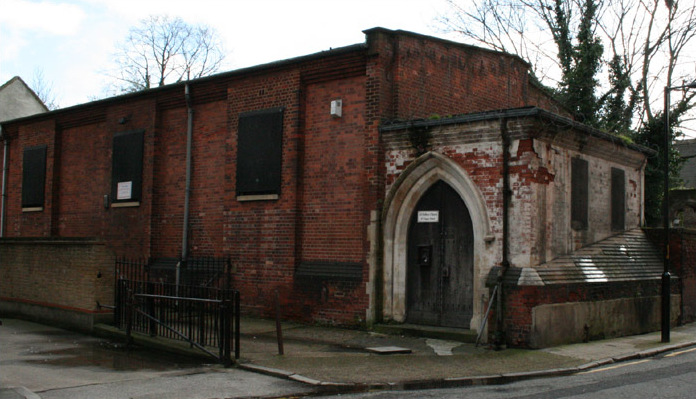
The site of Blackwing Studios in February 2010

Blackwing Studios was an English recording studio in south-east London most notable for early 1980s recording by Depeche Mode and Yazoo.

== Background ==
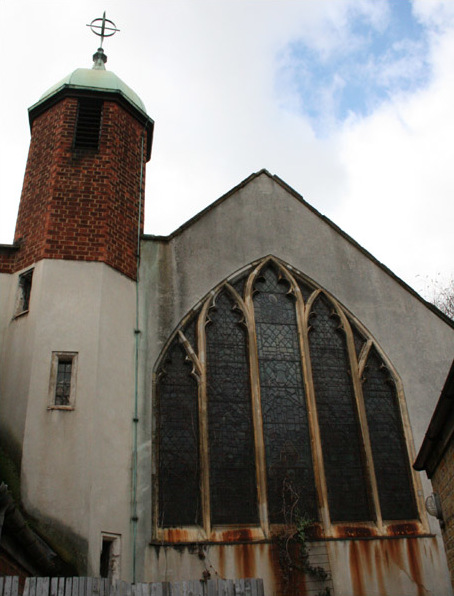
The site of Blackwing Studios in February 2010

The Blackwing Studios complex was housed inside a deconsecrated church in south-east London. All Hallows church was partly destroyed during The Blitz in 1941. After the war, Southwark Cathedral retained the north aisle and carried on using it as a temporary church. The destroyed south aisle was later turned into gardens and maintained by local residents from 1968.

Blackwing Studios was started by Eric Radcliffe, who worked on most of the early Mute Records recordings alongside Daniel Miller. Miller had discovered Blackwing when recording the Silicon Teens album. He required a studio with a big control room where he could set up all his synthesisers. Daniel Miller carried on using Blackwing to record other Mute Records artists. At the rear of the church building was a bell tower that was used for storing master tapes.

The first Depeche Mode album, Speak & Spell, was recorded at Blackwing using a TEAC eight-track recorder. The album was engineered by John Fryer. Yazoo named one of their albums, Upstairs at Eric's, after the studio, due to the main Blackwing studio being above Splendid Studios. When Vince Clarke initially came to Blackwing to record with Yazoo, he found that the studio was fully booked; Depeche Mode were recording their new album. He had the choice of recording at 4am during studio downtime or building another studio, which is how Splendid Studios came about. It was a not-for-hire studio below Blackwing.

After the break-up of Yazoo, Clarke decided he wanted to remain in the music industry. His initial enterprise after Yazoo was the formation of his own record label called Reset Records, a joint effort with Radcliffe, to sign and produce new acts recorded in Splendid Studios. The recordings were then licensed to RCA Records for release.

Blackwing Studios closed down in September 2001 and the building has been empty ever since, but the church building and gardens are still there. Proposals to demolish and replace the building were rejected by Southwark Council in 2007 but, as at 2026, Southwark Cathedral remain committed to giving the Church a new role within the community.

== Studio equipment ==
When Eric Radcliffe opened Blackwing, he initially used an eight-track TEAC for recording artists; this was later replaced by a 16-track machine. A second recorder was acquired and locked together with the initial machine, giving Blackwing 32 tracks of recording. This system was used for many early recordings by Yazoo and Depeche Mode. The system was eventually rationalised when two 24-track machines were purchased: one for Blackwing and one for Splendid Studios downstairs. Blackwing used an Amek 2500 mixing desk modified to work with electronic instruments. All the equipment at Blackwing and Splendid Studios was designed to be patchable through patch bays; none of the effects units were hardwired. Clarke installed a Fairlight CMI into Blackwing, which he had bought before the Yazoo tour, and used it on tracks such as "Never Never" by The Assembly.

Due to the low bandwidth that the Fairlight produced, Clarke began using the Synclavier, which used FM synthesis. This led, in 1984, to Clarke’s purchase of a Yamaha DX7 which was replaced by a Yamaha DX1 shortly afterwards because of better editability; he also updated the sound cards in the Fairlight to create a fuller sound. The Fairlight was used to sample sounds of Clarke smashing all sorts of wood, china and glass that were found when demolishing the lower part of the church to build Splendid Studios. Blackwing used a range of quality reverberation, including an AMS RMX, Lexicon 224 and 224X and a Quantec Room Simulator. Recordings at Blackwing also used natural reverb from a long corridor that still retained the stonework from the original war-damaged church. Above the studio was a natural echo chamber that lay under the church roof. Radcliffe left the echo chamber when designing the studios, as it seemed a waste removing it.

== Depeche Mode ==
One of the first tracks Depeche Mode recorded at Blackwing was "Dreaming of Me", after being decided it would be the band's first single. At the time, Clarke was unemployed, so he spent most of the daytime in the studio with Daniel Miller, who would advise Clarke on how to get sounds, use studio technology and arrange songs. Later in the afternoon, Martin Gore and Andy Fletcher would arrive from their day jobs to record melody parts. After the recording of Speak & Spell, Clarke left the band but carried on recording at Blackwing. In late 1981, Depeche Mode returned to Blackwing and recorded the single "See You", the first Depeche Mode track to use a Roland MC-4 sequencer, which made the core sound to the track. It was also the first Depeche Mode track recorded without Clarke.

== Notable recordings at Blackwing ==
- Silicon Teens — Music for Parties (Mute Records) 1980
- Fad Gadget — Fireside Favourites (Mute Records) 1980
- Depeche Mode — Speak & Spell (Mute Records) 1981
- Fad Gadget — Incontinent (Mute Records) 1981
- Boyd Rice & Frank Tovey — Easy Listening for the Hard of Hearing (Mute Records) Recorded 1981
- Duet Emmo — Or So It Seems (Mute Records) Recorded 1981 / 1982
- Yazoo — Upstairs at Eric's (Mute Records) 1982
- Depeche Mode — A Broken Frame (Mute Records) 1982
- Fad Gadget — Under the Flag (Mute Records) 1982
- Cocteau Twins — Garlands (4AD) 1982
- Yazoo — You and Me Both (Mute Records) 1983
- Dead Can Dance — Dead Can Dance (4AD) 1984
- Clan of Xymox — Medusa (4AD) 1986
- Lonely Is an Eyesore (4AD) 1987
- Love & Rockets — Love and Rockets 1988
- Nine Inch Nails — Pretty Hate Machine (TVT Records) 1989
- Ride — Nowhere (Creation Records) 1990
- Easy - Magic Seed (Blast First) 1990
- My Bloody Valentine — Loveless (Creation Records) 1991
- Pixies — Trompe le Monde (4AD) 1991
- The God Machine — Scenes from the Second Storey (Fiction Records) 1991
- Stereolab — Peng! (Too Pure) 1992
- Stereolab — Transient Random-Noise Bursts with Announcements (Elektra Records/Duophonic Records) 1993
- Stereolab — Mars Audiac Quintet (Elektra Records/Duophonic Records) 1994
- Stereolab — Emperor Tomato Ketchup (Elektra Records/Duophonic Records) 1996
- Django Bates — Quiet Nights (Screwgun Records) 1998
- The Mutton Birds — Rain, Steam and Speed (Shhhh Records) 1998
- Stereolab — Cobra and Phases Group Play Voltage in the Milky Night (Elektra Records/Duophonic Records) 1999
- Pool — Popgun (Little Red Fox) 2000
