= Just Like Eddie =

Single by Heinz
- B-side: "Don't You Knock On My Door"
- Released: July 1963
- Length: 2:39
- Label: Decca F11693
- Songwriter: Geoff Goddard
- Producer: Joe Meek

Heinz singles chronology
"Dreams Do Come True" (1963)	"Just Like Eddie" (1963)	"I Get Up In The Morning" (1963)

"Just Like Eddie" is a song by recording artist Heinz. The song was his second solo release after leaving the band The Tornados.

== Background ==
The song was a tribute to American rock 'n' roll pioneer Eddie Cochran. The song was produced and engineered by Joe Meek and was released via the record label Decca in 1963. The guitar on the track was played by Ritchie Blackmore, later a founding member of Deep Purple. The song was written by Joe Meek's associate Geoff Goddard. The song was Heinz's only successful song as a solo artist when it entered the Top 20 in the UK Singles Chart. The song peaked at number 5 on that chart. The B-side featured the song, "Don't You Knock On My Door".

Heinz's other singles were "Country Boy" (1963), and "You Were There" (1963).

== Reception ==
In his book, Rock & Roll: Facts, Figures & Fun, Mike Evans said that it was a tribute record that was not opportunistic like others, because it was released three years after Cochran's death.

== Inclusions and covers ==
"Just Like Eddie" was featured on two Decca compilation EPs following its release. These were titled "Various Artists: Thank Your Lucky Stars Vol 2" and "Various Artists: Ready Steady Go". These were respectively released in June and July 1963. It was included on Heinz's "Tribute To Eddie" collection in September 1963. The song was featured on the Just Like Eddie compilation CD released on 7 August 1995. In 2013, it was included on Heinz - The Essential Collection.

The song has been covered by the Finnish band Teddy and the Tigers. "Just Like Eddie" was later covered by the British electro group Silicon Teens.

== Track listing ==
- 7" vinyl
1. "Just Like Eddie" – 2:39
2. "Don't You Knock On My Door" – 1:50

== Bibliography ==
- Zak, Albin (2001). The Poetics of Rock Cutting Tracks, Making Records. University of California Press. ISBN 0-52023-224-0.
- Evans, Mike (2005). Rock & roll : facts, figures & fun. Facts, Figures & Fun. ISBN 1-90433-236-6.
- Bloom, Jerry (2007). Black Knight. Music Sales Group. ISBN 978-0-85712-053-3.
- Popoff, Martin (2009). Goldmine Price Guide to 45 RPM Records. Krause Publications. ISBN 978-0-89689-958-2.
- Talevski, Nick (2010). Rock Obituaries - Knocking on Heaven's Door. Omnibus. ISBN 978-0-85712-117-2.
