= Fad Gadget =

British electronic musician and vocalist

- Fad Gadget in 2001

Background information
- Born: Francis John Tovey; 8 September 1956; London, England
- Died: 3 April 2002 (aged 45) London
- Genres: Industrial; new wave; synth-pop; post-punk
- Years active: 1979–1993; 2001–2002
- Label: Mute
- Past members: John Dignham; Cam Donnelly
- Website: fadgadget.co.uk

Francis John Tovey (8 September 1956 – 3 April 2002), known also by his stage name Fad Gadget, was a British avant-garde electronic musician and vocalist. He was a proponent of both new wave and early industrial music, fusing pop-structured songs with mechanised experimentation.

As Fad Gadget, his music was characterised by the use of synthesizers in conjunction with sounds of found objects, including drills and electric razors. His bleak, sarcastic and darkly humorous lyrics were filled with biting social commentary toward subjects such as machinery, industrialisation, consumerism, human sexuality, mass media, religion, domestic violence and dehumanization, often sung in a deadpan voice.

== Early years ==
As a child, Frank Tovey lived in Bow. His father, Frank Tovey, Sr. was a porter in Billingsgate Fish Market. At school, Francis tried to learn many different musical instruments. He realised he did not have the co-ordination to be able to play any of them really well. Tovey drifted away from the idea of playing music, and began getting involved in other art forms instead. He later studied visual arts and mime at Leeds Polytechnic. He felt the need to give his mime act some sort of musical accompaniment so he went back to the idea of recording music. The initial musical pieces were formed of sound manipulation using tape recorders.

Tovey began experimenting using an old Grundig tape recorder. He disconnected the erase head from the playback head and installed a simple switch between the two. This gave him control over what sounds could be erased or kept. He spent a lot of time building up sound collages using this method. After finishing full-time education Tovey began working at various jobs and around the mid 1970s managed to set up his own home studio. At the time he was living in London, in a small house. The only space where he could set up his studio was in a cupboard. The initial equipment he used consisted mainly of his Grundig tape recorder. At this time he was using no musical instrument at all. The first keyboard instrument he owned was a Crumar Compac electric piano. He also bought a Korg Minipops drum machine from a home organ shop. He eventually decided to purchase a Korg synthesiser. He thought that due to his lack of musical ability he would be able to create some impressive sounds. After the purchase of this equipment he began writing music seriously; it was at this time he sent a demo tape of "Back to Nature" to Daniel Miller, who had just released his first single as the Normal.

== Signing to Mute Records ==
Frank Tovey signed as Fad Gadget to Daniel Miller's Mute Records. He was the first artist to sign to Mute. "Back to Nature" was recorded as the second Mute Records release at RMS Studio in London. At the time RMS was an eight track studio. Gadget had no real experience of recording within a studio environment, so he left most of the decision making to Daniel Miller. Most of the recorded instruments on "Back to Nature" belonged to Tovey, although he used equipment belonging to Miller as well; this included an ARP 2600 synthesiser.

"Back to Nature" was a success for Mute Records so a follow-up record was produced; the follow-up was titled "Ricky's Hand". The recording included Gadget's wife, Barbara, singing a vocal part near the end of the recording; the vocal part is then mixed with a synthesiser part into the outro of the song. Fad Gadget then went on to record an album for Mute Records. Fireside Favourites was recorded at Blackwing Studios in London. He decided to record the album without Daniel Miller's assistance.

Gadget felt it was important that he made all the decisions about recording the album himself. Gadget also felt the ideas and concepts behind his live performances were just as important. His live appearances progressed to dressing in theatrical costumes, reflecting back to his days studying visual arts, and he quickly became known for his confrontational stage antics. Some of these included covering himself in tar and feathers, swinging his microphone like a whip, leaping backwards into the audience, dancing across bar tables while kicking over people's drinks, climbing up speakers, hanging from ceiling fixtures, pulling out his body hair and playing instruments with his head, often ending up in personal injury. Gadget was particularly infamous for spreading shaving cream on his naked body onstage, an image of which is depicted on the cover of The Best of Fad Gadget. Sounds magazine described him as "...the bumbling but talented Dr Who of electro-pop". In 1981 Gadget released another one-off single on Mute Records, "Make Room", featuring the b-side "Lady Shave", which went on to become "one of his most iconic tracks".

== Recording ==
Fad Gadget recorded two more albums for Mute Records at Blackwing Studios which was using more complex recording equipment. Incontinent and Under the Flag showed a progressive change in Gadget's music; due both to the technological advances and his own growing knowledge of recording techniques. It was during the recording of Under the Flag that he began using the Roland MC-4 Microcomposer. This made it easy for Tovey to create a more controlled style of music. This style was carried on with the recording of the album Gag.

The recording of Gag was a turning point in Gadget's recording career. It would be the first time he used a band of musicians to record an album; before he had recorded most of the musical parts himself. It would also see a major change in the recording location from London to Hansa Tonstudio in Berlin. He had wanted a break from the way he had been recording in London. The acoustic spaces in the German studio had excited Gadget. He was also excited about the recording equipment that was installed at Hansa at that time, including the computer controlled mixing desk. He found the new recording practices refreshing, having other people collaborating in the writing and recording process. Some of these collaborators included the viola player, Joni Sackett, and keyboard player, David Simmonds. The recordings included many acoustic instruments, which veered away from the electronic instruments which had been used on previous recording sessions. Fad Gadget had used synthesisers when they were not fashionable to use – he had now moved away from electronic instrumentation when it was the current trend with other recording artists.

During the recording of Gag the German industrial band, Einstürzende Neubauten, were recording for Some Bizzare Records at Hansa and had been the support act for Fad Gadget at a gig at "The Loft" venue in Berlin. Frank liked their use of industrial equipment and found objects, something he had encouraged Nick Cash (his drummer and percussionist since his first album) to do. Fad Gadget heard a large printing press nearby which had a distinctive rhythm and got Gareth Jones, the co-producer/engineer, to record it. The recording was looped and became the basis for "Collapsing New People." (Einstürzende Neubauten translated means, "collapsing new buildings.") The sample was used firstly on two tracks on Fad Gadget's "Collapsing New People" 12" released November 1983. All these recordings were engineered by Gareth Jones and the sample used was stored on his Akai sampler with Cash drumming along and keeping the swing of the machine. Gadget then thought it would be good to ask Neubauten if they would add some of their percussion noise to the mix; however, Frank thought there was enough going on in the track and their contribution was used on the b-side "Spoil The Child" and on the 12" mix of the song. Neubauten's percussion was overdubbed over the already recorded backing tracks. The percussion tracks proved difficult to mix at the final stage, but Gadget was pleased with the final result. The track "Collapsing New People" was released as a single by Mute Records.

After recording the album Gag, Gadget began recording under his real name – Frank Tovey. He carried on moving toward acoustic instruments and in 1984 had decided he might want to record on his own again. He recorded several LPs of more experimental work under the name Frank Tovey, beginning with Easy Listening for the Hard of Hearing, a collaboration with Boyd Rice recorded in 1981.

In 1989, he changed musical tactics in his criticism of industrialisation, recording a mostly acoustic album of protest and labour songs Tyranny and the Hired Hand, including such standards as "Sixteen Tons". He then tried his hand at writing similar material, recorded two more albums with a backing band named the Pyros. After touring in 1993, Gadget withdrew from the music business.

== Final years ==
In his later years, Gadget began to perform at festivals and also supported his former colleagues and Mute label-mates, Depeche Mode, on their European tour. He was working on a new album at the time of his death. Fad Gadget suffered from heart problems since childhood, and died of a heart attack on 3 April 2002 at the age of 45. In 2006, with the Pyros and family, he has two movies dedicated to him, Fad Gadget by Frank Tovey and Grand Union: A Documentary.

== Legacy and influence ==
Despite a lack of commercial success, Fad Gadget is regarded as a pioneer in synth-pop, electro and industrial music. He influenced bands and artists such as Depeche Mode, Vince Clarke (of Erasure), Boy George (of Culture Club), Information Society, cEvin Key (of Skinny Puppy), Liars, The Twilight Sad, and DJ Premier. EBM band Suicide Commando also credit him with influencing their sound in an interview with journalist Ramona Depares.

His album Gag was ranked number 76 in Treblezine's list of "The Top 100 Best Post-Punk Albums".

== Discography ==
Studio albums

- Fireside Favourites (1980)
- Incontinent (1981)
- Under the Flag (1982)
- Gag (1984)

As Frank Tovey

- Easy Listening for the Hard of Hearing (with Boyd Rice) (1984)
- Snakes & Ladders (1986)
- Civilian (1988)
- Tyranny and the Hired Hand (1989)
- Grand Union (1991)
- Worried Men in Second-Hand Suits (1992)
