= Mute Records =

British record label

- Parent company: Mute Artists Ltd.: Independent (2010–present); Mute Records Ltd.: (Note: Back catalogue); Independent (1978–2002); EMI Group (2002–2012); Universal Music Group (2012); BMG (2013–present)
- Founded: 1978; 48 years ago
- Founder: Daniel Miller
- Distributors: Mute Artists Ltd.: PIAS Group (worldwide, 2013–present); Alternative Distribution Alliance (North America, 2014–present); Mute Records Ltd.: Alternative Distribution Alliance (worldwide, 2017–2023); Universal Music Group (worldwide, 2023–present) (physical); BMG Rights Management (digital)
- Genre: Rock; electronic; alternative rock; experimental
- Country of origin: United Kingdom
- Location: Hammersmith, London
- Official website: mute.com

Mute Records is a British independent record label owned and founded in 1978 by Daniel Miller. It has featured several prominent musical acts on its roster such as Depeche Mode, Diamanda Galás, Erasure, Einstürzende Neubauten, Fad Gadget, Goldfrapp, Grinderman, Arca, Inspiral Carpets, Moby, New Order, Laibach, Nitzer Ebb, Yann Tiersen, Wire, Yeasayer, Fever Ray, Nick Cave and the Bad Seeds, Yazoo, and M83.

== History ==
=== Beginnings ===
During 1978, Daniel Miller began recording music, using synthesisers, under the name The Normal. He recorded the tracks "T.V.O.D." and "Warm Leatherette" and distributed them through Rough Trade Shops under the label name Mute Records. The label was formed initially just to release the one single. "T.V.O.D."/"Warm Leatherette" became a cult hit ensuring the future of the label. "Warm Leatherette" was later covered by Grace Jones and Chicks on Speed as well as Rose McDowell and Laibach (in a German version, as "Warme Lederhaut").

After meeting Robert Rental (who had previously worked with Thomas Leer), Miller began recording and playing live as Robert Rental & The Normal. In 1979 the band went on tour supporting the punk band Stiff Little Fingers, which had just released an album distributed by Rough Trade.

=== 1980–1989 ===
In 1980, Miller released the single "Kebab-Träume" by the German band Deutsch Amerikanische Freundschaft (D.A.F.), who had recently moved to London. The band's 1980 album, Die Kleinen und die Bösen, was the first album released by the new label. The album had the catalogue prefix "STUMM", a play on the record label's name, meaning "mute" in German. This prefix was used through most of the label's album catalogue.

Also in 1980, Miller recorded and released the cover single "Memphis Tennessee" under the name Silicon Teens. The band was Miller's realisation of a dream Mute Records group whose main instruments were synthesisers. In mid-1980, Mute Records released the Silicon Teens' album, titled Music For Parties.

Around this time the artist Fad Gadget had begun recording new demos, including the track "Back To Nature". This was released as a single in 1980, followed by the next single "Ricky's Hand" and the album Fireside Favourites recorded at Blackwing Studios.

Previous logo

September 1980 saw the release of the double-holed, multi-speed 7" single by Non & Smegma, one of the first experimental noise releases from the label. Boyd Rice (Non) went on to release several more recordings with Mute Records. After touring with Daniel Miller as Robert Rental & The Normal, Robert Rental released his only Mute Records single, "Double Heart", a rare remaining trace of this late electronic music pioneer.

Miller approached Depeche Mode in 1980, after seeing them perform in London, wanting them to record a single for his label; that first single was "Dreaming of Me". Emerging out of the British electronic pop scene, Depeche Mode quickly asserted themselves as a radio-friendly pop group, and they had hits with their next three singles, including the UK top ten single "Just Can't Get Enough". Their loyalty to Mute was reciprocated by the label's rapid expansion to cope with their success. In defiance of the major record labels' predictions of failure, Depeche Mode became successful worldwide, even after the departure of principal songwriter Vince Clarke. Martin Gore took over the main songwriting role, opening the band up to different influences and sustaining their creativity.

Mute continued to support other experimental artists, such as NON, releasing an album of Boyd Rice's pre-NON recordings, titled Boyd Rice. 1982 began with the release of the 12-inch single, "Rise", by Boyd Rice, released under the name NON.

Fad Gadget released his third album for the label, titled Under the Flag, influenced by the current Falklands War and the feeling of being British in the most unseemly of times. The album spawned the singles "For Whom the Bells Toll" and "Life on the Line".

Mute Records' big commercial success of 1982 was the band Yazoo, the duo of Vince Clarke and Alison Moyet. After leaving Depeche Mode, Clarke had set up a studio in the Blackwing Studios complex, where he recorded the singles "Only You" and "Don't Go". That year, Mute licensed the single "Fred Vom Jupiter" from the German record label Atatak. The track was recorded by Holger Hiller, Andreas Dorau and the schoolgirl Marinas. Also from Germany was the single "Los Ninos Del Parque", by Liaisons Dangereuses, later released by Mute. Liaisons Dangereuses included Chrislo Hass, who had previously been in the German band DAF.

After returning from a world tour in 1983, Depeche Mode released the industrial-influenced hit single "Everything Counts". Bruce Gilbert and Graham Lewis, of the band Wire (who had been working together under the name Dome), teamed up with Daniel Miller to form a project known as Duet Emmo, an anagram of Mute and Dome. They released an album and 12-inch single, both titled Or So It Seems. Miller also secured the rights to the back catalogue of the experimental bands Throbbing Gristle, Cabaret Voltaire and Richard H. Kirk

During 1983, the Australian band The Birthday Party transferred from 4AD to Mute Records. The band broke up after releasing their final 12-inch EP, "Mutiny". Birthday Party's singer, Nick Cave, stayed with Mute and released his debut single as Nick Cave and the Bad Seeds. The single was a cover of the song "In the Ghetto", by Mac Davis, previously made famous by Elvis Presley. Yazoo released the album You and Me Both that year and disbanded. Vince Clarke then began working at Blackwing Studios under the name The Assembly. The project's first single, "Never Never", was a hit, featuring Feargal Sharkey on vocals.

D.A.F. split up, and in 1983, ex-member Robert Görl released the single "Mit Dir" on Mute. He recorded the album Night Full of Tension the following year, including the single "Darling Don't Leave Me", featuring Annie Lennox. In 1984, Depeche Mode had one of their biggest hits in the UK with the single "People Are People". Their album that year, Some Great Reward, reached number one in Germany and became their first hit in the United States.

Mute released an album of archive material from the German band Einstürzende Neubauten, titled Strategies Against Architecture '80–'83, compiled by Jim Thirlwell. Mute used Berlin as a recording location at this time. Einstürzende Neubauten member F.M. Einheit contributed on the recording of the Fad Gadget album Gag, along with Rowland S. Howard (ex-guitarist for The Birthday Party), who also contributed to the 1983 Fad Gadget single "I Discover Love". Einstürzende Neubauten's Blixa Bargeld began working with Nick Cave at this time, playing guitar with Nick Cave and the Bad Seeds. The resulting 1984 album, From Her to Eternity, included a cover of Leonard Cohen's song, "Avalanche".

In 1984, Bruce Gilbert extended his field of music into dance after a commission to write music for dancer Michael Clark. Gilbert recorded with engineer John Fryer at Blackwing Studios. The recordings were documented by Mute on the album, This Way.

The synth duo I Start Counting released their debut single, "Letters to a Friend", in June 1984, produced by Daniel Miller. In subsequent years, the band would also record for the label under the names Fortran 5, John Came and Komputer. 1984 ended with the long delayed release of Easy Listening for the Hard of Hearing by Frank Tovey and Boyd Rice. The album was originally recorded at Blackwing Studios in May 1981, using sounds created from non-musical appliances, and other studio-generated sounds. The recordings were engineered by John Fryer and Eric Radcliffe.

In 1985, a new incarnation of Simon Bonney's Crime & the City Solution formed, including ex-Birthday Party members Mick Harvey and Rowland S. Howard. The new line-up released the EP The Dangling Man and later the mini-album Just South of Heaven. Mute released the single "Hypnotized" in May 1985, by newly signed artist Mark Stewart, produced by Adrian Sherwood. Stewart recorded his first album for Mute, As the Veneer of Democracy Starts to Fade, in November 1985, also produced by Sherwood, under the name Mark Stewart and the Mafia. Nick Cave and the Bad Seeds released their second album, The Firstborn Is Dead, recorded at the Berlin recording studio, Hansa Tonstudio, co-produced by Flood.

Fad Gadget began recording as Frank Tovey in 1985 and released the single "Luxury" in August that year, co-produced with Daniel Miller. Vince Clarke and Andy Bell began recording as Erasure in 1985, and released their debut album the next year.

Frank Tovey released his first album under his own name after leaving his Fad Gadget moniker behind him. The new album was titled Snakes and Ladders. The initial release included a twelve-inch single containing four Fad Gadget tracks.

To celebrate five years of Depeche Mode, Mute released a compilation album of the band's singles, The Singles 81→85. A remastered edition was issued in October 1998 with additional tracks, including an original version of the song "Photographic", released on Some Bizzare Records. Wire member Graham Lewis launched his project in 1985, known as He Said, with Mute releasing the project's debut single, "Only One I". Lewis released his debut album the following year after two more singles.

Erasure released the single "Sometimes" in 1986, and it became a UK top ten hit. I Start Counting finished recording their debut album, My Translucent Hands, in this same year. Wire re-grouped to record a 12-inch single, "Snakedrill", produced by Daniel Miller and Gareth Jones. Band member Bruce Gilbert went on to produce the 12-inch single "Just Talk", for A.C. Marias.

Two Nick Cave and the Bad Seeds albums were released in 1986. The first was Kicking Against the Pricks, a collection of covers including All Tomorrow's Parties and Something's Gotten Hold of My Heart. The second album released in November 1986 was Your Funeral... My Trial.

Mute signed the American female singer Diamanda Galás who in her first year with Mute released The Divine Punishment and Saint of the Pit.

Mute carried out a licensing deal with the Japanese company Wave. This gave Mute the rights to release the Japanese financed album titled Oben Im Eck by Holger Hiller; the album was released in November 1986.

Crime & the City Solution released new material in 1986 including the album Room of Lights and the twelve inch single Kentucky Click/Adventure. The new album won the band acclaim in the European press showing the Australian band's growing popularity across Europe.

The end of 1986 saw Mute Records sign the Yugoslav band Laibach. The following year Mute released the band's album Opus Dei, which included the cover single, Life is Life. Also at the end of 1986 the band Wire returned to the studio with producer Gareth Jones. In 1987 Mute released the result of the studio sessions, the album The Ideal Copy.

1987 saw Depeche Mode recording and working with a new producer Dave Bascombe. In September, Mute released Music for the Masses. The album was supported by a world tour. During the promotional tour for the new album, Depeche Mode became increasingly popular in the musical mainstream. The 101st concert they performed was recorded and made into a film, documenting one of their largest attended concerts. A live album of the concert was released in 1989 titled 101. The Music for the Masses tour saw new Mute artists Nitzer Ebb performing as a supporting act. They had already released two singles with Mute before releasing their debut album, That Total Age, in May 1987.

=== 1990–2001 ===
Mute released Mark Stewart's album, Metatron, in May 1990, which included the single, "Hysteria". Stewart continued working with producer Adrian Sherwood. Mute signed Goldfrapp in 1999, consisting of Alison Goldfrapp and Will Gregory. The duo began recording their debut album, Felt Mountain, in a hired cottage in Wiltshire, South West England. Goldfrapp completed the recording after six months, and the album was released in September 2000.

Mute was one of the first British record labels to have an Internet presence, entitled Mute Liberation Technologies. This started out running as an FTP site, Telnet site and a bulletin board system in 1994. They continued to be run in tandem for a number of years until they were shut down. Mute Liberation Technologies has been running as a website since 1995. A newer version of the site was launched in July 2004.

In 2001, Rough Trade Records celebrated the 25th anniversary of the opening of their first retail shop. To mark the anniversary, Mute released the Rough Trade Shops 25 Years four CD box set. The album release coincided with ten days of special live events across London. Tracks appearing on the box set were carefully chosen to represent some of the most popular records sold during the past twenty five years at Rough Trade shops; these included recordings by Nick Cave, Joy Division and Stereolab.

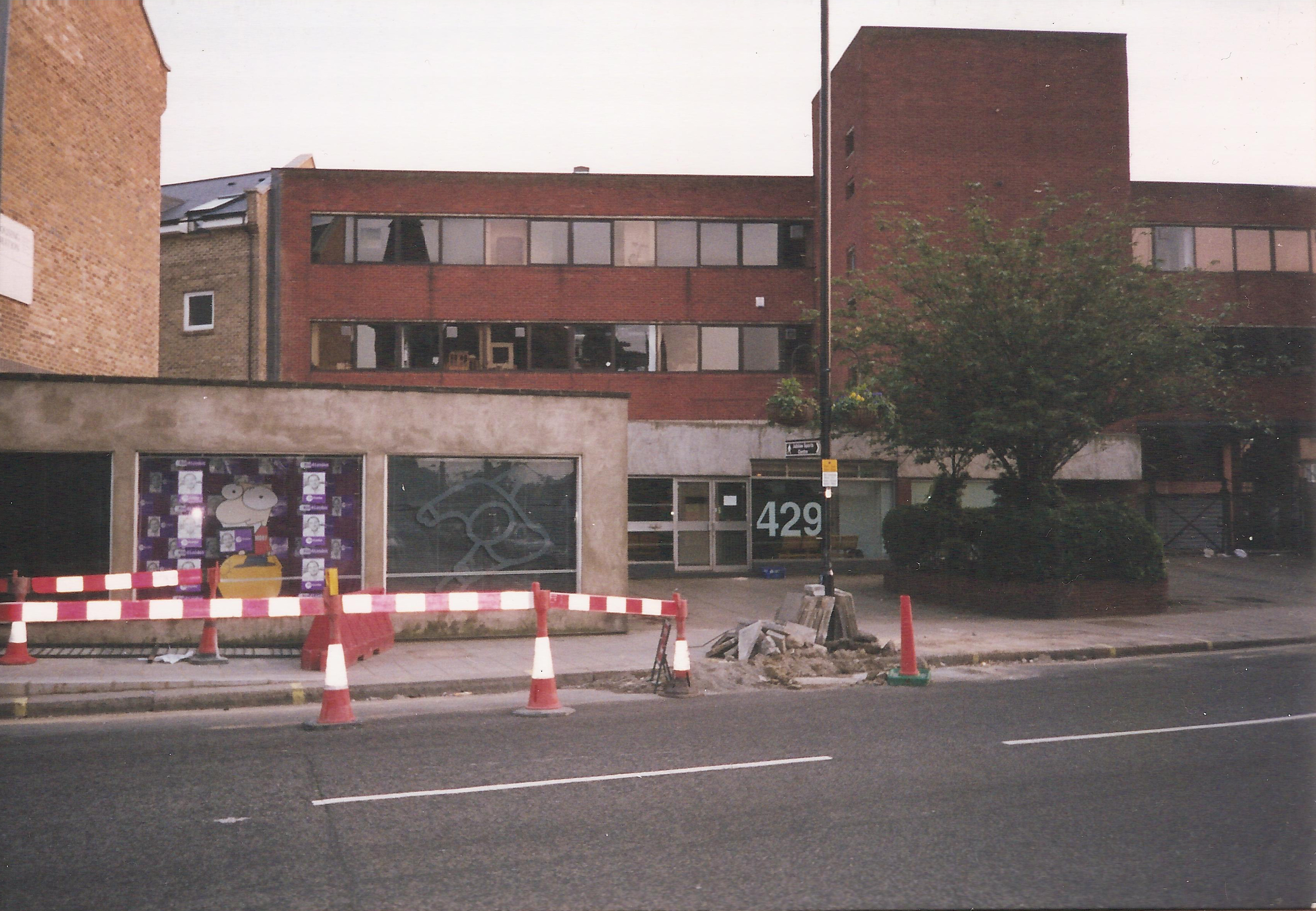
Mute Records building in Harrow Road 429, London, depicted in early 2000. Ads for Moby's "Play" can be seen in the windows.

=== 2002–2009, the EMI years ===
In May 2002, Mute Records was bought by EMI for £23m. The deal was finalized even though one in four acts signed by EMI faced being dropped by the label after job cuts in March 2002. Daniel Miller remained in charge of the company's global activities. During that period, the label released eleven CDs of music by The Residents. Some CDs were rereleases of albums previously published on Ralph Records in the 70s and 80s and some new work from the San Francisco's group such as Animal Lover and The Voice of Midnight.

Mute released the single "Dirty Sticky Floors" in May 2003, from Depeche Mode singer Dave Gahan's debut solo album, Paper Monsters. Gahan debuted as a songwriter on the album, written and recorded along with Gahan's friend, Knox Chandler. Mute released another Depeche Mode solo project that year, Counterfeit² by Martin Gore, a collection of cover songs recorded at Gore's home studio. The eleven tracks on the album included songs that were recorded originally by Iggy Pop, John Lennon, and Brian Eno.

=== 2010 ===
Goldfrapp released their fifth album, Head First, in March 2010. Recorded in 2009 in Bath and London, the album included the singles "Rocket" and "Alive".

The American band Liars also released a new album in March 2010, Sisterworld, which included the single "Scissor", as a digital download.

In September 2010, EMI and Daniel Miller reached an agreement in which EMI would support Miller in the establishment of a second record label. The Mute brand once again became an independent record label as Mute Artists Ltd. The new label would operate under the Mute trademark, which would be licensed by EMI and will be supported by EMI via services such as sales, licensing, and distribution. Daniel Miller was given full control of the new label, which left EMI with a minority equity interest in the company. To help fund the new label, EMI licensed part of the Mute back catalogue, also giving support in areas such as royalty administration and business affairs. Current Mute artists such as Depeche Mode, Kraftwerk, and Goldfrapp remained signed to and marketed by EMI Music. Many other bands, including Erasure and Nick Cave and the Bad Seeds moved over to Miller's new independent label.

October 2010 saw the release of Dust Lane by the French artist Yann Tiersen. The album incorporated vintage electronic sounds and textures recorded over two years in France and the Philippines. In November Mute released Einstürzende Neubauten's fourth album in the Strategies Against Architecture series. The album continues with an archive compilation of the band's output from 2002 to 2010.

=== 2012 ===
In 2012, albums by Cold Specks, Liars, Crime & the City Solution, and Soulsavers were released, among others.

The Germany-based BMG Rights Management acquired the original Mute back catalogue from Universal in December 2012, as part of the regulator-forced sale of European assets belonging to EMI Music that were acquired by Universal Music in September 2012. EMI kept the rights of the Mute archives when Miller took the company independent in 2010. In May 2013, the EC approved the catalogue acquisition. Months after acquiring the Mute catalogue, BMG selected INgrooves to distribute the catalogue in North America, PIAS Recordings for all other territories, and Sony Music Entertainment to distribute Depeche Mode.

=== 2014 ===
In the aftermath of the Universal's acquisition of EMI, in February 2014, Mute left Caroline Distribution, once part of former parent EMI, and signed a new USA distribution deal with Alternative Distribution Alliance, returning to Warner Music Group, which was its American home 20 years prior. European distribution for Mute was now handled by PIAS. In September 2014 New Order announced that it had signed with Mute Records for its tenth studio album.

=== 2017 ===
The wholly independent label continued to sign new artists such as Lee Ranaldo plus the catalogues Goldfrapp's final studio album Silver Eye, Throbbing Gristle and A Certain Ratio plus released new albums from Erasure and Ben Frost amongst others. In November 2017, the book Mute: A Visual Document: From 1978 – Tomorrow was released in partnership with Thames & Hudson, the book was named Book of the Year by Rough Trade. Additionally the label relaunched the legendary techno label NovaMute with releases from Nicolas Bougaïeff and Terence Fixmer.

== Mute sub-labels ==
- Blast First (1985–2007, now independent under the name "Blast First Petite")
- The Grey Area (for reissues, 1986– )
- Rhythm King (associated between 1987 and 1991)
- Product Inc. (1987–1990)
- The Fine Line (for soundtracks, 1988–2004, currently inactive)
- Mute Film (for VHS/DVD releases, 1988– )
- Mute Sonet France (1988–1993, now defunct)
- Mute Czechoslovakia (1990–2001, now defunct)
- Novamute (1992–2008, 2017– )
- 13th Hour Recordings (1994–2000, probably defunct)
- Mute Corporation (in USA) (created in 1994)
- Trophy Records (1995–1996, for Moby's side-projects/aliases only)
- Interpop (1995–2006, probably defunct)
- Parallel Series (1996–1997, now independent)
- Future Groove (1999–2003, probably defunct)
- Mute Tonträger (in Germany) (2000–2006, probably defunct)
- Live Here Now (created in 2004, 2009–2015, EMI sublabel under the name "Abbey Road/Live Here Now", now independent)
- Mute Irregulars (2007–2009, probably defunct)
- Liberation Technologies (2012–2016, currently inactive)
