= John Fryer (producer) =

- Born: 1958 (age 67–68); London, England
- Years active: 1980s–present
- Spouse: Trace Fryer

John Fryer (born 1958) is a multi-platinum record producer of international acclaim. Best known for his production work, he has also performed as a musician, as one of the two constant members of This Mortal Coil (along with Ivo Watts-Russell), providing keyboards, strings and synthesizer sequencing for the band, and its offshoot, the Hope Blister.

He is married to musician, artist, and gallerist Trace Fryer.

== Career ==
In 1980, he worked as assistant at Blackwing Studios, which was British recording studio created by Eric Radcliffe. The studio would go on to become famous for recording music from the likes of Depeche Mode and other bands. Fryer explained in an interview the environment of the studio:

Back then the equipment was so limited, you had to work out ways of getting the most out of everything. There were no sync tones, (Note: Essentially, an audible marker that can be used to align the tracks.) so we were using the ARP and its analogue sequencer, and because it worked on CV and Gate, we devised a way of recording the click from that and feeding it back on itself, so you'd get a couple of chances of running sequences in time with the tape. You'd record a kick and snare on it and everything was played live over the top. The drums were the ARP and then it was Moog bass and so on. We used whatever was available. If it wasn't there, it was hired in.

From assistant, he was promoted from engineering to production. One of his first clients as a producer was the Scottish rock band, the Cocteau Twins.

Fryer is also known for his production work in the industrial rock genre, working with Nine Inch Nails, Cocteau Twins, Depeche Mode, M|A|R|R|S, Clan Of Xymox, Die Krupps, This Mortal Coil, Love And Rockets, Stabbing Westward and Gravity Kills. In 1981, he had produced Fad Gadget's Incontinent. He later worked with the Italian band Dope Stars Inc on their debut album, Neuromance.

In 2003, he created Something To Listen To Records. In early 2010, Fryer began collaborating with Stripmall Architecture vocalist Rebecca Coseboom under the name Dark Drive Clinic.

In 2017, Fryer mixed both The Cross and The Dream by the York-based post-punk and industrial rock band, Mary and The Ram. He has since continued to work on various musical projects, including Dark Drive Clinic. In 2025, Fryer and his wife, artist and vocalist Trace Fryer, formed the group Something Romantical and put together the music for the soundtrack for the short film The Winter Solstice Eruption by Lance Page of Page Films.

== Views on music ==
In the interview for the article John Fryer: Punk kicked the doors of the industry open, Fryer discussed punk rock:

Musicians realized they could do whatever they wanted without conforming to the major labels’ mould. A slew of indie labels emerged, giving artists opportunities to express themselves in new ways, sparking tremendous creativity.

With the various bands he had worked with, Fryer explained:

Black Needle Noise is my favorite to work with because it’s my own music and it’s more personal. I’m very proud of all the records that I’ve made, but that’s working on other people’s music. Actually, all the projects I’ve done myself Dark Drive Clinic, Muricidae, Silver Ghost Shimmer, and Black Needle Noise are more personal because I’m writing the music.

== Bands ==
Bands with Fryer
Title	Year	Main performers
Dark Drive Clinic	2010	John Fryer, Rebecca Coseboom
Silver Ghost Shimmer	2013	John Fryer, Pinky Turzo
Muricidae	2015	John Fryer, Louis Fraser
Black Needle Noise	2017	John Fryer (producer/composer), Attasalina (vocalist), and various artists.
Something Romantical	2025	John Fryer, Trace Fryer

== Discography ==
For more complete discography, please see Albums produced by John Fryer.

Discography of John Fryer
Band	Album	Year	Role
Depeche Mode	Speak and Spell	1981	Engineering
Depeche Mode	A Broken Frame	1982	Engineering
Cocteau Twins	Garlands	1982	Producer
Cocteau Twins	Head Over Heels	1983	Producer
Nine Inch Nails	Pretty Hate Machine	1989	Producer
Love and Rockets	So aLive	2003	Co-producer

== Certifications for albums with Fryer as a producer ==
Pretty Hate Machine by Nine Inch Nails
Region	Certification
United Kingdom (BPI)	Platinum
Argentina (CAPIF)	Gold
United States (RIAA)	3 x Platinum

Razorblade Romance by HIM (Finnish Band)
Region	Certification
Austria (IFPI Austria)	Gold
Finland (Musiikkituottajat)	2 x Platinum
Germany (BVMI)	3 x Gold
Poland (ZPAV)	Gold
Switzerland (IFPI Switzerland)	Gold
United Kingdom (BPI)	Silver
