= Daniel Miller (music producer) =

British musician (born 1951)

- Born: Daniel Otto Joachim Miller; 14 February 1951 (age 75); Marylebone, London, England
- Genres: Post-punk; new wave; synth-pop; electronic; industrial
- Occupations: Record producer; music label founder
- Instruments: Synthesizer; keyboards; sampler; drum machine; guitar; saxophone
- Years active: 1968–present
- Label: Mute
- Website: mute.com

Daniel Otto Joachim Miller (born 14 February 1951) is an English record producer and founder of Mute Records.

== Biography ==
Miller is the son of two Austrian-Jewish refugees from Nazism, Martin Miller and Hannah Norbert-Miller, born into a family of actors.

Miller studied film and television at the Guildford School of Art (now University for the Creative Arts) from 1969 to 1972, where he became interested in synthesizer music. By the end of the 1960s, he became frustrated with rock music's lack of experimentation and became interested in the sound of German bands like Can, Faust, Neu! and Kraftwerk. Miller worked as a DJ in Switzerland before returning to England at the height of punk, which he enjoyed due to the energy and do-it-yourself attitude of the music. He later became interested in the electronic music scene, with bands such as Throbbing Gristle and Cabaret Voltaire, which inspired Miller to create his own music. Using money from film editing and working long hours, he gathered enough money to buy a cheap miniKORG 700S synthesizer and a TEAC four-track reel-to-reel tape recorder leading to the creation of the band, The Normal.

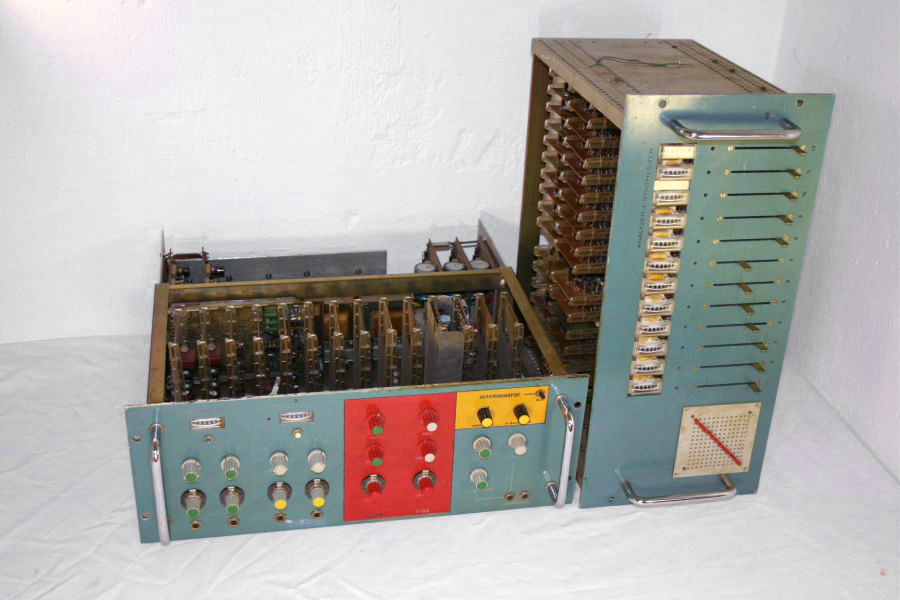
Early 1970's transistor vocoder custom built for and used by Kraftwerk for the album Ralf und Florian, now in the possession of Daniel Miller

=== Birth of Mute Records ===
After returning from a live tour, Miller found a pile of demo tapes on his doorstep. Because he had included his address on Normal's "Warm Leatherette" single cover, other acts had wanted a small-scale deal with Miller's Mute Records. The turning point for Mute came when Miller listened to a tape by an artist called Fad Gadget and liked what he heard. In 1979, Mute began releasing singles by Fad Gadget, including "Back to Nature". In 1980, Miller started working with the synth-pop band Depeche Mode, who would soon have commercial success. By 1982, with the success of Depeche Mode and their former member Vince Clarke's new synth-pop duo Yazoo, Mute had grown from an underground label run by Miller from his North-West London flat to a label releasing international hits.

== Music projects ==
=== The Normal ===
Miller recorded two songs, "T.V.O.D." and "Warm Leatherette". The latter was inspired by J. G. Ballard's novel Crash. He called it The Normal to demystify and make it very bland and completed the package by setting up a record label for the release, Mute. He had researched how to make a single so he got some test pressings. Not knowing anything about retail or distribution he approached Rough Trade Records in Portobello Road, London. Originally a record outlet, Rough Trade had expanded into a label and distribution network. Miller took a test pressing into the shop to see if they would be interested in buying a box of them. Rough Trade Records boss Geoff Travis went to the back of the shop with Miller and played "Warm Leatherette". They loved the recording and helped him press 2000 copies of the single. "Warm Leatherette" was released in May 1978 and sold out very quickly. After receiving critical acclaim for the project Miller decided to explore further. He had been helping out at the Rough Trade Shop when he was given an offer of live work. Not wanting to perform alone, he formed a duo with the late Robert Rental who was recording material in a similar style at the time. The live event was hosted by DJ Colin Faver and included Throbbing Gristle and Cabaret Voltaire. After that event, Miller and Rental took on a Rough Trade tour supporting Stiff Little Fingers. Miller and Rental went down very badly; Stiff Little Fingers were a traditional punk band supported by two people with synthesizers and a backing tape.

=== Silicon Teens ===
Another early Mute signing was the synthpop band Silicon Teens, with four imaginary band members: Darryl (played by Frank Tovey), Jacki, Paul, and Diane. The recordings were all recorded by Miller himself and engineered by Eric Radcliffe, who would later work on many other Mute releases. An album titled 'Music for Parties' was released in 1980 and consisted of classic rock 'n' roll songs, like 'Memphis, Tennessee' and 'Just Like Eddie', done in an upbeat synthpop style. The Silicon Teens gave an insight into Miller's idea of an all-synthesiser teenage pop group.

=== Duet Emmo ===
Duet Emmo was a one-off collaboration between Daniel Miller, Graham Lewis and Bruce Gilbert spawning an album and single, both titled 'Or So it Seems' in 1983. Lewis and Gilbert were both members of Wire until 1979 when the band split up. All three had been friends for a long time. They had all been using Blackwing Studios, and had shared the same engineer, Eric Radcliffe. An initial project had been suggested in 1980 but the success of Depeche Mode and Yazoo had kept Miller busy until the end of 1982. Lewis and Gilbert had both been releasing their own material under the name Dome. Duet Emmo was an anagram of Mute and Dome.

=== Sunroof ===
With fellow Depeche Mode music producer Gareth Jones, Daniel Miller has released a few remixes under the name Sunroof. Starting with a remix of "Oh Yeah" for the 1997 Can remix album Sacrilege, there has also surfaced remixes for Neu!, Kreidler, Pizzicato Five, Goldfrapp, Faust, MGMT, Charles Wilp, Ellis Island Sound, Future Bible Heroes and To Rococo Rot.

The Sunroof debut album, Electronic Music Improvisations Vol. 1, was released in May 2021. Vol. 2 followed in 2023, and Vol. 3 in 2024.

=== Mute: A Visual Document ===
In 2017, Miller co-authored Mute: A Visual Document (Thames & Hudson) with Terry Burrows. An illustrated hardback book that detailed the history of Mute Records, it was named Book of the Year by both Rough Trade and Electronic Sound magazine.
