= Boss DR-220 =

Series of digital drum machines by Boss Corporation

The Boss DR-220 Dr. Rhythm is a series of two budget-priced digital drum machines developed and manufactured by Boss Corporation (a subsidiary of Roland Corporation) beginning in 1985.

== Origin ==
The DR-220 derives from the earlier DR-110 (1983) without rotary controls but the same LCD "matrix" display panel, a much simplified version of that used in devices such as the Roland TR-707.

== Logic architecture ==
Each DR-220 has 11 pulse-code modulation (PCM) synthesizer "voices" available, plus an Accent; each voice is directly available for realtime play using the four-by-three grid of miniature pads (though these do not sense either velocity or pressure). The voices are in 12-bit resolution, each occupying a 128 KB Read-only memory (ROM) bank. Because of "channel sharing" restrictions due to circuitry limitations, some voices cannot be sounded simultaneously; for instance, only one tom may be used per beat. With the DR-220, up to 16 steps are displayed (or 12 in 3/4 tempo mode). The "hits" can be displayed only one pad at a time. A pattern can be recorded in realtime, or entered step-by-step. Each voice can be adjusted for Accent (values 0–5) and volume (values 0–5).

There are 32 in-built patterns, and another 32 are user-programmable and remain in memory after power-off. These patterns can then be joined into a "Song" of up to 128 bars (or 256 if the Song Chain feature is used to join two Songs), with memory space for up to eight Songs. Tempo can be manually adjusted between 40 and 250 bpm.

== Physical ports ==
Though there is no MIDI port, two 3.5 mm (1/8 in) jacks allow one DR-220 to control (or be controlled by) another. Sending this control voltage (CV) "steals" one voice from the master. Up to one control-voltage pulse can be sent per step, triggering the slave unit by one step. The DR-220 can also accept control from other devices such as a sequencer or trigger pad. The trigger output sends a +5vDC pulse for 8 msec maximum; the input recognizes +5v to +15v.

== Accessories ==
As with its predecessor, the DR-220 was packaged in a padded silver-vinyl snap-front carrying case, which provided a degree of protection to the device while allowing access to most of the controls and jacks on the front, sides, and back.

With the device were various printed guides:

- Owner's Manual
- Quick Operations Table fold-out
- System Initialization sheet
- Preset Patterns & Sample Patterns booklet
- Preset Patterns reference card

The DR-220 operates on battery power (four standard AA-size (Japan: UM-3) cells) or a Roland PSA series AC adapter. Dimensions (without padded vinyl case): 9.4" wide, 2.9" deep, 1.2" high. Case dimensions (max.): 10.0" wide, 3.38" deep, 1.5" high,

== Device differentiation ==
=== Boss DR-220A ===
Acoustic percussion samples. The plastic case is charcoal-gray.

- LT (low tom)
- MT (medium tom)
- HT (high tom)
- CCY (crash cymbal)
- RIM (rim shot)
- HCP (handclap)
- CH (closed high-hat)
- OH (open high-hat)
- BD (bass drum)
- SD (snare drum)
- RCY (ride cymbal)

=== Boss DR-220E ===
Electronic percussion samples, sounding similar to the 1981 Simmons SDSV, generally considered the first commercial electronic drum kit. The plastic case is matte silver.

- LT (low tom)
- MT (medium tom)
- HT (high tom)
- CHY (China cymbal)
- CB (cowbell)
- SLP (vibraslap)
- CH (closed high-hat)
- OH (open high-hat)
- BD (bass drum)
- SD (snare drum)
- CUP (cup cymbal)

== Subsequent devices ==
=== Boss DR-550 and DR-550 MkII ===
This later device shares the control array and display of the DR-220, with the addition of a MIDI In port. The MkII version had access to 91 16-bit drum sounds, allowing the user to control parameters of each sample such as decay length and filtering. It had 64 preset patterns and room for 64 user-created patterns. The DR-550 was limited by no ability to store its patterns externally, except by recording the data to a cassette tape.

=== Roland TR-505 ===
In 1986, Roland's TR-505 produced sounds similar to the DR-220A but added five voices, full MIDI implementation, and much more control over characteristics of voice and rhythm.
