= Novation (disambiguation) =

Novation is a legal term in contract and business law.

Novation may also refer to:

- Novation (Fringe), an episode of the Fringe television series
- Novation CAT, a defunct early modem manufacturer
- Novation Digital Music Systems, manufacturer of electronic musical equipment
  - Novation Supernova synthesizer
- One of the predecessor companies of Vizient, Inc.

== See also ==
- Novatian, the third century Roman bishop and theologian
