= Boss DR-110 Dr. Rhythm =

1983 drum machine by Boss

- Manufacturer: Boss
- Dates: 1983
- Price: US$1,195 £765 ¥150,000 JPY

Technical specifications
- Polyphony: 6
- Timbrality: 6
- Synthesis type: Analog subtractive
- Storage memory: 2 songs, 128 measures

Input/output
- Keyboard: 6 pattern keys
- External control: DIN sync in/out

The Boss DR-110 Dr. Rhythm is a drum machine introduced in 1983 by the Boss product division of the Japanese Roland Corporation. It was the second entry in their DR series, following up on the much simpler DR-55.

== History ==
Boss was better known for producing electric guitar accessories such as effects pedals, and the DR-110 is similarly small and lightweight in size (190×110×30mm, and only 450g), and, like most Boss equipment, could be run from a 9V d.c. supply [negative centre] or batteries.

Although not designed as a high-end studio product, the DR-110 nonetheless featured some noticeable advances in technology compared with previous Roland drum machines. It has an LCD graphic display, showing a step-programming grid for the various drum voices. Rubberized touchpads each represent one of the DR-110 voices, which can be used to build a pattern in real time as well as to enter and edit note data.

The DR-110's synthesized drum voices (synthesizer sounds) use analog synthesizer circuits. Tempo is continuously variable between 45 and 300 bpm. The DR-110 used a four-bit Hitachi HD44790A44 CMOS microprocessor and 0.5 KB of μPD444C RAM memory.

In 1985, Boss released the smaller DR-220 with eleven voices. These devices had much the same functionality as the DR-110, but relied upon digital button-press control of parameters rather than knobs.

The DR-110 has been cited as an influence on later compact analog drum synthesizers.

== Drum sounds ==
The DR-110's six synthesized drum voices were:

- bass drum
- snare drum
- open hi hat
- closed hi hat
- hand clap
- cymbal

As with most previous Roland drum machines, the bass and snare voices are generated by a "damped tuned resonance" oscillators. The cymbals and hi-hats are created by VCA-shaping and band-pass filtering a combination of white noise and four non-harmonically related square wave oscillators (generating a much more realistic sound than white noise alone). The clap sound uses only shaped white noise, but was triggered by a multiple pulse train, to create a reverberation effect. No tonal variation of the voices is possible; however (as with several earlier Roland drum machines), the relative balance is variable between the bass and snare drums versus the hi-hat and cymbal. An accent (volume increase) can also be added on any pattern step; the amount of accent is globally variable with a knob.

== Rhythm patterns ==
The DR-110 offers 16 preset patterns, and 16 memory locations for the user-created patterns. Each pattern can be divided into 16 or 12 steps. The DR-110 also has two "song" memories, each of which allows chaining of up to 128 bars of patterns. A small battery retains memory content when the DR-110 was switched off.

== Interfacing ==
A "V-trig" clock pulse (+6V, 10ms duration) can be used, via a 3.5mm mini-jack, to allow other "slave" synthesizer units (e.g. arpeggiators) to synchronize to the DR-110 accent section.

The DR-110 has a 10kΩ impedance unbalanced mono audio output, available on a ¼" phone connector socket. This output can be plugged into a keyboard amplifier or PA system. The socket is also configured as the "Roland P-bus," which meant it can be used as a simultaneous audio input, the input source being mixed with the output signal.

A separate 3.5mm headphone output socket is also present.

The DR-110 does not offer any kind of external "sync", but can be fitted with third-party DIN-sync interfaces available from other companies. Internally, the DR110 runs at 12ppqn (pulses per quarter note), so extra circuitry is needed to interface it with the Roland DIN-sync standard of 24ppqn.

To access the Test Mode function, users press and hold both the Start and Stop buttons when turning on the unit. The entire LED screen shows. The user presses the blue buttons one at a time; a big "OK" appears in the programming grid after last button. The user turns the unit off and then on to exit test mode and go back to normal mode.
