= DIN sync =

Synchronization interface for electronic musical instruments

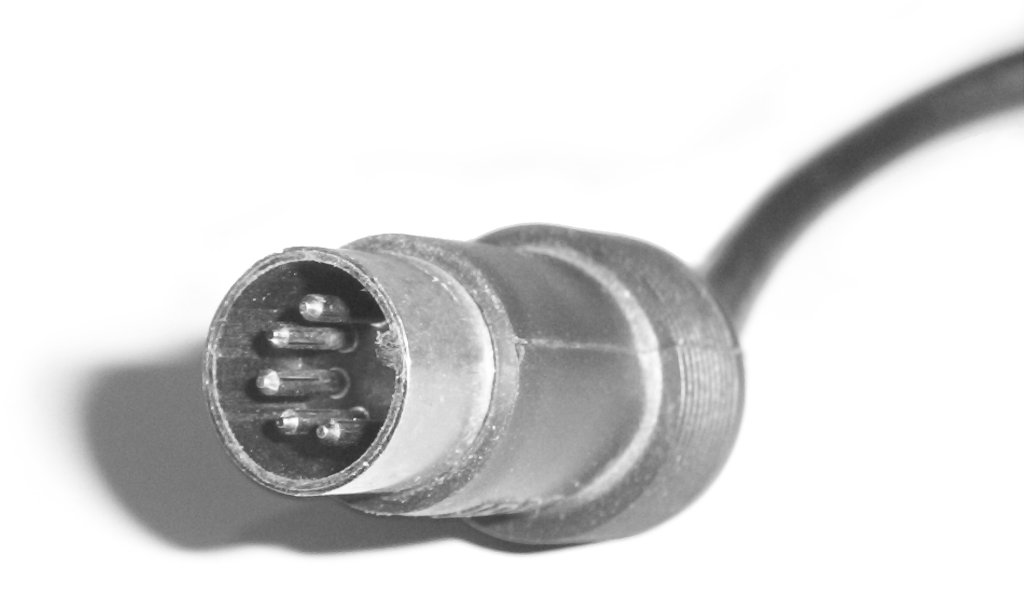

pin out

DIN sync, also called Sync24, is a synchronization interface for electronic musical instruments. It was introduced in 1980 by Roland Corporation and has been superseded by MIDI.

== Definition and history ==
DIN sync was introduced in 1980 by Roland Corporation with the release of the TR-808 drum machine. The intended use was the synchronization of music sequencers, drum machines, arpeggiators and similar devices. It was superseded by MIDI in the mid-to-late 1980s.

DIN sync consists of two signals, clock (tempo) and run/stop. Both signals are TTL compatible, meaning the low state is 0 V and the high state is about +5 V. The clock signal is a low-frequency pulse wave suggesting the tempo. Instead of measuring the waveform's frequency, the machine receiving the signal merely has to count the number of pulses to work out when to increment its position in the music. Roland equipment uses 24 pulses per quarter note, known as Sync24. Therefore, a Roland-compatible device playing sixteenth notes would have to advance to the next note every time it receives 6 pulses. Korg equipment uses 48 pulses per quarter note. The run/stop signal indicates whether the sequence is playing or not.

If a device is a DIN sync sender, the positive slope of start/stop must reset the clock signal, and the clock signal must start with a delay of 9 ms.

A detailed description on how to implement a DIN sync sender with Play, Pause, Continue and Stop functionality was published by E-RM Erfindungsbüro.

== Pinouts ==
DIN sync is so named because it uses 5-pin DIN connectors, the same as used for MIDI. DIN sync itself is not a DIN standard. Note that despite using the same connectors as MIDI, it uses different pins on these connectors (1, 2, and 3 rather than MIDI's 2, 4 and 5), so a cable made specifically for MIDI will not necessarily have the pins required for DIN sync connected. In some applications the remaining DIN sync pins (4 and 5) are used as tap and fill in or reset and start, but this differs from one device to another.

DIN sync pinout
Pin	Purpose	Notes
1	start/stop	stop = 0 volt, start = +5 volt
2	ground	
3	clock	symmetric pulse wave 0/+5 volt, the positive slope determines the clock step
4	reset start	optional; same voltages as start/stop; the reset is valid for the song mode of Roland machines
5	fill in	optional; same voltages as start/stop; it activated the fill-in function of the TR-808 and TR-606

Some manufacturers offer DIN sync over a 3.5 mm TRS minijack connection. Similar to the MIDI standard over TRS minijack, the aim is to reduce space in the device with a smaller connector.

DIN sync pinout over 3.5 mm TRS connector
Pin	Purpose	Notes
Tip	clock	symmetric pulse wave 0/+5 volt, the positive slope determines the clock step
Ring	start/stop	stop = 0 volt, start = +5 volt
Sleeve	ground	

== Relation to other clock systems ==
=== Other clock systems ===
The MIDI interface uses the same 5-pin DIN connectors but is electrically not compatible with DIN sync. The MIDI protocol features a MIDI beat clock. MIDI beat clock also works with 24 ticks per quarter note. MIDI timecode is used for more general timecode synchronization applications.

Analog clock signals are equivalent to the clock signal at pin 3 of DIN sync interface. The clock rate is usually higher than the DIN sync's rate. Typical values are 48, 96 or 192 pulses per quarter note (examples: Oberheim DMX, DX, DSX; LinnDrum 1 and 2).

Analog trigger signals transfer a pulse per musical event. For instance, a trigger corresponds to a step of an analog sequencer or an arpeggiator, a step in a rhythm pattern. Typical analog triggers run at four pulses per quarter note.

=== Combining with other clock systems ===
The combination of DIN sync with a different clock system can be achieved either by converting the format or the clock rate (see list below) or by using a central unit (so-called master clock), which provides multiple clock formats. The approach with a master clock is usually chosen, especially if synchronization with absolute time is required, such as synchronization with a tape recorder or with video footage.

Typical devices which can act as a master clock and provide DIN sync include the Sim'n Tonic Nome II, Roland SBX-80, Roland SBX-10, Friendchip SRC, E-RM multiclock and Yamaha MSS1. Many drum machines that have DIN sync and MIDI clock outputs can act as a master clock for those two formats.

Though DIN sync and MIDI clock have the same clock rate, they require a conversion of the format within a microprocessor or similar. The conversion from MIDI clock to DIN sync is available in many industrial devices. The conversion from DIN sync to MIDI clock can be performed by devices such as 'Sync-Split2' from Innerclock Systems, or D-Sync by Kenton Electronics. Also, two no longer produced devices do this type of conversion: Roland SBX10, Korg KMS30. On September 1, 2014, Roland introduced the SBX-1, which provides MIDI to sync24 or sync48 conversion.

To get an analog trigger or clock from the DIN syncs clock signal one has to use digital frequency division or frequency multiplication. The Electro-Harmonix Clockworks is one device that can provide a clock division. The Roland SBX10 can convert into a 48, 96, and 120 PPQN clock.

== Devices ==
Some devices have a DIN sync input as well as DIN sync output, other devices have only a single DIN socket, which sometimes can be switched between input and output.

Company	Model	In / Out	PPQN	Remark
Abstrakt Instruments	Avalon	In and out	24	Conversion between MIDI & DIN sync, can output both simultaneously
Acidlab	Bassline	Switchable	24	
Adafruit	x0xb0x	Switchable	24	Converts DIN sync to MIDI and MIDI to DIN sync
Arturia	BeatStep Pro	In and out	24/48	Provided over TRS connector. 1PPS, DIN24, DIN48
Arturia	Drumbrute	In and out	24/48	1PPS, 2PPQ, DIN24, DIN48 or analog clock (Note: Arturia Drumbrute offers DIN sync, Minibrute does not appear to support DIN)
Arturia	Drumbrute Impact	In and out	24/48	Provided over TRS connector. 1PPS, 2PPQ, DIN24, DIN48 or analog clock
audiowerkstatt	din2midi2din	In and out	24/48	Conversion from MIDI to DIN sync and DIN sync to MIDI (sync24/sync48)
audiowerkstatt	din-restarter	In and out	24/48	Tool for synchronized start/stop of DIN sync devices (sync24/sync48)
Behringer	RD-8	In and out	Various	1 PPQ, 2 PPQ, 4 PPQ, 24 PPQ, 48 PPQ. Provided over TRS connector, rate configurable on the device.
Behringer	TD-3-(MO)	In only	Various	1 PPQ, 2 PPQ, 4 PPQ, 24 PPQ, 48 PPQ. Provided over TRS connector, rate configurable on the device.
Detachment 3	Archangel	In and out	24	Conversion between MIDI & DIN, can output both simultaneously
Doepfer	M.A.U.S.I.	Out only		Conversion from MIDI to DIN sync, a division factor can be set
Doepfer	MCV-24	Out only	Up to 24	Conversion from MIDI to DIN sync, a division factor can be set
Doepfer	MSY2	Out only	1.5 to 24	Conversion from MIDI to DIN sync, a division factor can be set between 1:1 and 1:16
Elektron	Analog Four / Analog Four MKII / Analog Keys	Out only	24/48	MIDI Out jack and/or MIDI Thru jack can be set up to output DIN sync24/sync48
Elektron	Analog Rytm / Analog Rytm MKII	Out only	24/48	MIDI Out jack and/or MIDI Thru jack can be set up to output DIN sync24/sync48
Elektron	Analog Heat	Out only	24/48	MIDI Out jack and/or MIDI Thru jack can be set up to output DIN sync24/sync48
Elektron	Digitakt	Out only	24/48	MIDI Out jack and/or MIDI Thru jack can be set up to output DIN sync24/sync48
Elektron	Digitone/Digitone Keys	Out only	24/48	MIDI Out jack and/or MIDI Thru jack can be set up to output DIN sync24/sync48
Elektron	Syntakt	Out only	24/48	MIDI Out jack and/or MIDI Thru jack can be set up to output DIN sync24/sync48
E-RM Erfindungsbüro	Midiclock⁺	Out only	4, 24	Switchable MIDI / sync out jack can be set up to output sync24 or analog clock (4 PPQN)
Future Retro	Mobius	Out only	24	Provides MIDI to DIN sync conversion
Future Retro	Revolution	Out only	24	Provides MIDI to DIN sync conversion
JMK Music Pedals	CLOCKstep:MULTI	Out only	24	Outputs DIN sync and MIDI Clock. Provides conversion from MIDI Clock to DIN Sync.
JoMoX	XBase09	Switchable	24	
Kawai	R-100	Switchable		
Kenton Electronics	Pro-2	Out only	24	Provides MIDI clock to DIN sync conversion
Kenton Electronics	Pro-4	Out only	24	Provides MIDI clock to DIN sync conversion
Kenton Electronics	Pro-2000 / Pro-2000 mkII	Out only	24	Provides MIDI clock to DIN sync conversion
Kenton Electronics	Pro Solo mkII	Out only	24	Provides MIDI clock to DIN sync conversion
Kenton Electronics	Pro Solo mk3	Out only	Various	Provides MIDI clock to DIN sync conversion
Kenton Electronics	D-SYNC	In and out	24/48	Provides MIDI clock to DIN sync / DIN sync to MIDI clock conversion
KOMA Elektronik	RH301	In and out	24	sync24; converts MIDI & analogue clock to DIN sync and DIN sync to MIDI and analogue clock
Korg	KPR-77	Switchable	48	
Korg	DDM-110	Switchable	48	
Korg	DDM-220	Switchable	48	
Korg	SQ-64	Out only	4/12/24/48	Provided over TRS connector, rate configurable on the device. Sync in does not support run/stop.
MAM	SQ-16	Out only	24	x0x style MIDI sequencer
Novation	DrumStation	Out only	24	Converts MIDI clock to DIN sync
Roland	MC-202	In and out	24	Two outputs
Roland	MC-4	Switchable	Various	
Roland	MPU-401	Out only	24	
Roland	TB-303	In only	24	The TB-303 has a switch in the DIN socket, which disables the internal clock and enables the external DIN sync. DIN Sync out can be achieved unofficially if the DIN connector is not completely inserted in the socket.
Roland	TR-606	In or out	24	The TR-606 has a switch on the back which selects DIN sync IN or DIN sync OUT.
Roland	TR-707 / TR-727	Out only	24	The TR-707 may even convert MIDI to DIN sync in certain modes
Roland	TR-808	In and out	24	The TR-808 has a switch on the back which selects DIN sync IN or DIN sync OUT.
Roland	TR-909	In only	24	
Roland	CR-8000	In and out	24	
Roland	CSQ-600	Out only	12	Also provides a special CSQ-Clock and clock for the CR-78 (12 PPQN)
Roland	JSQ-60	Out only (2x)	24	
Roland	Jupiter-8	In only	12	For synchronizing arpeggio
Roland	MSQ-100	In and out	24	
Roland	MSQ-700	In and out	24	
Roland	SBX-1	In and out	24	
Sequentix	P3	Out only	24	MIDI Sync Out can be modified to output DIN sync24
Sequentix	Cirklon	Out only	24/48	Use SYNC port
Sim'n Tonic	Midronome	Out only	1-24	MIDI Master Clock with sync24 output – older model
Sim'n Tonic	Nome II	Out only	1-24	MIDI Master Clock with sync24 output
STG Soundlabs	Time Suite	In only	24	
Synthstrom Audible	Deluge	In and out	Various	Trigger in via 3.5mm tip; trigger out on Gates 3 and 4 for start/stop and clock, respectively.
Tama	TSQ-1000	Switchable		This is a trigger sequencer which provides six trigger tracks.

Note that sync48 devices can be combined with sync24 devices if 32nd notes are programmed instead of 16th notes.
