= Novation X-Station =

Synthesizer released in 2004

X-Station
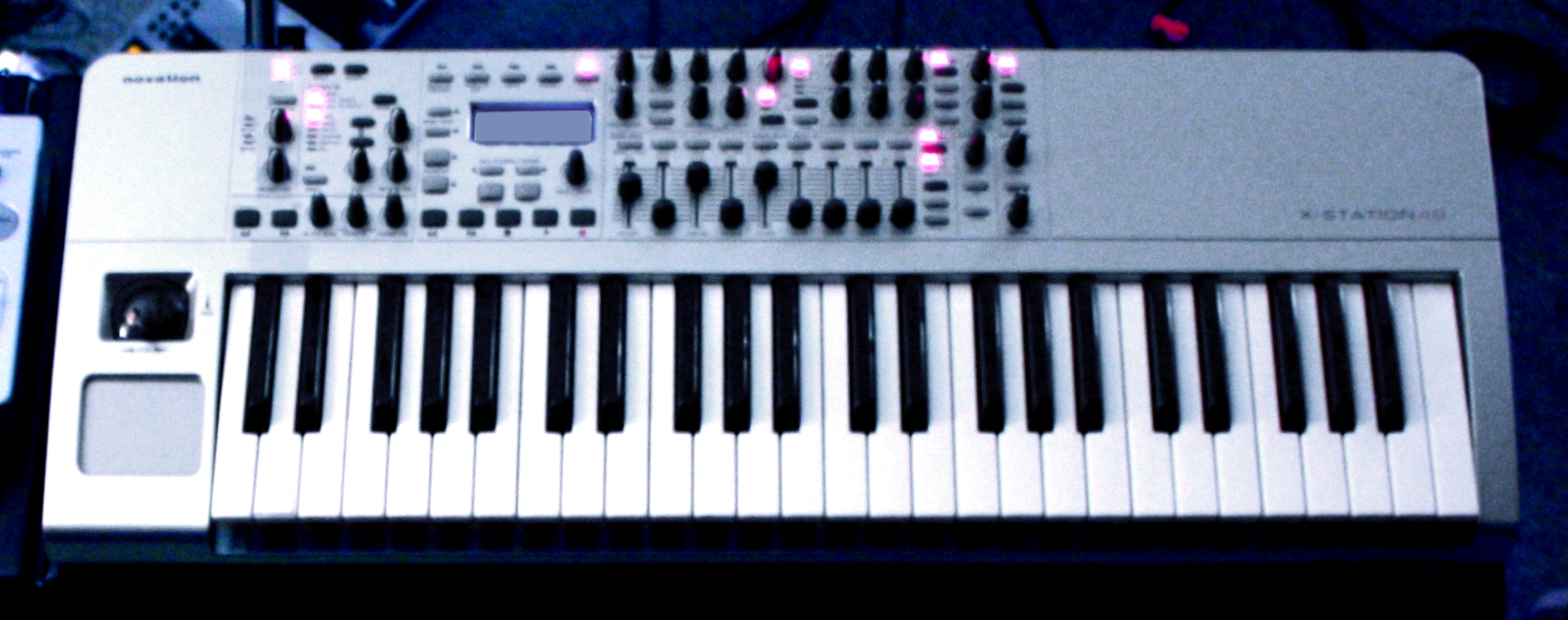
- Novation X-Station 49 Keyboard
- Manufacturer: Novation
- Dates: 2004 - 2009

Technical specifications
- Polyphony: 8 voices
- Timbrality: Monotimbral
- Oscillator: 3 oscillators per voice, 17 waveforms each (Sine/Triangle/Sawtooth/Square/White Noise/HP, BP, HBP Noise/Organ/Harpsiord/ElecPiano/Slap Bass/RhodPiano/RhodTine/Whurly EP/Clavinet/Analog Bass)
- LFO: Sine/Triangle/Saw/Square/Sample & Hold/Sample & Hold/Quantize/Random 24 Intricate Wavetables
- Synthesis type: Virtual analog subtractive synthesis, FM-synthesis
- Filter: 2 resonant 12/24 db low/high/bandpass
- Attenuator: 1 ADSR
- Aftertouch expression: Yes
- Storage memory: 200 patches
- Effects: Distortion, reverb, chorus, flange, phaser, delay, compression, 3-band EQ, usable on synth and audio I/O

Input/output
- Keyboard: 25 / 49 / 61 keys velocity = Yes
- External control: MIDI, USB, sustain and expression pedals

The Novation X-Station is a virtual analog synthesizer, audio interface and MIDI controller that was released in early 2004, and made by the British company Novation. It is the end-result of adding an audio interface, a KS-class synthesizer and an effects section to the company's ReMOTE controllers. The product was sold for a short time under the name ReMOTE Audio, before being re-branded as the X-Station. Functionally there are no differences between the two, apart from the software, that can be updated through a USB connection, at . It came in three variants : 25, 49 and 61 keys (2,4 and 5 octaves, respectively).

The Novation X-Station uses a unique process that manipulates algorithms, called "Liquid Analogue Sound Modelling" a technique that mimics the subtle distortions introduced at the filter stage by analog synthesis, originally developed by Novation for their classic synth, the Supernova. You could call the synthesizer of the X-Station "Supernova Light".

The audio interface is 24 bits, with 2 phantom powered XLR/Jack inputs, and S/PDIF out. It also has an assignable 'Xpression' pad and spring-loaded X/Y joystick. The X-Station can be powered by USB, rechargeable batteries, or power adaptor.

The Novation X-Station was discontinued May, 2009.
