= Novation DrumStation =

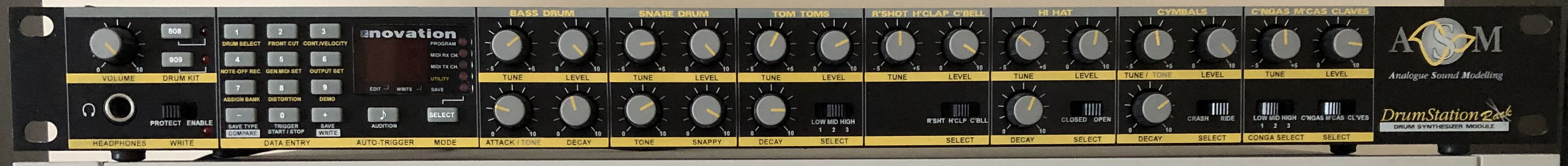
A Novation DrumStation, version 1 (yellow)

The Novation DrumStation is a 1U rackmount "analog modelling" digital drum machine by Novation Digital Music Systems. It emulates the sounds of the Roland TR-808 and Roland TR-909, although it lacks the step sequencers of the originals, instead receiving notes via MIDI.

One of its notable characteristics is its DIN sync connector, allowing synchronisation of older equipment such as the Roland TB-303.

== Notable users ==
- Mike Banks
- Laurent Garnier
- Massive Attack

== Editors ==
- Edisyn
