= Novation Supernova =

Synthesizer released in 1998 and discontinued in 2000

SuperNova
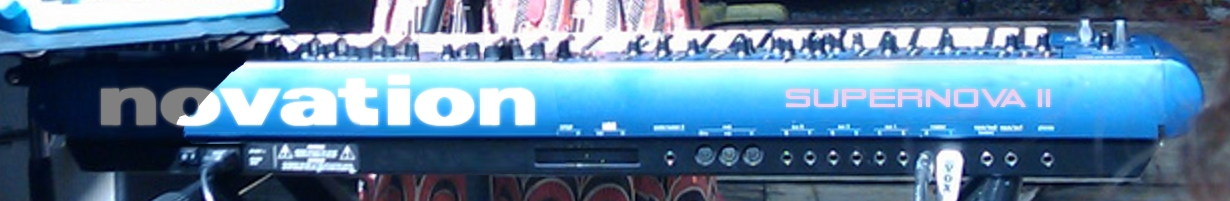
- Novation SuperNova II (rear)
- Manufacturer: Novation
- Dates: 1998 - 2000

Technical specifications
- Polyphony: SuperNova: 16 voices (expandable to 32); SuperNova II: 24 voices (expandable to 48)
- Timbrality: 8
- Oscillator: 3 oscillators per voice, (saw, variable width square)
- LFO: 2 saw, square, tri, sample/hold
- Synthesis type: Virtual analog Subtractive
- Filter: 1 resonant 12/18/24 db low/high/bandpass
- Attenuator: 1 ADSR
- Aftertouch expression: n/a
- Velocity expression: n/a
- Storage memory: 512 (expandable to 1,024) patches; 256 performances
- Effects: Distortion, reverb, chorus, flange, phaser, delay, pan, tremolo, 2-band EQ, comb filtering

Input/output
- External control: MIDI

The Novation SuperNova, released in 1998, was a 3U rack-mounted virtual analogue polyphonic synthesizer with 16+ note polyphony and multitimbral operation, made by the British company Novation. Unique to the Supernova was the addition of multiple effects options which were retained per part in multi-timbral use, allowing a much richer sound than had generally been possible with a multitimbral synthesizer. The SuperNova and its successor, the SuperNova II, have been used by a wide range of artists including Orbital, ATB, The Faint, Ozric Tentacles, Sin, Jean-Michel Jarre and A Guy Called Gerald.

== Overview ==
The Novation SuperNova was first produced in 1998 in the midst of a highly competitive virtual analogue synthesizer market to compete with the Roland JP-8000, the Clavia Nord Lead, the Korg Prophecy, the Yamaha AN1x, and the Access Virus, among others. It offers many of the same features as its competitors, such as accurate digital imitations of analogue subtractive synthesizer architecture and a resonant (self-oscillating) filter, as well as having the MIDI functionality of a modern synth.

Some key differences however are: it featured no triangle or sine wave (simpler waves such as these had to be arrived at using a unique hardness attenuator by softening either the saw or square), its polyphony and multitimbrality were superior to its competitors, and it had an extremely powerful effects engine that could provide 7 simultaneous effects for each part with no loss of polyphony. At the time, the SuperNova's effects engine greatly surpassed all other synths and was considered a key element in the instrument's sound.

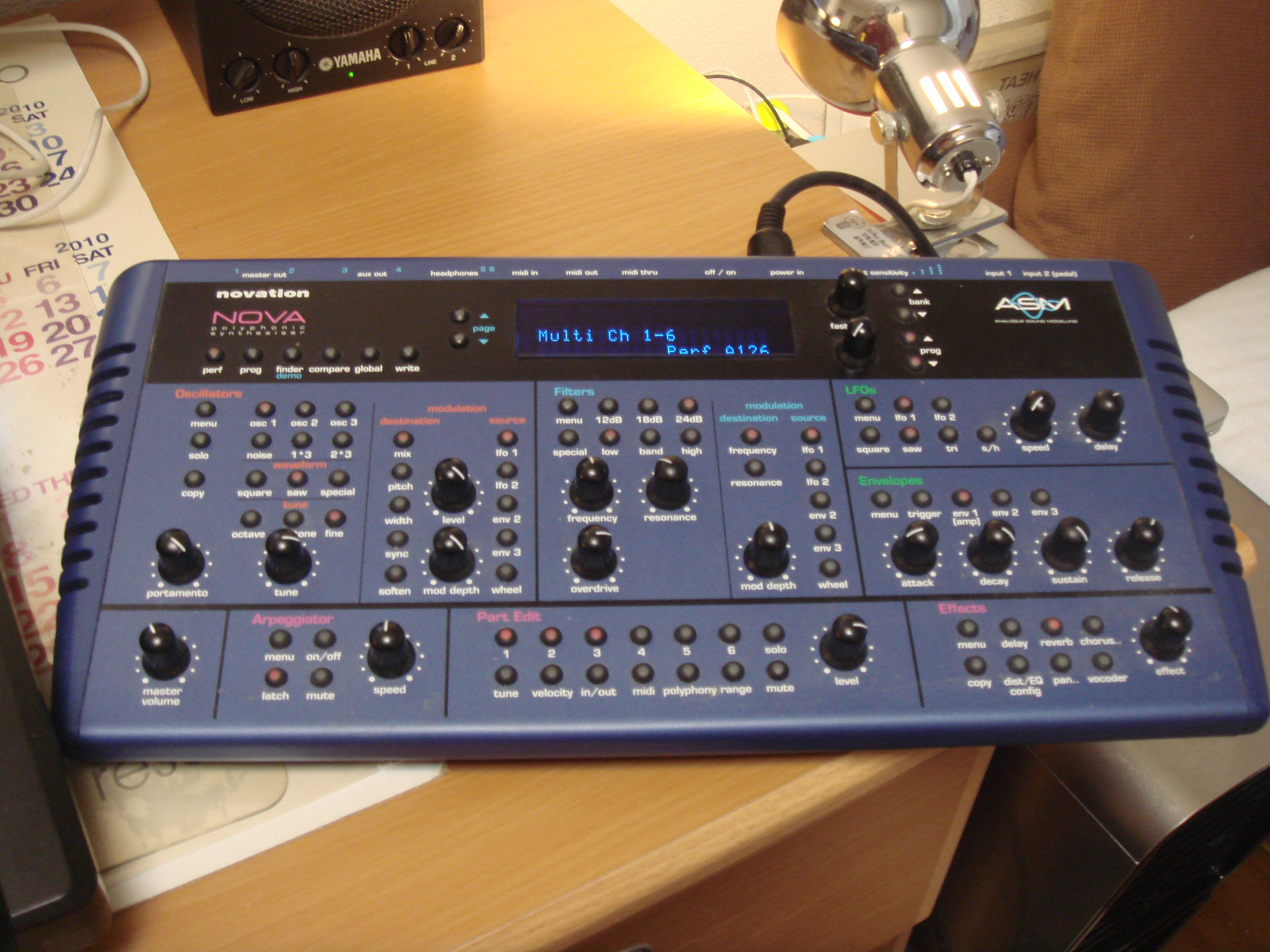
Novation Nova

In 2000, Novation released the Nova synthesizer module (US$1,499 in 2000). It was a small, desktop, less powerful version of the Supernova, with the notable addition of a 40-band vocoder

The SuperNova II (2000) was available in 24, 36 and 48-voice models with additional 12 or 24-voice expansion boards. Available again in a 3U rack-mount format, the SuperNova II was also available in a 61-note performance keyboard version with velocity and aftertouch, enabling sound tweaking during live performance. FM synthesis capability was included along with ring modulation, dual analogue inputs and a 42-band vocoder. An 8-part arpeggiator was also on-board and in its full version the product offered 8-part multitimbrality and 48-voice polyphony, with 57 and 2304 oscillators running simultaneously. A smaller version, the Nova II, was also available in 16, 24 and 36-voice models, with a 49-note keyboard and less physical controls.

In 2001, Novation published a free OS update that added more features to the original Supernova series, including a Double Saw wave form and nine dual filter modes. Moreover, the new OS offered a partial compatibility with Supernova II series, via system exclusive dumps.

The Supernova II was discontinued in 2001.

In March 2018, British company Sector101 began selling a clone of the 24 voice expansion board for the SuperNova II and Nova II.
