= JoMoX =

German company

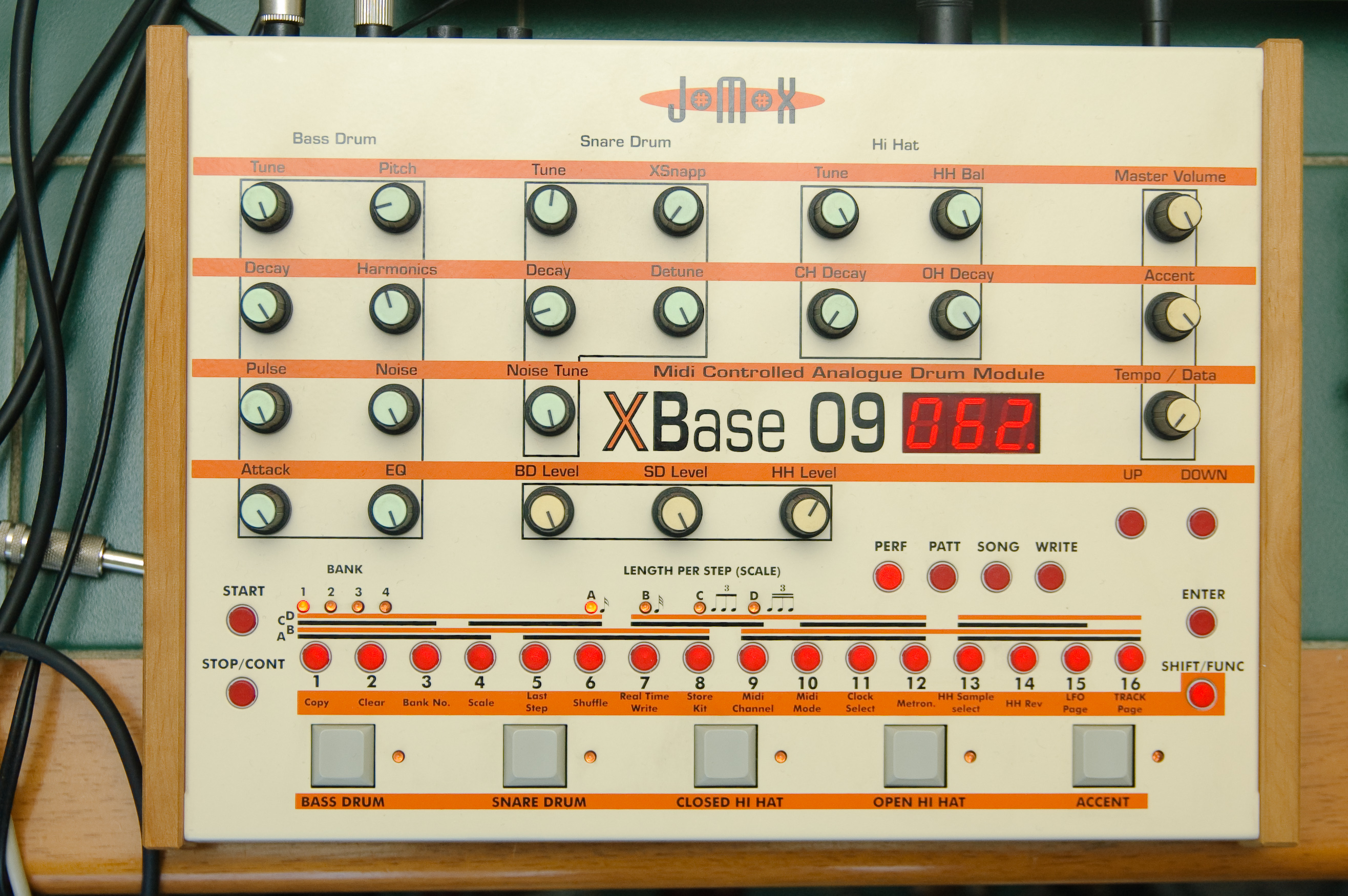
JoMoX XBase 09, MIDI controlled analog drum module

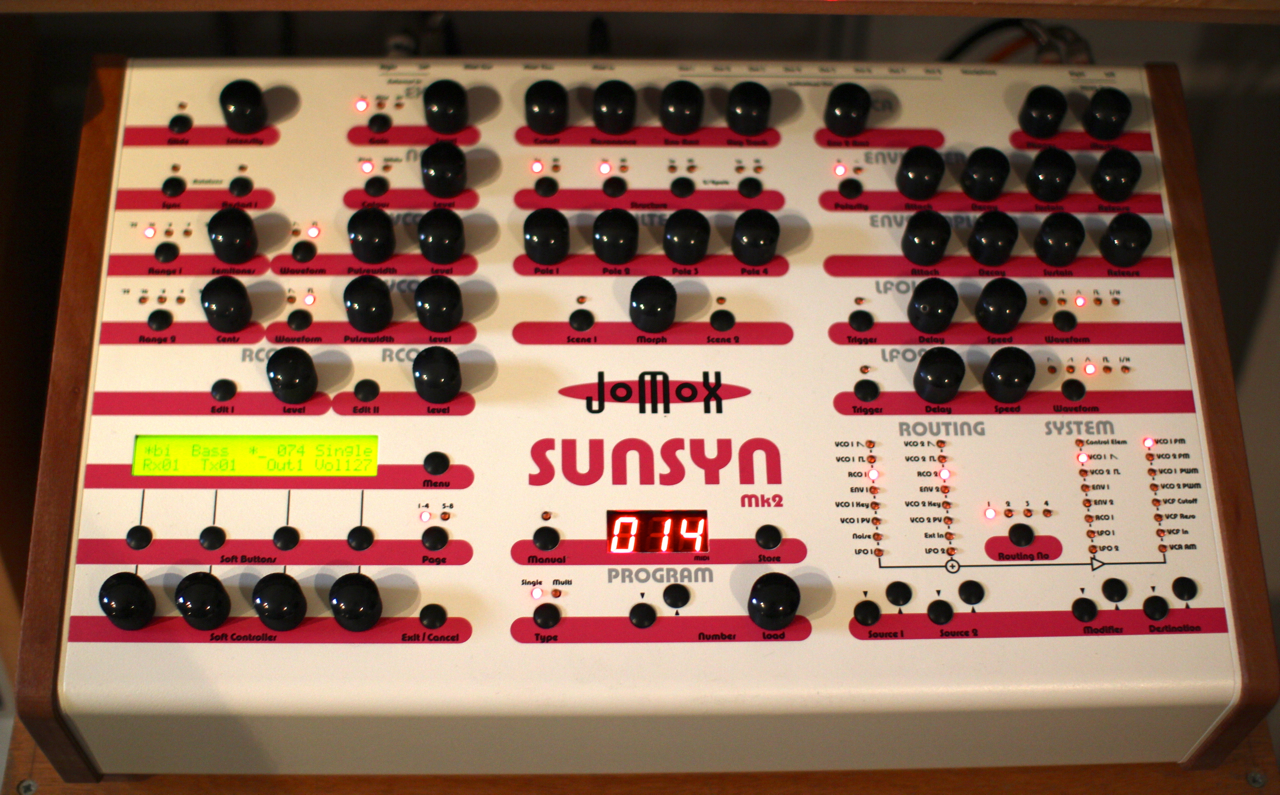
JoMoX SunSyn Mk2, 8-voice analog synthesizer

JoMoX Elektronische Musikinstrumente GmbH is a German electronic musical instrument manufacturer founded in 1997, and based in Berlin.

Jürgen Michaelis is the CEO and the product developer. The company specializes in analog synthesizers.

The XBase 09 was the first product offered from JoMoX, and it continues to be the most requested device from the production line.

== Products ==
=== Current products ===
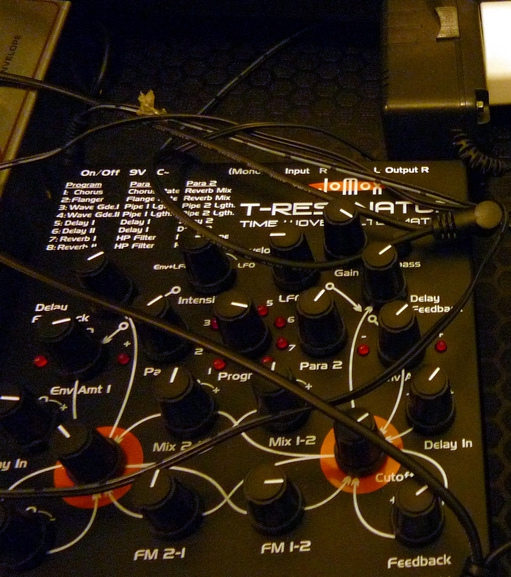
JoMoX T-Resonator

- Alpha Base - analog drum synthesizer and drum machine, with analog instruments (Kick drum, MBrane), sample capabilities, 6 hybrid samples channels (that are processed through analog VCA and VCF), 2 channels of pure digital samples + 1 FM synth. LFOs, reverb and delay
- M.Brane11 - analog percussion synthesizer
- MBase 11 - kick drum synthesizer, sequel to MBase01
- T-Resonator - filter with digital stereo delay integrated into the feedback loops
- MBase01 - kick drum analog synthesizer
- Resonator Neuronium - experimental analog neural network synthesizer
- M-Resonator - filter based on the Resonator Neuronium idea

=== Discontinued products ===
- XBASE 888 - Analog drum synthesizer and drum machine identical to XBASE 999, minus the X-Filter
- SunSyn Mk2 - 8-voice true analog synthesizer
- Midi-to-CV Interfaces - old MIDI interfaces 1994-1996
- MoonWind - Analog stereo filter tracker
- SunSyn - 8 voice polyphonic multitimbral true analog synthesizer. JoMoX's first major analog synthesizer.
- XBASE 999 - Analog drum synthesizer and drum machine with downloadable percussion samples and assignable analog stereo multimode filter with LFOs
- AiRBase99 - A 1U drum module based on the XBase09 with additional features
- JaZBase03 - Alternative to AirBase99
- XBase09 - Emulator of TR-909 with its sequencer qualities plus additional features

== See also ==
- Roland TR-808
- Roland TR-909

Note: XBASE 888 and XBASE 999 are considered clones of the TR-808 and TR-909
