= Roland TR-707 =

Drum machine

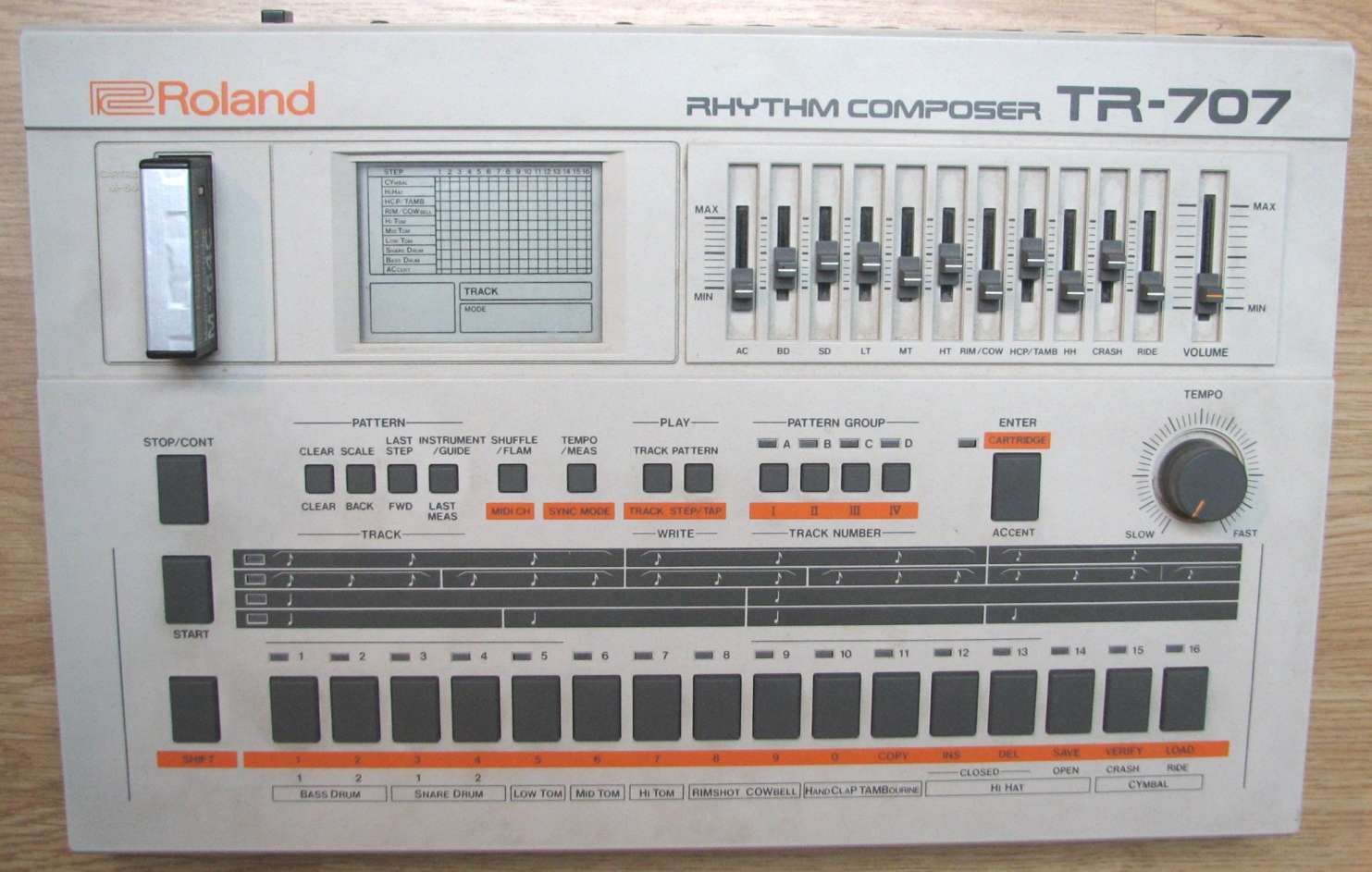
- Roland TR-707 Rhythm Composer
- Manufacturer: Roland
- Dates: 1985

Technical specifications
- Polyphony: 10 notes
- Synthesis type: Sample-based
- Storage memory: 64 Patterns, 4 Songs

Input/output
- External control: MIDI In Out & DIN Sync In Out & Trig Out (outputs a Rimshot sound as trigger)

The Roland TR-707 Rhythm Composer is a drum machine released by Roland Corporation in 1985. Later in 1985, Roland released the TR-727, a model with sounds sampled from Latin percussion.

== Features ==
The TR-707 was the first Roland drum machine to exclusively use sampled sounds. It also added an LCD screen displaying information such as programming data, tempo, measure, and the MIDI channel.

The sounds comprise two bass drums, two snares, three toms, rimshot, cowbell, clap, crash cymbal, ride cymbal and hi-hat (open and closed), tambourine, handclap. The sounds cannot be tuned. It is smaller and lighter than its predecessor, the TR-909.

The TR-707 provides four levels of shuffle that operate globally on the rhythm, as well as flam that can be applied to any step. The device offers 64 programmable patterns, which are editable via step-write or tap-write, that can be sequenced together into any of four different tracks. Patterns and tracks can be stored on the device (providing that two AA batteries are inserted) or onto an optional memory cartridge with twice the capacity.

The TR-707 is particularly sought after by users of Roland gear from the same era because it can synchronize with other hardware via both MIDI and DIN sync, although it cannot do so when controlled by other hardware. There is also an output that allows the Rimshot to trigger hardware that accepts a voltage pulse. There are individual volume sliders and output jacks for each instrument group.

== Architecture ==
While the TR-707 is a primarily digital device, it still employs some analog circuitry like envelopes and amplifiers.

The sounds where envelope circuits are used to contour the sounds are the Crash and Ride Cymbal, and the Hi-Hats. The Crash and Ride Cymbals are stored and replayed at 6-bit resolution whereas the other sounds are 8-bit samples. This low bit resolution significantly alters the dynamics of the original sounds resulting in very compressed sounds with an unnaturally long sustain.

Comparison of the Cymbal samples stored on the ROM and the Cymbal sounds you hear after they have gone through D/A conversion, envelopes, and amplification.

These envelopes also play a role in reducing the quantization noise introduced by the low bit-depth used in the TR-707's circuits, particularly during the decay portion of sounds.

With the introduction of a 707/727 sound set for the Roland TR-8, Roland published an in-depth explanation of what causes a TR-707 unit to behave differently than a set of sampled sounds from the machine.

== Legacy ==
The TR-707 was a staple in early house music, particularly with acid house. It is also a staple of almost all electronically produced Arabic pop music (al jeel). The TR-707 only offers a limited number of instruments sampled at 8 bits, but it is still in use because of its versatility in synchronizing with other hardware and its fully featured interface, comparable to that of high-end Roland drum machines such as the TR-808 and TR-909.

In 1985, Roland released the TR-727, a model of the TR-707 with sounds sampled from Latin percussion. The TR-505 contains a subset of samples selected from the 707 and 727.

Songs that use the TR-707 include "Need You Tonight" by INXS, ''Move Your Body" by Marshall Jefferson and "Washing Machine" by Mr. Fingers.
