= Roland TR-505 =

Drum machine

TR-505
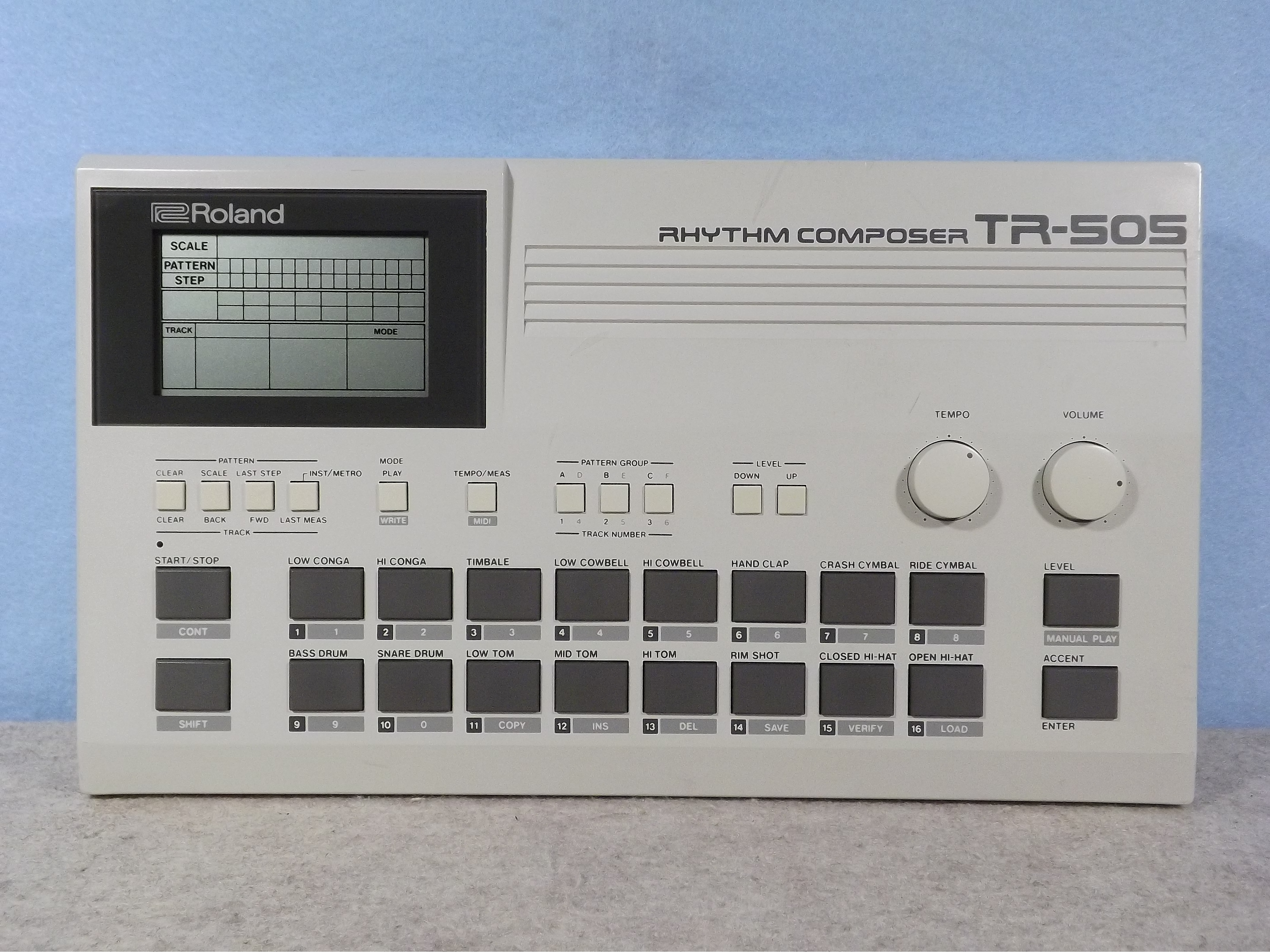
- The Roland TR-505
- Manufacturer: Roland Corporation
- Dates: 1986–1991
- Price: $318 US (1986)

Technical specifications
- Polyphony: 8 voices
- Oscillator: N/A
- Synthesis type: Digital sample-based
- Aftertouch expression: No
- Velocity expression: No
- Storage memory: Patterns: 48 user, 48 preset. 6 Songs.
- Effects: No
- Hardware: Main panel features a simple LCD, 15 buttons, 2 knobs, 16 trigger pads, 2 outputs for left and right/mono, headphone jack, and tape input/output.

Input/output
- Keyboard: 16 pattern keys
- External control: MIDI in/out, start/stop foot pedal jack.
- Audio sample: 8-bit unsigned PCM data, with a 25.00 kHz sampling rate

The Roland TR-505 Rhythm Composer is a drum machine and MIDI sequencer released by Roland Corporation in 1986. It hails from the same family of drum machines as the Roland TR-909, TR-808, TR-707, TR-626 and TR-606. The drum kit includes basic rock drum sounds similar to those of the TR-707, plus a complement of Latin-style drum sounds similar to the TR-727.

== Voice synthesis ==
Samples in the TR-505 are stored as 8-bit unsigned PCM waveforms at a sample rate of 25 kHz. The TR-505 offers some major improvements over the TR-707, including 16 digitally recorded PCM drum sounds (four more than the TR-707) and five Latin percussion voices from the TR-727, reducing the need to buy a separate unit or PCM card.

Summary of drum voices:

Low conga	Hi conga	Timbale	Low cowbell	Hi cowbell	Clap	Crash	Ride
Kick	Snare	Low tom	Mid tom	Hi tom	Rimshot / sidestick	Closed hi-hat	Open hi-hat

Although there are 16 drum samples, the TR-505 only has an 8-voice polyphony, restricting some sounds from playing simultaneously: low conga or hi conga; timbale, low tom, mid tom, or hi tom; low cowbell or hi cowbell; hand clap or rim shot; crash cymbal or ride cymbal; closed hi-hat or open hi-hat.

The TR-505 offers very limited voice editing in the form of volume, velocity, MIDI channel, and MIDI note of each voice as a global parameter.

== Sequencer ==
The TR-505 contains 48 factory sequencer patterns, organized into 3 pattern groups (A, B, and C). The drum machine can also store 48 user created sequencer patterns, organized into 3 pattern groups (D, E, and F).

The TR-505 features five basic modes, including the following:

- Track play - plays whole tracks (arrangements of patterns to form songs).
- Track write - sequence patterns into tracks.
- Step write - sequence patterns by stepping through each position in the pattern.
- Tap write - sequence patterns by tapping drums sounds in real time.
- Real time - play patterns in real time by tapping the pads.

An accent can be applied to any position in a pattern and will affect all instruments triggered at that position by increasing output volume.

Users can copy, insert, or delete one or more steps in any given pattern, and copy, insert, or delete patterns anywhere in a track (song).

Each individual pattern is a single measure long, The default time signature is 4/4 consisting of 16 steps and quarter note scale, resulting in each step representing a sixteenth note. Other time signatures can be programmed by changing the Last Step (length of patterns) and the scale, allowing for shuffle and swing rhythms.

Two or more patterns can be combined, using pattern chaining, to play as a single pattern. Each pattern in the chain occupies a pad, but it will only trigger the chain as a whole, not the individual pattern.

Up to six tracks (songs) can be programmed using combinations of patterns. Each song can consist of up to 423 bars (patterns).

== Keyboard and external control ==
The TR-505 consists of 16 individual instrument/ pattern pads. The pads are not velocity sensitive, but can be modified by the accent parameter.

The TR-505 can transmit and receive on MIDI channels 1 through 16 and Notes numbers 25 to 99. It also contains a MIDI Omni mode allowing it to receive all MIDI data. The TR-505 responds to the following MIDI messages:

- Key message - trigger signal for the individual voice.
- Velocity message - Note-on velocity is both transmitted and received allowing more expressive.
- Track number message - track/song select
- Bar Number message - Song position
- Clock message - tempo synchronization, start, stop, etc..

== Storage ==
The TR-505 can store 48 ROM patterns, 48 RAM patterns, 6 tracks, and a maximum of 423 measures.

The Tape interface (in/out) allow the Tracks and Patterns in internal memory to be stored on external tape. Data can be Saved, Verified, and Loaded from the tape.

== Modifications ==
There are companies, websites, and magazine articles documenting a DIY process for circuit bending and modifying the factory setting of the Roland TR-505. An example of a few modifications include changing audio samples, voice circuit bending, adding individual audio outputs, adding CV outputs, adding pitch change to each voice, and adding circuits to randomize sequences.
