= Novation Digital Music Systems =

British musical equipment manufacturer

Novation Music
- Industry: Electronics
- Founded: 1992; 34 years ago (as Novation Electronic Music Systems)
- Headquarters: Focusrite Audio Engineering Ltd., Artisan, Hillbottom Road, High Wycombe, Bucks HP12 4HJ, United Kingdom.
- Key people: Chris Huggett
- Products: Keyboards, Synthesisers, MIDI Controllers, Grooveboxes
- Parent: a Division of Focusrite Audio Engineering Ltd
- Website: www.novationmusic.com

Novation Music is a British musical equipment manufacturer, founded in 1992 by Ian Jannaway and Mark Thompson as Novation Electronic Music Systems. Today the company specialises in MIDI controllers with and without keyboards, both analogue and virtual analogue synthesisers, grid-based performance controllers, and grooveboxes.

== History ==
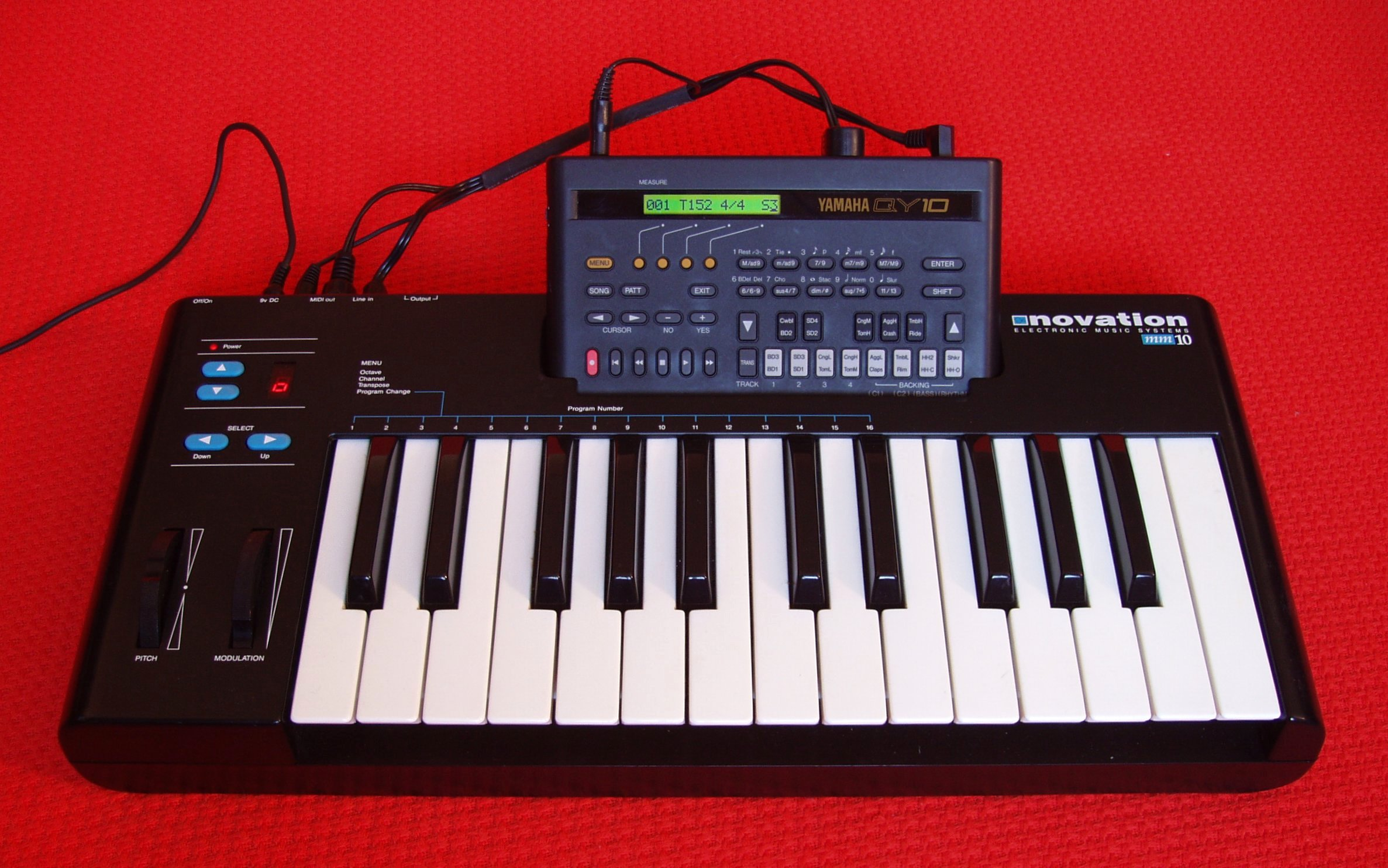
MM10 (1992) with Yamaha QY10

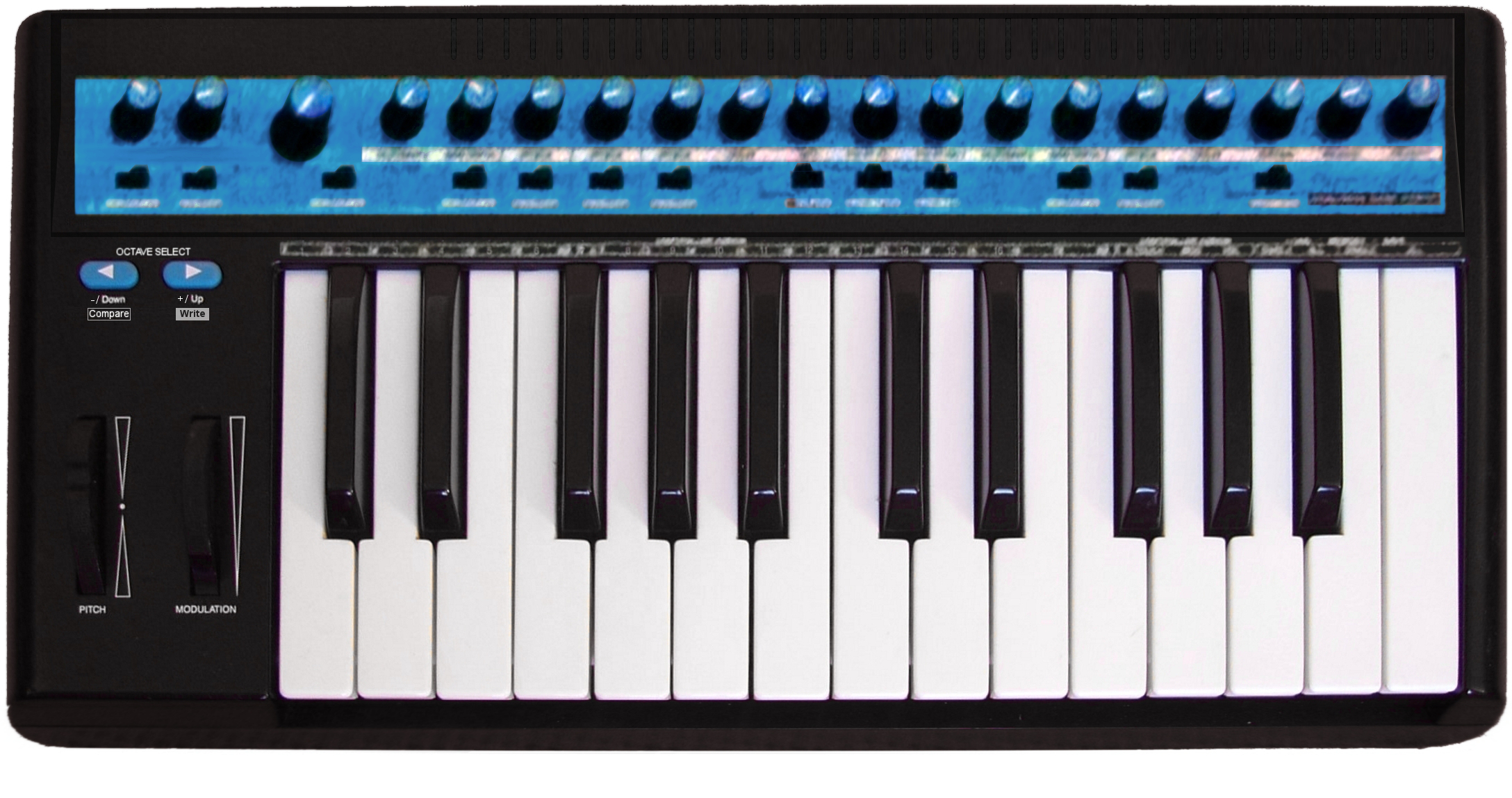
Bass Station (1993)

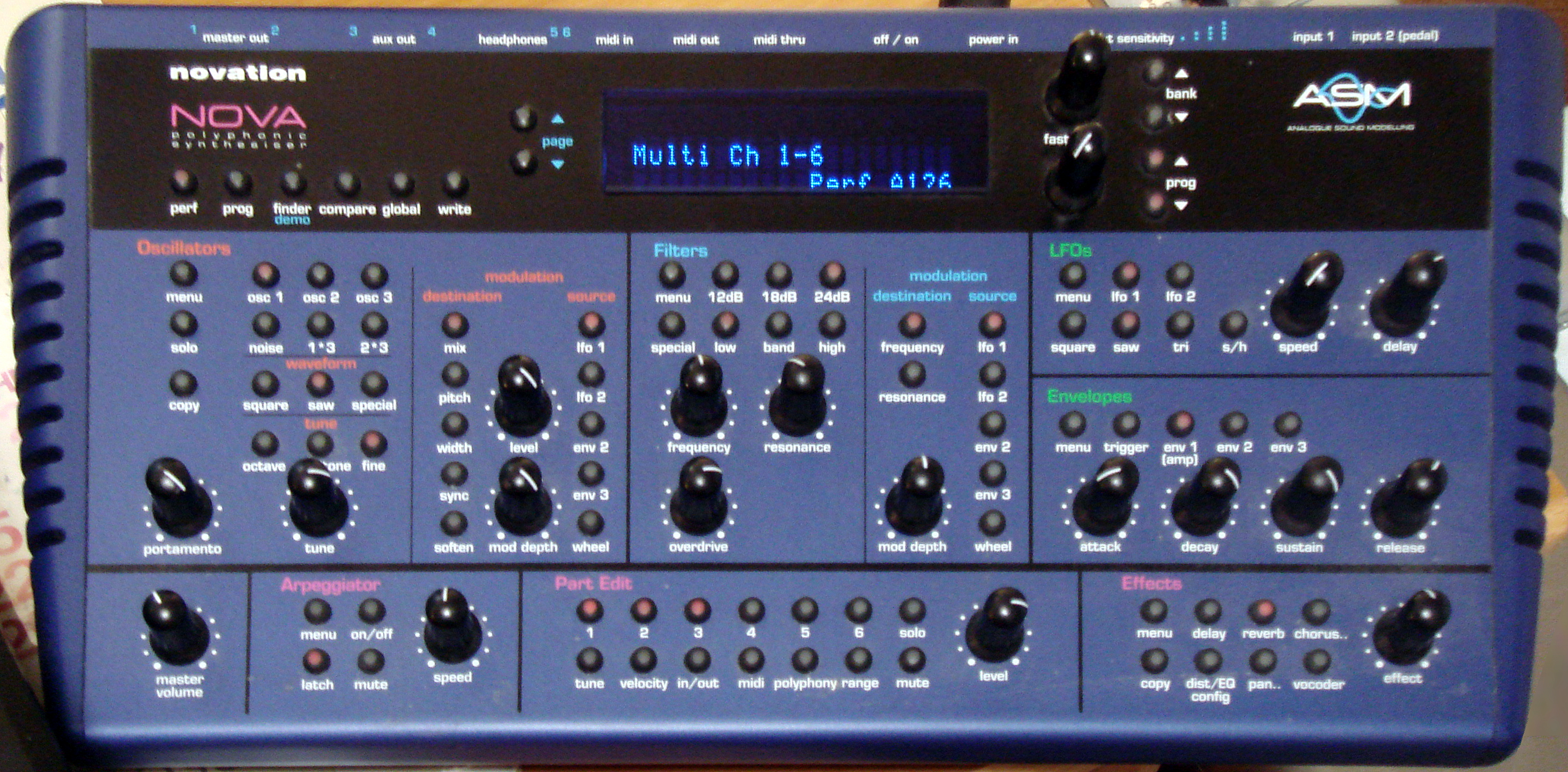
Nova (1999)

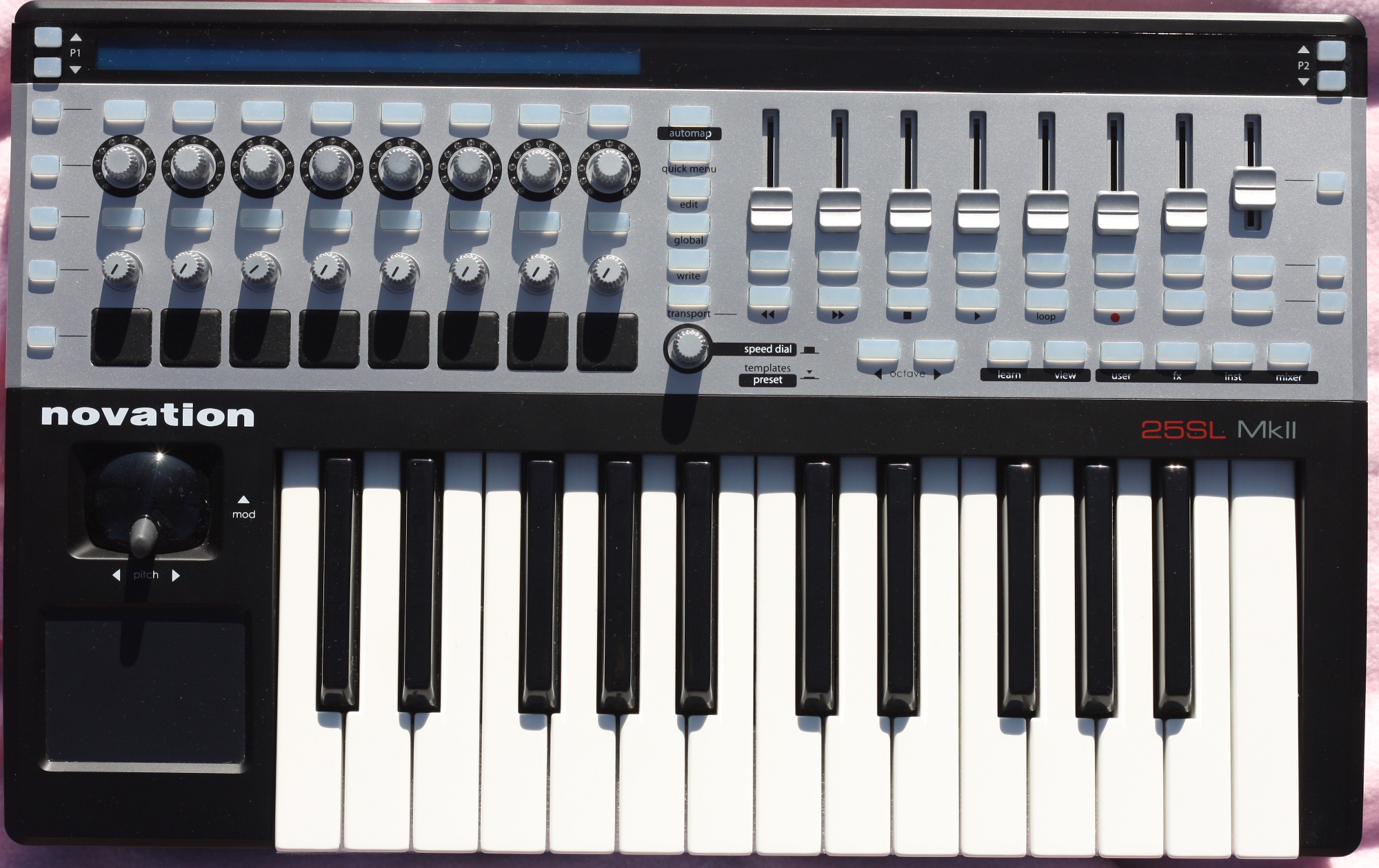
Novation 25SL MkII (2012)

Novation's first commercial product, released in 1992, was the Novation MM10, a portable battery-operated keyboard controller with full-sized keys, designed to operate with the Yamaha QY10 music workstation. It was based on a device called the MidiCon, which was never released and was the first hardware controller the company made. The MM10 combined with the QY10 arguably constituted the first completely portable modern music workstation.

In 1993 the company released the Novation Bass Station. Influenced by the Roland TB-303 Bassline, a portable compact synthesiser designed for instrumental accompaniment, the Bass Station used digitally controlled analogue oscillators (DCOs), an LFO, and a filter to replicate the sound of a traditional monophonic twin-oscillator analogue synth.

The core technology of Analogue Sound Modelling (ASM) was introduced in 1995 with the Drum Station, which modelled the Roland TR-808 and TR-909 drum machines using digitally synthesised models of the original waveforms.

Novation's first technical director was Chris Huggett, who designed the Wasp and OSCar synthesisers and wrote the operating system for the Akai S1000. While working for Akai, he gave Novation's founders advice and support, contributing to the design of the Bass Station and Drum Station – the former featured both the filter and amplifier Huggett had designed for the EDP Wasp – and joining full-time in the mid-1990s to design the Novation Supernova. He was a consultant to the company and was involved in the design of many of the company's products, until his death in October 2020.

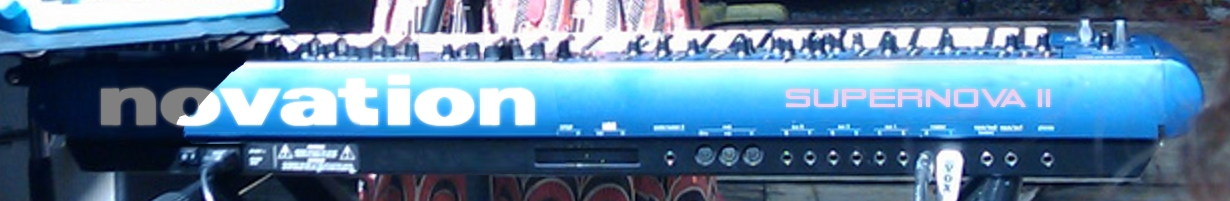
Supernova II (2000) rear panel

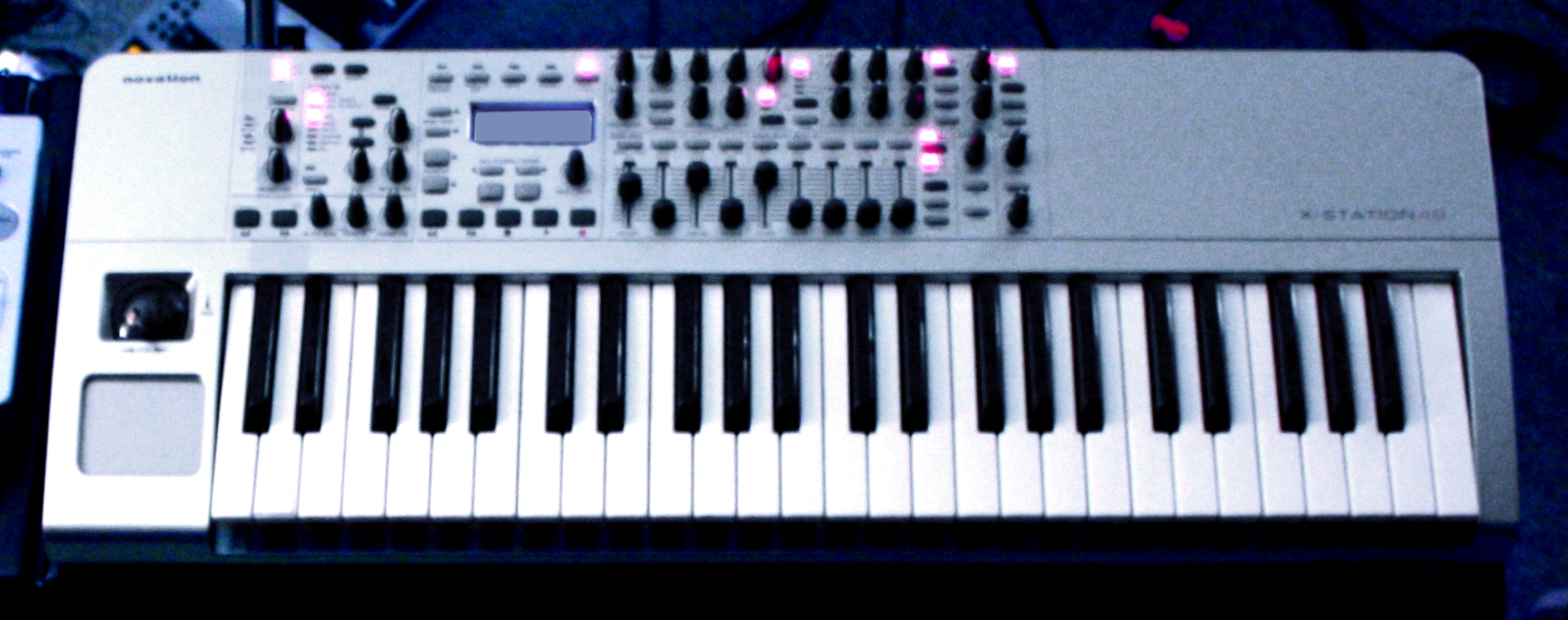
X-Station 49 (2004)

Supernova, released in 1998, was a 3U rack-mounted polyphonic synthesiser with 16+ note polyphony and multitimbral operation, an important feature being the provision of multiple effects units which could be assigned to each timbre, allowing a much richer sound than had generally been possible with a multitimbral synthesiser. Supernova and its successor, SuperNova II, have been used by a wide range of artists including Orbital, ATB, The Faint, Sin, Jean Michel Jarre and A Guy Called Gerald.

Having produced controllers since the beginning and synthesisers from the early days, the company added USB-based computer audio interfaces and in 2004 produced the X-Station, intended to provide a complete music production environment with the addition of a computer/sequencer, microphone and monitoring. This was followed by MIDI controllers featuring no keyboard at all, but instead offering varying numbers of buttons, pads, control knobs and sliders, all sending MIDI messages. With the introduction of the SL range in 2005, this was complemented by Novation Automap, a software system that automatically detects and maps the controllable parameters of a plug-in or software application and configures the control surface to address them. Automap is no longer supported.

In August 2004, Novation was acquired by Focusrite Ltd. and became a subsidiary named Novation Digital Music Systems Ltd.

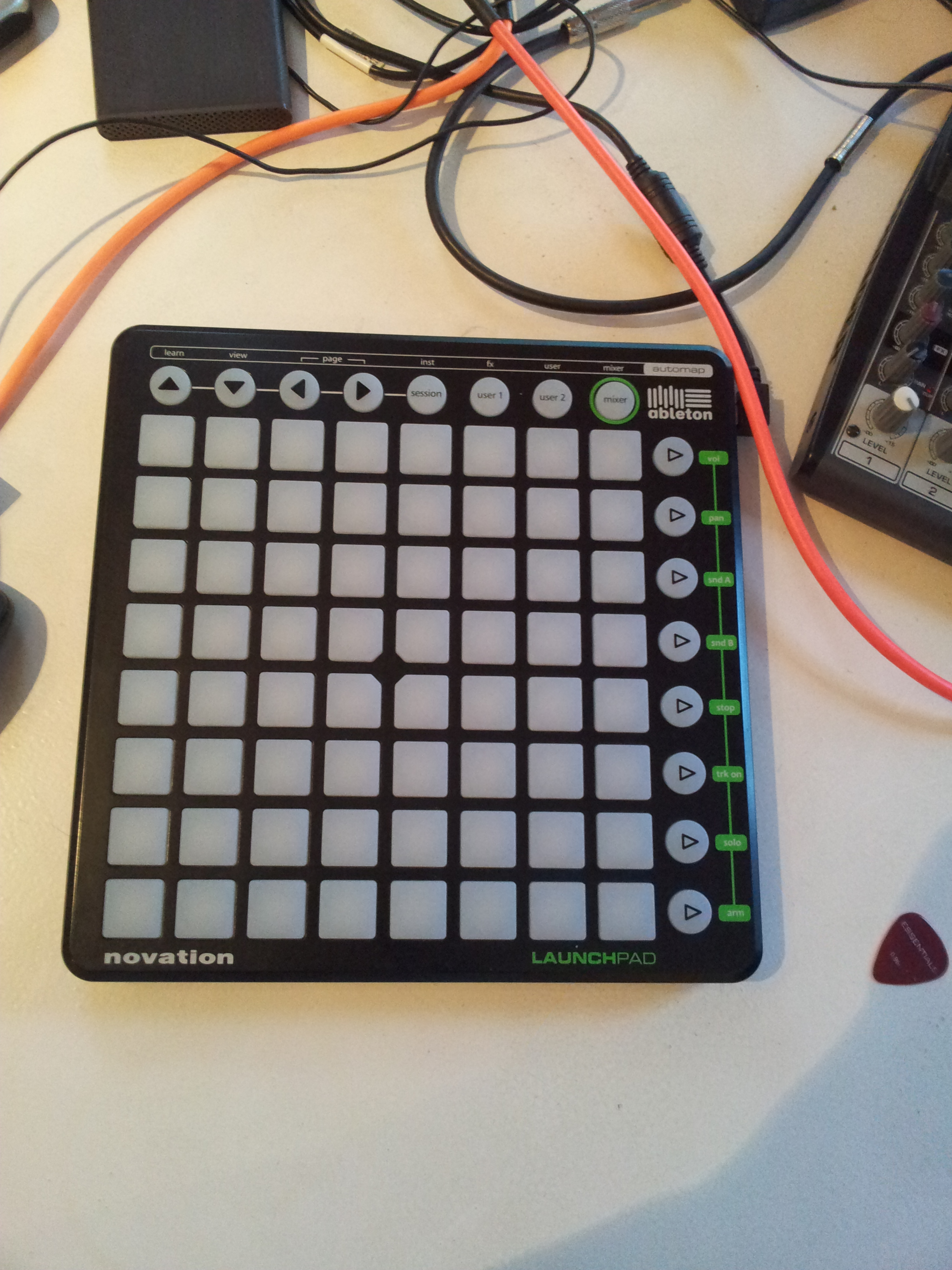
Launchpad (2009)

A keyboardless MIDI controller, the Novation Launchpad, was launched in 2009 with an 8x8 grid of large illuminated buttons that could be used to trigger sounds, loops, effects and other parameters, initially in conjunction with the Ableton Live music performance application. Launchpad was one of the first grid-based performance controllers and this area expanded over the subsequent period to become a significant aspect of the electronic music hardware market. There are currently 3 variations of the product, the Launchpad, Launchpad Pro, and Launchpad Mini. The Launchpad was out of the top two best Novation makings.

The company expanded into DJ controllers initially with the Novation Dicer in 2010, which consisted of two sets of buttons designed to be attached to a turntable or laptop, and then a full-blown DJ controller in 2011 with Novation Twitch, which differed significantly from then available devices of the type in that it used twin touch-strip controllers instead of the more common turntable emulation, providing additional control capabilities. The product has been discontinued since.

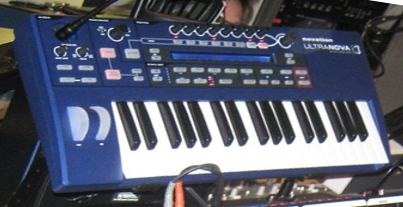
UltraNova (2010)

All these different areas of synthesis and control have increasingly combined in Novation products to create hybrid instruments and devices such as keyboard controllers with miniature grid launchers and on board synth and vocoder capability, for example the Ultranova (2011) and Mininova (2012).

In the mid-2010s, Novation introduced a new category of portable instruments aimed at standalone music-making without needing a computer. The Circuit (2015) was a compact groovebox combining a grid-based sequencer with two polyphonic synth engines and a four-part drum machine. It gained popularity for its hands-on workflow, portability and affordability, particularly among electronic and experimental musicians. The success of Circuit led to further development of the format, with follow-ups including Circuit Tracks and Circuit Rhythm in 2021, catering to sequencing and sample-based production respectively. These devices marked Novation’s growing presence in the all-in-one performance hardware space.[6]

Meanwhile, Novation returned to high-end synthesiser design with the launch of Peak (2017), a hybrid 8-voice polyphonic synth with digital oscillators and an analogue filter and distortion path. It was widely praised for its sound design capabilities and sonic character, developed in collaboration with Oxford-based synthesiser designer Chris Huggett, who had been instrumental in Novation’s early products. In 2019, Novation released Summit, an extended 16-voice bi-timbral version of Peak with a full-sized keyboard and performance controls. These instruments helped re-establish Novation as a serious name in the professional synthesiser market.[7]

Throughout the 2020s, Novation continued to refine its controller range with products like the Launchkey [MK3] series and the FLkey range, the latter tailored specifically for FL Studio integration. In 2020, the company released the AFX Station, a special edition of the Bass Station II developed in collaboration with Aphex Twin, featuring a unique sound mode and styling. The flagship SL MkIII controller combined advanced MIDI control, CV/gate outputs, and a built-in sequencer for hybrid setups. As of the mid-2020s, Novation remains a major force in both hardware controller design and compact, accessible synthesisers, supporting a wide spectrum of artists from emerging bedroom producers to internationally touring electronic acts.

Novation synthesisers have been used by a range of electronic acts including Pendulum, Jean Michel Jarre, Steve Hillier of Dubstar, Orbital, Fred Again, Barry Can't Swim, Aphex Twin, and Alt-J.

In the track "Triumph" by the rap group Wu-Tang Clan, Novation is referenced by Wu-Tang member RZA.

== Key products ==
This section lists past and present key Novation products in chronological order with brief descriptions.
See also 21 Years of inNovation Novation official web site article.

=== Novation in the 1990s ===
Novation was founded in 1992 in the UK and quickly made a name with the Bass Station, a portable analogue monosynth designed to emulate classic basslines. This was followed by products like the Supernova, a powerful virtual analogue polysynth that gained popularity in professional studios. The 1990s established Novation as an innovative synth company, blending analogue-style sound with digital control.

MM10 (1992) was a battery-powered portable keyboard system for the Yamaha QY10 music workstation. Later updated as the MM10-X.

BassStation (1993: aka BassStation Keyboard) included a pair of digitally controlled analogue oscillators (DCOs) with square, pulse and sawtooth waveforms, plus an LFO with random, triangle and sawtooth waveforms, and replicated the sound of a monophonic twin-oscillator analogue synth for bass and lead lines and synth effects plus MIDI controller data.

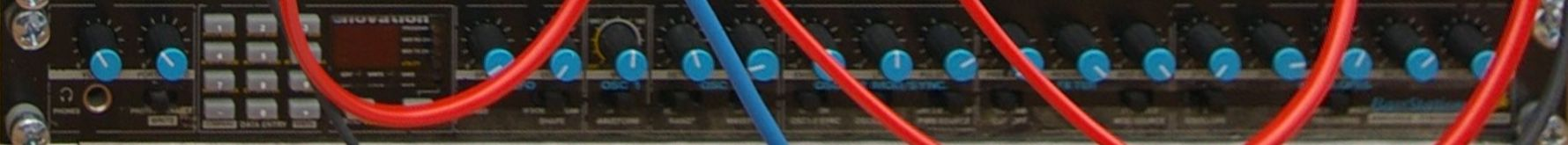
Bass Station Rack (1994)

BassStation Rack (1994) included dual ADSR envelope shapers, 12/24db per octave filter, oscillator sync, and LFO, DCOs and built-in MIDI/Control Voltage (CV) converter. Users include William Orbit, Biosphere, Massive Attack, Orbital, Apollo 440, Nine Inch Nails, Radiohead, Jimi Tenor, Laurent Garnier, ATB, Sneaker Pimps, Out of Logic and Underworld.

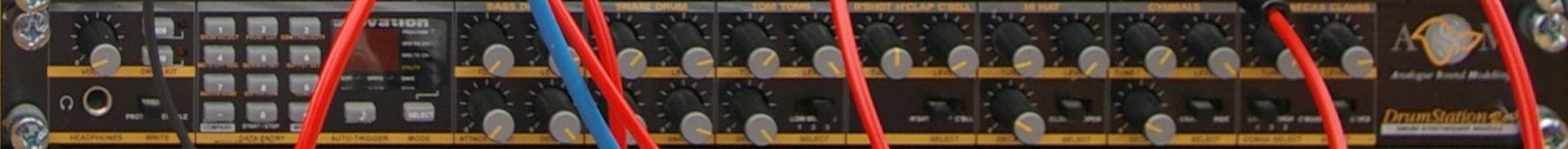
Drum Station (1995)

DrumStation (1995) used 'Analogue Sound Modelling' (ASM), DrumStation included all the sounds of the TR808 and its successor the TR909, and the same tone controls for each sound, including tone, attack, decay, tuning, 'snappiness' and distortion (depending on the sound).

Super BassStation (1997) added an arpeggiator, noise source, ring modulator, an additional LFO bringing the complement to two, a sub-oscillator (an octave below Oscillator 1), analogue chorus and distortion effects, keyboard filter tracking, stereo outputs and panning, enhanced memory, analogue trigger signal output and more to the original design.

Supernova (1998) Polyphonic synth providing a complete multi-effects processor for each of its eight audio output parts – and a total of 56 programmable effects available on all voices all the time. Supernova originally featured 16-note polyphony, later expanded to 20 with a new operating system, and three DCOs with ASM to recreate the classic analogue synth sound. A comprehensive filter provided low-, high- and bandpass filtering with 12, 18 and 24 dB/octave, with resonance and self-oscillation, plus overdrive and key tracking, where the filter tuning could follow the keyboard. Two powerful LFOs and two ring modulators completed the sound modification capabilities and the Supernova specification was rounded out with eight analogue outputs and full MIDI implementation. Supernova and its successor, Supernova II, have been used by Orbital, ATB, The Faint, Sin, Jean-Michel Jarre and A Guy Called Gerald.

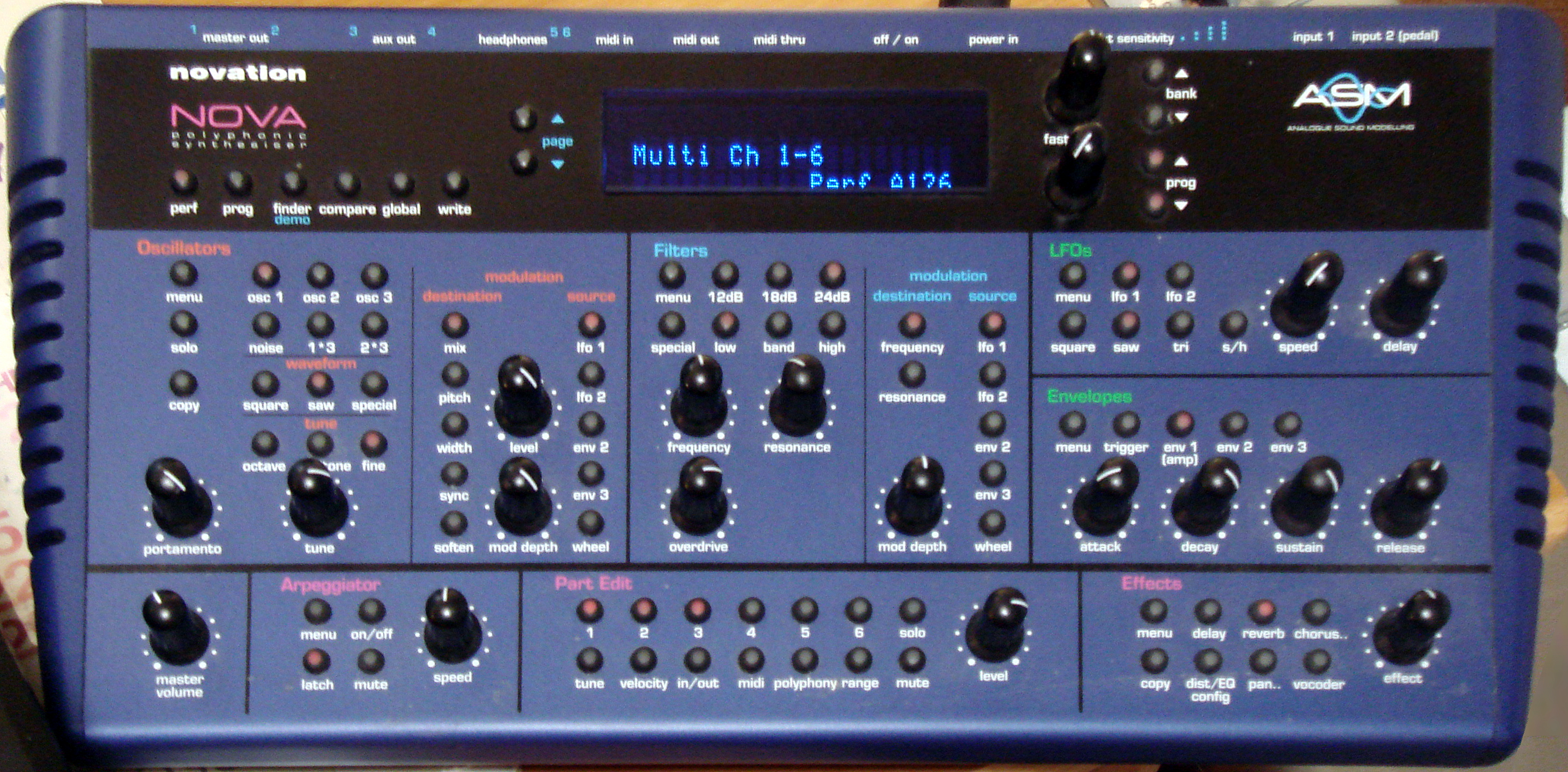
Nova (1999)

Nova (1999) essentially repackaged the Supernova into a desktop performance module based around the same synthesiser engine.

=== Novation in the 2000s ===
In the 2000s, Novation shifted towards MIDI controller development while continuing its synthesiser line. Key releases included the X-Station (a hybrid synth and audio interface) and the Remote SL, which introduced Automap software for hands-on DAW control. The company also released the Nova series, building on its virtual analogue legacy. This decade marked Novation’s move into integrated, multi-function music hardware.

Supernova II (2000) was available in 24, 36 and 48-voice models with additional 12 or 24-voice expansion boards. Available again in a 3U rack-mount format, the Supernova II was also available in a 61-note performance keyboard version with velocity and aftertouch, enabling sound tweaking during live performance. FM synthesis capability was included along with ring modulation, dual analogue inputs and a 42-band vocoder. An 8-part arpeggiator was also on board and in its full version the product offered 8-part multitimbrality and 48-voice polyphony, with 57 and 2304 oscillators running simultaneously.

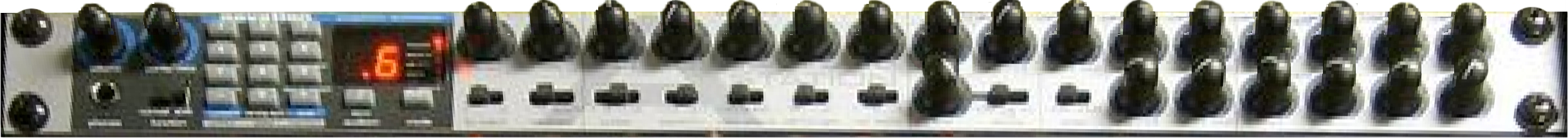
A-Station (2001)

A-Station (2001) was a cross between the BassStation and the Supernova. With voice architecture was based on the Supernova, A-Station added 8-voice polyphony and a basic FM synthesis engine, reverb and delay, plus a 12-voice vocoder for processing external sounds – which can also be used as an oscillator source and processed via filter and envelopes. An arpeggiator was also provided.

K-Station (2002) was a 2-octave keyboard version of the A-Station with 8-voice polyphony, three ASM oscillators providing a range of waveforms plus FM synthesis and a noise source, a 12-band vocoder, arpeggiator, dual ADSR envelope shapers and two LFOs, reverb and delay effects.

KS Series (2002) – KS4, KS5 and KS Rack – used enhanced versions of the K-Station engine with a range of additional features. The KS4 was a 4-octave keyboard, while the KS5 offered five octaves. Keyboards are semi-weighted and include aftertouch, and all 33 control knobs on the ergonomic control section send MIDI. The KS Series included four-part multitimbral operation with multiple assignable audio outputs, a 14 band vocoder and a separate effects processor for each part.

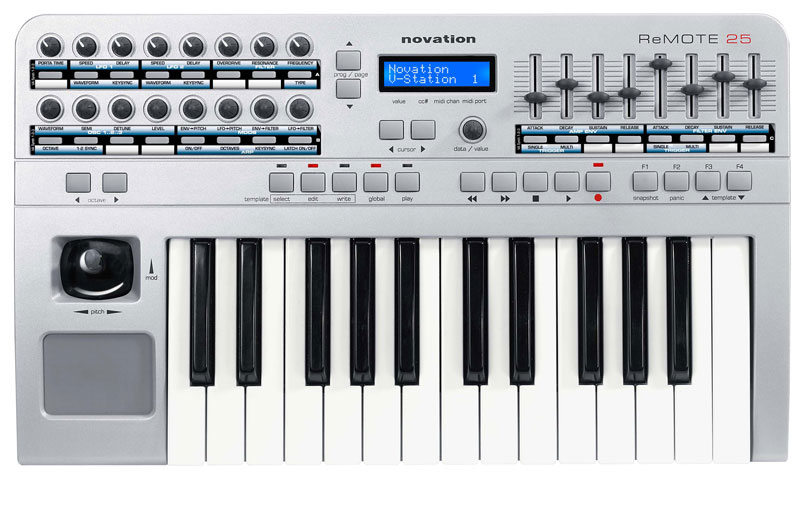
ReMOTE 25 (2003) interface

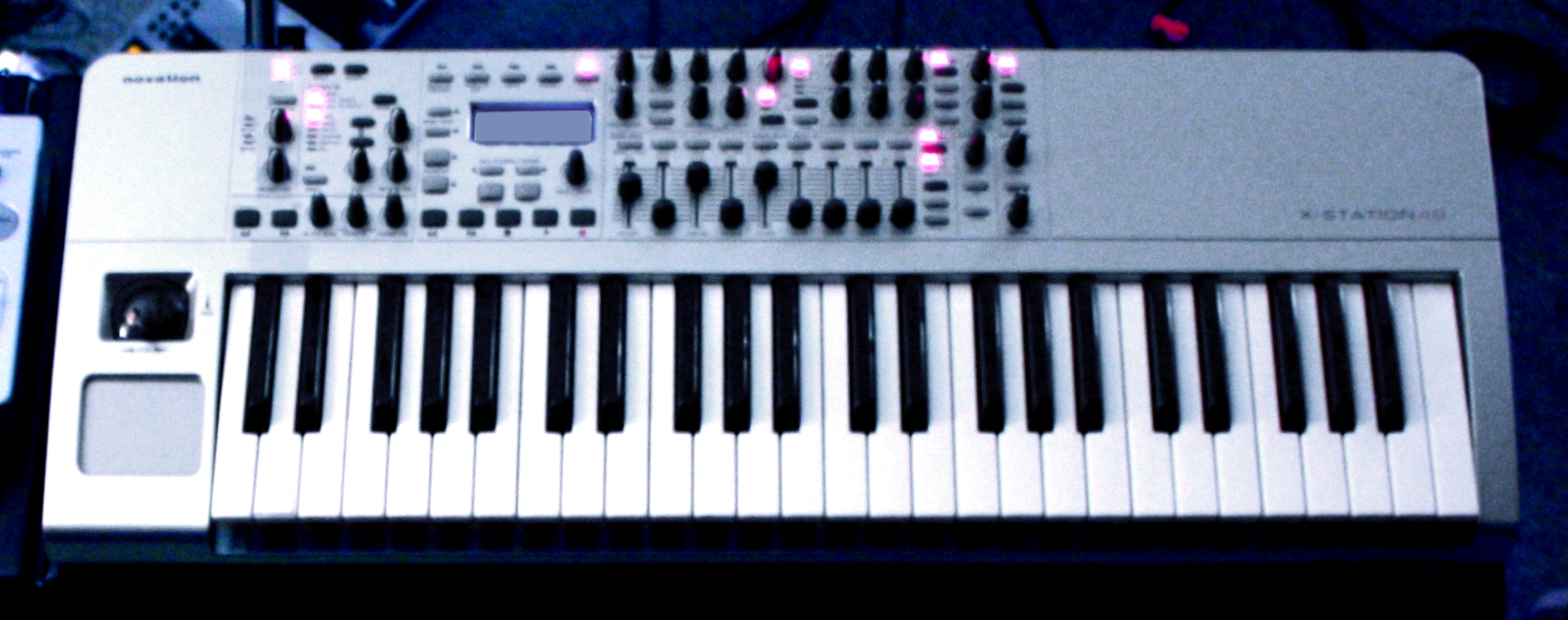
X-Station 49 (2004)

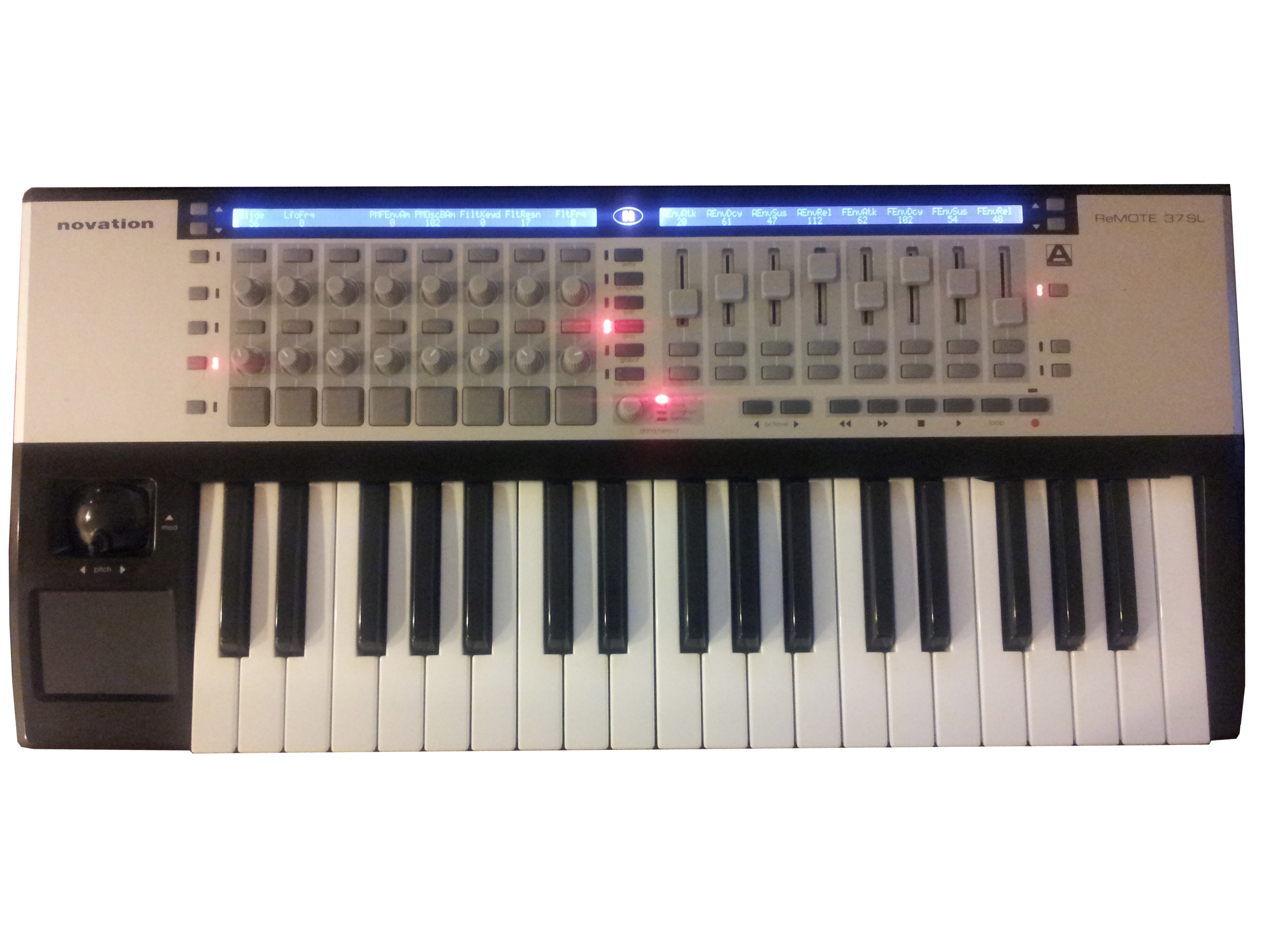
ReMOTE 37SL (2006)

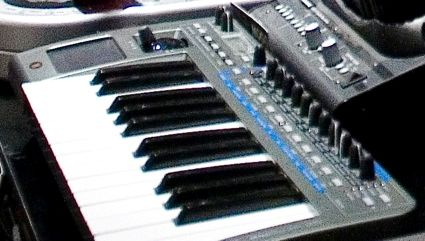
Xio-Synth 25 (2007)

ReMOTE 25 MIDI controller keyboard (2003) was conceived in 2003 to bring back "hands on" tweaking to the computer musician. In addition to the ReMOTE 25, which was MIDI based, the ReMOTE 25 Audio provided the same facilities with the addition of a built-in USB audio interface and later developed into the X-Station. The ReMOTE keyboards were originally developed as controllers for Propellerhead Reason.

V-Station and B-Station (2003). These software products, no longer available as of 2022, provided virtual emulations of the K-Station and Bass Station respectively. Both were available for Macintosh and Windows platforms, in both VST and AU formats.

X-Station (2004) was designed to create a complete music-making environment by adding a computer/sequencer, microphone and monitoring. Supernova class 8-voice ASM-based synth engine, template-based ReMOTE style MIDI control and a 2-in, 2-out stereo audio interface and multi effects engine plus semi-weighted aftertouch keyboard.

ReMOTE Zero SL (2006) was an addition to Novation's MIDI and USB controller range – most of which feature keyboards – with no (zero) keys. What the Remote Zero SL did offer was an enormous selection of knobs, buttons, sliders and trigger pads that could all be freely assigned to virtually any hardware device or application that supports MIDI. At the heart of the Remote SL range was Automap, which detects the sequencer in use and the software plugin instruments used in the project. It then intelligently and logically maps the software's controls to the controller's host of rotary controls, slider and push buttons.

Nio 2|4 (2007) was a multi-platform compact 2-in, 4-out USB audio interface aimed at musicians in general and guitarists in particular, bundled with a specially selected complement of 20 software effects in the Nio FX Rack application, controlled from the unit's front panel, which resembled a guitar effects pedal.

XioSynth (2006) was a keyboard synthesiser with USB audio interface and template-based MIDI controller, available in 25- or 49-key versions. Like the X-Station, it featured Novation's X/Y touchpad (the 'X-Pad') and included a synth engine based on that in the X-Station with the addition of filter overdrive and the X-Gator patch programmer, which can be configured to gate each patch to create 16-32-step rhythmic patterns synchronised to MIDI clock.

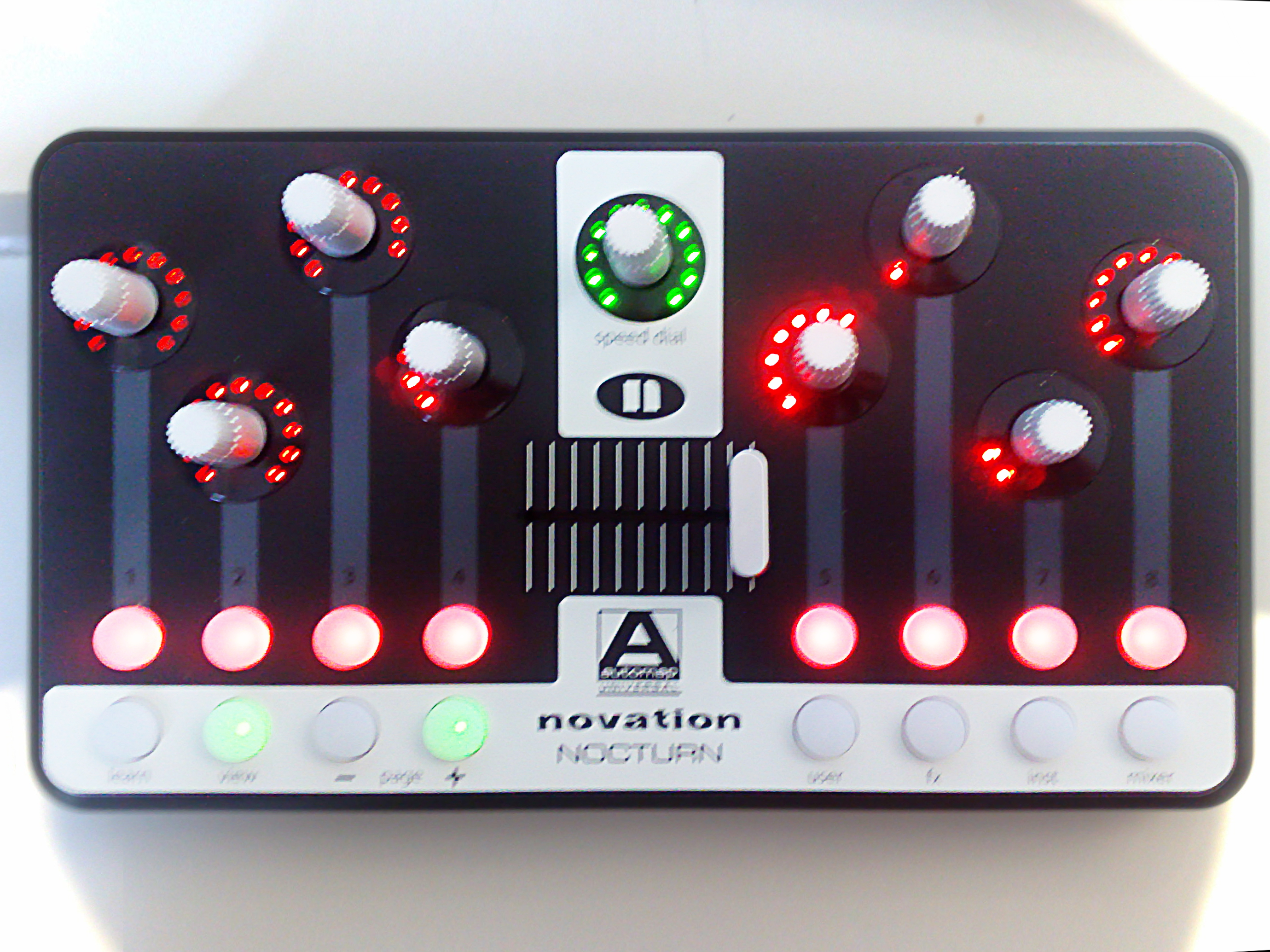
Nocturn (2008)

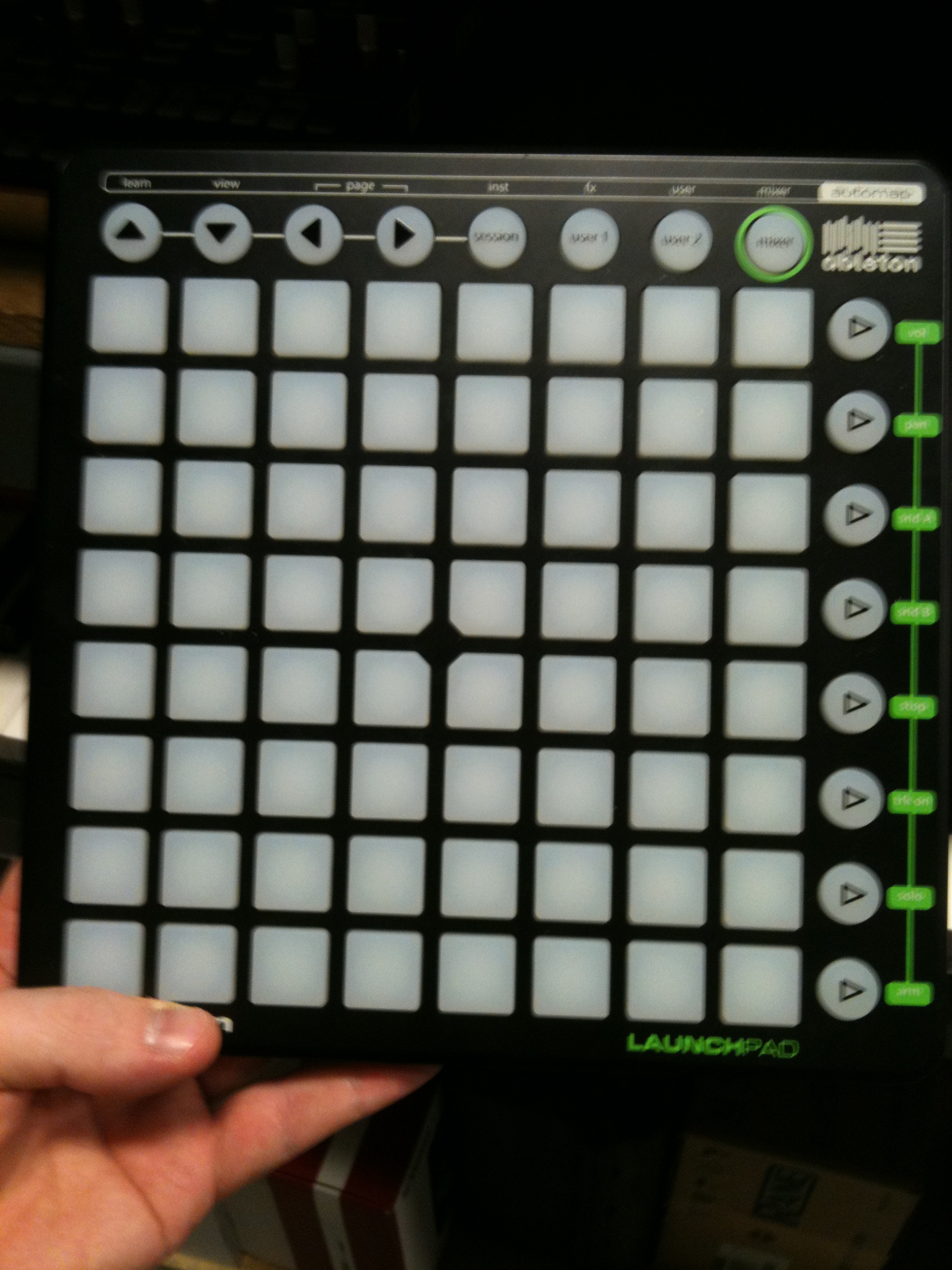
Launchpad (2009)

Nocturn (2008) takes the Automap technology from the Remote SL range and applied it to a compact controller. Utilising the automation frameworks used by various plugin architectures such as VST, Audio Units and RTAS, Nocturn downloads a list of controllable settings provided by a plug-in and assigns them to its combination of knobs and buttons. Eight touch-sensitive rotary shaft encoder controls with a ring of LEDs around each to indicate its setting; touch-sensitive crossfader; and a Speed Dial knob allowing patch selection and the ability to control any on-screen parameter.

The SL ReMOTE range was updated (2008–2009) to SL ReMOTE Mk II to include touch-sensitive knobs and sliders and Automap technology. SL MkII controllers were available with 25, 49 and 61 note velocity/aftertouch keyboards. Included eight rotary shaft encoders. Version with no keyboard was named ZeRO SL Mk II.

Launchpad (2009) is a multi-button controller for the popular live control application Ableton Live, featuring a grid of 64 (8x8) brightly illuminated square buttons. Each button can be assigned to a Clip – a piece of audio or MIDI that may or may not be looped. Additional modes allow Automap control of features and mixer control.

Nocturn 25 and 49 (2009) were essentially the Nocturn rotary encoder-based controller with the addition of a 25- or 49-note velocity/aftertouch keyboard.

Automap for iPhone and iPod Touch (2009) is an app providing basic remote control of DAWs, effects, sequencers or plug-in parameters using two faders and eight buttons on an iOS device.

=== Novation in the 2010s ===
Novation solidified its role in modern electronic music with products like the Launchpad (2009), which became iconic in live performance and clip launching in Ableton Live. The Bass Station II (2013) revived its analogue roots, while the Peak (2017) introduced a hybrid digital-analogue flagship synth. The Circuit (2015) brought portable, standalone music-making into focus. The decade highlighted Novation’s push towards performance-focused, DAW-integrated, and standalone instruments.

Dicer (2010) consists of a pair of hardware button sets – five large operational buttons and three mode select buttons – designed to attach to the corners of a turntable or laptop and allow users of DJ applications such as Traktor and Serato the ability to control loops, cues and effects.

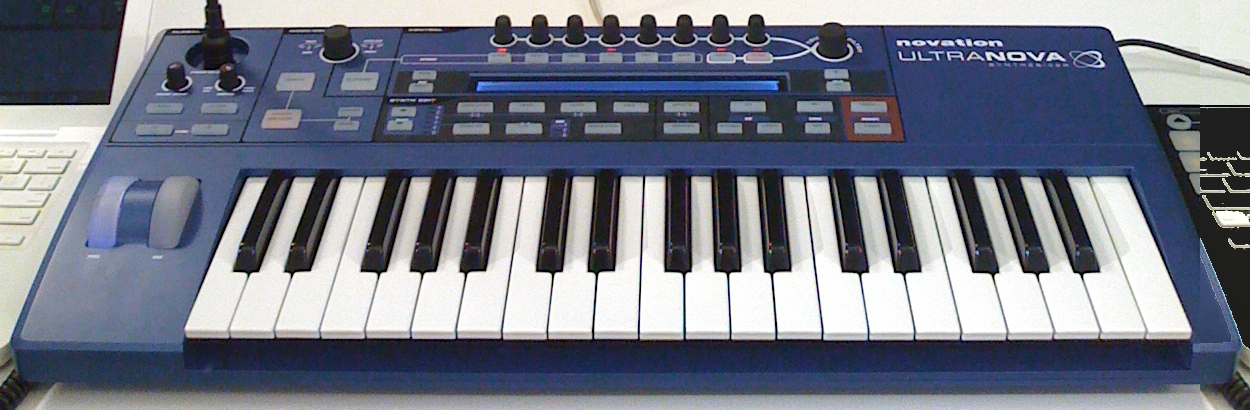
UltraNova (2010)

UltraNova (2010) is a 'Nova' series USB bus-powered single-part analogue-modelling synthesiser with an effects processor based on the Supernova II synth engine plus wavetable synthesis, enhanced filters, a software editor and a new touch-sense performance mode. Up to 18 voices, 14 filter types, 36 wavetables, and 5 effect slots, 37 full-sized keys and aftertouch, a 12-band vocoder and 2-in 4-out USB interface.

Twitch (2011) is a DJ controller with touchstrips instead of turntable emulators to navigate tracks, slice up beats and mix them back together on the fly. Includes a built-in audio interface. Originally developed in collaboration with Serato.

Impulse (2011) is a range of professional USB/MIDI controllers combining a 25-, 49- or 61-note precision semi-weighted aftertouch keyboard with a control surface providing DAW control including mixer, transport and plug-in instruments and effects powered by Automap control software. Impulse also has 8 back-lit performance pads that can trigger drums, effects, and launch Live clips.

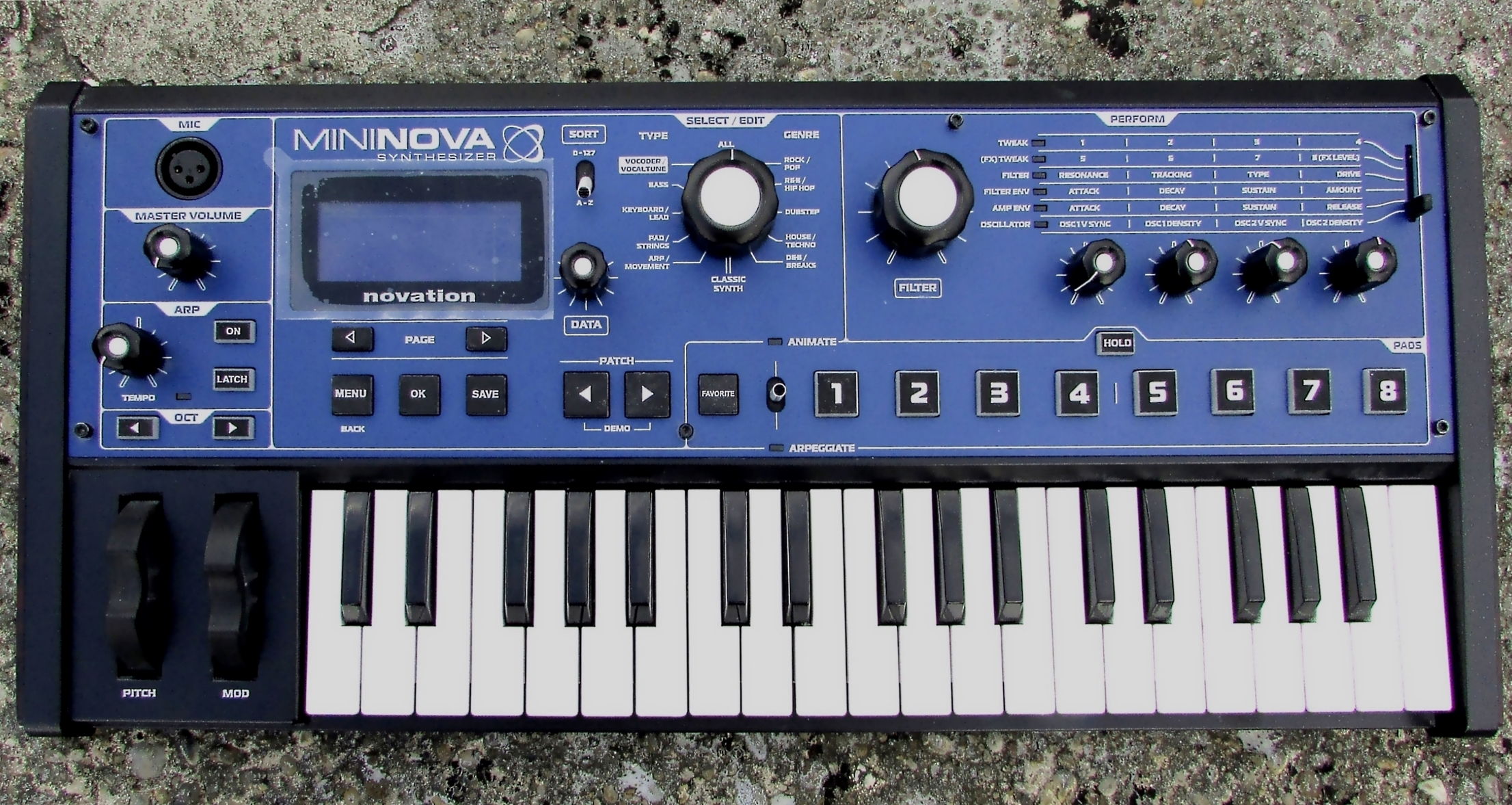
MiniNova (2012)

MiniNova (2012) is a micro synth with 37-note keyboard based around the same synth engine as the UltraNova, capable of creating and editing sounds with up to 18 voices and effects. The VocalTune function can recreate iconic urban and hip hop vocal sounds, as well as classic house and techno voice effects with the onboard vocoder. MiniNova is a live synthesiser allowing sounds to be tweaked and modified in realtime. A range of free soundpacks created by eminent artists and sound designers including Chuckie, Ultimate Patches and more are available for download.

Launchkey (2013) is a range of 25, 37, 49 and 61 note keyboard controllers with up to 50 physical controls including 16 velocity-sensitive multi-colour launch pads that trigger clips and launch scenes in Ableton Live. As well as enabling hands-on control of a DAW mixer, instruments and more, Launchkey is an integrated software/hardware instrument with two apps for iPad: the Launchkey app and the Launchpad app, plus the V-Station & Bass Station synth plug-ins for Mac and Windows.

Launchkey app includes 60 synth sounds that can be changed instantly using interactive graphics. The Launchpad app is an app for iPad that makes it possible to create beats and music using an extensive selection of high quality loops and sounds can be combined in the multicolour 8x6 Launchpad grid. Eight volume sliders allow quick volume changes and FX modes offer DJ effects such as beat-repeaters and synced filter effects.

Launchpad S (2013) is an updated and brighter version original LaunchPad with faster flicker, response rate and brighter buttons.

Bass Station II (2013) is a re-working of the original concept with two filters, three oscillators, patch save and a fully analogue effects section and signal path. It includes a step-mode sequencer, arpeggiator, a dual octave (25-note) velocity-sensitive keyboard with full-sized keys, and a comprehensive modulation section. There's also full MIDI I/O and USB connectivity. AFX Mode, added with firmware v4.14 allows for modification of patches on a key-by-key basis. A variety of free & paid sounds by Ultimate Patches are available for download.

Launchpad Pro, Launchpad MkII, Launchpad Mini, and Launchpad Mini MkII (2015) are other updated versions of the Launchpad. Launchpad Pro and Launchpad MkII introduce a new RGB feature, Launchpad Pro has velocity and aftertouch sensitivity, 16 more side buttons, and standalone external MIDI I/O mode. As well as a setup mode

Circuit (2015) is a multi-part groovebox sequencer, featuring two synth engines (derived from the MiniNova) and a four part sample based drum machine. It consists of a 4x8 sequencer/note grid, 8 knobs and is battery-powered.

MoroderNova (2015) is a limited-edition version of the MiniNova synthesiser, released in collaboration with legendary producer Giorgio Moroder. Launched in 2015, it features the same powerful synth engine as the MiniNova, with three oscillators per voice, 18-voice polyphony, and a wide range of modulation and effects. The MoroderNova comes preloaded with a bank of signature sounds inspired by Moroder’s iconic work, and features a distinctive silver design with custom branding.

Peak (2017) is a digital / analogue hybrid synthesiser with a unique oscillator architecture designed by Chris Huggett, based on FPGA technology. The Peak has eight voices of polyphony: three FPGA oscillators per voice plus an independent noise source. While the oscillators are digital, the filter is analog, as are the distortion circuits (consisting of pre- and post-filter overdrive and a separate overdrive affecting the composite output).

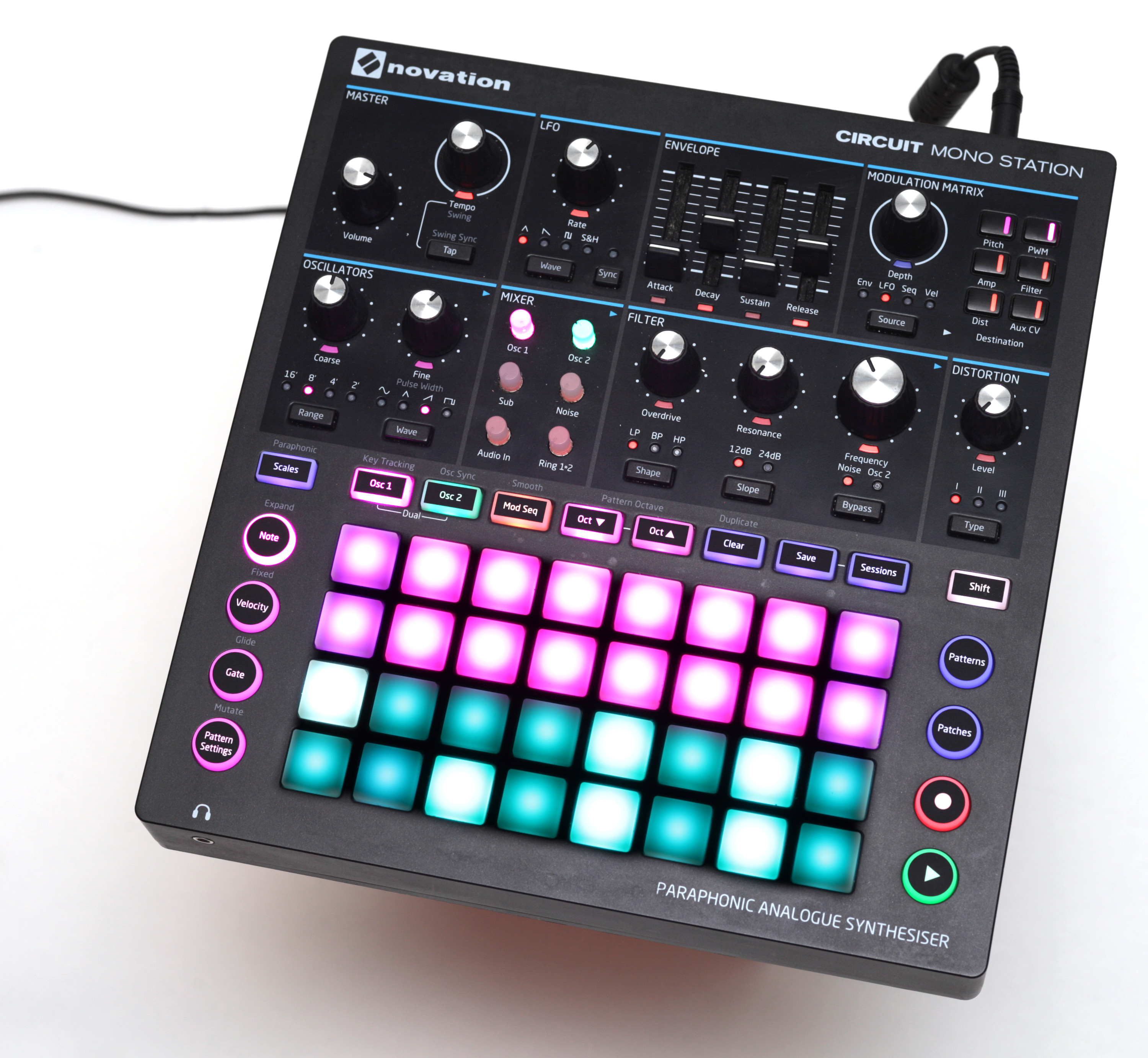
A Novation Circuit Mono Station

Circuit Mono Station (2017) is an Analogue Paraphonic synthesiser in the Circuit family. It uses a similar 4x8 grid but has more control knobs for specific parameters of the synth engine. Its two oscillators can be sequenced together or used paraphonically (a variation on Duophony, where each oscillators pitch can be played separately, but uses only one master amp envelope).

SL MkIII (2018) s a premium MIDI controller keyboard designed for deep integration with both software and hardware setups. Available in 49- and 61-key versions, it features a high-resolution screen per control, velocity-sensitive keys with aftertouch, RGB pads, and an eight-track polyphonic sequencer. The SL MkIII supports seamless DAW control and includes CV, Gate, and Clock outputs for modular gear, making it a central hub for hybrid studio and live rigs. With advanced mapping capabilities and tight Ableton Live integration, it's built for producers, performers, and sound designers seeking hands-on control across multiple devices.

Summit (2019) is a flagship 16-voice polyphonic synthesiser. Built on the same digital New Oxford Oscillator architecture as the Peak, the Summit combines two Peak-style synth engines into a single keyboard instrument with a 61-key semi-weighted keybed. It features three oscillators per voice, analogue multimode filters, extensive modulation capabilities, and onboard effects. Designed for advanced sound design and performance, the Summit supports bi-timbral operation, allowing two patches to be layered or split across the keyboard. Its hybrid design blends digital wavetable synthesis with analogue signal paths, making it a versatile choice for both studio production and live performance.

Launchpad X (2019) is an updated version the launchpad Mk2 line-up, featuring 16 squared off edge buttons. the 64 main buttons which have become velocity and pressure sensitive. The Launchpad X also now has a setup mode just like the Launchpad Pro Mk2. And uses a USB-C Type Cable to connect. It comes with a Copy of Ableton Live 10.

=== Novation in the 2020s ===
In the 2020s, Novation expanded and refined its core product lines. It launched the Launchkey [MK3], FLkey, and SL MkIII, strengthening its DAW controller offerings. The Circuit Rhythm and Circuit Tracks brought modern updates to its groovebox concept. Collaboration with Aphex Twin led to the AFX Station, and the Summit continued its high-end synth innovation. This decade has seen Novation embracing both software integration and standalone creativity, with a strong focus on workflow and user experience.

Launchkey [MK3] (2020) is a range of MIDI keyboard controllers designed for intuitive control of Ableton Live and other major DAWs. Available in 25-, 37-, 49-, 61-, and later (2022), 88-key versions, each model features velocity-sensitive keys, RGB backlit pads, and transport and mixer controls. The MK3 generation introduced standalone arpeggiator and chord modes, customisable MIDI mapping, and deeper DAW integration. With Scale and Chord modes, users can stay in key and build complex harmonies easily, making Launchkey [MK3] a versatile choice for both studio production and live performance.

AFX Station (2020) is a limited-edition monophonic synthesiser developed in collaboration with Aphex Twin. Released in 2020, it is a custom version of the Bass Station II, featuring a unique look and pre-installed firmware (also available for Bass Station II) that expands its sonic capabilities. AFX Mode allows each key to trigger a different patch or parameter configuration, enabling complex, expressive sound design and sequencing.

Launchpad Pro [MK3], Launchpad Mini [MK3] (2020) After releasing the Launchpad X for the 10 year anniversary of Launchpad. Novation released the Launchpad Mini Mk3 as well as the Launchpad Pro Mk3. The Launchpad Mini Mk3 Has the same layout as the Launchpad X. Unlike previous versions of the Launchpad Mini. This one Has RGB Pads. The new Launchpad Pro Mk3, Has 32 Squared Off Edge Buttons. Both Devices Use USB-C Type Cables To Connect and both come with a license to Ableton Live 10 Lite.

Circuit Rhythm and Tracks (2021) are standalone grooveboxes designed for electronic music production and live performance. Circuit Rhythm focuses on sample-based beatmaking, featuring eight tracks for sample playback, real-time and step sequencing, performance effects, and grid-based slicing. It includes features like sample recording, resampling, and pattern chaining, making it ideal for beatmakers and live performers. Circuit Tracks combines two polyphonic synth tracks with four drum tracks, pattern sequencing, effects, and MIDI output for controlling external gear. It offers built-in synth engines, sidechain, and automation, tailored for melodic composition and sequencing. Both units feature velocity-sensitive RGB pads, built-in rechargeable batteries, and microSD storage, offering portable, DAW-less workflows.

FLkey (2022) range is a series of MIDI keyboard controllers designed for deep integration with FL Studio. It includes the compact FLkey Mini, mid-sized FLkey 25 and FLkey 37, and full-sized FLkey 49 and FLkey 61 models. All versions offer velocity-sensitive keys and pads, while larger models add faders, knobs, and enhanced mixer control. FLkey gives users hands-on access to channel rack, step sequencer, mixer, and transport functions, making it an intuitive tool for FL Studio producers at any level.

Launchkey MK4 (2024) - a series of MIDI keyboard controllers designed for integration with Ableton Live and other major DAWs. The MK4 generation includes Mini 25-, Mini 37-, 25-, 37-, 49-, and 61-key models, each offering velocity-sensitive keys, RGB backlit pads, faders (on 49- and 61-key versions), and transport controls. Key updates over previous models include an improved keybed, expanded standalone functionality, and deeper DAW integration. Aimed at electronic music producers and performers, the Launchkey MK4 series supports both studio and live use with USB-C connectivity, MIDI Out, and customisable control via Novation Components.

In 2025, British software company GForce Software collaborated with Novation to release the GForce Bass Station, a modern software emulation of Novation’s original 1993 Bass Station synthesiser. The virtual instrument was developed using the original hardware schematics and components, with input from members of the original Novation engineering team, including Chris Huggett’s legacy of design work. It aimed to faithfully recreate the analogue character and simplicity of the original Bass Station, while adding modern enhancements such as expanded modulation, filter tracking, and MIDI control options. The GForce Bass Station was well received for both its authenticity and usability, appealing to producers seeking the classic acid bass and lead sounds that helped define 1990s electronic music.
