= Songs of Silence =

Songs of Silence may refer to:

- Songs of Silence (Sonata Arctica album), 2002
- Songs of Silence (Vince Clarke album), 2023
- Songs of Silence, a 2024 video game
