= Vince Clarke =

English musician (born 1960)

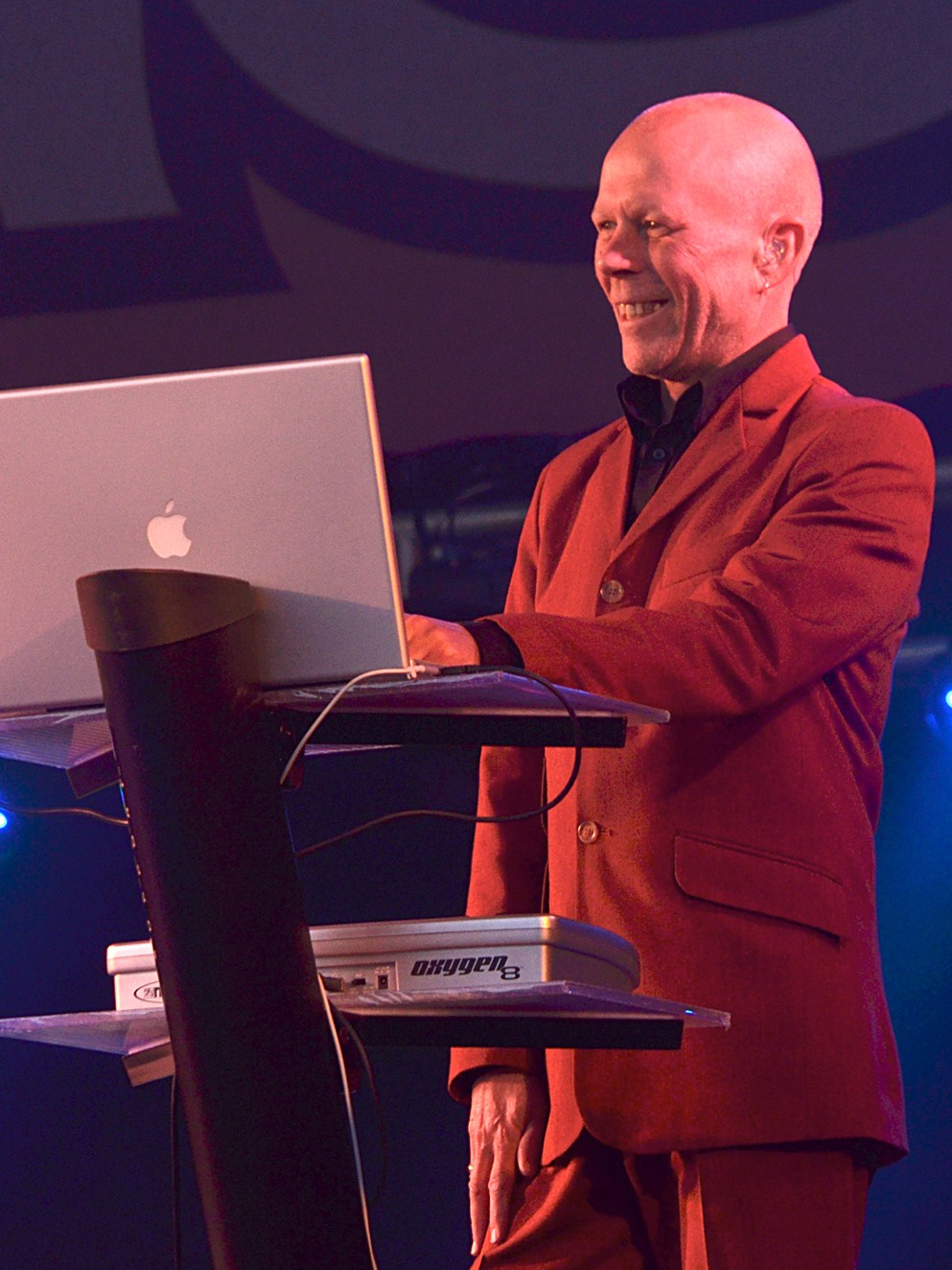
- Clarke performing with Erasure at Delamere Forest in Cheshire, England, 2011

Background information
- Born: Vincent John Martin; 3 July 1960 (age 66); South Woodford, Essex, England
- Origin: London, England
- Genres: Synth-pop; electropop; new wave; dance
- Occupations: Musician; songwriter; remixer; DJ; record producer
- Instruments: Synthesizer; keyboards; guitar; vocals
- Years active: 1977–present
- Labels: Mute; Reset; VeryRecords
- Member of: Erasure; Doublespeak
- Formerly of: Depeche Mode; Yazoo; The Assembly; VCMG
- Spouse: Tracy Hurley Martin (m. 2004; died 2024)
- Website: erasureinfo.com

Vincent John Martin (born 3 July 1960), known professionally as Vince Clarke, is a British synth-pop musician and songwriter. Clarke has been the main composer and musician of the band Erasure since its inception in 1985, and was previously the main songwriter for several groups, including Depeche Mode, Yazoo, and The Assembly. In Erasure, he is known for his deadpan and low-key onstage demeanour, often remaining motionless over his keyboard, in sharp contrast to lead vocalist Andy Bell's animated and hyperactive frontman antics.

Erasure have recorded over 200 songs and have sold over 28 million albums worldwide. Clarke was inducted into the Rock and Roll Hall of Fame in 2020 as a member of Depeche Mode.

== Early life and influences ==
Vincent John Martin was born on 3 July 1960 in South Woodford, Essex; he later moved to Basildon, Essex. He initially studied the violin and then the piano. Clarke's early musical influences included Sparks, Paul Simon, and Orchestral Manoeuvres in the Dark (OMD), who inspired his interest in electronic music. Clarke also cites electronic influences such as the Human League, Daniel Miller and Fad Gadget.

In the late 1970s, Clarke and schoolmate Andy Fletcher formed a short-lived band called No Romance in China, with Clarke on vocals and guitar and Fletcher on bass guitar. In 1979, Clarke played guitar in the Plan, an Ultravox-influenced band, with friends Robert Marlow and Paul Langwith.

== Career ==
=== Depeche Mode ===
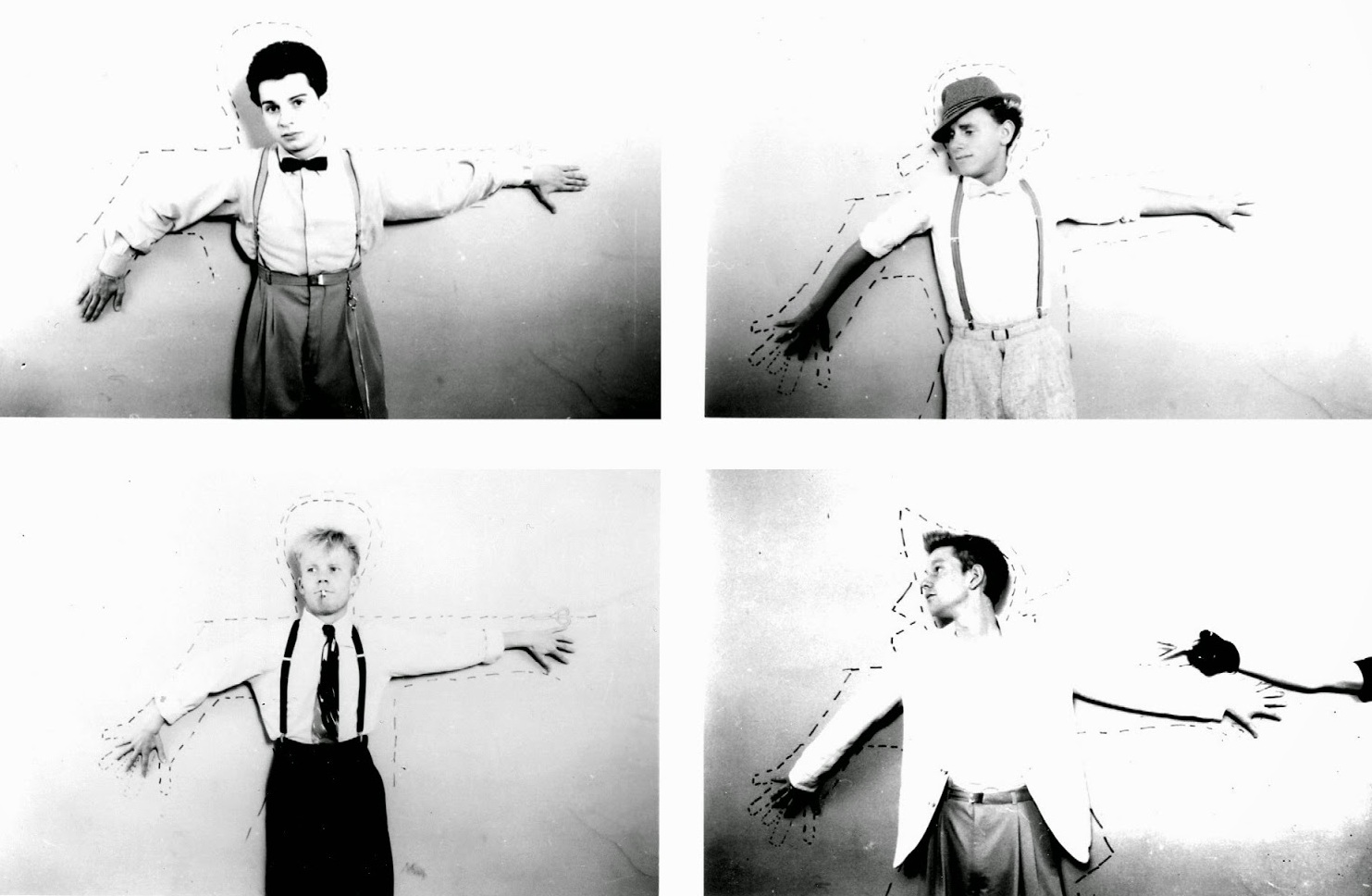
Clarke (bottom-left) as a member of Depeche Mode, 1981

In 1980, after the Plan dissolved, Clarke and Fletcher formed Composition of Sound, and were soon joined by Martin Gore. Clarke provided vocals until lead vocalist Dave Gahan joined the band, which was renamed Depeche Mode. At that time, he adopted the stage name Vince Clarke, by which he is currently known. The band initially adopted a slick synthesised electropop sound, which produced the studio album Speak & Spell and the Clarke-penned singles "Dreaming of Me", "New Life", and "Just Can't Get Enough" in 1981.

Clarke left Depeche Mode shortly thereafter. He later said he couldn't remember exactly why he left, but potentially due to ego problems, thinking he would go back to work for British Rail. Clarke also stated that he did not enjoy the public aspects of success, such as touring and interviews, and found himself frequently at odds with his bandmates, particularly on the tour bus. He also stated: "I think everybody in the band, especially myself, imagined that the reason we were doing so well was because of themselves ... We were pretty young and very lucky, and things had happened very quickly for us, and I don't think we were really mature to handle the situation." Clarke was replaced by musician Alan Wilder.

=== Yazoo ===
Clarke then teamed with lead vocalist Alison Moyet (at the time known by the nickname of Alf) to form the popular synth-pop duo Yazoo (known as Yaz in the US), which produced two studio albums, the platinum-certified Upstairs at Eric's and You and Me Both. Their hits include "Only You", "Don't Go", "Situation", "The Other Side of Love" and "Nobody's Diary".

Yazoo disbanded in 1983, and Moyet had a successful solo career. Yazoo reformed in 2008/2009 for a series of live dates to celebrate 25 years since the duo's split.

=== The Assembly ===
Clarke teamed up with Eric Radcliffe in 1983. Their idea was to collaborate with different artists on each new single, under the name the Assembly. With singer Feargal Sharkey, former lead vocalist of the Undertones, they scored the top 5 UK hit "Never Never". Meanwhile, Clarke founded the label Reset Records with Radcliffe. During 1983 and 1984 he produced four singles, "The Face of Dorian Gray", "I Just Want to Dance", "Claudette", and "Calling All Destroyers" for his friend Robert Marlow, which were released on this label. They also produced a studio album, at first shelved but later released in 1999, under the name The Peter Pan Effect. In 1985, another collaboration took place with Paul Quinn of Bourgie Bourgie; the result was the single "One Day" by Vince Clarke & Paul Quinn. However, the project never took off, and Clarke moved to other projects.

=== Erasure ===
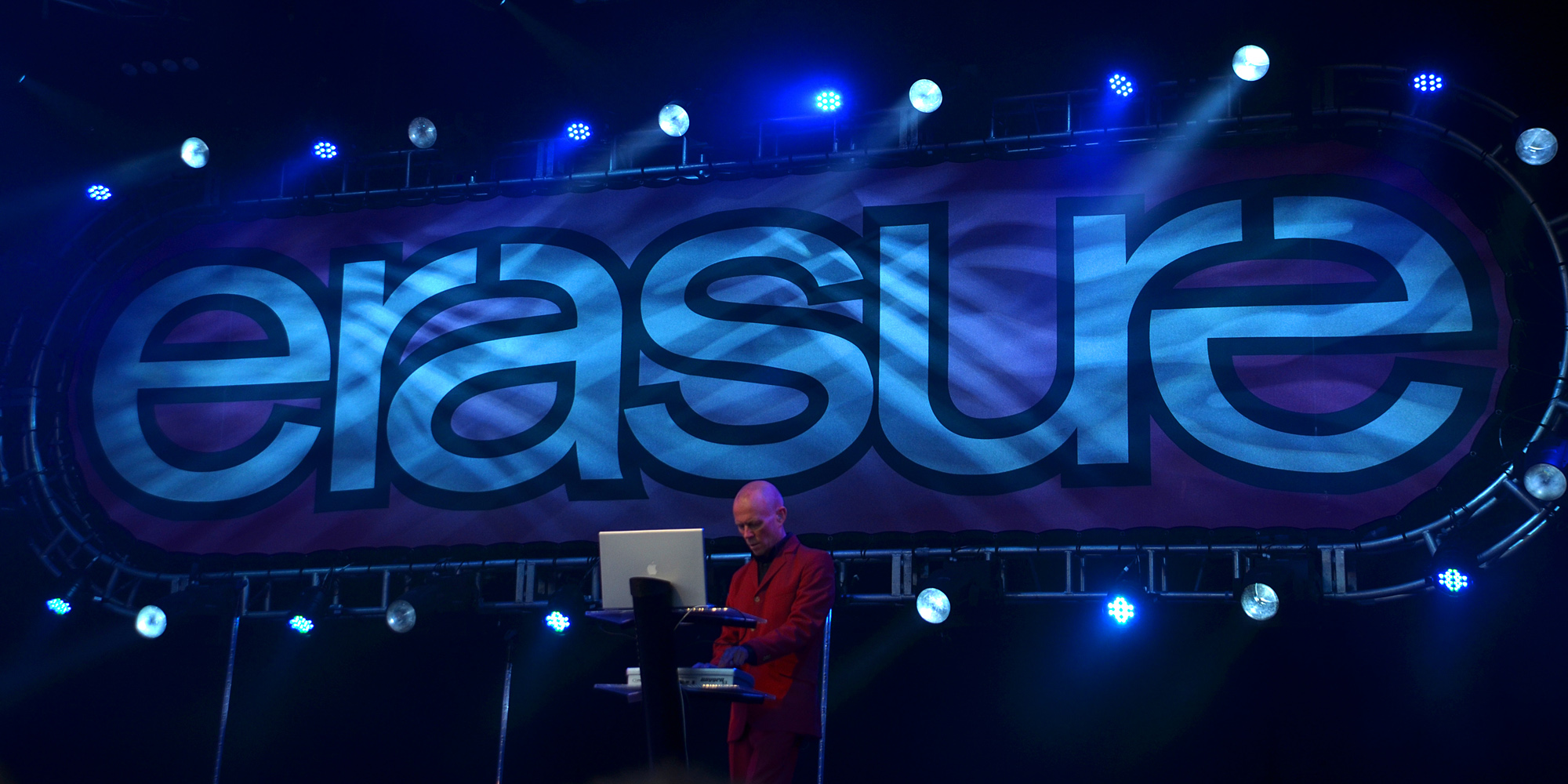
Clarke performing with Erasure at Delamere Forest in Cheshire, England, 2011

In early 1985, Clarke placed an advertisement in Melody Maker for a singer, and one applicant was Andy Bell, who was a fan of his earlier projects. He teamed with Bell to form the group Erasure, and the duo became one of the major selling acts in British music with international hits like "Oh L'amour", "Sometimes", "Chains of Love", "A Little Respect", "Drama!", "Blue Savannah", "Chorus", "Love to Hate You", "Take a Chance on Me", and "Always".

As of November 2022, the duo have released 19 studio albums and have enjoyed a long string of hit singles spanning their four decades together. In 2026, Clarke announced Erasure would be retiring from touring, saying “I just don’t want to do it anymore.”

=== VCMG ===
In 2011, Clarke collaborated with his former Depeche Mode colleague Martin Gore for the first time since 1981, as techno duo VCMG, on an instrumental minimalist electronic dance album called Ssss, released on 12 March 2012. The first EP, entitled Spock, was released worldwide exclusively on Beatport on 30 November 2011. The second EP, Single Blip, was once again first released exclusively on Beatport on 20 February 2012. Their third EP, Aftermaths, was released on 20 August 2012.

=== Collaborations and other works ===
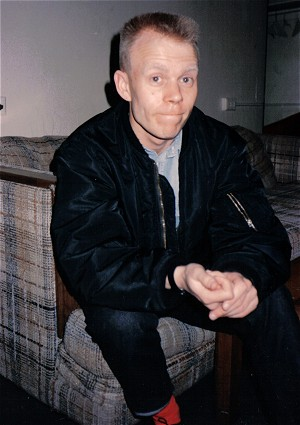
Clarke in San Francisco, 1986

In July 1984, Clarke teamed with Stephen Luscombe of Blancmange, Pandit Dinesh, and Asha Bhosle. The group, West India Company, released a four-track, self-titled EP.

Clarke worked with synth-pop producer Martyn Ware (of Heaven 17 and The Human League) in 1999 as The Clarke & Ware Experiment and released the album Pretentious. The duo collaborated again in 2001 for the album Spectrum Pursuit Vehicle, which was created with "3D music technology" specifically designed for listening in headphones. That same year also saw the release of the Clarke-produced album Erasure's Vince Clarke, which featured The Peter Pan Effect, an album that he and Eric Radcliffe produced for his long-time friend Robert Marlow. Clarke wrote "Let's Get Together" for the pop girl group Girl Authority for their second and final studio album Road Trip (2007). The song was originally meant to be for Depeche Mode but was never recorded by them. Clarke also co-wrote "What Do I Want from You?" with Freeform Five, for their debut studio album Strangest Things (2005).

Clarke participated in a 2000 project called Family Fantastic. They produced the album Nice!. In 2008 Family Fantastic released a second album, entitled Wonderful. In 2001, Clarke founded Illustrious Co. Ltd. with Martyn Ware, to create new forms of spatialised sound composition using their unique 3D AudioScape system, collaborating with fine artists, educational establishments, the performing arts, live events, corporate clients, and educational settings round the world. In 2004, Clarke provided additional music for an episode of Johnny Bravo titled "The Time of My Life". This was a collaboration with Richard Butler of the Psychedelic Furs.

On 21 May 2009, Clarke was awarded with an "Outstanding Song Collection" prize, during the Ivor Novello Awards ceremony of the same day, in recognition of 30 years in the music industry. Clarke was featured in the BBC Four documentary Synth Britannia (2009).

In 2012, Clarke produced a cover of the Depeche Mode song "Fly on the Windscreen" featuring Ane Brun. Clarke also did DJ sets in various locations in North America and Europe and also continued his production work of remixing songs for Dido and Chad Valley.

On 14 July 2015, Clarke announced a collaboration with Jean-Michel Jarre called "Automatic", released as a part of the studio album Electronica 1: The Time Machine on 16 October 2015. On 10 June 2016, in collaboration with Paul Hartnoll, Clarke digitally released the album 2 Square on his new record label, VeryRecords.

Since 2017, Clarke has hosted The Synthesizer Show with VeryRecords artist Reed Hays on Maker Park Radio, a non-profit community streaming radio station from Staten Island, New York. Clarke's first solo album called Songs of Silence was released on 17 November 2023.

In 2026, Clarke joined forces with Blancmange's Neil Arthur and electronic musician Benge to form the supergroup Doublespeak. The trio released their self-titled debut album on 29 May.

== Production and recording methods ==
When Clarke started making music, synthesisers were predominantly analogue. Clarke later migrated to the new industry-standard MIDI, but he continued to prefer analogue instruments. For Erasure's fifth studio album Chorus (1991), he gathered together his collection of analogue synthesisers from various recording studio locations in London and set up a small studio in Amsterdam.

Clarke continued to expand his collection of analogue synthesisers and in 1994 set up "37B", a recording studio built adjacent to his custom-made home, "Ammonite", in Chertsey, Surrey. From 1994 to 2003, all Erasure studio albums were either wholly or in part recorded at "37B".

In 2004, Clarke moved to Maine, USA. While waiting for his studio equipment to be shipped from the UK he began using an Apple Mac laptop with Logic Pro, Max/MSP, and various software synthesisers (many of which were analogue emulations). Since then he has continued to use Logic Pro, along with both software and analogue synthesisers.

As of 2009, Clarke has installed his analogue synthesisers alongside his Logic Pro-based workstation in a custom-built commercial studio called "The Cabin" in Maine.

Current & past studio equipment: Dave Smith Instruments Mopho, Roland System 700, Roland System-100M, Roland Jupiter-8, Roland Jupiter-4, Roland MKS-80, Roland SH-1, Roland VP-330, Roland JP-8000, Roland Juno-60, Roland Juno-106, Roland Super JX, Roland D-550, ARP 2500 Modular, ARP 2600, PPG Wave 2.2, Waldorf Microwave, Waldorf Pulse, Moog Modular, Minimoog, Moog Source, E-Mu Modular System, Buchla 100 series Modular, Sequential Circuits Prophet-5, Sequential Circuits Pro-One, Oxford Synthesiser Company OSCar, Synton Syrinx, Korg MS-20, Korg MS-10, Korg 700, Korg M1, Korg DVP, Serge Modular, Polyfusion Modular, Oberheim Xpander, Oberheim SEM System, RSF Kobol, Casio CZ-101, Casio CZ-1000, Electronic Music Studios VCS 3, Matten and Wiechers x2 48 track sequencers total 96 track, Sennheiser Vocoder VSM201, Apple iPad 2, Apple Power Mac G5, Apple MacBook Pro.

Current & past software: Apple Logic Pro, Cycling '74 Max/MSP, Arturia ARP 2600 V, Arturia Minimoog V, Arturia Moog Modular V, GForce impOSCar, GForce Oddity, LinPlug Octopus, Muon Tau Pro, Native Instruments Absynth, Native Instruments Reaktor, Native Instruments FM7, Native Instruments FM8, Vienna Symphonic String & Choir Libraries.

== Personal life ==
Clarke was married for 20 years to Tracy Hurley Martin (the twin sister of Tonya Hurley), who was a booking agent and publicist to various entertainment artists, including Clarke's former band Depeche Mode. Tracy died in January 2024, two years after her diagnosis of stomach cancer. They have a son.

== Discography ==
with Depeche Mode

- Speak & Spell (1981, studio album)
  - "Dreaming of Me" (1981, single)
  - "New Life" (1981, single)
  - "Just Can't Get Enough" (1981, single)
- The Singles 81→85 (1985, compilation album – only the tracks noted above as singles plus the bonus tracks on the 1998 reissue: "Just Can't Get Enough" (Schizo mix) and "Photographic" (Some Bizzare version))
- Catching Up with Depeche Mode (1985, compilation album – only the tracks noted above as singles)
- Some Great Videos (1985, video album – only "Just Can't Get Enough" clip)
- Remixes 81–04 (2004, compilation album – only tracks "Shout!" (Rio remix) and "Just Can't Get Enough" (Schizo mix))
- The Best of Depeche Mode Volume 1 (2006, compilation album – only "Just Can't Get Enough" track)
- The Best of Videos Volume 1 (2006, video album – only "Just Can't Get Enough" clip)
- Remixes 2: 81–11 (2011, compilation album – only "Puppets" (Röyksopp remix) track)
- Video Singles Collection (2016, video album – only "Just Can't Get Enough" clip)

with Yazoo

- Upstairs at Eric's (1982, studio album)
  - "Only You" (1982, single)
  - "Don't Go" (1982, single)
  - "The Other Side of Love" (1982, single)
  - "Situation" (1982, single)
- You and Me Both (1983, album)
  - "Nobody's Diary" (1983, single)

with the Assembly

- "Never Never" (1983, single)

with Paul Quinn

- "One Day" (1985, single)

with Erasure

with Family Fantastic

- Nice! (2000)
- Wonderful (2008)

with RadioActivators

- "Knock on Your Door" (2001, single)

with VCMG

- Ssss (2012, studio album)
  - "Spock" (2011, EP)
  - "Single Blip" (2012, EP)
  - "Aftermaths" (2012, EP)

with Doublespeak

- Doublespeak (2026, studio album)

Solo

- Lucky Bastard (1993, sample CD)
- Deeptronica (2009, studio album)
- Songs of Silence (2023, studio album)

In collaboration with Martyn Ware

- Pretentious (1999, as The Clarke and Ware Experiment)
- Spectrum Pursuit Vehicle (2001, as Vincent Clarke & Martyn Ware)
- Electro Clash (2003, six tracks only as Clarke 'N' Ware)
- The House of Illustrious (2012, as The Clarke and Ware Experiment)

In collaboration with Paul Hartnoll

- 2Square (2016, album)
- "Better Have a Drink to Think" (2016, single)

In collaboration with Árstraumur

- "Aurora III (feat Vince Clarke)" (2025, albumtrack on Aurora)

Remixes (outside of Erasure)

- 1988 Happy Mondays – "WFL (Wrote for Luck)"
- 1990 Betty Boo – "24 Hours" (Oratronic mix)
- 1991 Fortran 5 – "Heart on the Line" (V.C. mix)
- 1991 Habit – "Power"
- 1992 Nitzer Ebb – "Ascend" (Anonymous mix)
- 1992 The Wolfgang Press – "Angel"
- 1992 Betty Boo – "I'm on My Way" (The Batman and Robin mix)
- 1993 The Time Frequency – "Real Love '93" (Vince Clarke remix)
- 1994 Sparks – "When Do I Get to Sing 'My Way'" (Vince Clarke remix & Vince Clarke extended remix)
- 1994 Alison Moyet – "Whispering Your Name" (A remix)
- 1995 Egebamyasi – "Remont" (Vince version)
- 1995 Wubble-U – "Down – Get 'Em Down" (Vince Clarke remix)
- 1997 White Town – "Wanted" (Vince Clarke mix)
- 2001 Marlow – "My Teenage Dream" (Stealth mix)
- 2001 Marlow – "No Heart" (Vince Clarke 2001 dance mix)
- 2002 Simple Minds – "Homosapien" (Vince Clarke remix)
- 2005 Andy Bell – "Crazy" (Vince Clarke remix)
- 2005 Rammstein – "Mann Gegen Mann" (Popular Music mix)
- 2006 Rosenstolz – "Nichts Von Alledem (Tut Mir Leid)" (Mixed Up mix & Maxed Up mix)
- 2006 Noirhaus – "It's Over" (Vince Clarke remix)
- 2009 The Saturdays – "Issues" (Vince Clarke extended & Vince Clarke radio edit)
- 2009 Marlow – "Home" (Vince Clarke's Starstruck mix)
- 2009 Polly Scattergood – "Other Too Endless" (Vince Clarke remix)
- 2009 Franz Ferdinand – "No You Girls" (Vince Clarke mix)
- 2009 The Presets – "If I Know You" (Vince Clarke remix)
- 2009 Space Cowboy – "Falling Down" (Vince Clarke remix)
- 2009 A Place to Bury Strangers – "In Your Heart" (Vince Clarke remix)
- 2009 Ash – "True Love 1980" (Vince Clarke remix)
- 2010 Andy Bell – "Call on Me" (Vince Clarke remix)
- 2010 Andy Bell – "Non-Stop" (Vince Clarke remix)
- 2010 Goldfrapp – "Believer" (Vince Clarke remix & Vince Clarke remix edit)
- 2011 Billie Ray Martin – "Sweet Suburban Disco" (Vince Clarke remix)
- 2011 Depeche Mode – "Behind the Wheel" (Vince Clarke remix)
- 2011 Plastikman – "Elektrostatik" (Vince Clarke remix)
- 2012 Liars – "No. 1 Against the Rush" (Vince Clarke remix)
- 2012 VCMG – "Aftermaths" (Vince Clarke remix)
- 2012 Kidnap Kid – "Lazarus Taxon" (Vince Clarke remix)
- 2013 Chad Valley – "Up & Down" (Vince Clarke remix)
- 2013 Dido – "End of Night" (Vince Clarke remix)
- 2013 Blancmange – "Living on the Ceiling" (Vince Clarke remix)
- 2014 Polly Scattergood – "Subsequently Lost" (Vince Clarke remix)
- 2014 Bleachers – "I Wanna Get Better" (Vince Clarke remix)
- 2014 Future Islands – "Doves" (Vince Clarke remix)
- 2015 Simon Lowery – "I am an Astronaut" (Vince Clarke remix)
- 2016 Nitzer Ebb – "Once You Say" (Vince Clarke remix)
- 2016 Andy Bell – "My Precious One" (Vince Clarke remix)
- 2016 Reed & Caroline – "Electrons" (Vince Clarke remix)
- 2017 Bright Light Bright Light – "Running Back to You" (Vince Clarke remix)
- 2017 Miss Kittin & Dubfire – "Ride" (Vince Clarke remix)
- 2017 The Overlords – "God's Eye" (Vince Clarke Loony remix)
- 2017 Alka – "Truncate" (Vince Clarke remix)
- 2018 Ladytron – "The Animals" (Vince Clarke remix)
- 2018 Robert Görl – "Part 1" (Vince Clarke remix)
- 2018 Lanah P – "Pistol in My Pocket" (Erasure 2018 mix)
- 2018 Reed & Caroline – "Before" (Vince Clarke remix)
- 2018 Soft Cell – "Bedsitter" (Erasure remix)
- 2018 Space – "Magic Fly" (Vince Clarke rework)
- 2018 Benjamin Lowery – "Imagine" (Vince Clarke remix)
- 2019 James Yorkston – "Shallow" (Vince Clarke remix)
- 2019 All Hail the Silence – "The Alarm" (Vince Clarke remix)
- 2019 Fujiya & Miyagi – "Fear of Missing Out" (Vince Clarke remix)
- 2019 OMD – "Almost" (Vince Clarke remix)
- 2020 International Teachers of Pop – "Femenenergy" (Vince Clarke remix)
- 2020 Yova – "Rain" (Vince Clarke remix)
- 2020 Alka – "Faito" (Vince Clarke remix)
- 2021 Tiny Magnetic Pets – "Automation" (Vince Clarke remix)
- 2021 Saint Etienne – "Blue Kite" (Vince Clarke remix)
- 2021 Xqui – "Martha" (Vince Clarke remix)
- 2022 Johnny Marr – "Spirit Power & Soul" (Vince Clarke remix)
- 2023 Hifi Sean & David McAlmont – "Real Thoughts in Real Time" (The Clarke version)
- 2023 Klaus Nomi – "Nomi Song" (Vince Clarke remix)
- 2024 Blossoms – "To Do List (After the Breakup)" (feat. Findlay) (Vince Clarke remix)
- 2024 Warrington-Runcorn New Town Development Plan – "A Shared Sense of Purpose" (Vince Clarke remix)
- 2025 The Hidden Cameras - "Undertow" (Vince Clarke remix)
- 2025 James Yorkston – "A Moment Longer" (Vince Clarke remix)
- 2025 Andy Bell – "Dance For Mercy" (Vince Clarke Remix) and "Dance For Mercy" (Vince Clarke Instrumental)
