= VCMG =

English electronic music duo

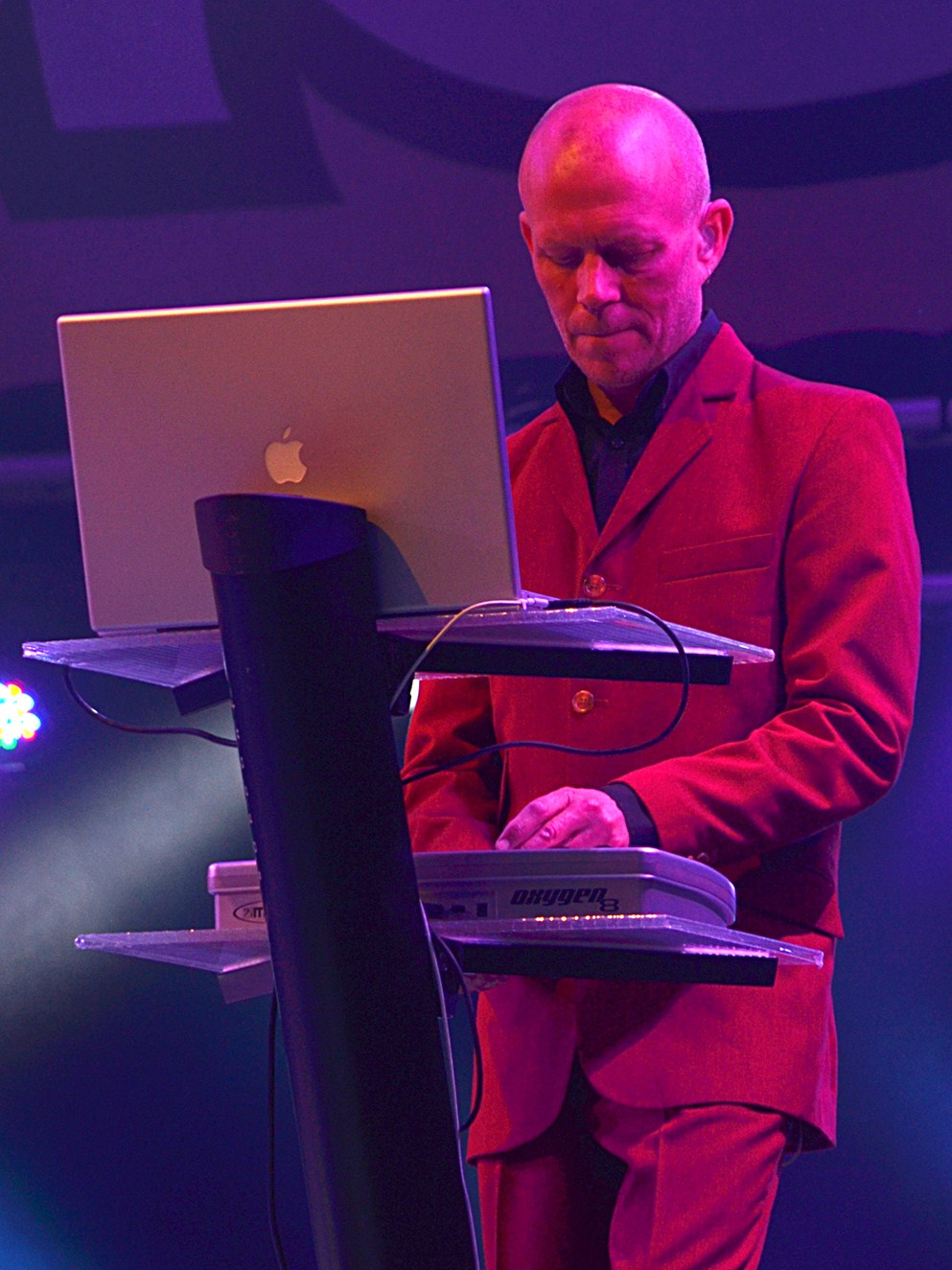
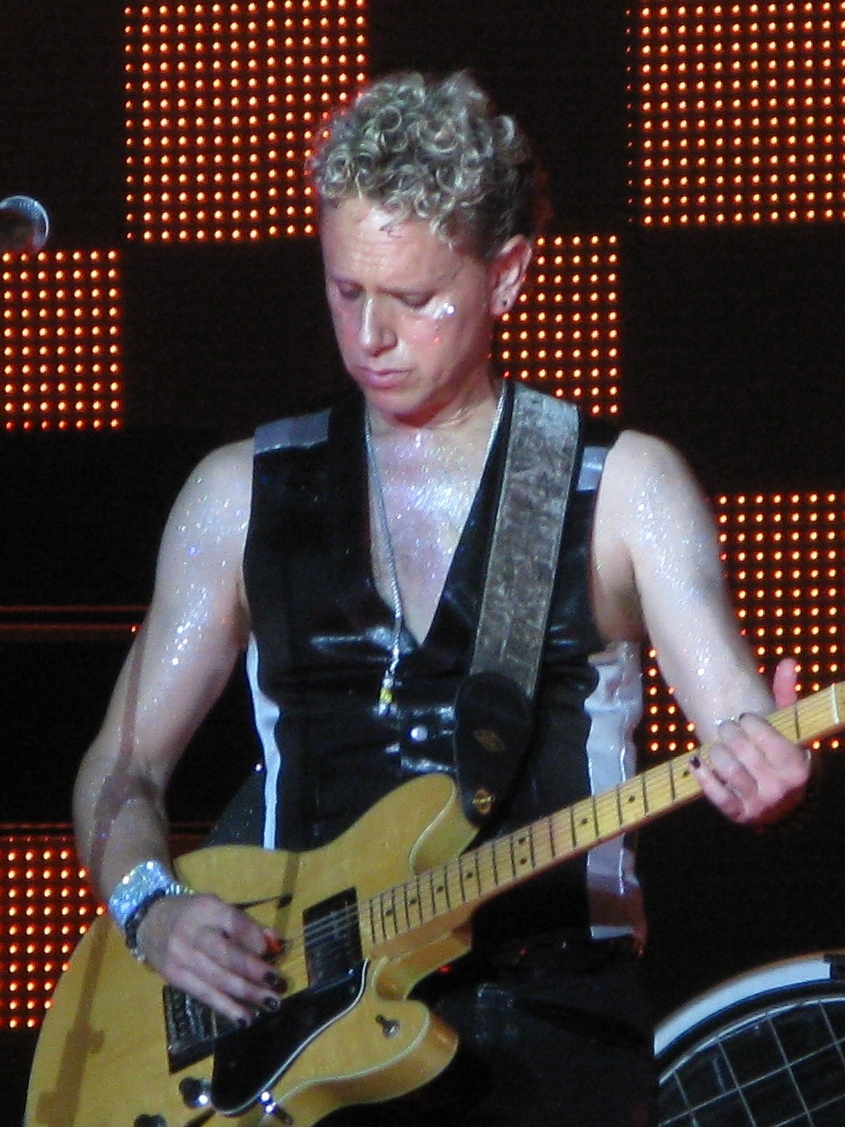
- Vince Clarke (left) and Martin Gore (right)

Background information
- Origin: England
- Genres: Electronic; techno
- Years active: 2011–2012
- Labels: Mute
- Past members: Vince Clarke; Martin Gore
- Website: mute.com/artists/vcmg

VCMG (also stylized as Vcmg) were an English electronic music duo, consisting of Vince Clarke (Erasure, ex-Yazoo, ex-Depeche Mode) and Martin Gore (Depeche Mode). Reuniting two original members of the original Depeche Mode lineup over 30 years after Clarke left the band after the release of their debut album Speak & Spell. An EP titled Spock was released (initially exclusively on Beatport) on 30 November 2011. Their second EP, Single Blip, was also released initially exclusive to Beatport on 20 February 2012. Their debut album, titled Ssss, was released on 12 March 2012 by Mute Records. Their third EP, Aftermaths was released on 20 August 2012.

In 2015, Gore released a solo album titled MG as a reference to VCMG.

== Discography ==
=== Studio albums ===
Title	Details	Peak chart positions						
Title	Details	UK	AUT	BEL (WA)	FRA	GER	SWI	US D/E
Ssss	Released: 12 March 2012; Label: Mute; Formats: CD, LP, digital download	81	47	64	159	21	48	10

=== Extended plays ===
- Spock (2011)
- Single Blip (2012)
- Aftermaths (2012)
