= Ssss =

Studio album by VCMG
- Released: 12 March 2012
- Genre: Techno
- Length: 58:50
- Label: Mute
- Producers: Martin L. Gore; Vince Clarke

Singles from Ssss
- 1. "Spock"; 2. "Single Blip"; 3. "Aftermaths"

Professional ratings
Review scores
Source	Rating
AllMusic	3.5/5 stars
Consequence of Sound	C+
The Guardian	3/5 stars
NME	4/5 stars
Pitchfork	6.5/10
Spin	6/10

Ssss is the debut studio album by English electronic music duo VCMG. It was released on 12 March 2012 by Mute Records.

== Critical reception ==
The Guardian wrote that "the analogue synths and electronic squelches could have boomed out of a darkened club at any time in the last two decades, but repeated listens reveal expertise with a sense of fun." The Quietus wrote that "not least of its triumphs is that – without context, without history – it is simply fantastic music to dance to."

== Track listing ==
All tracks are written by Martin L. Gore and Vince Clarke.

No.	Title	Length
1.	"Lowly"	5:27
2.	"Zaat"	6:28
3.	"Spock"	5:40
4.	"Windup Robot"	5:25
5.	"Bendy Bass"	6:04
6.	"Single Blip"	5:47
7.	"Skip This Track"	5:40
8.	"Aftermaths"	6:21
9.	"Recycle"	6:37
10.	"Flux"	5:17
Total length:		58:50

== Personnel ==
Credits adapted from the liner notes of the booklet of Ssss.

- Martin L. Gore – programming, production
- Vince Clarke – programming, production
- Sie Medway-Smith – recording, engineering
- Timothy "Q" Wiles – mixing
- Stefan Betkbat – mastering
- Jan L. Trigg – illustrations
- Paula A. Taylor – design
- Travis Shinn & David Wade – studio photography

== Charts ==
Chart (2012)	Peak position
Austrian Albums (Ö3 Austria)	47
Belgian Albums (Ultratop Wallonia)	64
French Albums (SNEP)	159
German Albums (Offizielle Top 100)	21
Swiss Albums (Schweizer Hitparade)	48
UK Albums (Official Charts)	81
UK Dance Albums (Official Charts)	11
US Heatseekers Albums (Billboard)	13
US Top Dance Albums (Billboard)	10
