= Counterfeit EP =

EP by Martin L. Gore
- Released: June 12, 1989
- Recorded: Sam Therapy (London)
- Genre: Synth-pop
- Length: 24:25
- Label: Mute
- Producers: Martin L. Gore; Rico Conning

Martin L. Gore chronology
Counterfeit EP (1989)	Counterfeit² (2003)

Singles from Counterfeit EP
- 1. "Compulsion" Released: 1989; 2. "In a Manner of Speaking" Released: 1989

Professional ratings
Review scores
Source	Rating
AllMusic	2.5/5 stars
Music Folio	4/5 stars

Counterfeit EP is the first solo recording by the English musician Martin L. Gore, the primary songwriter for the band Depeche Mode.

== Background ==
Released in 1989, Counterfeit is a six-song EP of cover songs, hence the name, implying that the songs were not written by Gore. Counterfeit was recorded during a band hiatus after recording and touring for the album Music for the Masses (1987); bandmate Alan Wilder also recorded and released Hydrology (1988) under the pseudonym Recoil during this period.

Even though the release has the letters "e.p." in its title, Mute Records issued it an album catalogue number (STUMM67 (Note: The English translation for "stumm" is "mute".)).

In France and Germany a promo single for "In a Manner of Speaking" was released.

== Track listing ==
=== CD: Mute / CDSTUMM67 (UK) ===
No.	Title	Writer(s)	Original artist	Length
1.	"Compulsion"	Joe Crow	Joe Crow	5:26
2.	"In a Manner of Speaking"	Winston Tong	Tuxedomoon	4:19
3.	"Smile in the Crowd"	Vini Reilly	The Durutti Column	5:02
4.	"Gone"	Stephen Fellows; Mik Glaisher; Andy Peake; Kevin Bacon	The Comsat Angels	3:28
5.	"Never Turn Your Back on Mother Earth"	Ron Mael	Sparks	3:02
6.	"Motherless Child"		Traditional	2:48
Total length:				24:25

== Credits ==
- Engineered by Rico Conning
- Produced by Martin L. Gore and Rico Conning at Sam Therapy Studios, London
