= Tiny Magnetic Pets =

Irish electronic music group

- Origin: Dublin, Ireland
- Genres: Synth-pop, electropop
- Years active: 2009–present
- Labels: Psychonavigation Records; Happy Robots Records; Vitamin C Records
- Members: Paula Gilmer; Seán Quinn; Eugene Somers

Tiny Magnetic Pets are an Irish synth-pop band formed in Dublin in 2009. The group is composed of vocalist and keyboardist Paula Gilmer, keyboardist and guitarist Seán Quinn, and drummer Eugene Somers. The band's three studio albums draw from influences including 1970s krautrock and 1980s synth-pop. Tiny Magnetic Pets have supported established electronic artists such as Orchestral Manoeuvres in the Dark, Midge Ure and VNV Nation, and have collaborated with Erasure's Vince Clarke and former Kraftwerk member Wolfgang Flür.

== History ==
=== Early recordings and Deluxe/Debris ===
Tiny Magnetic Pets, who took their name from a collectable Japanese toy, were initially composed of the duo of Paula Gilmer and Seán Quinn. Their debut album, Return of the Tiny Magnetic Pets, was released in the summer of 2009. Eugene Somers joined the group shortly thereafter as a percussionist and keyboardist. In the years following Return, the band completed a double album that was ultimately shelved. They instead released the EPs Stalingrad (2015) and The NATO Alphabet (2016). The latter followed live concerts in Britain and Germany, which helped the group develop an audience beyond Ireland. Their song "We Shine" was included on the Electro London Records compilation album, Synth Wave – Volume 1 (2016).

Tiny Magnetic Pets supported former Kraftwerk member Wolfgang Flür at a Dublin concert in January 2016. Musician Rudi Esch of Die Krupps, an acquaintance of both acts, suggested a collaboration between the two. Flür worked with the band on two tracks: "Radio On" and "Never Alone". On the former, Flür contributed a vocal verse, synthesiser parts, and arrangement ideas, building upon a backing track that the group had already recorded. "Never Alone" was built around a synth bass part written by Flür. Both tracks were included on the band's second album, Deluxe/Debris (2017), released on Happy Robots Records. "Radio On" was released as a single in November 2018.

The band also caught the eye of Orchestral Manoeuvres in the Dark (OMD) frontman Andy McCluskey while playing in Düsseldorf. They went on to support OMD on a 20-date tour of Ireland and the UK in autumn 2017. The group were initially invited to support OMD on a single show, but the invitation was then extended to cover the full tour. Before that tour, Tiny Magnetic Pets supported Michael Rother at the Electri_city Conference in Düsseldorf. In 2018, they headlined London's SynthWave2 Live event, where they performed the Visage song "Fade to Grey" alongside its co-writer, Chris Payne. In July 2018, Louder Than War reported that the group would play their first UK headline tour that November.

Tiny Magnetic Pets later supported Midge Ure, including a Birmingham Town Hall concert in February 2020. In May 2023, the group supported VNV Nation on multiple UK dates.

=== Blue Wave and later releases ===
Tiny Magnetic Pets' third studio album, Blue Wave (2020), was completed during the COVID-19 lockdowns of 2020 and released in December of that year. It explores themes of isolation and uncertainty. Erasure's Vince Clarke created a remix of the album track "Automation".

In 2025 Tiny Magnetic Pets released an EP, Harmonious Grey. Hot Press viewed its songs as a move towards a darker sound, and reported that the group had enlisted producer Gareth Jones to work on a fourth studio album. Prior to the August 2026 release of Astralux, The Spill Magazine premiered the music video for "Lost My Guiding Light (Again)" (a reworked track from Deluxe/Debris). The magazine also noted contributions from remixer Paul Dakeyne. The EP contained two remixes of "Low Places".

== Musical style and reception ==
The band's sound has been likened to late-1970s David Bowie, krautrock, and English synth-pop. Electronic Sound noted their use of melodic writing, synth textures and elongated instrumental passages. The band have cited influences including Kraftwerk, OMD, Bowie, Neu!, Can, Brian Eno and Depeche Mode. OMD's Andy McCluskey felt they "manage a fairly purist [electronic] ethos whilst not pastiching the past."

The Arts Desk journalist Thomas H. Green wrote that Paula Gilmer's singing lends emotion to the band's 1980s-inspired electronics. He recognised Tiny Magnetic Pets as forerunners within a small scene devoted to revisiting classic electro-pop. Louder Than War ranked Deluxe/Debris at number 68 on their list of the best albums of 2017.

Andy Page of God Is in the TV reviewed a February 2020 set in Birmingham, praising "the group's success in the marrying of icy synths with the warm humanity of Paula Gilmer's vocals". Classic Pop awarded Blue Wave 3½ stars out of five, noting the three-part title track's blend of synth-pop and krautrock, and commending the songs "City Sleeps Tonight" and "Broken Record".

== Members ==
- Paula Gilmer – lead vocals, synthesisers
- Seán Quinn – synthesisers, guitar, vocals
- Eugene Somers – electronic drums, percussion, synthesisers

Seamus Quinn, brother of Seán, has also contributed bass, guitar and other instruments.

== Discography ==
=== Studio albums ===
- Return of the Tiny Magnetic Pets (2009)
- Deluxe/Debris (2017)
- Blue Wave (2020)

=== EPs ===
- Stalingrad (2015)
- The NATO Alphabet (2016)
- The Politburo Disko (2019)
- Girl in a White Dress (2019; reissued 2023)
- Harmonious Grey (2025)
- Astralux (2026)

=== Remix albums ===
- Re-Mix/Re-Model (2022)
