= Martin Gore =

English singer-songwriter and musician (born 1961)

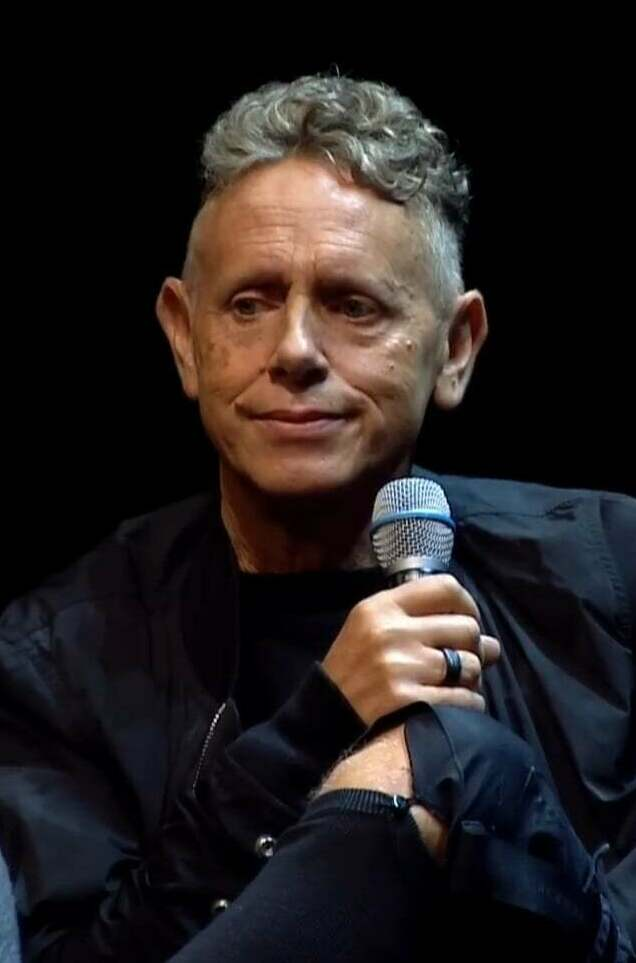
- Gore in 2022

Background information
- Born: Martin Lee Gore; 23 July 1961 (age 65); London, England
- Genres: Electronic; synth-pop; new wave; alternative rock; alternative dance; hard rock
- Occupations: Musician; singer; songwriter; record producer; DJ
- Instruments: Guitar; vocals; keyboards
- Labels: Mute; Sire; Reprise
- Member of: Depeche Mode
- Formerly of: VCMG
- Spouse(s): Suzanne Boisvert (m. 1994; div. 2006) Kerrilee Kaski (m. 2014)
- Website: martingore.com

Martin Lee Gore (born 23 July 1961) is an English musician, singer, and songwriter. He is one of the founding members of the electronic music band Depeche Mode and is the band's main songwriter. He is the band's guitarist and keyboardist, and occasionally provides lead vocals. Gore possesses a tenor singing voice which contrasts with lead vocalist Dave Gahan's dramatic baritone. He is also known for his flamboyant and (sometimes) androgynous stage persona. Gore has also released several solo albums and collaborated with former Depeche Mode member Vince Clarke as part of VCMG.

Gore's songs include themes such as sex, religion and politics. He has said he feels lyrical themes that tackle issues related to solitude and loneliness are a better representation of reality, whereas he finds "happy songs" fake and unrealistic. At the same time, he asserts that the band's music contains "an element of hope".

In 1999, he received the Ivor Novello Award from the British Academy of Songwriters, Composers and Authors for "International Achievement". In 2019, he was given the Moog Innovation Award "for his many contributions to the exploration of sound in popular music". In late 2020, he became a Rock and Roll Hall of Fame member with fellow active Depeche Mode members Dave Gahan and Andy Fletcher, as well as past members Clarke and Alan Wilder. Following the death of Fletcher in May 2022, Gore became the longest-serving member of the band.

== Early life ==
Martin Lee Gore was born in London. His biological father was an African-American G.I. stationed in Britain. Gore was raised by his stepfather David Gore and biological mother Pamela, who both worked at the Ford of Britain motor plant in Dagenham. He believed his stepfather was his biological father until the age of 30, when he learned of his biological father. Gore later met his biological father in the American South.

Gore has described his upbringing as "normal" and "stable" and has said that he was an introvert who preferred to spend time reading alone rather than with school peers. He stated that he enjoyed his time at school and took part in foreign exchange trips. His family briefly lived in Hornchurch during his upbringing before moving to Basildon, where he attended the Nicholas Comprehensive School. During school he was the guitarist in a local band called Norman and the Worms.

Gore taught himself to play keyboard from the 1970s, never receiving formal training. He learned to perform chart hits, figuring out their structures via the magazine Disco 45. He shared a class with Andy "Fletch" Fletcher, Alison Moyet and Perry Bamonte. Gore left Nicholas Comprehensive after completing his A-levels in 1979 and took a job as a bank cashier. During evenings, weekends and any other spare time, he remained involved with Norman and the Worms. He became interested in electronic music upon hearing acts such as Kraftwerk, the Human League and OMD. He borrowed a Korg 700S from a friend, before purchasing a Yamaha CS5, his first synthesizer.

Gore has two younger half-sisters, Karen, born in 1967, and Jacqueline, born in 1968.

== Depeche Mode ==
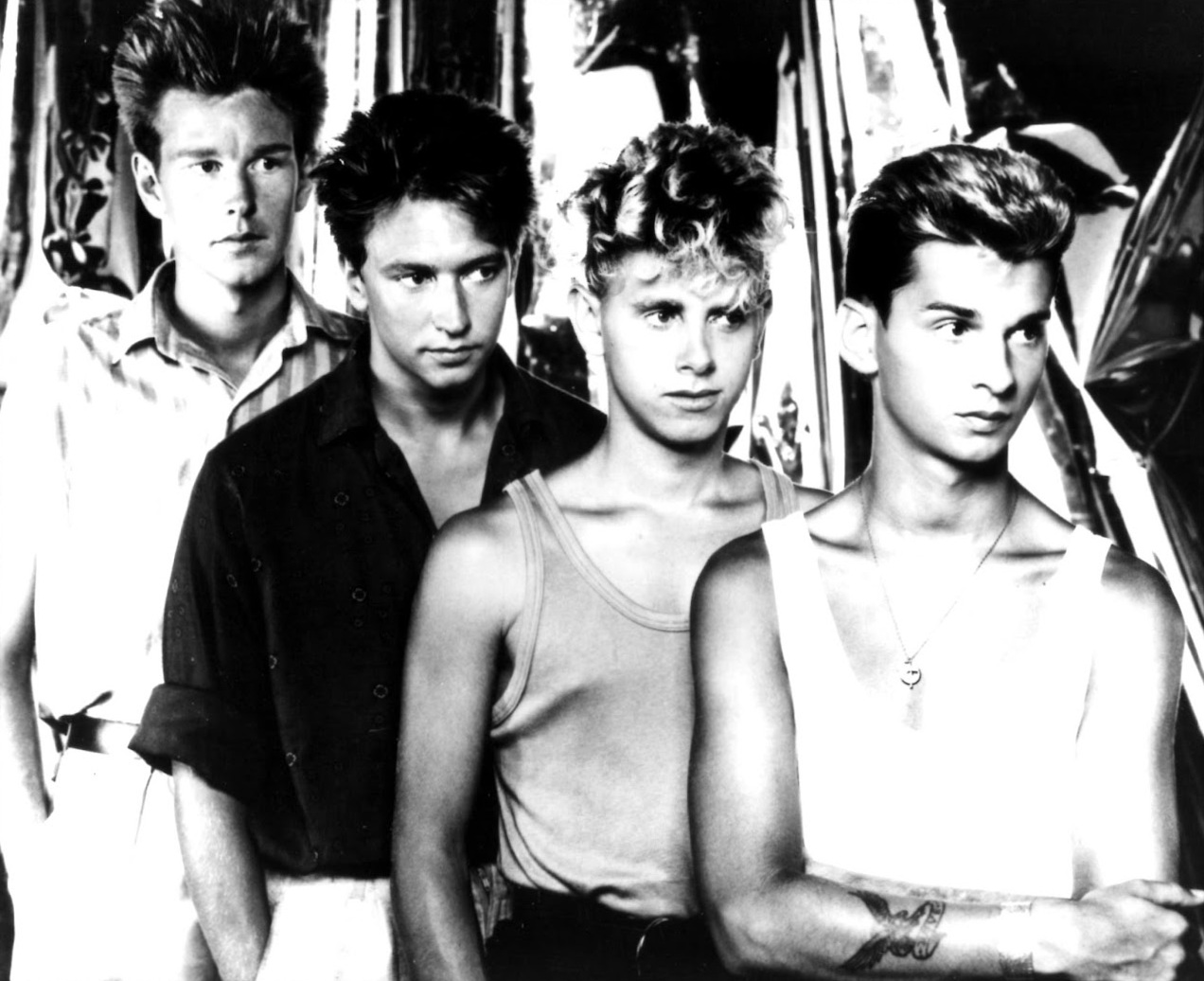
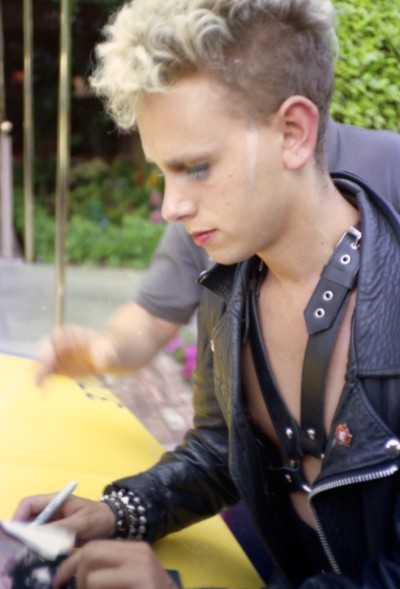
Left: Gore (centre-right) in 1984; Right: Gore in 1986

In 1980, Gore reunited with classmate Andy Fletcher at the Van Gogh club. Fletcher recruited him into his band Composition of Sound, along with Vince Clarke. Soon the band drafted Dave Gahan to be the band's lead singer after hearing him sing "Heroes" by David Bowie. Gore is the band's keyboardist, guitarist on several songs, contributes backing vocals, and occasionally provides lead vocals.

When explaining the band's choice for their name, 'Depeche Mode' (which was taken from French fashion magazine Dépêche Mode), Gore said, "It means 'hurried fashion' or 'fashion dispatch'. I like the sound of that." However, the magazine's name (and hence the band's) correctly translates to something like "Fashion News" or "Fashion Update".

Gore wrote two tracks on Depeche Mode's debut album, Speak & Spell: "Tora! Tora! Tora!" and the instrumental "Big Muff". "Any Second Now (Voices)" features Gore's first lead vocals for the band. When Clarke announced his departure from Depeche Mode in 1981, Gore became the principal songwriter for the band. Songs Gore wrote for Depeche Mode's second album, A Broken Frame (1982), differed musically and lyrically from Clarke's. Gore's writing became gradually darker and more political on subsequent Depeche Mode albums. He sings lead vocals on several of the band's songs, notably ballads – his tenor voice provides a contrast to Gahan's dramatic baritone.

Gore sometimes plays guitar (typically his Gretsch White Falcon or Gretsch Double Anniversary) on Depeche Mode songs. The first time guitar was used as the main instrument was on "Personal Jesus", although he used small guitar parts on previous songs, such as "Behind the Wheel" and "Love, in Itself". Gore's guitar playing developed even more on Songs of Faith and Devotion. In live performances, he switches his keyboards for his guitar on some older Depeche Mode songs, such as "Never Let Me Down Again" and "A Question of Time". In mid-1990, Gore said, "I think in a way we've been at the forefront of new music; sort of chipping away at the standard rock format stations."

== Other work ==
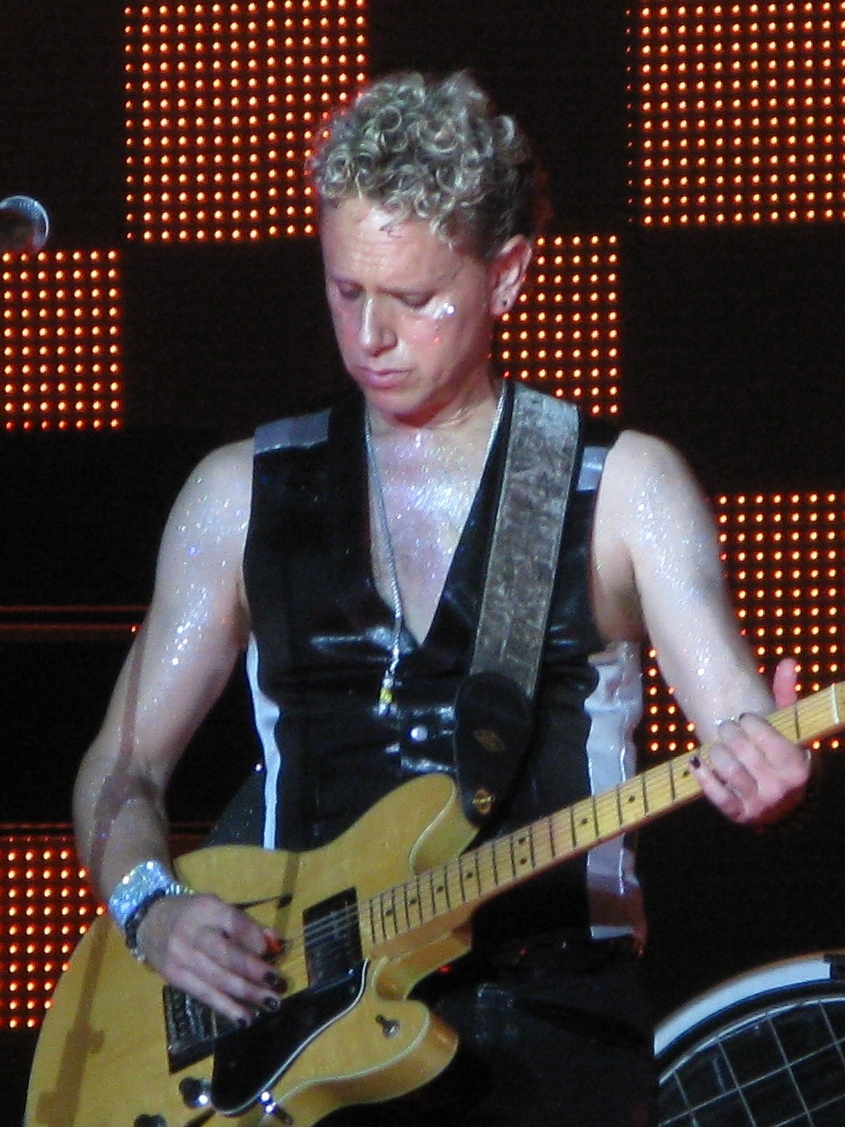
Gore in 2009

Gore has released the following solo albums: Counterfeit EP (1989), Counterfeit² (2003), MG (2015) and The Third Chimpanzee (2021). He covered the song "Coming Back to You" for the Leonard Cohen tribute album Tower of Song: The Songs of Leonard Cohen (1995).

=== VCMG ===
Former Depeche Mode colleague Vince Clarke collaborated with Gore for the first time since 1981 as techno duo VCMG on an instrumental minimalist electronic dance album called Ssss, released on 12 March 2012. The first single, Spock, was originally released worldwide exclusively on Beatport on 30 November 2011. The second, Single Blip, was also released exclusively on Beatport on 20 February 2012, and the third one, Aftermaths, was released on 20 August 2012.

=== MG ===
In late February 2015, several teaser images were displayed on Gore's official Facebook page, citing a hashtag "MGxMG", which was later revealed to be a promotional tool for his new solo studio album, titled MG (named similarly to his previous collaborative album, VCMG, with Vince Clarke from 2012). In a news post on his official website and various social media on 2 March, this confirmation of his new studio album announced its release would be on 27 or 28 April and previewed a track, Europa Hymn, from the new album.

== Electric Ladyboy studio ==
Gore has a personal studio in Santa Barbara with a sizeable collection of Euroracks, Moog and Erica synthesizers (among others), where he has recorded solo work and written music for Depeche Mode.

== Awards ==
On 27 May 1999, Gore was presented with an award by Daniel Miller for "International Achievement" by the British Academy of Songwriters, Composers and Authors at the 44th Ivor Novello Awards.

In 2019, Gore received the Moog Innovation Award "for his many contributions to the exploration of sound in popular music".

Musical pioneer Martin Gore's masterful electronic meditations on the human condition have illuminated the connection between transformative sound and pure emotion for decades. A founding member of the band Depeche Mode, Gore's sensual electronic compositions and introspective lyrics have resonated with faithful audiences around the world and impacted the direction of countless visionary artists from Trent Reznor to Johnny Cash. Gore's enduring ability to connect the rawest aspects of the human experience to the dance floor defined an era and perpetually reminds us what it means to be human through the emotional power of electronic sound.

— Moog

== Personal life ==
Gore lives in Santa Barbara, California. He started dating lingerie designer and model Suzanne Boisvert after meeting in Paris in 1989. They married in August 1994, had three children and divorced in 2006. In June 2014, he married Kerrilee Kaski, with whom he has two daughters.

Gore became a vegetarian for health and moral reasons (along with bandmate Alan Wilder) in 1983.

He had stress-induced seizures during the band's 1993 Devotional Tour and publicly acknowledged his past alcoholism. During a break on the Devotional Tour in Denver, Colorado, he was arrested by local police and fined $50 for holding a loud party in his hotel room.

Gore addressed his sexuality in a 2003 interview with the queer magazine Boyz, stating that he "always felt totally heterosexual". He believed that "everybody assumes that [he is] gay" because of his crossdressing fashion in the 1980s.

He is a supporter of Arsenal Football Club.

== Discography ==
=== Studio albums ===
Title	Details	Peak chart positions							
Title	Details	UK	DEN	FRA	GER	ITA	SWE	SWI	US Dan
Counterfeit²	Release date: 29 April 2003; Label: Mute; Formats: CD, digital download	102	32	52	12	25	23	79	3
MG	Release date: 27 April 2015; Label: Mute; Formats: CD, LP, digital download	50	—	90	7	—	—	28	1
"—" denotes a recording that did not chart or was not released in that territory.

=== Extended plays ===
Title	Details	Peak chart positions		
Title	Details	UK	GER	US
Counterfeit EP	Release date: 12 June 1989; Label: Mute; Formats: CD, LP, cassette	51	41	156
MG Remix EP	Release date: 9 October 2015; Label: Mute; Formats: LP, digital download	—	—	—
The Third Chimpanzee	Release date: 29 January 2021; Label: Mute; Formats: CD, LP, digital download, streaming	—	13	—
The Third Chimpanzee Remixed	Release date: 20 August 2021; Label: Mute; Formats: CD, LP, digital download, streaming	—	—	—
"—" denotes a recording that did not chart or was not released in that territory.

=== Singles ===
Title	Year	Peak chart positions						Album
Title	Year	UK	DEN	FRA	GER	ITA	US Alt	Album
"Compulsion"	1989	—	—	—	—	—	18	Counterfeit EP
"In a Manner of Speaking"	1989	—	—	—	—	—	—	Counterfeit EP
"Stardust"	2003	44	16	92	29	28	—	Counterfeit²
"Loverman"	2003	—	—	—	53	—	—	Counterfeit²
"Europa Hymn"	2015	—	—	—	—	—	—	MG
"Pinking" (Christoffer Berg remix)	2015	—	—	—	—	—	—	MG
"Cross Whisper"	2026	—	—	—	—	—	—	MGxCD+JL=
"—" denotes a recording that did not chart or was not released in that territory.

=== with VCMG ===
- Ssss (Mute, 2012)

=== Other appearances ===
Title	Year	Album	Notes
"Happiness Is Hard to Take" "Don't Know Where I Belong"	1985	Humpe•Humpe	Gore is credited with playing keyboards on two tracks from German female duo Humpe & Humpe's debut album.
"Coming Back to You"	1995	Tower of Song: The Songs of Leonard Cohen	Gore sings lead vocals on a cover version of the Leonard Cohen song.
"Overdrive"	2004	City	Recorded with English female duo Client. Gore sings backing vocals on this track.
"Cloud Nine"	2004	Item (EP)	Recorded with duo Onetwo (Claudia Brücken und Paul Humphreys). Gore co-wrote the song with Brücken, and he also plays guitar on this track. Also appears on the Onetwo album Instead (2007), and Brücken's compilation Combined (2011).
"Wonderful Life"	2006	The Sweet Escape	Recorded with American singer Gwen Stefani. Gore plays guitar on this track.
"Master and Servant"	2009	3	Cover of the 1984 Depeche Mode hit, recorded with French band Nouvelle Vague. Lead vocal by Melanie Pain, with Gore on backing vocals.
"Milakia"	2010	Back to Light	Recorded with Bomb the Bass. Gore wrote, produced and performed on this instrumental track.
"Once You Say"	2010	Industrial Complex	Recorded with Nitzer Ebb. Gore sings backing vocals on this track.
"The Unstoppable Collision"	2011	Nameless	Recorded with the band Compact Space (Daryl Bamonte, Florian Kraemmer, and Depeche Mode session drummer Christian Eigner). Gore plays guitar on this track.
"Uni Rec"	2011	Univrs	Recorded with German artist Alva Noto, aka. Carsten Nicolai. Gore provided "sounds (Siren Synth – Mutesound)" on this track.
"Man Made Machine"	2011–12	Man Made Machine	Recorded with Motor. Gore sings lead vocals on both EP version (2011), and on the album of the same name (2012).
"Only You & You Alone"	2016	Another Fall from Grace	Backing vocals on the album from the English band The Mission.
"TOS2020"	2020	TOS2020	Single by ReMission International. Gore listed among "Musical / Vocal Contributors"
"Subterraneans"	2022	Subterraneans EP	Vocals. Music by Alva Noto, saxophone by William Basinski.

=== Remixes ===
- 1994 Spirit Feel – "Rejoice" (Mystic Span mix)
- 1995 Garbage – "Queer" (The Most Beautiful Woman in Town mix)
- 1999 ON – "Soluble Words" (Sublingual remix)
- 2003 Señor Coconut and His Orchestra – "Smooth Operator" (In-Disguise remix)
- 2013 Diamond Version – "Get Yours" (Martin L. Gore remix)
- 2022 Jean-Michel Jarre – "Brutalism Take 2"

== Sources ==
- Malins, Steve. Depeche Mode: Black Celebration: The Biography. André Deutsch, 2007. ISBN 978-0-233-00178-4
- Miller, Jonathan. Stripped: Depeche Mode 2003, 2004, Omnibus Press ISBN 1-84449-415-2
- Tobler, John. NME Rock 'N' Roll Years (1st ed.). London: Reed International Books Ltd, 1992. CN 5585. ISBN 0-600-57602-7
