= OSC OSCar =

Synthesizer

OSCar
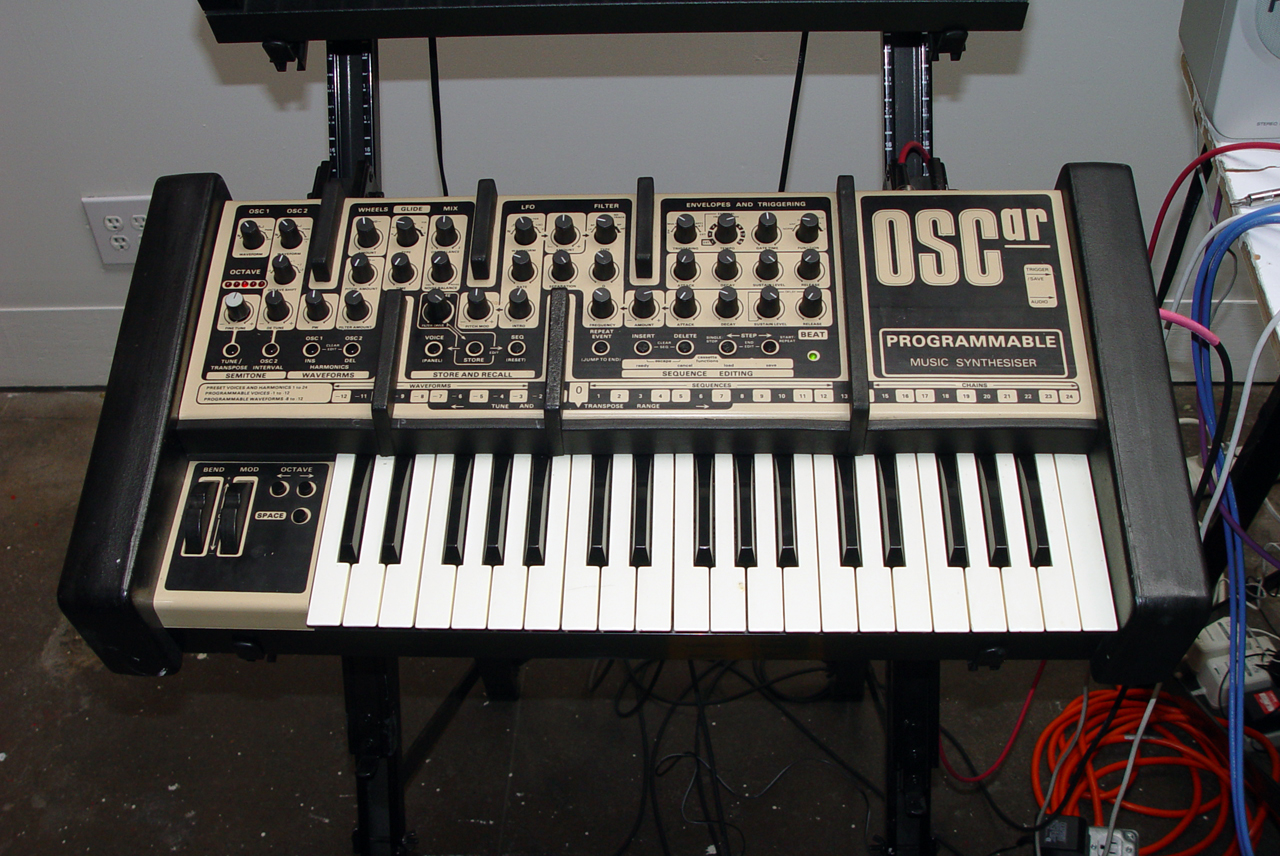
- OSCar
- Manufacturer: Oxford Synthesiser Company
- Dates: 1983 - 1985

Technical specifications
- Polyphony: monophonic with limited duophonic capabilities
- Timbrality: 1
- Oscillator: 2 digital oscillators
- LFO: 1 triangle/sawtooth/square/sample & hold
- Synthesis type: Analog/Digital Hybrid Subtractive Additive
- Filter: 1 resonant multi-mode (lowpass/bandpass/hipass) filter
- Attenuator: 2 ADSR
- Storage memory: 24 patches

Input/output
- Keyboard: 37 keys
- External control: MIDI

The OSCar was a synthesizer manufactured by the Oxford Synthesiser Company from 1983 to 1985. It was ahead of its time in several ways and its later versions were among the few mono-synths of its time to have MIDI. Around 2000 were made.

== History ==
When synthesizer manufacturer Electronic Dream Plant folded in 1982, Chris Huggett went on to form the Oxford Synthesiser Company. The OSCar synthesizer was launched in 1983. Chris Huggett designed the electronics while independent product designer Anthony Harrison-Griffin was responsible for the unique look and build of the OSCar.

== Design and features ==
Harrison-Griffin's use of distinctive black rubberized components to protect the controls and main casing became one of the instrument's most distinctive visual features. He even built a dummy 3-pin mains socket into the ends to safely store the plug.

While the basic structure of the OSCar is the common subtractive synthesis model, it has many unusual features and design quirks. The main difference from other synthesizers of the time was its digital oscillators and control system. The oscillators have an array of standard wave shapes including triangle, sawtooth, square and a variable pulse-width modulation, but the digital system also provides additive synthesis. New waveforms can be created by changing the amplitudes of up to 24 harmonics, widening the available sound palette in comparison with purely analogue synths. The two oscillators can either be played together monophonically, or the OSCar can be set in a duophonic mode where they keyboard controls one oscillator and the sequencer the other.

The filter consists of two 12 dB/Oct analog filters that can be combined into either a 24 dB low pass, a 24 dB high pass or a 12 dB bandpass filter. A similar design had been known from other analog synths of the era, such as the Roland Jupiter-6, but the OSCar has its own unique twist on it, by having a "Separation" control that allowed separate cutoff frequencies for the filters. The resulting two resonance peaks can give a unique "vocal" character.

The OSCar has an elementary sequencer. In duophonic mode it allows the user to play a monophonic lead whilst a sequence plays simultaneously. Many sequencers at the time could only play notes of a fixed length but on the OSCar it was possible to lengthen individual notes or insert rests.

== Users ==
Although only 2000 OSCars were made they found their way into many professional hands. Ultravox used one for the solo on "Love's Great Adventure", and it is used for the bass on Stevie Wonder's "Skeletons", Jean-Michel Jarre's Revolutions Overture, and "Do They Know It's Christmas?".

== Successors ==
The GForce impOSCar is a software emulation of the OSC OSCar.

Paul Whittington Music acquired the OSCar trademark from Chris Huggett's estate together with the Oxford Synthesiser Company in 2025, and has announced a hardware re-creation of the instrument for release in 2027.

== See also ==
- Electronic Dream Plant
- Akai Professional
- Novation Digital Music Systems
