= Chris Huggett =

British engineer and inventor (1949–2020)

- Born: 1949
- Died: 22 October 2020 (age 71)
- Occupations: Engineer, designer

Chris Huggett (1949 - 22 October 2020) was a British engineer and designer who co-founded Electronic Dream Plant (EDP), founded Oxford Synthesiser Company and who was also a design consultant for Novation Digital Music Systems, Paul Whittington Group Ltd, and other manufacturers of audio technology.

== Electronic Dream Plant ==
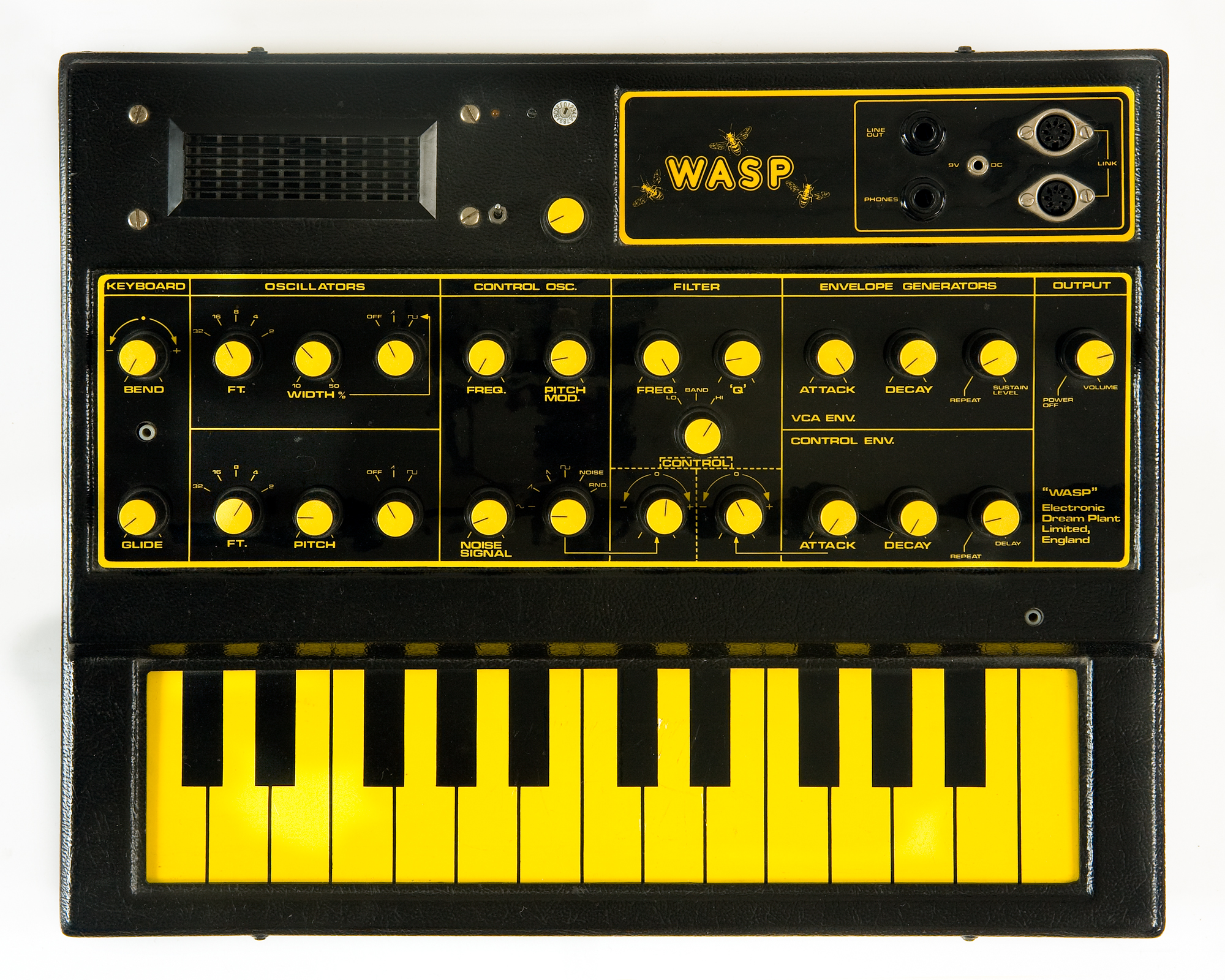
EDP WASP

In 1977, Huggett had been working for Ferrograph, for 3M in their digital multi-track division, and as a freelance studio maintenance engineer. He met up with synthesist Adrian Wagner (a descendant of the German composer Richard Wagner), who had ideas for an inexpensive synthesiser. Electronic Dream Plant (commonly abbreviated to EDP), a British synthesiser manufacturing firm in Oxfordshire was formed.

Huggett designed EDP's most successful product, the Wasp, a synthesiser with a hybrid digital VCO / analog VCF design. Employing a unique contact keyboard (with no moving parts), the Wasp was priced at £199 (about 1090 GBP today), which was less than half the price of any comparable synth at the time.

Huggett later designed the Spider sequencer and the Gnat synthesiser before EDP's demise in the end of 1981 or 1982.

== Oxford Synthesiser Company ==
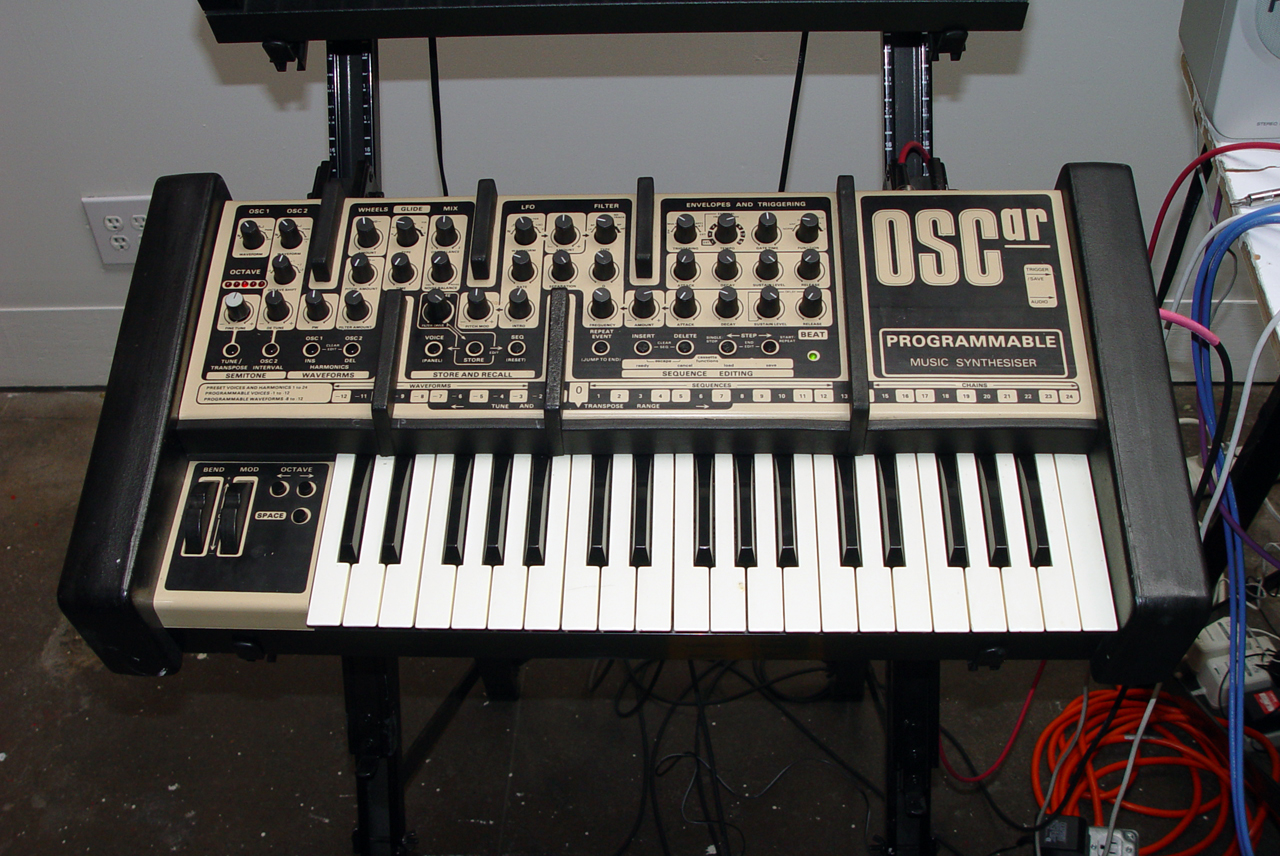
OSC OSCar

After EDP, Huggett went on to form Oxford Synthesiser Company (OSC) with financing and management from his parents. He designed the OSC OSCar with Paul Wiffen and Anthony Harris-Griffin. The OSCar was intended to be an affordable yet sophisticated performance synthesiser with state-of-the-art sounds. The OSCar was a more substantial synthesiser than the Wasp, with two digital oscillators and a full-size three-octave keyboard. The OSCar was also one of the first digitally programmable synthesisers, and included both an arpeggiator and a step sequencer.

== Akai ==
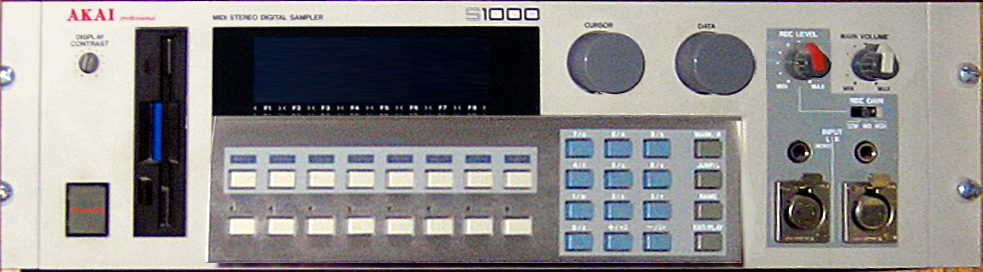
Akai S1000

Huggett later moved on to Akai, where he wrote the operating system for the Akai S1000 sampler alongside David Cockerell, who designed the hardware. Huggett remained at Akai for successive models of Akai's rackmount sampler line, including the S3200, whose operating system he completed in 1993.

== Novation Digital Music Systems ==
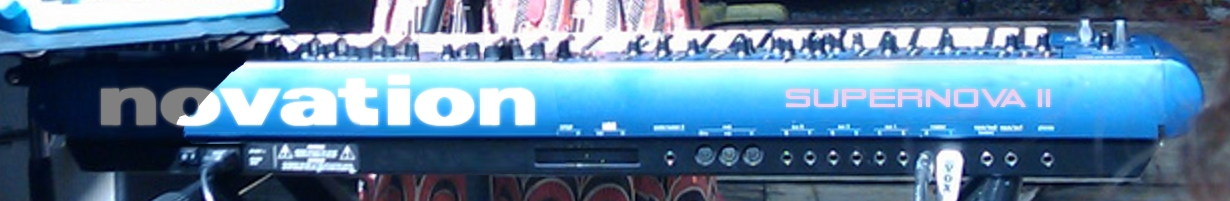
Supernova II (rear)

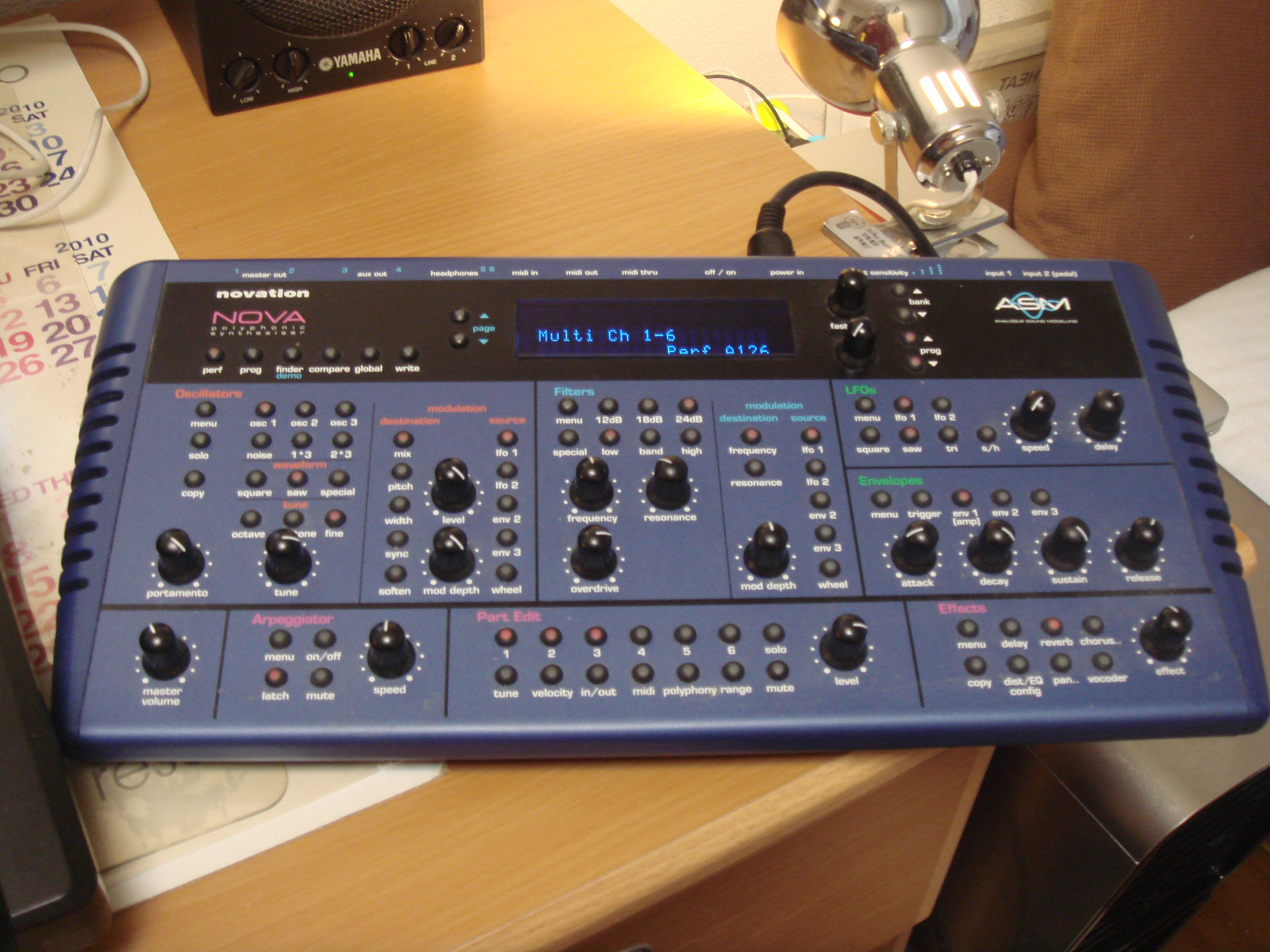
Nova

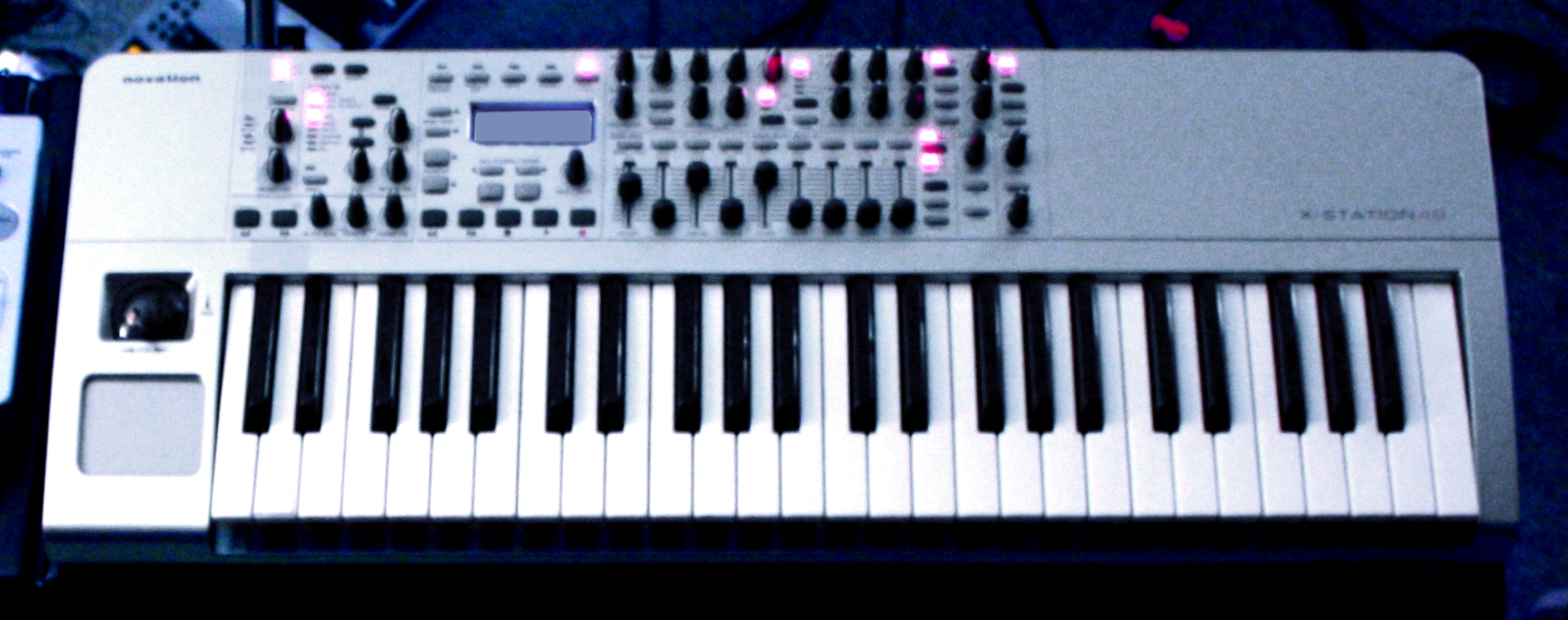
X-Station 49

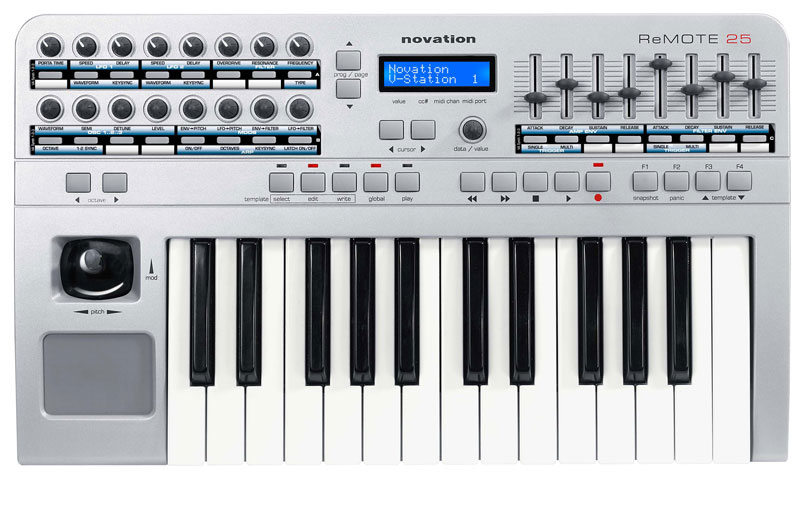
Remote 25

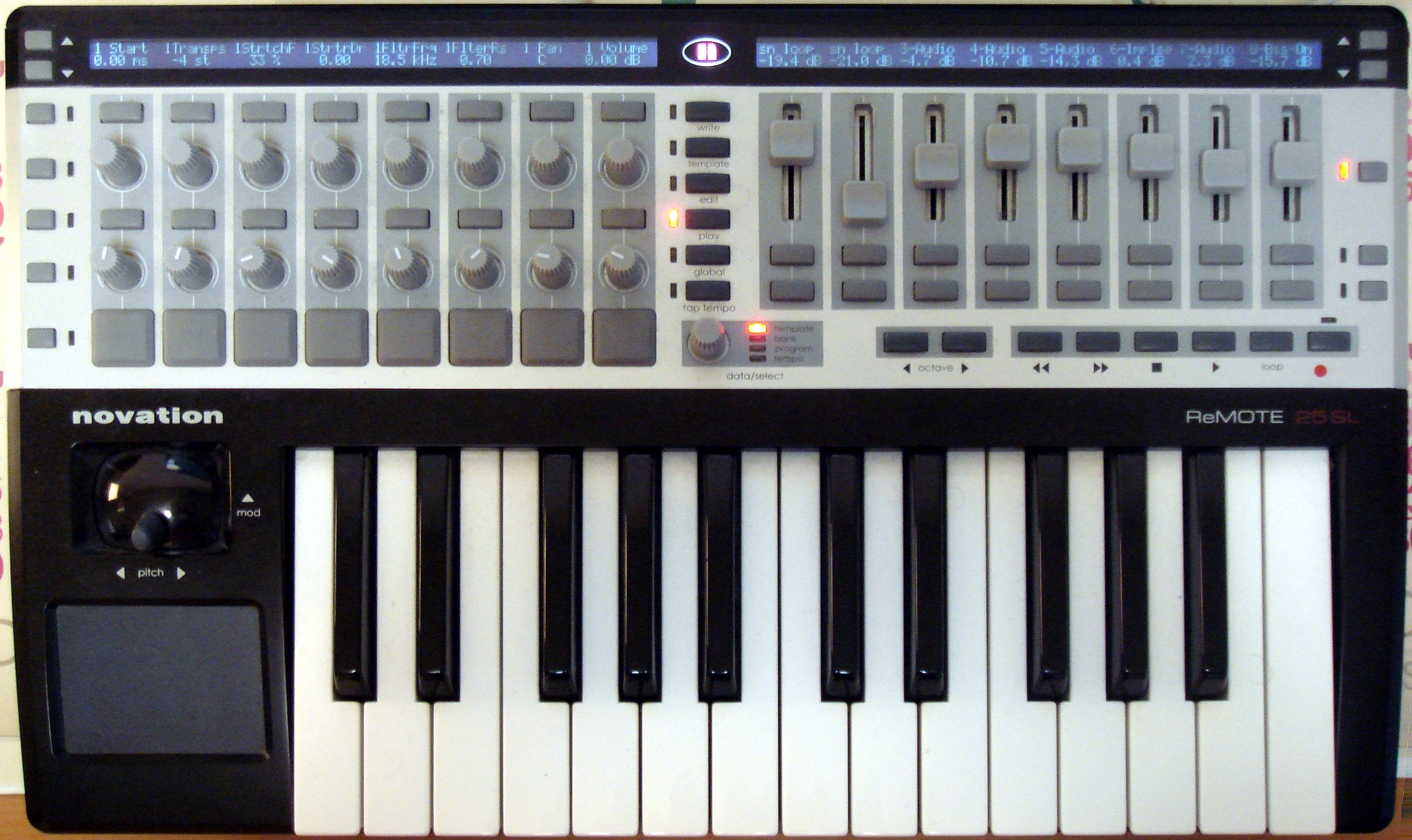
Remote 25 SL

While working for Akai, Huggett provided advice and support to Novation's founders, working on the development of the Bass Station, which used similar oscillators and filters to the Wasp. He later joined Novation full time to design the Novation Supernova.

Huggett's involvement with Novation continued through many successive hardware synths and MIDI controllers, including the Nova family of synths, the Bass Station II, the Peak and Summit synths, and the ReMOTE & ReMOTE SL series of controllers.

== Paul Whittington Group ==
Chris Huggett's final commission was the Mantis synthesiser, a hybrid synth that revisited and modernised aspects of the WASP and OSCar. He specified the control layout and produced an early working prototype before illness forced him to delegate its completion.

== Death ==
Huggett passed away on 22 October 2020, of cancer.

== See also ==
- Electronic Dream Plant
- AKAI Professional
- Novation Digital Music Systems
