= The Third Chimpanzee (EP) =

EP by Martin Gore
- Released: 29 January 2021
- Studio: Electric Ladyboy (Santa Barbara)
- Genre: Electronic
- Length: 23:18
- Label: Mute
- Producer: Martin Gore

Martin Gore chronology
| MG (2015) | The Third Chimpanzee (2021) |

Professional ratings
Aggregate scores
| Source | Rating |
|---|---|
| Metacritic | 69/100 |
Review scores
| Source | Rating |
| AllMusic | 3/5 stars |
| Clash | 8/10 |
| Laut.de | 4/5 stars |
| Mojo | 3/5 stars |
| Musikexpress | 4/6 stars |
| Paste | 7.5/10 |
| Pitchfork | 7.3/10 |
| PopMatters | 7/10 |
| Rolling Stone (fr) | 3.5/5 stars |
| The Scotsman | 3/5 stars |

The Third Chimpanzee is the fourth solo recording by Martin Gore, the primary songwriter for the band Depeche Mode. The tracks were recorded in Santa Barbara in Gore's home studio and released 29 January 2021 by Mute. It was his first solo release in six years.

== Background ==
This is Gore's first solo release since Depeche Mode's induction into the Rock & Roll Hall of Fame. The record consists of five instrumental tracks with no vocal parts named after different primate species. The EP title refers to the Jared Diamond’s 1991 book of the same name, in which Diamond, an evolutionary biologist and popular-science author, discusses the origins of human behaviour by showing the similarities between human behaviour and that of primates. The album cover was performed by a capuchin monkey.

In the statement Gore explained: "The first track I recorded had a sound that wasn't human. It sounded primate-like. I decided to name it 'Howler', after a monkey. Then, when it came time to name the EP, I remembered reading the book The Rise and Fall of the Third Chimpanzee. It all made sense to call it that, as the EP was made by one of the third chimpanzees."

== Critical reception ==
At Metacritic, which assigns a normalised rating out of 100 to reviews from mainstream critics, The Third Chimpanzee received an average score of 69, based on six reviews, indicating "generally favorable reviews".

Paul Simpson of AllMusic commented, "Like all of Gore's solo releases, The Third Chimpanzee unmistakably feels like a side project. It's intriguing to hear what sounds and moods he can create outside of the context of his band, but even compared to the more fully realized MG, the EP merely sounds tentative. However, it's worth noting that the striking cover art was painted by Pockets Warhol, a capuchin monkey, which is fascinating." Saby Reyes-Kulkarni of Paste Magazine stated, "On his new EP The Third Chimpanzee, Gore once again reaches for his usual trademarks: the clanging of synthetic marimba-like textures..., siren wails that conjure images of sentient machines crying out in torment..., throbbing bass interlaced with ticking beats... Absent are the pinging synth arpeggios that mimic nylon guitar strings. (Or is it vice-versa?) Either way, Gore does splash the tracks with some typically spartan electric guitar flourishes. Longtime followers of Gore’s work, though, might find themselves thinking they’ve heard all of this before—many times. They wouldn’t be wrong." Robert Ham of Pitchfork observed, "The Third Chimpanzee is his darkest—and strongest—solo work yet. The five instrumentals, all of them named after different primates, have the overdriven sting of vintage industrial, with bone-shuddering bass and the nastiest synth eruptions that he has elicited since Depeche Mode's 1997 album Ultra. The mood is feral and erotic yet curiously comfortable, as if Gore discovered his old bondage gear in the back of a closet and found that it still fits."

== Track listing ==
All tracks are written by Martin Gore.

| No. | Title | Length |
|---|---|---|
| 1. | "Howler" | 4:56 |
| 2. | "Mandrill" | 4:01 |
| 3. | "Capuchin" | 3:53 |
| 4. | "Vervet" | 8:30 |
| 5. | "Howler's End" | 2:00 |
| Total length: | | 23:18 |

== Charts ==
| Chart (2021) | Peak position |
|---|---|
| Austrian Albums (Ö3 Austria) | 47 |
| German Albums (Offizielle Top 100) | 13 |
| Scottish Albums (Official Charts) | 33 |
| Swiss Albums (Schweizer Hitparade) | 11 |
| UK Album Downloads (Official Charts) | 28 |
| UK Independent Albums (Official Charts) | 5 |
