= Cross Whisper =

Single by MG x CD + JL =
- Released: 20 October 2026
- Genre: Electronic
- Length: 5:46
- Label: Mute
- Producers: Martin Gore; Cliff Damavandi

"Cross Whisper" is a single by electronic music project MG x CD + JL =, a project founded by English musician Martin Gore and Cliff Damavandi, released on 20 October 2026 by Mute Records. It was produced by Martin Gore and Cliff Damavandi.

The song will be released on 12-inch vinyl on 4 December 2026, with remixes by ANNA, Regis, Vera Grace, Pye Corner Audio and boothnavy.

== Background ==
The song took inspiration from Martin Gore's experiences in which birds would appear when someone close to him died. Gore discussed several instances where this happened, saying "when my mother died, a bird came, and again when my dog passed. When my cat died, a bird came into the house and flew downstairs into the room where it slept!”. The lyrics were written by Cliff Damavandi, who was inspired by Gore's experiences, saying he "could feel the story as well as hear it,” finding "an otherness that compelled me to write the words”.

The song features lead vocals from Gore, Damavandi with backing vocals provided by Arielle Sitrick and Gore's daughter, Johnnie Lee. It was mixed by Italian record producer Marta Salogni, who previously worked with Gore on his band Depeche Mode's album Memento Mori (2023).

== Track listing ==
No.	Title	Length
1.	"Cross Whisper"	5:46
Total length:		5:46

== Personnel ==
Credits adapted from Tidal.

- Martin Gore - composer, producer, lead vocals, synthesizers
- Cliff Damavandi - composer, producer, lead vocals, synthesizers
- Johnnie Lee - backing vocals
- Arielle Sitrick - backing vocals
- Marta Salogni - mixing
