= Electronic Dream Plant =

British synthesizer manufacturer

Electronic Dream Plant (EDP) was a small British synthesizer manufacturer, active during the late 1970s and early 1980s. At the time their products were not particularly successful commercially. In later years products like the "WASP" became prized by collectors for their unique sound, and later synthesizer companies have successfully copied some of their design elements.

== Background ==
The company was formed in 1977 by musician Adrian Wagner and electronics designer Chris Huggett. The pair wanted to design an inexpensive instrument that would trade off cosmetic appeal and user interface against cost and sound quality. They realised that transistor-transistor logic (TTL) could provide a stable sound source, and managed to persuade Argent's Keyboards, a London music shop, to finance £10,000 for putting the synth into production.

== Products ==
=== Wasp ===
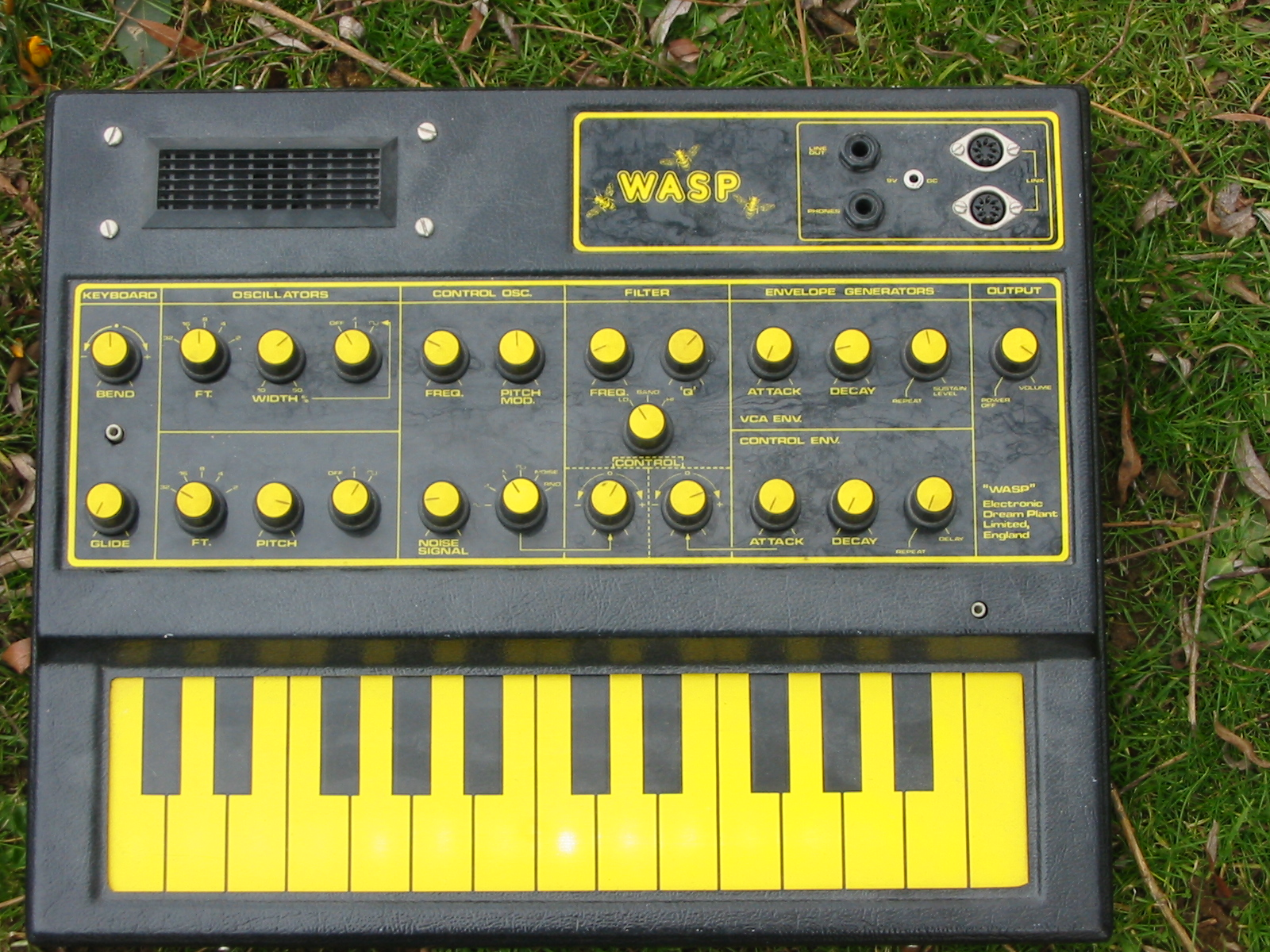
The EDP Wasp

Launched in 1978 at a price of £199 (equivalent to £1,442 in 2023), the Wasp was EDP's best-received product. It was named after its black-and-yellow colour scheme. For cost reasons, it did not have a mechanical keyboard; instead, it used flat conductive copper plates, hidden under a silk-screened vinyl sticker. This alienated some players who thought the instrument lacked the expression present with a real keyboard. It was also difficult to use in live settings, and according to Gerald Casale of Devo, the synth would play itself when exposed to sweat. Despite these flaws, the Wasp was fairly advanced technologically. It was one of the first commercially available synthesisers to adopt digital technology, which at the time was just beginning to become a standard. It also utilised a proprietary system for connecting several Wasp synthesisers together, predating MIDI by several years. (Note: The digital interface should not, however, be confused with MIDI, even though similar DIN plugs are used (7-pin DIN instead of the 5-pin DIN which MIDI standardized to).) The Wasp had a tiny internal speaker, which gave the instrument a distinctive sound, though it could also be amplified externally. Eurythmics' David A. Stewart recorded the Wasp by miking its internal speaker.

Architecturally, the wasp is a dual digital oscillator synth, with dual envelopes and a single, switchable (low-, band-, and high-pass) CMOS-based filter.

=== Wasp Deluxe ===
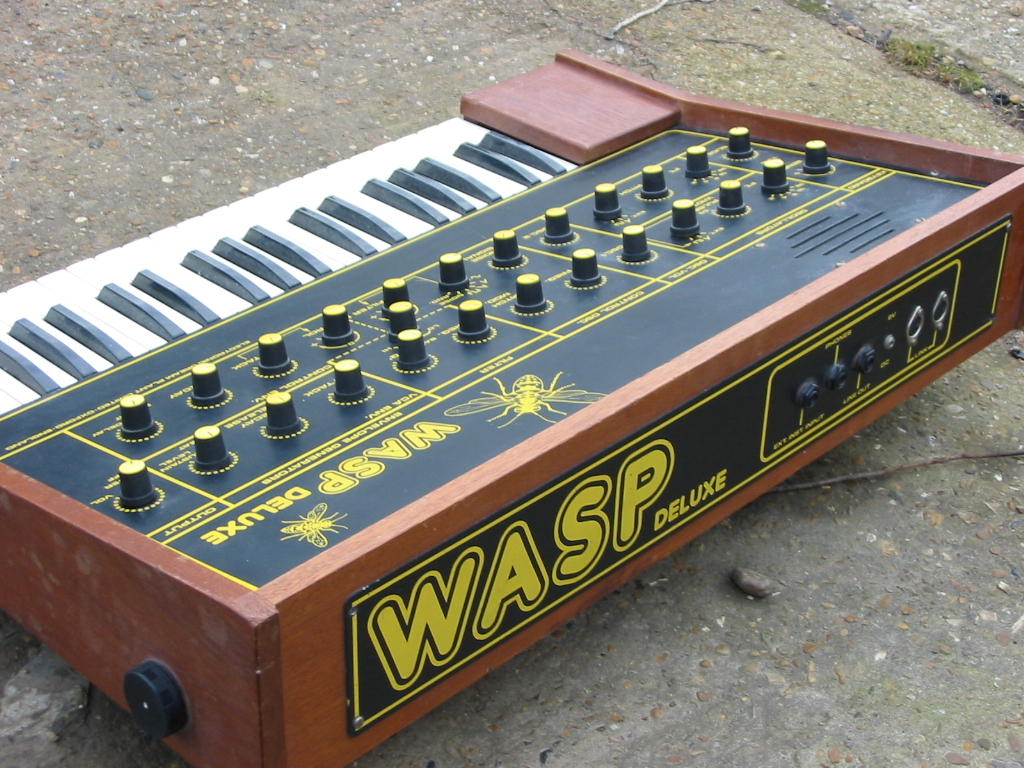
The EDP Wasp Deluxe, with its more professional keyboard

The last Wasp revision was named the Deluxe. It offered virtually the same circuitry (but on a redesigned PCB) to the other two Wasps, but with the additional moving keyboard. The deluxe also featured an external audio input to its filter, and mix controls for the Oscillators, and external input levels. Rumour states that around 80 deluxes were produced before the demise of EDP.

The Deluxe commands an increased price with collectors, presumably because of its further increased rarity, and its improved playability.

=== Spider ===
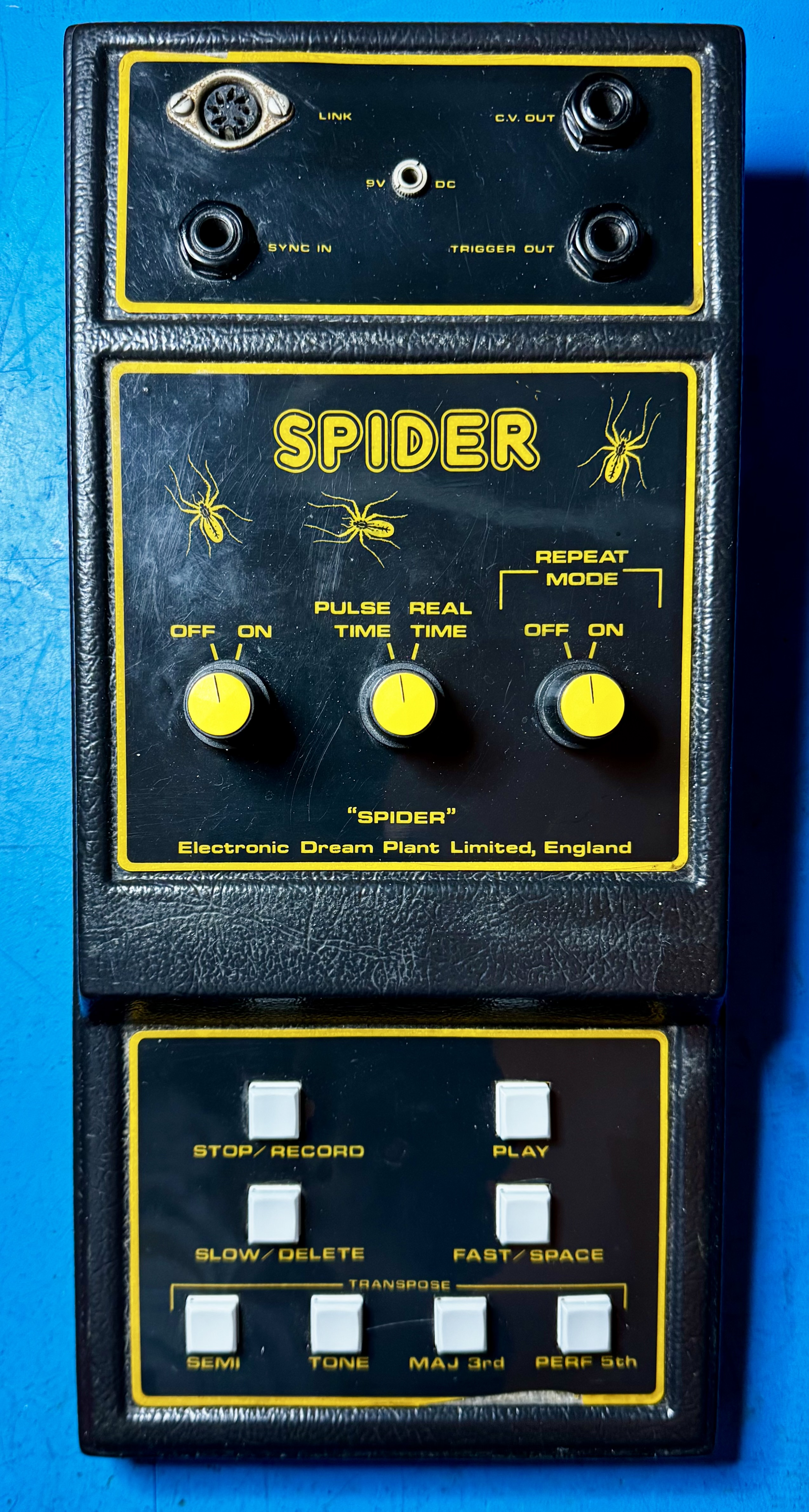
The EDP Spider

The Spider was a 252-step digital sequencer (most analogue sequencers at the time had 8 or 16 steps). The unit was designed by Huggett and Oxford University engineering technician Steve Evans. It was built in the same style as the standard Wasp, outputting both LINK (to drive EDP products) and CV/gate information for use with standard analogue synths. It was programmable in real time or by individual step entry.

=== Gnat ===
The Gnat was a single-oscillator version of the Wasp. Anthony Harrison-Griffin, an independent product designer was responsible for the design and build of the Gnat, drawing on the basic design and colour scheme of the already well established Wasp.

=== Caterpillar ===
The Caterpillar was a 3-octave master keyboard which could control up to four Wasps or Gnats using EDP's proprietary digital control system. It was released in 1980, after Huggett had left the company, though he contributed to the design as a freelancer. The unit suffered because each Wasp typically had a distinctive sound owing to the variable quality of components used to build it.

=== Keytar ===
The Keytar was "heavily modded Wasp that was built into a guitar form" which, although prototyped, never went into production.

== Legacy ==
The company suffered financial losses during 1979, leading to Huggett leaving the company early the following year. It filed for bankruptcy after debts to component suppliers increased beyond a sustainable level. Wagner formed a follow-up company, Electronic Dream Plant (Oxford) which produced the Gnat. He was ousted from the company in 1981, and formed Wasp Synthesizers, which produced a very limited run of Special versions of the Wasp and Gnat. This breakaway company lasted less than a year and its products are even rarer.

- Wasp Special

This 'wooden' wasp used the same membrane keyboard as the standard version, but with a new black and gold colour scheme, and the loss of the internal batteries and speaker. An internal mains transformer was added.

- Gnat Special

Again, as with the wasp special, a wooden case, different colour scheme, and the loss of the internal speaker.

EDP closed in 1982. Huggett, went on to co-form another British company, OSC, with Paul Wiffen producing the OSCar synthesizer in collaboration with Anthony Harrison-Griffin, an independent product designer responsible for the unique look and build of the OSCar.

In 1992, Novation developed a new synth with Huggett based on the legacy of the Wasp and Gnat, the Bass Station. This was expanded and redeveloped in the 2010s as the Bass Station 2, a widely available monosynth competing with instruments such as the Arturia MiniBrute and the Korg MS20 mini. The Bass Station 2 shares key features with the EDP Wasp synthesizer.

Later Novation products like the PEAK continued to embrace the philosophy of the digital "Oxford Oscillator" pioneered by EDP.

In 2017 the Jasper DIY became the first real Wasp clone with the 'touch' keyboard and similar electronic architecture.

In 2019 Behringer marketed a modernized hardware clone of the WASP, sans keyboard, at a very competitive price point.

== Related companies ==
- Oxford Synthesiser Company (OSCar)
- Groove Electronics (Stinger -essentially two wasp voices in a midi controlled case & MIDI2CV Midi to Link converter) note: contrary to popular belief, the stinger was not made from two butchered wasp boards
- Kenton Electronics (Midi to Link daughter board, for their range of midi-cv units)
- Novation, co-developers with Chris Huggett since the 1990s.
