= Counterfeit 2 =

Counterfeit²

Studio album by Martin L. Gore
- Released: April 28, 2003
- Recorded: Electric Ladyboy (Santa Barbara)
- Genres: Alternative rock; electronica
- Length: 42:59
- Label: Mute
- Producers: Andrew Phillpott; Paul Freegard

Martin L. Gore chronology
Counterfeit EP (1989)	Counterfeit² (2003)	MG (2015)

Professional ratings
Aggregate scores
Source	Rating
Metacritic	59/100
Review scores
Source	Rating
AllMusic	3/5 stars
Blender	2/5 stars
The Guardian	2/5 stars
Mojo	3/5 stars
Pitchfork	6.9/10
Q	2/5 stars
Release Magazine	8/10
Uncut	6/10

Counterfeit 2 (stylized as Counterfeit²) is the first full-length studio album by Martin L. Gore, the primary songwriter for the band Depeche Mode, and his second release (his first being the Counterfeit EP in 1989).

Released April 28, 2003 in Europe and April 29, 2003 in the US, Counterfeit² is an album featuring 11 covers of songs that Gore considered influential to his own compositions for Depeche Mode. He recorded this album around the same time as Dave Gahan recorded his first solo album Paper Monsters, after the Exciter Tour ended, and around the same time Andy Fletcher produced Client's self-titled debut album. Counterfeit² is a very synth heavy album compared to Depeche Mode's prior two albums, Exciter and Ultra, and includes a song sung completely in German ("Das Lied vom einsamen Mädchen").

Gore also went on a brief tour consisting of a few concerts in Europe and Los Angeles.

== Track listing ==
=== CD: Mute / CDSTUMM214 (UK) ===
No.	Title	Writer(s)	Original artist	Length
1.	"In My Time of Dying"	Blind Willie Johnson	Blind Willie Johnson	4:24
2.	"Stardust"	David Essex	David Essex	3:08
3.	"I Cast a Lonesome Shadow"	Hank Thompson	Hank Thompson	4:51
4.	"In My Other World"	Julee Cruise; Louis Tucci	Julee Cruise	3:53
5.	"Loverman"	Nick Cave	Nick Cave and the Bad Seeds	7:02
6.	"By This River"	Brian Eno; Hans-Joachim Roedelius; Dieter Moebius	Brian Eno	4:01
7.	"Lost in the Stars"	Maxwell Anderson; Kurt Weill	From the musical Lost in the Stars	2:52
8.	"Oh My Love"	John Lennon; Yoko Ono	John Lennon	3:33
9.	"Das Lied vom einsamen Mädchen"	Werner R. Heymann; Robert Gilbert	Hildegard Knef	5:25
10.	"Tiny Girls"	David Bowie; Iggy Pop	Iggy Pop	3:20
11.	"Candy Says"	Lou Reed	The Velvet Underground	4:35
Total length:				42:59

== Personnel ==
- Andrew Phillpott – producer
- Paul Freegard – producer
- Anton Corbijn – art direction, sleeve photo
- Jennifer Secord – supplementary photos
- Peter Gordeno – piano on "Lost in the Stars", Fender Rhodes on "Das Lied Von Einsamen Mädchen" and backward solo on "Tiny Girls"
- Martin L. Gore – vocals, synthesizer, guitar, arranger
- Kris Solem – mastering

== Singles ==
=== "Stardust" ===
- A single for the track "Stardust" was released two weeks prior to the release of Counterfeit². It included the B-sides "Life Is Strange" and a video of "Left Hand Luke and the Beggar Boys" (both are two soul songs written by Marc Bolan from the 1973 T. Rex album Tanx), along with various remixes of "Stardust" and "I Cast a Lonesome Shadow".

=== Loverman EP² ===
- After Counterfeit², saw the release of Loverman EP² which included mixes of "Loverman" and "Das Lied vom einsamen Mädchen". There was also a version with a DVD which included footage of Gore's Milan show on April 30, 2003, and an interview. It was released in November in the UK and was not released in the US.
