= Songs of Silence (Vince Clarke album) =

Studio album by Vince Clarke
- Released: 17 November 2023
- Genres: Ambient; drone; experimental
- Length: 42:40
- Label: Mute
- Producer: Vince Clarke

Vince Clarke chronology
Deeptronica (2009)	Songs of Silence (2023)

"I could have gone on forever, I could have not stopped. I was enjoying the process so much and wasn't thinking about anyone else hearing it. But hearing it develop in my studio, in my head, learning new tricks—that's been the best thing about this. I was in a state of shock, actually, when Mute said they wanted to release this album."

— Clarke on recording Songs of Silence

Songs of Silence is a studio album by British electronic musician Vince Clarke, released through Mute Records on 17 November 2023. It has received positive reviews from critics. The album was recorded during the COVID-19 pandemic with Clarke building all songs around a modular synthesizer. Each track is based on a single note that is held throughout the composition, with other musical elements added to it.

The album does not include the synth-pop styles that Clarke has explored in his earlier career and instead has somber tones that reflect his anxiety around the world during COVID and responds to his grief at losing friends and former bandmates during the recording, with sadness reflected in the sounds.

== Reception ==
According to the review aggregator Metacritic, Songs of Silence received "generally favorable reviews" based on a weighted average score of 74 out of 100 from five critic scores. Editors at AllMusic rated this album 3.5 out of 5 stars, with critic Marcy Donelson writing that "Songs of Silence showcases instincts and inventiveness well beyond that of your typical synth-instrumentals diversion".

Writing for The Guardian, Chal Ravens rated this album 3 out of 5 stars and noted the sense of dread and anxiety that the music conveys. Editors at Louder Than War chose this for Album of the Week and critic Paul Scott-Bates speculated that ambient music listeners will call this "a faultless piece of genius" and characterized it as "sheer flawlessness" and "an album so perfect and so precise that it is impossible to fault", and additionally wrote that calling it "a classic of the modern age would be no exaggeration".

Ben Hogwood of musicOMH rated this release 4 out of 5 stars and compared this to Clarke's synth-pop music stating that "Clarke here uses drones as his musical currency, rather than intricate synth lines or memorable chorus hooks" and continued that these "soundscapes are often as craggy and imposing as his close-up black and white album packshot image, rising before the observer at daunting angles or closing in like the outskirts of a dense forest".

Editors at Paste included Songs of Silence among the best albums of the week, with critic Robert Ham calling it "a series of mood pieces with each one glowing from within as if energized by a core of molten rock or radioactive material". In Resident Advisor, Alastair Shuttleworth wrote that this "compelling debut", "Clarke sustains a mood somewhere between unease and awe" that "holds its own with a coherent and convincing voice" amongst other electronic.

Fiona Shepherd of The Scotsman gave this 3 out of 5 stars, stating that this work is in "stark contrast" to Clarke's other music, being "a symphony of drones, oscillation and moody synthscapes, all carved from a lockdown obsession with the Eurorack modular synth system".

== Track listing ==
All tracks are written by Vince Clarke except "The Lamentations of Jeremiah", written by Clarke and Reed Hays.

1. "Cathedral" – 4:21
2. "White Rabbit" – 4:40
3. "Passage" – 3:10
4. "Imminent" – 4:56
5. "Red Planet" – 4:40
6. "The Lamentations of Jeremiah" – 4:23
7. "Mitosis" – 4:51
8. "Blackleg" – 3:06
9. "Scarper" – 3:47
10. "Last Transmission" – 4:46

== Personnel ==
- Vince Clarke – modular synthesizer, production, mixing
- Stefan Betke – mastering
- Eugene Richards – photography
- Paul A. Taylor – art direction

== Charts ==
Chart performance for Songs of Silence
Chart (2023–2024)	Peak position
German Albums (Offizielle Top 100)	54
Polish Albums (ZPAV)	69
Scottish Albums (Official Charts)	28
UK Album Downloads (Official Charts)	16
UK Independent Albums (Official Charts)	6
UK Independent Albums Breakers Chart	1
UK Official Physical Albums Chart	22

== See also ==
- 2023 in British music
- List of 2023 albums
