= Oxford Synthesiser Company =

British synthesizer manufacturer

The Oxford Synthesiser Company (OSC) was a small British synthesizer manufacturer, active during the early 1980s. It was founded in 1982 by electronics design engineer Chris Huggett, with Paul Wiffen, after Electronic Dream Plant folded.

In 1984, the company introduced the OSC OSCar, a synthesizer that "raised eyebrows" in part due to its "monstrous" appearance. Nevertheless, the keyboard became popular with musicians including Stevie Wonder, Keith Emerson, and Jean-Michel Jarre, and bands such as Ultravox and The Legendary Pink Dots.

Despite the initial success of the OSCar, the company was unable to compete with the likes of Yamaha, which introduced the DX7. OSC went out of business in 1986.

== Products ==
- OSC OSCar

== Related companies ==
- Electronic Dream Plant (EDP)
- Novation, co-developers with Chris Huggett since the 1990s
