= MG (album) =

2015 album by Martin Gore

Studio album by Martin Gore
- Released: 27 April 2015
- Recorded: March 2014 – February 2015
- Studio: Electric Ladyboy (Santa Barbara)
- Genre: Electronic
- Length: 54:11
- Label: Mute
- Producer: Martin Gore

Martin Gore chronology
Counterfeit² (2003)	MG (2015)	The Third Chimpanzee (2021)

MG is the second solo studio album by English musician and Depeche Mode member Martin Gore, and the first to include self-penned material rather than cover-versions. It was released on 27 April 2015 by Mute Records and consists of sixteen electronic instrumentals. A music video for "Europa Hymn", directed by M-I-E and incorporating illustrations by Jan L. Trigg, was released to YouTube in February 2015.

== Reception ==
Professional ratings
Aggregate scores
Source	Rating
AnyDecentMusic?	6.6/10
Metacritic	70/100
Review scores
Source	Rating
AllMusic	3.5/5 stars
Exclaim!	6/10
The Guardian	3/5 stars
Mojo	3/5 stars
MusicOMH	3.5/5 stars
Pitchfork	7.2/10.0
PopMatters	7/10
Q	3/5 stars
Record Collector	3/5 stars
Rolling Stone	3.5/5 stars

At Metacritic, which assigns a normalised rating out of 100 to reviews from mainstream critics, MG received an average score of 70, based on 12 reviews, indicating "generally favorable reviews".

== Track listing ==
All tracks are written by Martin Gore.

No.	Title	Length
1.	"Pinking"	2:20
2.	"Swanning"	2:57
3.	"Exalt"	4:15
4.	"Elk"	2:01
5.	"Brink"	3:03
6.	"Europa Hymn"	3:15
7.	"Creeper"	3:26
8.	"Spiral"	3:59
9.	"Stealth"	4:16
10.	"Hum"	4:09
11.	"Islet"	3:15
12.	"Crowly"	4:15
13.	"Trysting"	3:16
14.	"Southerly"	4:00
15.	"Featherlight"	2:26
16.	"Blade"	3:08
Total length:		54:11

MG Remix EP

EP by Martin Gore
- Released: 9 October 2015
- Recorded: April–September 2015
- Studio: Various
- Genre: Electronic
- Length: 35:29
- Label: Mute
- Producer: Martin Gore

== MG Remix EP ==
Martin Gore announced a remix EP, available on double 12″ vinyl and digital download via Mute. The EP includes remixes by Andy Stott, Virgil Enzinger and Christoffer Berg, alongside two previously unreleased tracks. In association with BitTorrent, Gore also launched a remix competition for the track "Featherlight". The winning remix is included on the digital release of Gore's EP. Described by Pitchfork as "a careful sculpting of electricity and air", the album creates an absorbing and emotional sonic landscape. The deadline for submission was August 21, with a winning remix announced August 31.

MG Remix EP disc
No.	Title	Length
1.	"Europa Hymn" (Andy Stott remix)	7:02
2.	"Brink" (Virgil Enzinger remix)	5:32
3.	"Pinking" (Christoffer Berg remix)	8:44
4.	"De Nada"	4:30
5.	"Gifting"	4:31
6.	"Featherlight" (Mantra of Machines remix)	5:10
Total length:		35:29

== Studio equipment ==
According to interviews with Gore published in Electronic Musician (July 2015) and Keyboard Magazine (July 2015) as well as a video interview on his official website, Gore mentioned some instruments (mainly synthesizers, modular synthesizer systems, drum machines) and other equipment he used in the album recording:

- Eurorack modular system
- Elka Synthex
- Gleeman Pentaphonic
- 88 DOTCOM system
- Aries modular system
- Digisound 80 modular system
- Synton Fenix
- ARP 2600
- ARP Solina String Ensemble
- Arturia MiniBrute
- Elektron Analog Four
- Elektron Analog Rytm
- Dewanatron Swarmatron
- Octave Plateau Voyetra Eight polyphonic synthesizer module
- Moog Minimoog Voyager
- Moog Memorymoog
- Tiptop Audio Trigger Riot
- Noise Engineering Zularic Repetitor drum module
- Solid State Logic mixing console
- Apple Logic Pro (DAW)

and other equipment.

== Personnel ==
Credits adapted from the liner notes of MG.

- Martin Gore – art direction, design, production
- Q – mixing, additional programming (tracks 5, 7–9, 11, 12, 15)
- Will Hinton II – studio assistance
- Stefan Betke – mastering
- Jonathan Kessler – management
- Paul A. Taylor – art direction
- Jan L. Trigg – illustration

== Charts ==
Chart (2015)	Peak position
Austrian Albums (Ö3 Austria)	37
Belgian Albums (Ultratop Flanders)	108
Belgian Albums (Ultratop Wallonia)	68
French Albums (SNEP)	90
German Albums (Offizielle Top 100)	7
Scottish Albums (Official Charts)	71
Swiss Albums (Schweizer Hitparade)	28
UK Albums (Official Charts)	50
UK Dance Albums (Official Charts)	13
UK Independent Albums (Official Charts)	7
US Top Dance Albums (Billboard)	1
US Independent Albums (Billboard)	27
