= Yazoo discography =

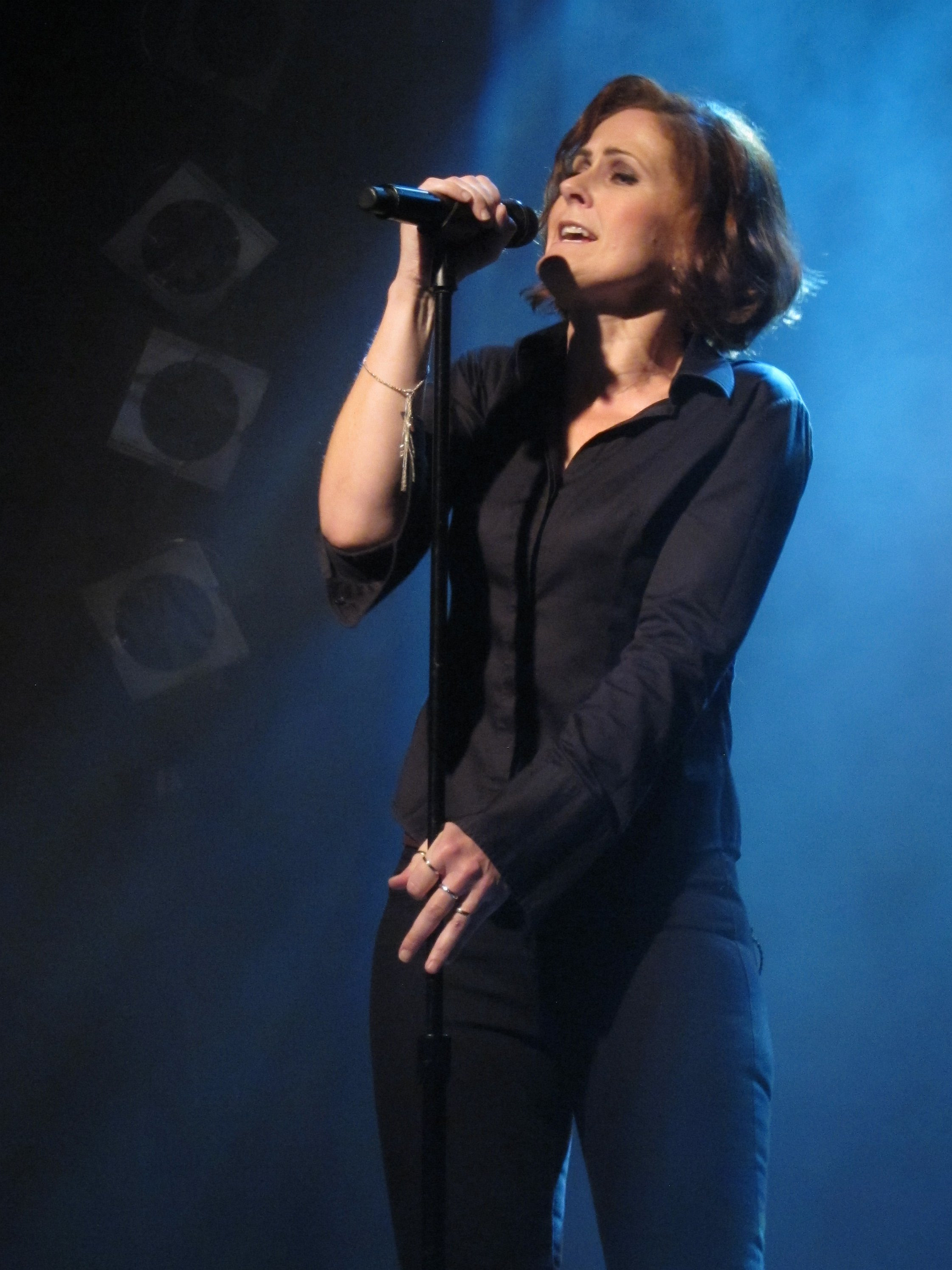
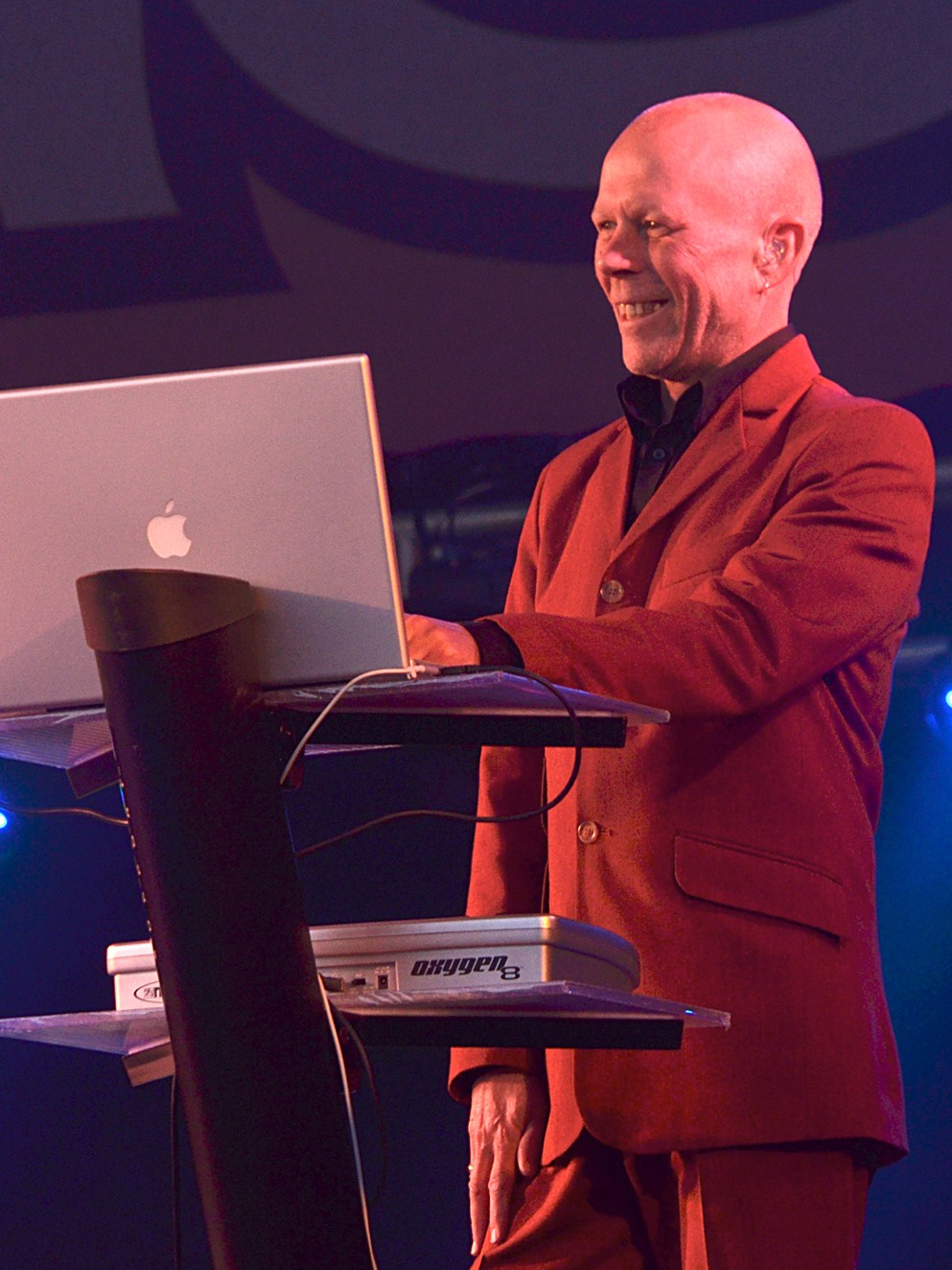
- Alison Moyet (left) in 2013 and Vince Clarke in 2011
- Studio albums: 2
- EPs: 2
- Live albums: 1
- Compilation albums: 6
- Singles: 9

The discography of English synth-pop duo Yazoo consists of two studio albums, one live album, six compilation albums, two extended plays (EPs) and nine singles. Their debut studio album, Upstairs at Eric's, achieved platinum status both in the United Kingdom and the United States of America.

Yazoo had success during the early part of the decade with two hit studio albums and five hit singles. Since their split in 1983, there has been some commercial success with releases of compilation albums and remixed singles across Europe and the US.

== Albums ==
=== Studio albums ===
List of studio albums, with selected chart positions and certifications
| Title | Details | Peak chart positions | | | | | | | | | | Certifications |
| Title | Details | UK | UK Indie | AUS | CAN | GER | NLD | NZ | SPA | SWE | US | Certifications |
|---|---|---|---|---|---|---|---|---|---|---|---|---|
| Upstairs at Eric's | Released: 20 August 1982; Label: Mute | 2 | 1 | 10 | 49 | 14 | 9 | 9 | 4 | 11 | 92 | BPI: Platinum; RIAA: Platinum |
| You and Me Both | Released: 4 July 1983; Label: Mute | 1 | 1 | 21 | 33 | 15 | 11 | 1 | 22 | 4 | 69 | BPI: Gold |

=== Live albums ===
List of live albums, with selected chart positions
| Title | Details | Peak chart positions | | |
| Title | Details | UK | SWE | US Electro |
|---|---|---|---|---|
| Reconnected Live | Released: 27 September 2010; Label: Mute | 177 | 57 | 21 |

=== Compilation albums ===
List of compilation albums, with selected chart positions and certifications
| Title | Details | Peak chart positions | | | | Certifications |
| Title | Details | UK | UK Indie | SCO | SWE | Certifications |
|---|---|---|---|---|---|---|
| Only Yazoo: The Best Of | Released: 6 September 1999; Label: Mute | 22 | 5 | 37 | 28 | BPI: Silver |
| In Your Room | Released: 26 May 2008; Label: Mute | 193 | — | — | — | |
| Essential | Released: 18 June 2012; Label: Mute | — | — | — | — | |
| The Collection | Released: 17 September 2012; Label: Music Club Deluxe | 169 | — | — | — | |
| Four Pieces | Release date: 26 October 2018; Label: Mute | — | — | — | — | |
| Three Pieces | Release date: 2 November 2018; Label: Mute | — | 12 | — | — | |
"—" denotes items that did not chart or were not released in that territory.

== Extended plays ==
List of extended plays, with selected chart positions and certifications
| Title | Details | Peak chart positions |
| Title | Details | UK |
|---|---|---|
| Nobody's Diary | Released: 12 May 2008; Label: Mute | 100 |
| Reconnected | Released: May 2008; Label: Mute | 116 |

== Singles ==
List of singles, with selected chart positions and certifications, year released and album name
| Title | Year | Peak chart positions | | | | | | | | | | Certifications | Album |
| Title | Year | UK | UK Indie | AUS | BEL | GER | IRE | NLD | SPA | US | US Dance | Certifications | Album |
|---|---|---|---|---|---|---|---|---|---|---|---|---|---|
| "Only You" | 1982 | 2 | 1 | 7 | 39 | 72 | 5 | — | 19 | 67 | — | BPI: Silver | Upstairs at Eric's |
| "Don't Go" | 1982 | 3 | 1 | 6 | 1 | 4 | 4 | 6 | 4 | — | 1 | BPI: Silver | Upstairs at Eric's |
| "Situation" (Note: "Situation" only appears on the US and Canadian edition of Upstairs at Eric's.) | 1982 | — | 20 (Note: "Situation" was not released in the United Kingdom, but charted due to import sales.) | — | 7 | — | — | 18 | — | 73 | 1 | | Upstairs at Eric's |
| "The Other Side of Love" | 1982 | 13 | 1 | 86 | 9 | 35 | 11 | 30 | 14 | — | — | | non-album single |
| "Nobody's Diary"/ "State Farm" (Note: "State Farm" appeared as the B-side of some single releases and on some album releases of You and Me Both. Most US Dance Club play was for "State Farm".) | 1983 | 3 | 1 | 17 | 20 | 18 | 5 | — | 10 | — | 1 | BPI: Silver | You and Me Both |
| "Situation '90" | 1990 | 14 | 1 | 167 | 38 | 36 | — | — | — | — | 46 | | Upstairs at Eric's (re-issue) |
| "Only You '99" | 1999 | 38 | 3 | — | — | — | — | — | — | — | — | | Only Yazoo: The Best Of |
| "Situation '99" | 1999 | 154 | 36 | — | — | — | — | — | — | — | 1 | | Only Yazoo: The Best Of |
| "Don't Go '99" | 1999 | — | — | — | — | — | — | — | — | — | 16 | | Only Yazoo: The Best Of |
"—" denotes items that did not chart or were not released in that territory.

== Other charted songs ==
List of other charted songs, with selected chart positions, showing year released and album name
| Title | Year | Peak chart positions | Album |
| Title | Year | UK | Album |
|---|---|---|---|
| "Only You" (re-entry) | 1983 | 92 | Upstairs at Eric's |
| "Don't Go" (re-entry) | 2009 | 190 | Upstairs at Eric's |
