= The Collection (Yazoo album) =

Compilation album by Yazoo
- Released: 10 September 2012
- Genre: Synth-pop
- Length: 133:06
- Label: Music Club Deluxe
- Producer: E.C. Radcliffe; Yazoo

Yazoo chronology
Essential (2012)	The Collection (2012)	Four Pieces (2018)

Professional ratings
Review scores
Source	Rating
Daily Express	4/5 stars

The Collection is a two-disc compilation album by English synth-pop duo Yazoo, released under licence from Mute Records by Music Club Deluxe, a division of Demon Music Group, in September 2012. It features all of the band's singles, remixes, and their two studio albums Upstairs at Eric's and You and Me Both in entirety (with the exception of "I Before E Except After C" and "In My Room" from the former and “And On” from the latter).

== Track listing ==
=== Disc one ===
No.	Title	Writer(s)	Length
1.	"Only You"	Vince Clarke	3:12
2.	"Situation"	Clarke, Alison Moyet	2:22
3.	"Don't Go"	Clarke	3:05
4.	"Nobody's Diary"	Moyet	4:30
5.	"Bring Your Love Down (Didn't I)"	Moyet	4:40
6.	"Happy People"	Clarke	2:56
7.	"Bad Connection"	Clarke	3:17
8.	"Good Times"	Moyet	4:20
9.	"Mr. Blue"	Clarke	3:25
10.	"Ode to Boy"	Moyet	3:35
11.	"Tuesday"	Clarke	3:19
12.	"Too Pieces"	Clarke	3:11
13.	"Goodbye '70s"	Moyet	2:31
14.	"The Other Side of Love"	Clarke, Moyet	3:04
15.	"Situation (US 12" Mix)"		5:44
16.	"Only You (1999 Version)"		2:53

=== Disc two ===
No.	Title	Writer(s)	Length
1.	"Situation" (Hercules and Love Affair remix)		5:10
2.	"Sweet Thing"	Moyet	3:42
3.	"Softly Over"	Clarke	3:59
4.	"Winter Kills"	Moyet	4:02
5.	"Anyone"	Moyet	3:24
6.	"Midnight"	Moyet	4:20
7.	"Nobody's Diary" (extended)		6:07
8.	"State Farm"	Clarke, Moyet	3:35
9.	"Unmarked"	Clarke	3:34
10.	"Walk Away from Love"	Clarke	3:18
11.	"The Other Side of Love" (remixed extended version)		5:23
12.	"Ode to Boy" (Das Shadow re-work)		8:19
13.	"Don't Go" (Todd Terry Freeze mix)		6:10
14.	"Goodbye '70's" (Black Light Odyssey remix)		5:01
15.	"Winter Kills" (Electronic Periodic's Sub/Piano remix)		5:12
16.	"Situation" (original US dub mix)		5:46
