= In Your Room (Yazoo album) =

Box set by Yazoo (Yaz)
- Released: May 26, 2008
- Recorded: 1981–1983
- Genres: Synth-pop; electropop
- Labels: Mute; Sire
- Producers: E.C. Radcliffe; Yazoo

Yazoo (Yaz) chronology
Only Yazoo – The Best of Yazoo (1999)	In Your Room (2008)	Reconnected Live (2010)

Professional ratings
Review scores
Source	Rating
AllMusic	4/5 stars

In Your Room is a box set by English synth-pop duo Yazoo, also known in North America as Yaz. It is the first Yazoo release since Only Yazoo, a 1999 greatest hits compilation album.

The set was released by Mute Records (in North America by Sire Records) on May 26, 2008, and contains four discs. In Your Room contains Yazoo's only two studio albums (Upstairs at Eric's and You and Me Both) in stereo and 5.1 remasters. Also included is a disc of B-sides and remixes. The fourth disc is a DVD containing the music videos for "Don't Go", "The Other Side of Love", "Nobody's Diary", "Situation" (1990 version) and "Only You" (1999 version). Clarke's current Erasure partner Andy Bell contributed a new remix of "Nobody's Diary" to the Nobody's Diary EP, released prior to the box set. Afterwards there was also the release of the Reconnected EP.

== Reunion concerts ==
The box set was issued in conjunction with a short Yazoo tour in Europe and the U.S. It was the first time band members Vince Clarke and Alison Moyet performed together in over twenty-five years and the first time any songs from You and Me Both were played live, as the duo split shortly before the release of that album in 1983. It was also the first time Yazoo toured North America.

Clarke has said about the concerts:

"It's been really good going back to these songs after such a long while. Many of them have never been played live. I'm looking forward to performing them with Alison for all the fans who've enjoyed our music through the years but never had a chance to see Yazoo in concert."

Moyet has stated:

"Playing this material live is not about revision for me, it is about finishing something we started – writing, recording, performing. Three parts of a whole. A salmon cycle. It's like going home."

== Track listing ==
=== Disc 1 (CD): Upstairs at Eric's (Remastered) ===
1. "Don't Go"
2. "Too Pieces"
3. "Bad Connection"
4. "I Before E Except After C"
5. "Midnight"
6. "In My Room"
7. "Only You"
8. "Goodbye '70s"
9. "Tuesday"
10. "Winter Kills"
11. "Bring Your Love Down (Didn't I)"

=== Disc 2 (CD): You And Me Both (Remastered) ===
1. "Nobody's Diary"
2. "Softly Over"
3. "Sweet Thing"
4. "Mr. Blue"
5. "Good Times"
6. "Walk Away from Love"
7. "Ode to Boy"
8. "Unmarked"
9. "Anyone"
10. "Happy People"
11. "And On"

=== Disc 3 (CD): B-Sides and Remixes ===
1. "Situation"
2. "Situation" (extended version)
3. "Don't Go" (re-mix)
4. "Don't Go" (re-re-mix)
5. "Situation" (U.S. 12" mix)
6. "Situation" (U.S. 12" dub)
7. "The Other Side of Love"
8. "The Other Side of Love" (12" remix)
9. "State Farm"
10. "Nobody's Diary" (extended)
11. "State Farm" (extended)
12. "Situation" (re-recorded)

=== Disc 4 (DVD) ===
1. "2 albums, 4 singles and that was it..."

A short film featuring new interviews with Vince Clarke and Alison Moyet, and exclusive archive footage.
Promotional videos

1. "Don't Go"
2. "The Other Side of Love"
3. "Nobody's Diary"
4. "Situation" (1990)
5. "Situation" (alternative version) (1990)
6. "Only You" (1999)

Yazoo at the BBC

1. "Only You" (Top of the Pops) 29 April 1982
2. "Only You" (Cheggers Plays Pop) 24 May 1982
3. "Don't Go" (Top of the Pops) 15 July 1982
4. "Don't Go" (Saturday Live) 24 July 1982
5. "Don't Go" (Top of the Pops) 12 August 1982
6. "The Other Side of Love" (Top of the Pops) 25 November 1982
7. "The Other Side of Love" (Top of the Pops) 9 December 1982
8. "Nobody's Diary" (Top of the Pops) 19 May 1983
9. "Nobody's Diary" (Top of the Pops) 2 June 1983

==== 5.1 DTS (24bit/96khz), AC3 and 2.0 LPCM 24bit/48kHz Mixes ====
1. Upstairs at Eric's
2. You and Me Both

== Chart performance ==
Chart (2008)	Peak position
UK Albums (OCC)	193
