= Only Yazoo =

1999 album by English duo Yazoo

Greatest hits album by Yazoo (Yaz)
- Released: 6 September 1999
- Recorded: 1981–1983
- Genre: Synth-pop; electropop
- Length: 40:32
- Label: Mute; Reprise
- Producer: E.C. Radcliffe; Yazoo

Yazoo (Yaz) chronology
You and Me Both (1983)	Only Yazoo (1999)	In Your Room (2008)

Professional ratings
Review scores
Source	Rating
AllMusic	4/5 stars
Rolling Stone	4/5 stars

Only Yazoo is a greatest hits album released by English synth-pop duo Yazoo in 1999. At the point of its release, the band had been broken up for over 15 years.

The collection includes the best bits of their two studio albums – Upstairs at Eric's and You and Me Both as well as non-album tracks like "State Farm". The album also included a number of new remixes that were featured on re-issued singles.

The album's title is a play on their biggest single, "Only You". In the US and Canada, however, where the band were known as Yaz, the album was called The Best Of, and was released by Reprise Records, like Sire, also owned by Warner Music Group.

== Track listing ==
=== CD: Mute / CD MUTEL 6 (UK) ===
1. "Only You" – 3:12
2. "Ode to Boy" – 3:38
3. "Nobody's Diary" – 4:31
4. "Midnight" – 4:20
5. "Goodbye 70's" – 2:33
6. "Anyone" – 3:25
7. "Don't Go" – 3:06
8. "Mr Blue" – 3:26
9. "Tuesday" – 3:19
10. "Winter Kills" – 4:03
11. "State Farm" – 3:35
12. "Situation" (US 12" mix) – 5:46
13. "Don't Go" (Todd Terry Freeze mix) – 6:12
14. "Situation" (Club 69 Future Funk mix) – 8:48
15. "Only You" (1999 version) – 2:53

== Weekly charts ==
Chart (1999)	Peak Position
Scottish Albums (OCC)	37
Swedish Albums (Sverigetopplistan)	28
UK Albums (OCC)	22
UK Independent Albums (OCC)	5

== Sales and certifications ==
Region	Certification	Certified units/sales
United Kingdom (BPI)	Silver	60,000^{^}
^{^} Shipments figures based on certification alone.
