= Reconnected Live =

Live album by Yazoo (Yaz)
- Released: 27 September 2010
- Recorded: 2008
- Genre: Synth-pop
- Label: Mute – CDSTUMM322
- Producer: Yazoo

Yazoo (Yaz) chronology
In Your Room (2008)	Reconnected Live (2010)	Essential (2012)

Professional ratings
Review scores
Source	Rating
AllMusic	4/5 stars

Reconnected Live is a live album by UK synth-pop duo Yazoo, also known in North America as Yaz. It was released by Mute Records on 27 September 2010 in the UK and the following day in the United States. It was released in several formats: a standard 2-CD set, a limited edition 2-CD deluxe edition containing a 32-page hardback book, and as a digital download. Reconnected Live was produced by Yazoo, recorded by Martin Hildred and mixed by Vince Clarke and Dave Loudoun.

The iTunes pre-order version features an exclusive track, the previously unreleased "Get Set", which was originally recorded in 1982 and used as the theme to the BBC children's television show Get Set for Summer which was planned to be released as a single in that year.

It is the first release of Yaz released in North America by Mute Records rather than its North American home label Sire Records.

== Background ==
Twenty-five years after Yazoo split, members Vince Clarke and Alison Moyet reunited for a short tour of Europe and North America during 2008. The 'Reconnected Tour' marked the first time that the duo had performed any songs from their second album You and Me Both live, and it was their first full tour of North America. In a 30 May 2008 interview with Side-Line magazine, Clarke first announced that a live CD would be released. Tracks on Reconnected Live were recorded from various dates during the tour. The album's liner notes do not specify from which shows the recordings were taken.

== Track list ==
=== Disc 1 ===
No.	Title	Writer(s)	Length
1.	"Nobody's Diary"	Moyet	4:53
2.	"Bad Connection"	Clarke	4:02
3.	"Mr. Blue"	Clarke	4:03
4.	"Good Times"	Moyet	3:32
5.	"Tuesday"	Clarke	3:04
6.	"Ode to Boy"	Moyet	4:18
7.	"Goodbye 70's"	Moyet	2:53
8.	"Too Pieces"	Clarke	3:35
9.	"In My Room"	Clarke	3:31
10.	"Anyone"	Moyet	3:32
11.	"Walk Away from Love"	Clarke	3:10

=== Disc 2 ===
No.	Title	Writer(s)	Length
1.	"State Farm"	Clarke, Moyet	4:02
2.	"Sweet Thing"	Moyet	3:54
3.	"Winter Kills"	Moyet	4:22
4.	"Midnight"	Moyet	4:34
5.	"Unmarked"	Clarke	3:31
6.	"Bring Your Love Down (Didn't I)"	Moyet	3:34
7.	"Don't Go"	Clarke	5:56
8.	"Only You"	Clarke	3:09
9.	"Situation"	Clarke, Moyet	6:23

== Charts ==
Chart (2010)	Peak position
Swedish Albums Chart	57
U.S. Billboard Top Dance/Electronic Albums	21
