= Four Pieces (album) =

2018 box set by Yazoo

Box set by Yazoo
- Released: 26 October 2018
- Recorded: 1981–1983
- Genre: Synth-pop; new wave
- Label: Mute
- Producer: E.C. Radcliffe; Yazoo

Yazoo chronology
The Collection (2012)	Four Pieces (2018)

Four Pieces is a deluxe vinyl box set by English synth-pop duo Yazoo, released on 26 October 2018 by Mute Records. Set in hardback book format and pressed on heavyweight black 180g vinyl, the collection includes remastered editions of the band's two studio albums along with remixes and BBC sessions, some of which are previously unreleased. Due to popular demand, the box set has also been confirmed for release on CD.

== Track listing ==
=== LP 1: Upstairs at Eric's (Remastered) ===
Side A

1. "Don't Go"
2. "Too Pieces"
3. "Bad Connection"
4. "I Before E Except After C"
5. "Midnight"
6. "In My Room"

Side B

1. "Only You"
2. "Goodbye '70s"
3. "Tuesday"
4. "Winter Kills"
5. "Bring Your Love Down (Didn't I)"

=== LP 2: You and Me Both (Remastered) ===
Side A

1. "Nobody's Diary"
2. "Softly Over"
3. "Sweet Thing"
4. "Mr. Blue"
5. "Good Times"

Side B

1. "Walk Away from Love"
2. "Ode to Boy"
3. "Unmarked"
4. "Anyone"
5. "Happy People"
6. "And On"

=== LP 3: Eight Remixes ===
Side A

1. "Nobody's Diary – Extended Version"
2. "Situation – Richard X Remix"
3. "Don't Go – Remix"
4. "Only You – Orchestral Mix"

Side B

1. "Situation – The Aggressive Attitude Mix"
2. "Don't Go – Tee’s TNT Radio Mix"
3. "State Farm – Madhouse Mix Edit"
4. "Winter Kills – Minute Taker Remix"*

=== LP 4: Two BBC Sessions ===
Side A: John Peel, June 1982

1. "Don't Go"*
2. "Midnight"*
3. "In My Room"*
4. "Winter Kills"*

Side B: David Jensen, September 1982

1. "Bring Your Love Down (Didn't I)"
2. "In My Room"
3. "Situation"*
4. "Too Pieces"*
- Previously unreleased
