= Jordan Suckley =

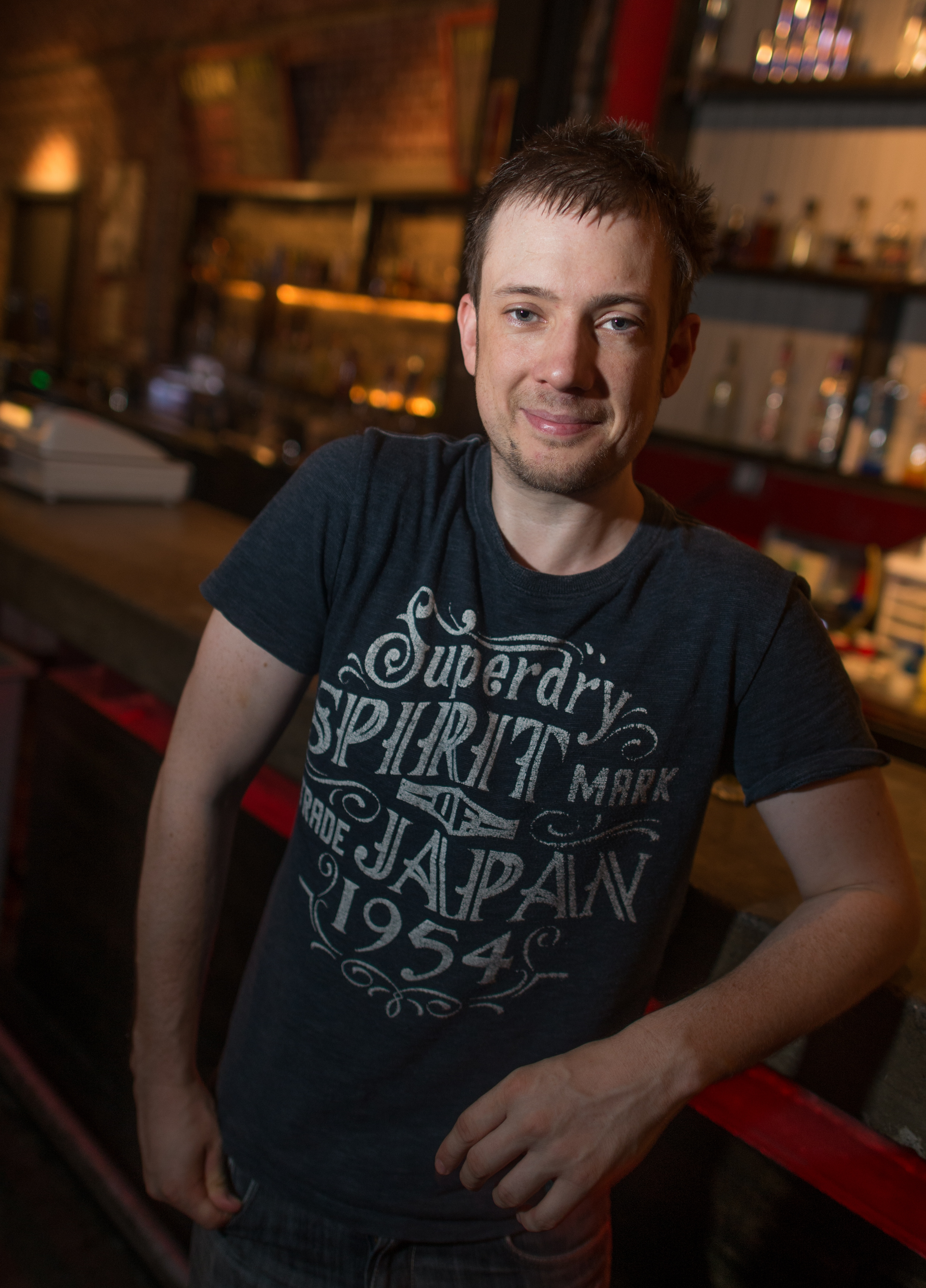
- Jordan Suckley attending an Odin Works event at Nextdoor in Honolulu, Hawaii, 16 August 2014

Background information
- Also known as: Chester Cat
- Born: Jordan Suckley; 22 May 1985 (age 41); Liverpool, England
- Genres: Trance, EDM, techno, tech trance
- Occupations: Music producer, DJ, radio host
- Labels: Armada, Black Hole, Damaged Recordings
- Website: www.jordansuckley.co.uk

Jordan Suckley (born 22 May 1985) is a British radio host, DJ and producer who has composed and remixed notable tracks on albums that have reached No. 1 on the US iTunes Dance Charts. Suckley is most well known for his trance tracks which have garnered acclaim from Armin van Buuren, Aly & Fila and others who have found success in the genre.

== Music career ==
When Suckley was 18, he attended Swansea University for a degree in business. While attending university, he entered and won a DJ competition which the prize was playing at Cream in Liverpool. After his first set, Suckley began DJing a few smaller gigs, until eventually he met a promoter at an Eddie Halliwell event in Bristol. He gave the promoter a demo mix and within a few days, the promoter called and offered to book him for a Gatecrasher tour in Wales for New Year's Eve.

In 2009, he was picked up by Black Hole Recordings and began touring around the United Kingdom; performing at various venues and small shows.

In 2010, while on a flight to play at PlanetLove at Shane's Castle, Northern Ireland, Suckley met Gareth Emery on his flight. They engaged in conversation, during which Gareth Emery asked if Suckley would be interested in remixing a track from one of Emery's most popular albums Northern Lights. On 18 March 2011 the album was released entitled Northern Lights Re-Lit with remixes by acts including himself, Hardwell, Arty, Giuseppe Ottaviani, John O’Callaghan, Lange and Ashley Wallbridge. The album, within hours of release, became No.1 on the US iTunes Dance Chart.

On 28 February 2012, BBC Radio 1 announced that Suckley would be joining a new line up of DJs for the new In New DJs We Trust with B.Traits, Mosca and Julio Bashmore hosting shows on a four weekly rotation. This new schedule took effect on Monday, 2 April 2012.

In April, 2013 Suckley collaborated with Simon Patterson to present their creation 'Vanilla', released on Spinnin's Reset Records. At the album's release, it garnered support from many music industry leaders and was rated in the top 5 of Beatport and Trackitdown charts.

In 2019, Suckley started his new, progressive and tech, side project called Chester Cat.

== Discography ==
=== Albums ===
- 2014 - Goodgreef Future Trance – Black Hole Recordings
- 2016 - Damaged Australia V1 - Damaged Recordings
- 2017 - Damaged Asia V1 - Damaged Recordings
- 2019 - Damaged 100 - Damaged Recordings

=== Singles and contributions ===
- 2008 – Ben Nicky vs Jordan Suckley – Future Creature – Abstract Recordings
- 2008 – Savage – Abstract Recordings
- 2008 – Trusty Rusty – Infexious Recordings
- 2008 – Mac and Taylor and Jordan Suckley – Animal – Infexious Recordings
- 2009 – Flames! – Goodgreef Digital
- 2009 – From Paradise! – Goodgreef Digital
- 2009 – The Storm! – Goodgreef Digital, Global Sounds
- 2010 – We Are 10 – Goodgreef Digital
- 2010 – Tarzan – Reset Records
- 2010 – Lush! – Reset Records
- 2010 – The Hooded Claw – Reset Records
- 2010 – Patience/Chariot of the Gods – Liquid Recordings
- 2010 – Out Cold – Goodgreef Digital
- 2011 – The Slug – Goodgreef Digital
- 2011 – Jordan Suckley featuring Lisa Cowell – Latvian Sun – Reset Records
- 2011 – 23! – Reset Records
- 2011 – Jordan Suckley featuring Nasa – Rokit – Reset Records
- 2011 – Amar La Vida – Reset Records
- 2012 – Spooked – Liquid Recordings
- 2012 – Sunkissed – Liquid Recordings
- 2012 – Prisoner – Discover
- 2012 – Jordan Suckley featuring Leanne Thomas – Thunder – Night Vision
- 2013 – Simon Patterson and Jordan Suckley – Vanilla – Reset Recordings
- 2013 – Do or Die – Perfecto Fluoro
- 2013 – Santa Cruz – Liquid Recordings
- 2013 – Adam Ellis and Jordan Suckley – Mandarine / Take No Prisoners – Subculture
- 2014 – Jordan Suckley and Eddie Bitar – Centipede – Damaged Records
- 2014 – Jordan Suckley and Paul Webster – Help! – Damaged Records
- 2014 – Contaminated – Damaged Records – Black Hole Recordings
- 2014 – Access – Vandit Records
- 2014 – Elation – Damaged Records – Black Hole Recordings
- 2015 – Medic – Damaged Records – BLack Hole Recordings
- 2015 – Droid – Damaged Records – Black Hole Recordings
- 2015 – Who Cares – Damaged Records – Black Hole Recordings
- 2016 – Tiësto – Suburban Train (Jordan Suckley Remix) – Black Hole Recordings
- 2016 – Jordan Suckley and Sam Jones – Hijacker – Black Hole Recordings
- 2016 – Liquid Soul and Zyce featuring Solar Kid – Anjuna (Jordan Suckley Remix) – Black Hole Recordings
- 2016 – Jordan Suckley – Ritual – Damaged Records – Black Hole Recordings
- 2016 – Jordan Suckley and Sam Jones – Wilma – Damadeg Records – Black Hole Recordings
- 2017 – Jordan Suckley – Suspect 1 – Damaged Records – Black Hole Recordings
- 2017 – Jordan Suckley and Kutski – Survelliance – Damaged Records – Black Hole Recordings
- 2018 – Jordan Suckley and Ferry Corsten – Rosetta – Flashover Recordings
- 2018 – Jordan Suckley – C.Y.M. – A State of Trance
- 2018 – Jordan Suckley – Rocket Punch – Damaged Records – Black Hole Recordings
- 2018 – Jordan Suckley and Paul van Dyk – Accelerator – Vandvit
- 2019 – Jordan Suckely – Moskva – Damaged Records – Black Hole Recordings
- 2019 – Major League – Wonder? (Jordan Suckley Remix) – Damaged Records – Black Hole Recordings
- 2019 – Markus Schulz Pres. Dakota – The Spirit of the Warrior (Jordan Suckley Remix) – Coldharbour Recordings
- 2020 - Jordan Suckley & Sam Jones - Space Jam - Damaged
- 2020 - Jordan Suckley - Another Dimension - Vandit
- 2020 - Jordan Suckley - Hold Me - Pure Trance Neon
- 2020 - Jordan Suckley & onTune - Tranceformations Anthem 2020 - Damaged
- 2021 - Jordan Suckley - Just A Dream - Vandit
- 2021 - Jordan Suckley & Clara Yates - Let Me Be Your Fantasy - Damaged
- 2021 - Jordan Suckley - Retro Tech - Damaged
- 2022 - Jordan Suckley - Cruise Control/ Break The Spell - Damaged
- 2022 - Jordan Suckley - Palermo / Summer Kicks - Damaged
- 2022 - Jordan Suckley - Tribal Sense - Vandit
- 2022 - Waves_On_Waves & Jordan Suckley - Sandcastle - Severe Records
