= The Sapphires (American band) =

American pop ensemble

- Origin: Philadelphia, Pennsylvania
- Genres: pop ensemble
- Label: Swan Records
- Members: Vocals –; Carol Jackson; George Garner; Joe Livingston *Band members; Leon Huff; Thom Bell; Bobby Eli; Bobby Martin; Joe Macho *Backing Vocals – Ashford and Simpson, Melba Moore

The Sapphires were an American pop ensemble from Philadelphia, Pennsylvania. Their sound was comparable to much of the music released on Motown in the mid-1960s. The vocalists were Carol Jackson, George Garner, and Joe Livingston.

== Music ==
The group first began performing together in the early 1960s, and signed to Swan Records at the behest of producer Jerry Ross. Their first single was "Where Is Johnny Now" b/w "Your True Love", featuring Leon Huff and Thom Bell on keyboards, Bobby Eli on guitar, Bobby Martin on vibraphones, and Joe Macho on bass.

The record did not chart, and for their second single, "Who Do You Love", Ross had Kenny Gamble arrange the vocals. Joe Renzetti was the guitarist. This single hit #25 on the US Billboard Hot 100 in 1964. The follow-up single was "I Found Out Too Late", which failed to chart; despite the flagging sales, the group released a full LP that year, again with Gamble arranging vocals. A third and final single for Swan, "Gotta Be More than Friends", was released in 1964, and the group moved to ABC-Paramount late in 1964.

The first two ABC singles were "Let's Break Up for a While" and "Thank You for Loving Me", but the group did not return to the charts until 1965's "Gotta Have Your Love", peaking at #33 on the R&B Singles chart and #77 on the Hot 100. The single's backing vocalists were Valerie Simpson, Nick Ashford, and Melba Moore.

Three further singles followed for ABC – "Evil One", "Gonna Be a Big Thing", and "Slow Fizz" – but none of them sold well, and the group split up around late 1966.

== UK popularity ==
The Sapphires, and especially the songs "Slow Fizz", "Gotta Have Your Love" (which reached number 33 on the R&B charts), "Evil One", and "Gonna Be a Big Thing", became popular on the UK's Northern soul scene, including during the early days at the Twisted Wheel Club in Manchester, UK.

In 1983, the group sang the back-up vocals on the Yazoo song "Walk Away from Love" on the album, "You and Me Both".

== Members ==
- Carol Jackson (aka Carol Canty), d. November 1, 2010
- George Garner
- Joe Livingston
