= List of Billboard number-one dance/disco singles of 1982 =

The Dance/Disco Top 80 was a chart published weekly by Billboard magazine in the United States, which ranked the popularity of dance singles in nightclubs across the country, based on a national survey of club disc jockeys. The word "dance" was added to the chart's name on March 27, 1982.

== Chart history ==
Issue date	Song	Artist
January 2	"You Can"/ "Fire in My Heart"	Madleen Kane
January 9	"You Can"/ "Fire in My Heart"	Madleen Kane
January 16	"Wordy Rappinghood"/ "Genius of Love"	Tom Tom Club
January 23	"I Can't Go for That (No Can Do)"	Daryl Hall and John Oates
January 30	"You're the One for Me"	D. Train
February 6	"You're the One for Me"	D. Train
February 13	"You're the One for Me"	D. Train
February 20	"Glad to Know You"/ "3,000,000 Synths"/ "Ai No Corrida"	Chas Jankel
February 27	"Glad to Know You"/ "3,000,000 Synths"/ "Ai No Corrida"	Chas Jankel
March 6	"Glad to Know You"/ "3,000,000 Synths"/ "Ai No Corrida"	Chas Jankel
March 13	"Glad to Know You"/ "3,000,000 Synths"/ "Ai No Corrida"	Chas Jankel
March 20	"Glad to Know You"/ "3,000,000 Synths"/ "Ai No Corrida"	Chas Jankel
March 27	"Glad to Know You"/ "3,000,000 Synths"/ "Ai No Corrida"	Chas Jankel
April 3	"Glad to Know You"/ "3,000,000 Synths"/ "Ai No Corrida"	Chas Jankel
April 10	"Don't Come Crying to Me"/ "Let It Ride"	Linda Clifford
April 17	"Don't Come Crying to Me"/ "Let It Ride"	Linda Clifford
April 24	"Don't Come Crying to Me"/ "Let It Ride"	Linda Clifford
May 1	"Murphy's Law"	Chéri
May 8	"Murphy's Law"	Chéri
May 15	"Murphy's Law"	Chéri
May 22	"In the Name of Love"	Thompson Twins
May 29	"In the Name of Love"	Thompson Twins
June 5	"In the Name of Love"	Thompson Twins
June 12	"In the Name of Love"	Thompson Twins
June 19	"In the Name of Love"	Thompson Twins
June 26	"Thanks to You"	Sinnamon
July 3	"Thanks to You"	Sinnamon
July 10	"Do I Do"	Stevie Wonder
July 17	"Do I Do"	Stevie Wonder
July 24	"Do I Do"	Stevie Wonder
July 31	"Right on Target"	Paul Parker
August 7	"Right on Target"	Paul Parker
August 14	"So Fine"	Howard Johnson
August 21	"Situation"	Yaz
August 28	"Situation"	Yaz
September 4	"Situation"	Yaz
September 11	"Situation"	Yaz
September 18	"Walking on Sunshine"	Rockers Revenge featuring Donnie Calvin
September 25	"Love Come Down"	Evelyn King
October 2	"Love Come Down"	Evelyn King
October 9	"Love Come Down"	Evelyn King
October 16	Redd Hott (all cuts)	Sharon Redd
October 23	"Don't Go"	Yaz
October 30	"Don't Go"	Yaz
November 6	"Nasty Girl"	Vanity 6
November 13	"Nasty Girl"	Vanity 6
November 20	"Nasty Girl"	Vanity 6
November 27	"Nasty Girl"	Vanity 6
December 4	"1999"	Prince
December 11	"1999"	Prince
December 18	"The Look of Love"	ABC
December 25	"It's Raining Men"	The Weather Girls

== See also ==
- 1982 in music
- List of Billboard Hot 100 number ones of 1982
