= Reset Records =

Reset Records was a British record company founded in 1983 by Vince Clarke (Depeche Mode, Yazoo, the Assembly, Erasure) and Eric Radcliffe.

The four singles by Robert Marlow were released on this label. Peter Hewson, Absolute and Hardware also released some singles on the label.

== History ==
=== Beginnings ===
Some time after Vince Clarke left Depeche Mode, in 1982 while working with Yazoo, his friend Robert Marlow approached him. Marlow tried to convince Clarke to give him some time in the studio, which he first refused due to high costs it required. However, after the insistence of Marlow, he offered him one day to work at Blackwing Studios, along with Eric Radcliffe, which eventually turned into weeks. This led to work on several tracks Marlow had written on his own and during his time in Film Noir, and in those sessions "The Face of Dorian Gray" was demoed.

=== Early years and deal with RCA ===
After the recording of "The Face of Dorian Gray", Clarke decided to give it a proper release, getting attention from RCA.

"The Face of Dorian Gray" was released on 11 July 1983, peaking at number 93 on the UK Singles Chart.

=== Absolute ===
Sometime in late 1984, Absolute—a young group from London formed by Colin "Taf" Taaffe on vocals, Paul Johnson and John Thomas on synth—contacted Radcliffe.
