= René Klijn =

Dutch singer and model

- Born: 8 September 1962; The Hague, Netherlands
- Died: 5 September 1993 (aged 30); The Hague, Netherlands
- Cause of death: Complications of AIDS
- Occupation(s): Singer, model
- Years active: 1987–1993
- Known for: Appearing in a controversial, but critically praised episode of Paul de Leeuw's De Schreeuw van de Leeuw, which led to the hit single "Mr. Blue".

René Klijn (The Hague, 8 September 1962 – The Hague 5 September 1993) was a Dutch singer and model. He became famous in 1992 for discussing the fact that he was an HIV/AIDS patient in a controversial, but critically awarded episode of Paul de Leeuw's talk show De Schreeuw van De Leeuw. In his final life year he scored a number one hit with the song "Mr. Blue".

== Biography ==
He was a member of the boyband Bam-to-Bam-Bam. In the early 1990s he was diagnosed with AIDS, which he revealed to viewers in an episode of De Schreeuw van de Leeuw starring host Paul de Leeuw, broadcast on 28 November 1992. The episode was controversial because De Leeuw took the liberty to crack jokes about Klijn's illness, but at the same time it took away a lot of taboos and tension. Klijn was in charge of how the episode was supposed to look and invited friends and family members to come and speak, but also his medics. At the end of the episode they sang a duet, "Mr. Blue", a cover of the band Yazoo, which was also released as a single. It became a number one-hit in the Netherlands and the money was donated to the AIDS foundation. The episode itself won a Bronze Rose d'Or in Montreux.

He died on 5 September 1993 in The Hague from his disease. His partner Maarten took his ashes with him on a trip to the United States, where he scattered the ashes from a boat, de Leeuw was attending this moment, which was filmed on camera.
