= The Other Side of Love =

1982 single by Yazoo

Single by Yazoo
- B-side: "Ode to Boy"
- Released: 8 November 1982; 7 October 1996 (CD reissue)
- Recorded: 1982
- Genre: Synth-pop
- Length: 3:05
- Label: Mute
- Songwriters: Vince Clarke; Alison Moyet
- Producers: Eric Radcliffe; Yazoo

Yazoo singles chronology
"Situation" (1982)	"The Other Side of Love" (1982)	"Nobody's Diary" (1983)

"The Other Side of Love" is a song by the British synth-pop band Yazoo, released on 8 November 1982 as their fourth single. The single peaked at #13 on the UK Singles Chart, making it the band's least successful single and the only one of their four singles to miss the top three in the UK. The track was written by band members Vince Clarke and Alison Moyet, and was originally a non-album single (it was later added to a reissue of Upstairs at Eric's).

Prior to their November 1982 UK tour, Yazoo returned to the studio in October 1982 to record a new single. They decided to write a new song together rather than lift another track from Upstairs at Eric's. Clarke told the NME in September 1982, "We haven't actually written anything yet, but it's definitely going to be a new song. I think it's better to come up with something new rather than take another track off the album."

It featured Stiff Records' all-female band Sylvia and the Sapphires on backing vocals following a chance meeting on the B.A. Robertson show.

The track was not included in the set-list for the duo's 2008 reunion tour. In an interview on the official Yazoo website Moyet explained: "We left out stuff that translated less well to live work. Personally I always thought "The Other Side of Love" was a bit wank. It is my least favourite track. I didn't like singing it and Vince was not bothered by it so we left it out."

The single's B-side is "Ode to Boy", which appeared on their second album You and Me Both. The cover's sleeve design was created by Moyet.

== Reception ==
Neil Tennant, writing for Smash Hits, described "The Other Side of Love" as a "light pop offering" and felt it was "more closely related" to "Just Can't Get Enough" than "Don't Go". John Shearlaw of Record Mirror considered it to be a "subtle grower and wonderfully skilful dive back into a smoky, twilit nightclub world". Charles Shaar Murray of NME called it a "fast, sexy dance tune that gives Moyet a chance to show off her soul chops". He noted that she "naturally does [this] to exceptionally good effect", but was critical of Clarke's backing track for "let[ting] the project down to a certain extent". He believed that it sounds "too fast, too tinny and too lightweight, and the end result is music of insufficient power to support the amount of energy being pumped in Alfwise". Tony Mitchell of Sounds noted that the song was "bouncy" and "catchy", but also "deeply unsatisfying" as Moyet "overlay[s] her strong, stylish vocals on the sort of sound you can get out of a plastic music box". He added that Clarke had "come up with a rehash of an early Depeche Mode B-side, with all its lightweight, bubblegum implications".

== Track listings ==
7" UK single (Mute YAZ 002)

1. "The Other Side of Love" – 3:05
2. "Ode to Boy" – 3:37

12" UK single (Mute 12YAZ 002)

1. "The Other Side of Love" (Remixed Extended Version) – 5:24
2. "Ode to Boy" – 3:37

CD (Mute CDYAZ2)

1. "The Other Side of Love" – 3:05
2. "Ode to Boy" – 3:37
3. "The Other Side of Love (Remixed Extended Version) – 5:24

== Charts ==
Chart (1982–1983)	Peak position
Australia (Kent Music Report)	86
Austria (Hitradio Ö3)	20
Belgium (Ultratop 50 Flanders)	9
Denmark (Hitlisten)	7
Ireland (IRMA)	11
Italy (TV Sorrisi e Canzoni)	20
Netherlands (Single Top 100)	30
Portugal (AFP)	18
Switzerland (Sonntagsblick Hitparade)	24
UK Singles (Official Charts)	13
West Germany (GfK)	35
Zimbabwe (ZIMA)	15
