= Ode to Boy =

1982 song by Yazoo

Song by Yazoo

from the album You and Me Both
- Released: 1982
- Genre: Synth-pop
- Length: 3:36
- Label: Mute
- Songwriter: Alison Moyet
- Producers: Yazoo; Eric Radcliffe

"Ode to Boy" is a song by English synth-pop duo Yazoo. Originally the B-side to their 1982 hit "The Other Side of Love", it was later included on their second and final studio album You and Me Both in 1983. Whereas Yazoo's version is a sparse atmospheric track with synths and percussion, vocalist Alison Moyet later recorded her own version of the song in an uptempo indie-rock style for her 1994 album Essex.

== Yazoo version ==
"Ode to Boy" was originally recorded in 1982 and appeared as the B-side to Yazoo's 1982 non-album single "The Other Side of Love". It then appeared as an album track on the duo's You and Me Both album. The song was produced by Yazoo and Eric Radcliffe. Speaking of the song to Record Mirror in 1983, Moyet revealed: "[it] started being of someone I knew, but ended up being more of a poetic exercise". Moyet later revealed the song was about her bandmate Vince Clarke. Later recalling the song's writing and development in 2016, she said: "It was written, as all my guitar songs are written, fast. It was made slower for Yazoo."

=== Critical reception ===
Neil Tennant of Smash Hits described the song as being the "darker side of Yazoo" and featuring "one of [Moyet's] smokiest vocals". In a 2008 issue of The Advocate, the song was described as "smoldering". William Ruhlmann of AllMusic highlighted "Ode to Boy" as a standout track from You and Me Both by labeling it an AMG Pick Track. In a review of the album by music website Sputnikmusic, the song was described as "one of the high points on the record – dares to slow things down with a sluggish, dingy melody and disjointed, echoed vocals from Moyet".

=== Personnel ===
- Alison Moyet – vocals, producer
- Vince Clarke – instrumentation, producer
- Eric Radcliffe – producer

== Alison Moyet version ==
"Ode to Boy"

Single by Alison Moyet

from the album Essex
- Released: 10 October 1994
- Length: 2:55
- Label: Columbia
- Songwriter: Alison Moyet
- Producer: Pete Glenister

Alison Moyet singles chronology
"Getting into Something" (1994)	"Ode to Boy" (1994)	"The First Time Ever I Saw Your Face" (1995)

"Ode to Boy" was later recorded for Moyet's fourth studio album Essex, released in 1994. In October 1994, "Ode to Boy" was released as the album's fourth and final single.

=== Background ===
For its inclusion on Essex, Moyet recorded "Ode to Boy" in its original form; a guitar-dominant version. The song was produced by Pete Glenister. Speaking of the song's re-recording for Essex in contrast to the slower Yazoo version, Moyet revealed: "It was sped back up for Essex. They are two completely different songs."

Columbia rejected the original recording of Essex and insisted that it be re-recorded to create a more commercial package. A mix of the song, titled "Ode to Boy II", featured additional production and mixing done by Adrian Bushby and Pete Davis. This version was included on Essex as a bonus track. When "Ode to Boy" was released as a single, this remix was selected and the "II" was dropped from its title. For the single, Columbia also hired Junior Vasquez to give the song a dance remix treatment. He produced two mixes: the "Factory Mix" and the "NY-LA Mix".

The song peaked at No. 59 in the UK and remained in the Top 100 for two weeks. "Ode to Boy" was released on 12", cassette and CD in the UK and on CD across Europe. A music video was filmed to promote the single, which was directed by The Douglas Brothers.

In 2016, a deluxe edition of Essex was released by BMG; however, due to limited space across the two discs, none of the remixes of "Ode to Boy" were included.

=== Critical reception ===
Upon its release as a single, Alan Jones from Music Week gave it three out of five, commenting that "an aggressively strummed acoustic guitar gives way to Moyet's strident vocals on an intense work which allows her to show the searing side of her voice more than of late". Patrick Brennan of Hot Press stated, "In her days before Vince Clarke got his technological hands on her, Alison Moyet was quite a raucous rhythm and blues singer. It's that throaty tradition she draws on here to churn out an uninhibited diatribe of womanly desire and admiration for a veritable hunk on wheels. Fast, acoustic and frenetic 'Ode To Boy' lacks the soul of previously more restrained outings in spite of its energy and lust." Lennox Herald felt it was "nearly there as far as a good song goes" and added, "Moyet has a wonderful voice which is not always shown off to great effect but this still lacks that little something for truly massive success."

In a review of Essex, William Ruhlmann of AllMusic commented that the re-recording was "an unnecessary remake" which had been "arranged to sound like 'Pinball Wizard'." Louder Than War writer Paul Scott-Bates described the original Yazoo version as "incredible" and noted that on Moyet's version "guitar and manic production accompany [her] vocals and easily becomes the icing on the cake on Essex". Penny Black Music writer Adrian Janes commented that "Ode to Boy" "eagerly delights in the female gaze".

=== Track listings ===
- 12-inch single
1. "Ode to Boy" – 2:55
2. "Ode to Boy" (N.Y.- L.A. mix) – 3:27
3. "Ode to Boy" (Factory mix) – 9:56
4. "Ode to Boy" (N.Y.- L.A. dub) – 3:12
5. "Ode to Boy" (Factory dub 2) – 4:40
- Cassette single
1. "Ode to Boy" – 2:55
2. "Life in a Hole" – 3:45
- CD single
1. "Ode to Boy" – 2:55
2. "Life in a Hole" – 3:45
3. "Sunderland Glynn" – 2:50
4. "Ode to Boy" (Factory mix) – 9:53

=== Personnel ===
==== Musicians ====
- Alison Moyet – lead vocals, tambourine on "Ode to Boy", harmonica on "Sunderland Glynn"
- Christian Mars – guitar on "Ode to Boy"
- Pete Glenister – guitar on "Ode to Boy", "Life in a Hole" and "Sunderland Glynn"
- Andy Coughlan – bass on "Ode to Boy"
- David Ballard – bongos on "Ode to Boy"
- Tony Riley – drums on "Ode to Boy"
- Steve Cradock – guitar on "Life in a Hole"
- Dave Ruffey – drums on "Life in a Hole" and "Sunderland Glynn"
- John Mackenzie – bass on "Life in a Hole" and "Sunderland Glynn"

==== Production ====
- Pete Glenister – producer of "Ode to Boy", "Life in a Hole" and "Sunderland Glynn", mixing on "Life in a Hole"
- Neil Brockbank, Vic Van Vugt – engineers on "Ode to Boy"
- Alan Winstanley – mixing on "Ode to Boy" and "Sunderland Glynn"
- Pete Davis, Adrian Bushby – additional production and mix on "Ode to Boy"
- Junior Vasquez – additional production and mix on "Factory Mix" and "N.Y.-L.A. Mix"
- Alison Moyet, Vic Van Vugt – mixing on "Life in a Hole"

==== Other ====
- Alison Moyet, Martin Jenkins – design
- Robert Clifford – photography

=== Charts ===
Chart (1994)	Peak position
UK Singles (OCC)	59
UK Club Chart (Music Week)	80
