= Nobody's Diary =

1983 single by Yazoo

Single by Yazoo

from the album You and Me Both
- B-side: "State Farm"
- Released: 9 May 1983
- Recorded: 1983
- Genre: Synth-pop
- Length: 4:31
- Label: Mute; Sire
- Songwriter: Alison Moyet
- Producers: Daniel Miller; Eric Radcliffe; Yazoo

Yazoo singles chronology
"The Other Side of Love" (1982)	"Nobody's Diary" (1983)	"Situation 1990" (1990)

Alternative cover
- limited edition 12" vinyl cover (L12 YAZ 003)

"Nobody's Diary" is a song recorded by British synth-pop band Yazoo. It was released in May 1983 as the only single from their second and last album, You and Me Both (1983). The song was written by Alison Moyet and produced by Yazoo, Eric Radcliffe and Daniel Miller. "Nobody's Diary" peaked at number three in the UK Singles Chart.

== Background ==
Moyet wrote "Nobody's Diary" around the age of 16, at a time when she was playing in bands in the South East Essex area. It was one of the last songs to be recorded for You and Me Both. Vince Clarke recalled in 2008: "It immediately stood out to be the track that should be released as a single."

== Production ==
"Nobody's Diary" was recorded at Radcliffe's Blackwing Studios and mastered at Townhouse Studios. The song has a tempo of 129 beats per minute.

== Release ==
The single's cover—designed by Steven Appleby with the sleeve produced by Acrobat Design—depicts a "rather hip young man in a bathtub [who] seems to have forgotten to turn off the water, so intent is he on his private thoughts".

Mute Records released an additional second and limited edition 12-inch single of the song in the UK with "Situation" on the flip side. "Situation" appears on the U.S. version of the band's previous album Upstairs at Eric's (although it was added to the UK track list in later pressings).

Sire Records released "Nobody's Diary" in the United States with You and Me Both album track "State Farm" as a double A-side. "State Farm" was not included on the UK version of You and Me Both. The double A-side hit number one on the US Dance/Disco Top 80 chart in July 1983.

== Reception ==
Upon its release, Simon Tebbutt of Record Mirror described "Nobody's Diary" as "more restrained" than some of Yazoo's previous work, but also "a sneaker and grabber that goes for the jugular". Carole Linfield of Sounds praised it as a "Yazoo single that hits the heart in all the right places", although she noted it's "not quite the top three material their previous singles boasted". She added that it's a "cleverly infectious, happy song which Alf manages to inject passion and heartbreak into, by virtue of the 'love's labour's lost' lyrics". Neil Tennant, writing for Smash Hits, commented: "Strong on emotion and weak on melody but the combination of ringing synths and bluesy singing is still a winner." Debbi Voller of Number One wrote: "It sounds like all the rest, and yet, it doesn't! Somehow they keep coming up with enough hit variations on their theme. Can't fail." David Jensen, writing for Melody Maker, noted how he "quite like[s]" the song, but felt he would "like to hear a different kind of backing track" for Moyet's "wonderful" vocals as he felt Yazoo's "synthesized sound doesn't have very much depth". He still believed it would be a big hit and added that Moyet "sounds very different on this, a bit restrained, a bit deeper".

In 1985, the 12" single version was described by The Absolute Sound as "[typifying] all the neat features of 12 inch 45 rpm. The sound is glorious. [The song] is quite wonderful. The musical textures are fascinating. The sound is open, and the soundstage is huge. The bass is tight." In CMJ's 1999 New Music Report (coinciding with the release of the group's greatest hits compilation), "Nobody's Diary" was described as "[a] poignant offering, rife with emotional fervor that remains fresh and undated despite the limiting musical technology of the time."

== Promotion ==
A music video was filmed to promote the single, directed by Chris Gabrin. Yazoo also performed the song twice on Top of the Pops.

== Track listing ==
- UK 7-inch vinyl (Mute YAZ 003)
1. "Nobody's Diary" – 3:58
2. "State Farm" – 3:34
- UK 12-inch vinyl (Mute 12 YAZ 003)
1. "Nobody's Diary" – 6:07
2. "State Farm" – 6:37
- UK 12-inch vinyl limited edition (Mute L12 YAZ 003)
1. "Nobody's Diary" – 4:30
2. "Situation" (re-recorded remix) – 7:30
- US 12-inch vinyl (Sire 0-20121)
1. "Nobody's Diary" – 6:07
2. "State Farm" – 6:37

== Charts ==
Chart (1983)	Peak position
Australia (Kent Music Report)	17
Belgium (Ultratop 50 Flanders)	20
Denmark (Hitlisten)	12
Finland (Suomen virallinen lista)	15
France (IFOP)	65
Iceland (Dagblaðið Vísir)	3
Ireland (IRMA)	5
Italy (Musica e dischi)	14
New Zealand (Recorded Music NZ)	14
South African Singles Chart	6
Spain (AFYVE)	10
Sweden (Sverigetopplistan)	9
UK Singles (Official Charts)	3
US Dance Club Songs (Billboard)	1
West Germany (GfK)	18
Zimbabwe (ZIMA)	6

== Certifications ==
Region	Certification	Certified units/sales
United Kingdom (BPI)	Silver	250,000^{^}
^{^} Shipments figures based on certification alone.

== Nobody's Diary EP ==
Nobody's Diary

EP by Yazoo
- Released: 12 May 2008
- Recorded: 1983
- Genre: Synth-pop
- Label: Mute
- Producers: Eric Radcliffe; Yazoo

"Nobody's Diary" was remastered as part of the 2008 In Your Room Yazoo box set and released as a separate EP to promote it. The 2008 release featured a slew of new remixes, including one by Vince Clarke's current Erasure partner Andy Bell.

"Nobody's Diary" was reissued by Mute Records in the UK on 12 May 2008. It is available in 12" vinyl and digital download formats. An exclusive remix of the song is available online directly through Mute's online shop.

=== Track listing ===
- UK 12-inch vinyl EP (Mute 12YAZ7)
1. "Nobody's Diary" (Andy Bell & JC remix)
2. "Nobody's Diary" (original remaster)
3. "Nobody's Diary" (Koishii & Hush remix)
- UK digital download
1. "Nobody's Diary" (original remaster)
2. "Nobody's Diary" (Andy Bell & JC remix)
3. "Nobody's Diary" (Koishii & Hush remix)
4. "Nobody's Diary" (GRN's 12" remix)
5. "Nobody's Diary" (Soil in the Synth remix)

=== Charts ===
Chart (2008)	Peak position
UK Singles (OCC)	100
