= Robert Marlow =

English singer and musician (1961–2022)

- Born: Robert Allen; 21 October 1961
- Origin: Basildon, England
- Died: 22 September 2022 (aged 60)
- Genres: Synth-pop; new wave; electronic
- Occupations: Singer; songwriter; musician; music programmer
- Instruments: Vocals; keyboards; synthesizer; guitar
- Years active: 1978–1985; 1999–2022
- Labels: Reset; RCA; Energy; Electro-Shock
- Formerly of: The Vandals; Film Noir; Marlow

Robert Marlow (born Robert Allen, 21 October 1961 – 22 September 2022) was an English synth-pop singer, songwriter and musician.

== Biography ==
Robert Marlow grew up in Basildon with future Depeche Mode members Vince Clarke, Martin Gore and Andy Fletcher (who died the same year as Marlow, and at the same age). He was also tied to Alison Moyet, with whom he had played in a band, the Vandals. Marlow knew Fletcher and Clarke from the Basildon chapter of the Boys' Brigade. He and Clarke would occasionally get together to play music; Clarke on guitar, and Marlow on the church's piano. Like Clarke, he played in many local bands, and ended up playing in a band, with Clarke, called the Plan, and later French Look, with Gore and Paul Redmond.

Marlow recalled how he and his friends came to be inspired by Britain's emerging synth-pop movement: "There were all these strange new sounds that you'd never heard before, but used with a pop sensibility. When we started listening to Fad Gadget, OMD and John Foxx, it was brilliant, ground-breaking and really exciting. They were almost writing the soundtrack to our lives in a new town."

After the release of "Calling All Destroyers", Marlow shifted between acting and bands.

== Career ==
=== "The Face of Dorian Gray" (1981–1985) ===
Marlow recorded the studio album The Peter Pan Effect with his best friend Vince Clarke during 1982–1984. The project came around when Marlow was in a band called Film Noir, with future keyboardist and guitarist for the Cure, Perry Bamonte. The band supported Depeche Mode on one tour date in Basildon.

Sometime after Clarke left Depeche Mode, Marlow approached Clarke and persuaded him into some studio time at Blackwing Studios with him and Eric Radcliffe. He was offered one day, and decided to record "The Face of Dorian Gray", which then led to more studio time. Clarke suggested that he try to get record company interest. He ended up getting interest from RCA Records, but it was later decided to release the single on Clarke's own label, Reset Records. The single, however, did not get much radio airplay, peaking at number 93 on the UK Singles Chart. Marlow released three more singles—"I Just Want to Dance", "Claudette" and "Calling All Destroyers". The singles suffered the same fate as "The Face of Dorian Gray", and the album was later shelved due to the lack of chart success.

=== The Peter Pan Effect and Marlow (1999–2012) ===
The Peter Pan Effect was released in 1999 by Swedish label Energy Rekords, when Sonet manager, Rod Buckle, showed a demo tape to Energy Rekords. Radcliffe then went up into the bell tower of Blackwing Studios, formerly a church, and found the tapes. He then sent a CD to Energy Rekords, where it was remastered at Polar Studios. In the US, it was released as Erasure's Vince Clarke along with a copy of a Family Fantastic album.

Along with Gary Durant, Marlow formed the duo, Marlow. Durant, who played keyboards and provided backing vocals, had been a friend of Marlow for some time. In early 2006, the Energy Rekords guestbook announced a new album in the works. The duo has been active in live performances, including a Depeche Mode aftershow in February 2006, and various gigs around Europe, particularly in London and Sweden. Their only studio album, Inside/Outside, with the title track arranged and produced by Vince Clarke, who had also remixed a track on the album called "Home", was released on 29 January 2009.

At the end of 2011, Marlow had a second album, The Future, ready to be released. In April 2012, the duo's label placed an announcement that Marlow had decided to quit as a duo. Marlow and Durant broke up the duo in good terms.

=== The Blackwing Sessions and The Future (2012–2022) ===
After the split of the duo in spring 2012, Marlow once again performed as a solo artist. A new 7-track EP, The Blackwing Sessions, which contained demos and alternate versions of tracks from the 1982–1984 recording sessions, was released in a pre-sale session on 8 August 2012 by German label Electro-Shock-Records exclusively via the mailorder-shop POPoNAUT. The official release date of the limited edition (300 copies only) was 19 September 2012.

Marlow's second solo studio album, The Future, was released on 28 June 2013. It was followed by an accompanying remix album, The Future Remixes, on 20 September 2013.

== Death ==
Marlow died after a short and unexpected illness on 22 September 2022, at the age of 60.

== Discography ==
=== Studio albums ===
| Title | Details |
|---|---|
| The Peter Pan Effect | Release date: 18 August 1999; Label: Energy; Formats: CD |
| The Future | Release date: 28 June 2013; Label: Electro-Shock; Formats: CD |

=== Remix albums ===
| Title | Details |
|---|---|
| The Future Remixes | Release date: 20 September 2013; Label: Electro-Shock; Formats: CD |

=== Extended plays ===
| Title | Details |
|---|---|
| The Blackwing Sessions | Release date: 9 September 2012; Label: Electro-Shock; Formats: CD, digital download |

=== Singles ===
| Title | Year | Peak chart positions | Album |
| Title | Year | UK | Album |
|---|---|---|---|
| "The Face of Dorian Gray" | 1983 | 93 | The Peter Pan Effect |
| "I Just Want to Dance" | 1983 | — | The Peter Pan Effect |
| "Claudette" | 1984 | — | The Peter Pan Effect |
| "Calling All Destroyers" | 1985 | — | The Peter Pan Effect |
"—" denotes a recording that did not chart or was not released in that territory.

=== with Marlow ===
==== Studio albums ====
| Title | Details |
|---|---|
| Inside/Outside | Release date: 29 January 2009; Label: Electro-Shock, Purple Nastee; Formats: CD |

==== Extended plays ====
| Title | Details |
|---|---|
| My Teenage Dream | Release date: 2002; Label: Purple Nastee; Formats: CD |
