= Cor Bakker =

Dutch pianist (born 1961)

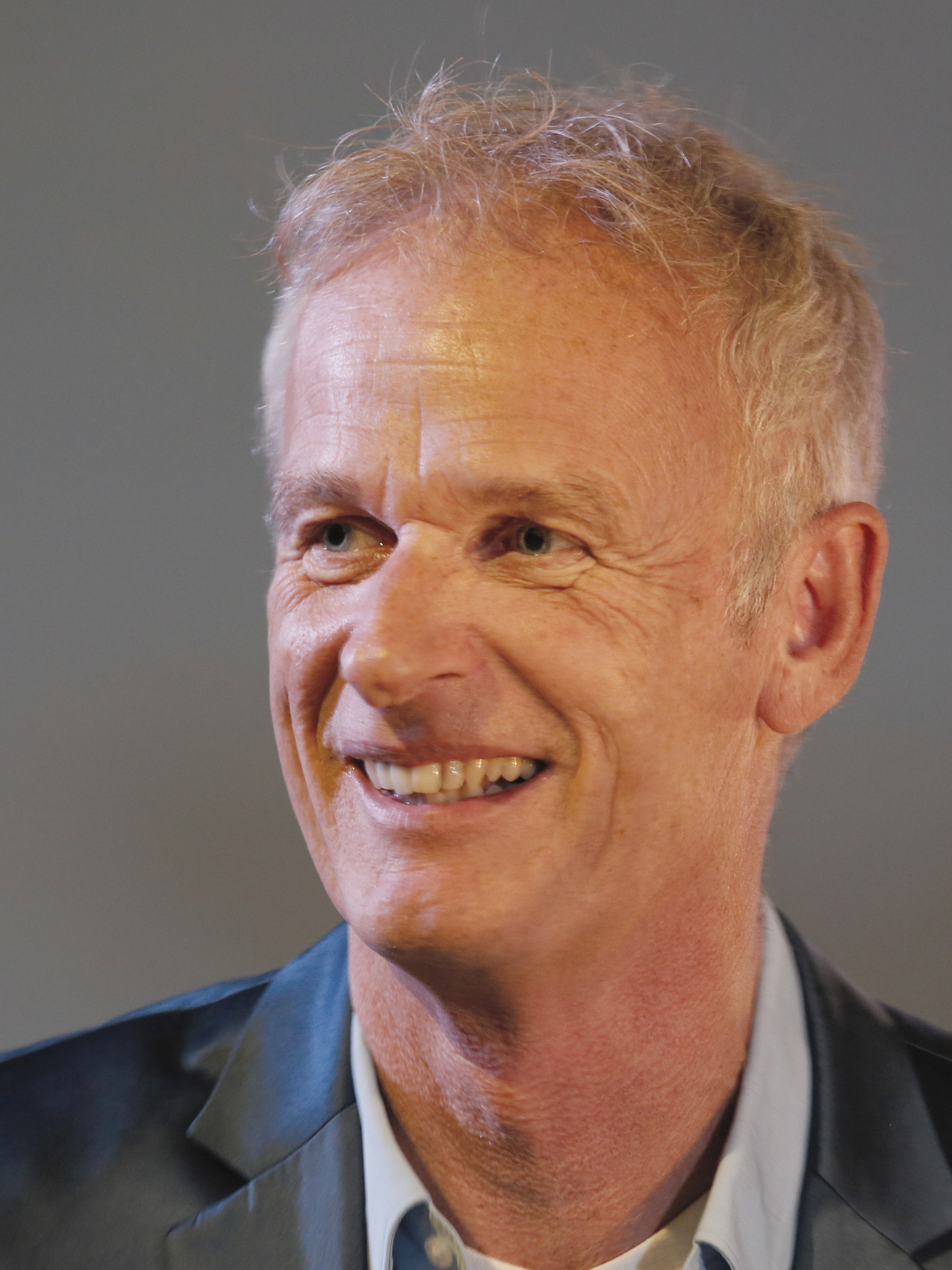
Cor Bakker (2017)

Cor Bakker (born 19 August 1961) is a Dutch pianist.

Bakker was born at Landsmeer. He rose to fame playing in De Schreeuw van De Leeuw, a television show starring Paul de Leeuw He has had his own Radio Show called Music Minded, which he continued on television titled Cor & Co from 1996 until 2001. He also hosted Cor op Reis, a travel documentary series.

It was announced in July 2018 that he would participate on the trivia gameshow The Smartest Person.
