= Mr Blue (Yazoo song) =

1983 song by Yazoo

Song by Yazoo

from the album You and Me Both
- Released: 1983
- Genre: Synth-pop
- Length: 3:26
- Label: Mute
- Songwriter(s): Vince Clarke
- Producer(s): Eric Radcliffe; Yazoo

"Mr Blue" is a song by English synth-pop duo Yazoo, which was released in 1983 on their second and final studio album You and Me Both. The song, written by Vince Clarke, was notably covered by Dutch singer René Klijn in 1993.

== Yazoo version ==
=== Background ===
"Mr Blue" was one of five tracks to be written by Clarke for You and Me Both. It was recorded at Blackwing Studios in London and produced by Yazoo with Eric Radcliffe. Speaking to Melody Maker in 1983, Clarke commented, "You and Me Both [is] probably more serious than the last album. Alison's always written serious lyrics. I've had a bash at it. 'Mr Blue' is about an emotion called... Mr Blue, like a person."

=== Critical reception ===
In a review of You and Me Both, Gavin Martin of New Musical Express described the song as a "shimmering", "beautifully crisp" and "evocative" song which "pinpoint[s] the outcome of the last four years of harsh political strictures". He also noted the song's "genuinely heartbreaking melody which has that bristling shiver down the spine which hallmarks classic pop from all eras past". Mark Cooper of Number One considered both "Mr Blue" and "Unmarked" to show Clarke "develop[ing] his social conscience" and "dealing military madness a blow or two".

Audio described the song as having a mood of "outer-space solitude". Stuart Cohn of Rolling Stone picked "Mr Blue" and "Softly Over" as the best songs on the album, with both setting "ambiguously worded love lyrics to traditional-sounding, hymn-like melodies".

=== Personnel ===
Yazoo

- Alison Moyet – vocals, producer
- Vince Clarke – instrumentation, producer

Additional personnel

- Eric Radcliffe – producer

== René Klijn version ==
"Mr. Blue"

Single by René Klijn
- Released: 1993
- Length: 3:45
- Label: Polydor
- Songwriter(s): Vince Clarke
- Producer(s): Cor Bakker; John van Eijk; René Klijn

"Mr. Blue" was recorded by the Dutch singer and model René Klijn in 1993 and became a number one hit in the Netherlands.

=== Background ===
Klijn originally performed "Mr. Blue" at the end of his appearance on Paul de Leeuw's De Schreeuw van De Leeuw in November 1992. Klijn appeared on the show to discuss his illness with AIDS. Leading up to his appearance, Klijn requested to perform "Mr. Blue" at the end of the show and he agreed that De Leeuw could accompany him by singing with him during the chorus.

The broadcast was viewed by millions and provided a greater awareness of the disease across the country. Klijn then recorded a studio version of the song, which featured contributions from Cor Bakker, Candy Dulfer and John van Eijk. It was released as a single in early 1993 and reached No. 1 on the Dutch Single Top 100 and Dutch Top 40 charts. It became the country's best selling single of the year, with all proceeds donated to an AIDS foundation. Klijn died on 5 September 1993.

=== Track listing ===
CD single

1. "Mr. Blue" – 3:45
2. "I Need You" – 3:30
3. "My Best Friend" – 5:10
4. "Mr. Blue" (live recording from De Schreeuw van De Leeuw, 28 November 1992) – 3:53

=== Personnel ===
Mr. Blue

- René Klijn – vocals, producer
- Mildred Douglas – backing vocals
- Cor Bakker – grand piano, arranger, leader, producer
- Gerard Peters – guitar
- Candy Dulfer – saxophone
- John van Eijk – synthesizer, producer
- Charlie Angenois – bass
- Gerhard Jeltes – drums

=== Charts ===
Chart (1993)	Peak position
Europe (European Hot 100 Singles)	52
Netherlands (Dutch Top 40)	1
Netherlands (Single Top 100)	1

== Other versions ==
- In 1986, former Flying Pickets members Brian Hibbard and Red Stripe released a version of the song as a single under the name Brian & Stripe. As their only release, it failed to enter the UK Singles Chart. The Flying Pickets had previously reached the Christmas number one spot in 1983 with an a cappella cover of Yazoo's "Only You".
