= You and Me Both =

1983 studio album by Yazoo

Studio album by Yazoo (Yaz)
- Released: 4 July 1983
- Recorded: November 1982 – February 1983
- Studio: Blackwing (London)
- Genre: Synth-pop
- Length: 40:32
- Label: Mute
- Producers: Eric Radcliffe; Yazoo

Yazoo (Yaz) chronology
| Upstairs at Eric's (1982) | You and Me Both (1983) | Only Yazoo (1999) |

Singles from You and Me Both
- 1. "Nobody's Diary" Released: 9 May 1983

You and Me Both is the second and final studio album by English synth-pop duo Yazoo (known in North America as Yaz), released on 4 July 1983 in the United Kingdom by Mute Records and in North America by Sire Records. The album's title was an ironic reference to the fact that the duo had grown estranged from each other and recorded much of the album separately; they announced their split a few weeks before the album's release.

You and Me Both gave the group a "posthumous" number-one record in the United Kingdom and New Zealand, and reached number 69 in the United States. Singer Alison Moyet began a successful solo career, while Vince Clarke formed the short-lived project the Assembly with Yazoo's producer Eric Radcliffe before going on to greater and long-lasting success with the synth-pop duo Erasure.

== Recording ==
The problems within Yazoo had started even before the recording of You and Me Both. Clarke had never envisioned the band as a long-term project, and was ready to move on after making Upstairs at Eric's, but having already walked out of Depeche Mode after just one album he was persuaded that it would not be a good idea to do the same thing again only a year later. Moyet said, "I think the second album happened because of advice from his publisher, because Vince'd done one album with Depeche and had walked, and then he'd done one album with me and he was ready to walk then. I think that his publisher was going, 'You're mad – you shouldn't be doing this, you should make at least one more record'. But even as we began the second album we knew that it was over, he had already decided he didn't want to work with me anymore." Moyet tried to convince Clarke to reconsider his decision to quit after making a second album, but to no avail.

As with their debut album Upstairs at Eric's, the record was recorded and produced by Yazoo and Eric Radcliffe at Radcliffe's Blackwing Studios in south-east London. However, unlike Upstairs at Eric's which was recorded quickly and mostly at night or early morning due to the studio already being booked during the daytime, Yazoo were able to record You and Me Both "nine to five" and over a longer period of time (the album took four months to make). This suited Clarke, who told Melody Maker, "I think this album was more planned, and to be honest that's the way I like to work". On the other hand, Moyet, whose background was the unpredictability of punk bands and pub rock and who had enjoyed the spontaneous recording process of the first album, complained that, "I just can't work under conditions that I think are contrived, everything has to be done really quickly". Another bone of contention for Moyet was Clarke's refusal to be involved in promotional work for the album, leaving Moyet to talk to the press alone: Clarke freely admitted that "towards the end of the album it was mostly me in the studio because Alison was doing a lot of promotional stuff that I wasn't prepared to do ... I couldn't be bothered". Moyet recalled just how little communication there was between the two of them while making the album: "He'd go in in the mornings, I'd go in in the evenings, he'd do something then later I'd do something on top of it. It was like a patchwork album where there was no discussion or getting excited about each others' things. We just worked separately."

== Writing and composition ==
Despite the tense atmosphere between the duo, Moyet said the only serious argument she and Clarke had during recording of the album was over the song "Happy People", which she refused to sing. She told The Quietus in 2011, "There are just some places you can't go, I tried singing that song a couple of times but I couldn't genuinely bring anything to it so I wouldn't do it. But that's the only time I ever refused a song." As a result, Clarke ended up singing on the track, the only Yazoo song on which he sings lead vocals. Clarke said that "Happy People" was written about the Liberal Party of which his mother had just become a member, but he declined to say whether the song was in support or against the party. "Unmarked" represents a rare excursion for Yazoo from the topic of love, although Clarke would only say it was "about war".

Speaking about her own compositions Moyet said, "I think some of the songs are personal, but a lot of it is just imagination, I look at other people and put myself in their shoes". For example, "Nobody's Diary" was written when she was 16 and had yet to experience a real relationship. Of "Ode to Boy" she said, "[it] started being of someone I knew, but ended up being more of a poetic exercise". Moyet later re-recorded the track for her 1994 album Essex in a more acoustic style, which she explained was more consistent with how she envisioned the song to have sounded when she originally wrote it. The album's closing track, "And On", is "about death. It came after talking to different friends who had lost somebody close to them. It's saying that it is better for a young person to die like this than being a vegetable. He might have died young, but he had a good life."

The song "Mr. Blue" was covered by Dutch singer René Klijn in early 1993. Suffering from AIDS at the time, Klijn wanted the single to be his musical testament before he died. The song went to number one in the Netherlands for six weeks in April/May 1993, and became the biggest-selling single of the year. Klijn died a few months later on 5 September 1993.

== Artwork ==
The album's artwork was created by design team 23 Envelope, who at the time were also designing many of the album covers for another British independent label, 4AD. The photographs were taken by 23 Envelope's Nigel Grierson. The album cover photograph, showing two Dalmatian dogs fighting while barely visible against a snowy outdoor scene, was chosen by Moyet as it represented how she felt at the time. In the 2008 interview on the In Your Room DVD Moyet remembered how she had selected the photograph:

"I remember being sent down to see this photographer for the album sleeve and I remember I was in a black mood, and he was showing me his portfolio, just showing me what kind of pictures he could take, and as a part of the portfolio was the picture of the two dogs snarling, and I just said, 'We'll have that', and I left".

== Critical reception ==
Professional ratings
Review scores
| Source | Rating |
|---|---|
| AllMusic | 4/5 stars |
| Number One | 3/5 stars |
| Record Mirror | 1/5 stars |
| Robert Christgau | B |
| Rolling Stone | 4/5 stars |
| Sounds | 5/5 stars |

NME said, "Well over half this record puts pop's foremost maverick duo in a superlative master class where finely detailed atmospherics are matched to unbridled sensuality and compassion to make it the prime pop music of its time... You and Me Both is a record of loss, yearning, warmth, anger and defiance, and it stands as one of 1983's major achievements." However, Melody Maker felt that the tension between the duo had affected their music, observing that "considering the upheavals and the onset of disillusionment, it was only to be expected that the quark, strangeness and charm of Upstairs at Eric's would be hard to match. Sure enough, the new album reflects the problems ... You and Me Both is a far more accessible, far straighter, more direct, more open, more commercial and far less intriguing affair ... You and Me Both desperately shows that the duo were beginning to grow further apart, and perhaps it's as well they split while the going was good. It's not a bad album, it's actually very well played and the vocals and atmospherics are delightful, but the material is simply not as challenging or as unexpected as we could have hoped for."

AllMusic considered that You and Me Both was "perhaps a more consistent collection overall than the first album, this one demonstrates that the duo was anything but played out. While both have gone on to successful careers, you can't help regretting that this was the end of Yaz."

== Track listing ==
Side one

1. "Nobody's Diary" (Alison Moyet) – 4:30
2. "Softly Over" (Vince Clarke) – 4:01
3. "Sweet Thing" (Moyet) – 3:41
4. "Mr. Blue" (Clarke) – 3:24
5. "Good Times" (Moyet) – 4:18

Side two

1. "Walk Away from Love" (Clarke) – 3:18
2. "Ode to Boy" (Moyet) – 3:35
3. "Unmarked" (Clarke) – 3:34
4. "Anyone" (Moyet) – 3:24
5. "Happy People" (Clarke) – 2:56
6. "And On" (Moyet) – 3:12
- The North American version of You and Me Both features "State Farm" (the B-side of the "Nobody's Diary" single) instead of "Happy People".

== Personnel ==
- Alison Moyet – vocals
- Vince Clarke – instrumentation; vocals (on "Happy People")
- The Sapphires – backing vocals on "Walk Away from Love"

== Charts ==
=== Weekly charts ===
Weekly chart performance for You and Me Both
| Chart (1983) | Peak position |
|---|---|
| Australian Albums (Kent Music Report) | 21 |
| Canada Top Albums/CDs (RPM) | 33 |
| Dutch Albums (Album Top 100) | 11 |
| Finnish Albums (Suomen virallinen lista) | 17 |
| German Albums (Offizielle Top 100) | 15 |
| Icelandic Albums (Tónlist) | 4 |
| Japanese Albums Chart (Oricon) | 72 |
| New Zealand Albums (RMNZ) | 1 |
| Spanish Albums (AFYVE) | 22 |
| Swedish Albums (Sverigetopplistan) | 4 |
| UK Albums (Official Charts) | 1 |
| UK Independent Albums (MRIB) | 1 |
| US Billboard 200 | 69 |

| Chart (2025) | Peak position |
|---|---|
| Croatian International Albums (HDU) | 39 |

=== Year-end charts ===
Year-end chart performance for You and Me Both
| Chart (1983) | Position |
|---|---|
| New Zealand Albums (RMNZ) | 31 |
| UK Albums (Gallup) | 37 |

== Certifications ==
Certifications for You and Me Both
| Region | Certification | Certified units/sales |
|---|---|---|
| United Kingdom (BPI) | Gold | 100,000^{^} |
^{^} Shipments figures based on certification alone.
