= Situation (song) =

1982 single by Yazoo

- Artwork for 1982 US release

Single by Yazoo

from the album Upstairs at Eric's
- A-side: "Only You"
- B-side: "Remix (12-inch)"
- Released: 1982
- Recorded: January 1982
- Genre: Synth-pop; dance-pop; new wave; dance-rock
- Length: 2:22 (UK B-side); 3:44 (US 7-inch single); 5:40 (US 12-inch single)
- Label: Mute; Sire
- Songwriters: Alison Moyet; Vince Clarke
- Producers: Eric Radcliffe; Daniel Miller; Vince Clarke

Yazoo singles chronology
"Don't Go" (1982)	"Situation" (1982)	"The Other Side of Love" (1982)

"Situation"
A 19-second sample of "Situation" demonstrating the synthesizer hook and the laugh that has been sampled by other artists.

"Situation" is a 1982 single by British synth-pop band Yazoo. The song was released in the UK as the B-side to Yazoo's debut single "Only You", which went to number two on the UK singles chart. Released as a single in North America, the song peaked at number 73 on the Billboard Hot 100 chart in the US, and hit the top 40 in Canadian charts, peaking at number 31. In late-summer 1982 it became Yazoo's first song to top the Billboard Hot Dance Club Play chart, remaining at number one on this chart for four weeks. It also crossed over to the Black Singles chart, peaking at number 31.

Its most well-known version is the U.S. 12-inch remix by François Kevorkian. This version was included on the U.S. version of Yazoo's debut album Upstairs at Eric's (1982), and it is the version of the song which receives the most radio airplay in the United States (where the song, despite its modest showing on the Hot 100, is still played on alternative, variety-hits and dance-oriented radio stations).

In 1990, and again in 1999, the song was remixed by several noted DJs, including Peter Rauhofer and Richard "Humpty" Vission. The 1999 remixes were released to dance clubs. In October of the same year, this renewed interest in the song sent "Situation" to number one on the Billboard Hot Dance Club Play chart for a second time.

In 2006, Slant ranked the song at number 64 in its list of the "100 Greatest Dance Songs".

The song was heavily sampled in the Saturdays' 2008 debut single "If This Is Love". Moyet's laugh at the start of the track has been sampled on several different recordings, including the 1995 smash dance hit "Macarena" by Los del Río. The song was also interpolated by Heidi Montag for the 2009 single "Body Language."

Tom Jones covered the song on his 1994 album The Lead and How to Swing It.

== Background ==
In a 1982 interview with the NME, Moyet expressed some dissatisfaction over the single: "It's great that [it's] doing so well in the States, although I'm not too happy with the record itself. I think it's pretty shoddy actually! It was remixed from the version on the B-side of 'Only You', but we didn't really have much of a say in how it turned out. I think it could have been a lot better if the record company had taken a bit of time instead of rushing it out so quickly over there."

== Versions ==
The original version's first chorus does not have the response lyrics. The 7-inch version skips to the verses before the first chorus with response lyrics.

== Track listings ==
=== 1982 release ===
- UK 7-inch single (Mute Records 7MUTE020)
1. "Only You" – 3:11
2. "Situation" – 2:22
- UK 12-inch single (Mute 12MUTE020)
1. "Only You" – 3:11
2. "Situation (Extended Version)" – 5:18
- US 7-inch single (Sire Records 7-29953)
1. "Situation" – 3:44
2. "Situation (Dub Version) – 3:13
- US 12-inch single (Sire 0-29950)
1. "Situation" – 5:40
2. "Situation (Dub Version)" – 5:45

=== 1990 remixes ===
- 7-inch single (Mute Records YAZ4)
1. "Situation (Deadline Mix Edit)"
2. "State Farm (Madhouse Mix Edit)"
- 12-inch single (Mute 12YAZ4 / Sire/Warner Bros. 21812-0)
1. "Situation (The Aggressive Attitude Mix)"
2. "Situation (Deadline Mix)"
3. "State Farm (Madhouse Mix)"
- CD single (Mute CDYAZ4 / Sire/Warner Bros. 21812-2)
1. "Situation (Single Remix)"
2. "State Farm (Madhouse Mix Edit)"
3. "Situation (The Aggressive Attitude Mix)"
4. "Situation (Space Dub)"

=== 1999 remixes ===
- 12-inch single (Mute 12YAZ6)
1. "Situation (Club 69 Speed Mix)"
2. "Situation (Richard "Humpty" Vission Visits The Dub)"
3. "Situation (Richard "Humpty" Vission Instrumental)"
- 12-inch single (Mute L12YAZ6)
1. "Situation (Dave Ralph's Tea Freaks English Breakfast Mix)
2. "Situation (Club 69 Speed Dub)"
- CD single (Mute CD YAZ 6)
1. "Situation (Club 69 Radio Mix)"
2. "Situation (Club 69 Speed Mix)"
3. "Situation (Richard 'Humpty' Vission Visits the Dome Mix)"
4. "Situation (Dave Ralph's Tea Freaks English Breakfast Mix)"
5. "Situation (Deadline Mix)"
6. "State Farm (Madhouse Mix)"
7. "Situation (Daniel Miller/Mark Saunders 12-inch Mix)"
8. "State Farm (Play-Doh Dub)"
9. "Situation (Original US Dub)"

== Accolades ==
Year	Publisher	Country	Accolade	Rank
1982	The Village Voice	United States	"Singles of the Year" (26)	20
2005	Blender	United States	"Top 500 Songs of the 80s-00s"	417
2006	Slant Magazine	United States	"100 Greatest Dance Songs"	64
2011	Robert Dimery	United Kingdom	"1001 Songs You Must Hear Before You Die"	*
2011	Treble	United States	"Top 200 Songs of the '80s"	168

(*) indicates the list is unordered.

== Charts ==
=== Original version ===
==== Weekly charts ====
Chart (1982)	Peak position
Belgium (Ultratop 50 Flanders)	7
Canada Top Singles (RPM)	31
Finland (Suomen virallinen lista)	16
Netherlands (Dutch Top 40)	16
Netherlands (Single Top 100)	18
US Billboard Hot 100	73
US Hot Black Singles (Billboard)	31
US Hot Dance Club Play (Billboard)	1

==== Year-end charts ====
Chart (1982)	Position
Belgium (Ultratop 50 Flanders)	88
US Top Disco/Dance Singles/Albums (Billboard)	6

=== Situation '90 ===
Chart (1990–1991)	Peak position
Belgium (Ultratop 50 Flanders)	38
France (SNEP)	40
Germany (GfK)	36
Luxembourg (Radio Luxembourg)	10
UK Singles (Official Charts)	14
US Hot Dance Club Play (Billboard)	46
US Hot Dance Music/Maxi-Singles Sales (Billboard)	28

=== 1999 remixes ===
Chart (1999)	Peak position
Belgium (Ultratip Bubbling Under Flanders)	17
U.S. Hot Dance Club Play (Billboard)	1
U.S. Hot Dance Music/Maxi-Singles Sales (Billboard)	8

== See also ==
- List of number-one dance singles of 1982 (U.S.)
- List of number-one dance singles of 1999 (U.S.)
