= Upstairs at Eric's =

1982 studio album by Yazoo

Studio album by Yazoo (Yaz)
- Released: 20 August 1982
- Recorded: 1982
- Studio: Blackwing (London)
- Genres: Synth-pop; new wave; proto-techno; electropop
- Length: 40:29
- Label: Mute
- Producers: E.C. Radcliffe; Yazoo

Yazoo (Yaz) chronology
Upstairs at Eric's (1982)	You and Me Both (1983)

Singles from Upstairs at Eric's
- 1. "Only You" Released: 15 March 1982 (UK); 2. "Don't Go" Released: 2 July 1982 (UK); 3. "Situation" Released: July 1982 (US/Canada)

Upstairs at Eric's is the debut album by English synth-pop duo Yazoo (known in North America as Yaz). It was released on 20 August 1982 by Mute Records. It was produced by the band and E.C. Radcliffe, with assistance from Mute label boss Daniel Miller on some of the tracks. Named after producer Radcliffe's Blackwing Studios where the album was recorded, Upstairs at Eric's was preceded by two UK top-three singles, the ballad "Only You" and the more uptempo "Don't Go". The album reached number two on the UK Albums Chart and has been certified platinum by the British Phonographic Industry (BPI), denoting shipments in excess of 300,000 copies in the United Kingdom.

Against the group's wishes, "Situation", originally the B-side of "Only You" in the UK and Europe, was released as the band's debut single in the United States and Canada, where a remixed version of the song by DJ François Kevorkian reached number one on Billboard's Club Play Singles chart. "Situation" peaked at number 73 on the US Billboard Hot 100, while it reached the top 40 in Canada, peaking at number 31. The North American version of the album subsequently replaced the remixed version of "Situation" for the UK album track "Tuesday". Upstairs at Eric's reached number 92 on the Billboard 200 in the US and number 49 on RPM's albums chart in Canada.

== Recording and composition ==
Following the success of their debut single "Only You", Vince Clarke and Alison Moyet rapidly recorded the album to maintain their high profile. As Clarke's only previous experience of a recording studio had been Blackwing Studios in south-east London, where he had made Depeche Mode's debut album Speak & Spell, his immediate thought was to record Yazoo's album there as well: he said later, "I didn't know of any other studios, so I just assumed that Blackwing was the only studio I could record at". However, when the duo arrived at Blackwing they found that not only was Daniel Miller unavailable to produce the album, contrary to Clarke's expectations, but the main studios had already been booked out during the daytime by Fad Gadget, another Mute label act. Instead Clarke and Moyet had to record the album in the early mornings with studio owner Eric (E.C.) Radcliffe overseeing most of the recording process, turning up around 5 or 6 a.m. and working until 11 a.m. each day in whichever of the two studio spaces were available at the time.

On the 30th anniversary of Upstairs at Eric's in 2012 Clarke told The Quietus that there had been no grand plan for the album's creation:

We just came together and it was a bit of a mish-mash really. There was no concept or theme running through the album; we were just messing about in the studio. Part of the charm of that album is a naivety. There really wasn't a profound concept that was running through the recording. I didn't really know what I was doing in the studio and Alison hadn't much experience of being in a recording studio, so everything was new. We'd make one sound and we'd think it was great and just stop there and wouldn't make any more sounds. It wasn't like we were continually honing or over-producing songs because everything at the time sounded fresh. That's why a lot of the tracks only have eight or nine elements to them.

Clarke's compositions "I Before E Except After C" and "In My Room" explore the use of cut-up vocals, including his own spoken word voice. "I Before E Except After C" features both Moyet and the mother of producer Eric Radcliffe separately reading out the instruction manual for one of the pieces of studio equipment, with Moyet struggling to keep herself from laughing.

Moyet later described how her song "Goodbye 70's" had been inspired by her disillusionment with how the late-1970s punk scene had turned out, saying, "'Goodbye 70's' is about punk and not caring how you were dressed, and then I discovered that so many of my friends that I'd thought it all really meant something to just saw it as another trend... That's what 'Goodbye 70's' was all about, about how sour the whole thing became."

== Artwork ==
The album cover depicts two apparently male mannequins in a sparsely furnished loft, facing each other over a table, with the lower part of the dummies' bodies seated on pushed back chairs while the upper portions are perched on the edges of the table. It was shot by photographer Joe Lyons at his first photo studio in north London, and he described how he had set up the shot:

"I'd just shot some furniture for a furniture designer, and got paid with the furniture. I chose dummies and started work—a fortuitous series of events. I felt that the hi-tech furniture worked really well with the rough look of the room, and I put the cake—which was actually the top of my wedding cake—as a focus on the table."

The original UK CD release of Upstairs at Eric's in 1986 featured a close-up of part of the original album cover. Another photograph from the same session was used as the cover for the Yazoo box set In Your Room in 2008.

== Critical reception ==
Professional ratings
Review scores
Source	Rating
AllMusic	4/5 stars
Encyclopedia of Popular Music	4/5 stars
The Philadelphia Inquirer	1/5 stars
Rolling Stone	3/5 stars
Smash Hits	8½/10
Sounds	5/5 stars
The Village Voice	B+

Melody Maker hailed Upstairs at Eric's as "an album of rich, dark passion, forever burying the hoary old moan that electronics and synthesizers will never be any good because they don't have a button on the front that says 'emotion'". Smash Hits reviewer Ian Cranna wrote: "The singles and their cousins here are simply brilliant – a wonderful mixture of Vince's superbly arranged synth-pop (his great strength) and Alf's glorious voice (her great strength)."

Lynn Hanna of NME was more critical, feeling that "Upstairs at Eric's is an LP of trial and some error, and it shows all the signs of a collaboration that's still in a promising infancy. The writing is divided almost equally between the two, and at their best each acts as an excellent foil to the other... A little too often, though, this LP speaks of two disparate pasts rather than one new Yazoo facing the future." Ken Tucker of The Philadelphia Inquirer gave the album a one star out of five rating, referred to Yaz as "stiff-voiced monotony fans" and saying that the group were "even more pretentious than most, working the Lord's Prayer into [their] tedious synthesizer rhythms."

In a retrospective review, David Jeffries of AllMusic compared the album with Clarke's other debut with Depeche Mode the previous year, stating "While Speak and Spell is, by far, the more consistent record, Upstairs at Eric's is wholly more satisfying, beating the Depeche record on substance and ambition, and is light years ahead in emotion... The clumsier experimental tracks make most people head for the hits collection, but to do so would be to miss the album's great twist... Like its curious cover, Upstairs at Eric's presents a fractured, well-lit, and paranoid urban landscape."

=== Accolades ===
Upstairs at Eric's was placed at number 6 on the NME critics' list of albums of the year for 1982, while "Only You" was listed as the number 7 single and "Don't Go" as the number 14 single that same year. The album was also named as one of Sounds magazine's top twenty albums of 1982.

In 1989 Record Mirror placed Upstairs at Eric's at number 35 on their list of the best albums of the 1980s.

== Track listing ==
Side one
No.	Title	Writer(s)	Length
1.	"Don't Go"	Vince Clarke	3:08
2.	"Too Pieces"	Clarke	3:14
3.	"Bad Connection"	Clarke	3:20
4.	"I Before E Except After C"	Clarke	4:36
5.	"Midnight"	Alison Moyet	4:22
6.	"In My Room"	Clarke	3:52

Side two
No.	Title	Writer(s)	Length
7.	"Only You"	Clarke	3:14
8.	"Goodbye 70's"	Moyet	2:35
9.	"Tuesday"	Clarke	3:22
10.	"Winter Kills"	Moyet	4:06
11.	"Bring Your Love Down (Didn't I)"	Moyet	4:40
Total length:			40:29

- North American releases of Upstairs at Eric's features François Kevorkian's remix of "Situation" instead of "Tuesday". The 1990 European CD re-release appends the 12" remixes of "Situation" and "The Other Side of Love" to the above track listing. The 2018 UK box set and 2019 LP reissue contain the original LP track listing above.

Bonus tracks on 1990 CD re-release
No.	Title	Writer(s)	Length
12.	"Situation" (US 12")	Clarke, Moyet	5:45
13.	"The Other Side of Love" (US 12")	Clarke, Moyet	5:19
Total length:			51:13

== Personnel ==
- Alison Moyet – vocals, piano
- Vince Clarke – instrumentation, spoken words on "I Before E Except After C" and "In My Room"

Additional personnel

- Daniel Miller – additional production and noises on "Don't Go", "Too Pieces", "In My Room", "Only You" and "Situation"
- "Eric's mum" (the mother of producer Eric Radcliffe) – extra chit-chat on "I Before E Except After C"
- D. Davis – extra chit-chat on "In My Room"

== Charts ==
=== Weekly charts ===
Weekly chart performance for Upstairs at Eric's
Chart (1982)	Peak position
Australian Albums (Kent Music Report)	10
Canada Top Albums/CDs (RPM)	49
Dutch Albums (Album Top 100)	9
Finnish Albums (Suomen virallinen lista)	4
German Albums (Offizielle Top 100)	14
Iceland (Dagblaðið Vísir)	3
Italian Albums (TV Sorrisi e Canzoni)	20
Japanese Albums Chart (Oricon)	78
New Zealand Albums (RMNZ)	9
Spanish Albums (AFYVE)	4
Swedish Albums (Sverigetopplistan)	11
UK Albums (Official Charts)	2
UK Independent Albums (MRIB)	1
US Billboard 200	92
US Top R&B/Hip-Hop Albums (Billboard)	37

=== Year-end charts ===
1982 year-end chart performance for Upstairs at Eric's
Chart (1982)	Position
Australian Albums (Kent Music Report)	78
Dutch Albums (Dutch Top 100)	66
UK Albums (BMRB)	14

1983 year-end chart performance for Upstairs at Eric's
Chart (1983)	Position
UK Albums (Gallup)	68

== Certifications and sales ==
Certifications and sales for Upstairs at Eric's
Region	Certification	Certified units/sales
United Kingdom (BPI)	Platinum	300,000^{^}
United States (RIAA)	Platinum	1,000,000^{^}
Yugoslavia	—	85,000
^{^} Shipments figures based on certification alone.

== Release history ==
Region	Date	Label	Format	Catalog
United Kingdom	20 August 1982	Mute	LP	STUMM 7
United Kingdom	20 August 1982	Mute	cassette	C STUMM 7
United States	1982	Sire	LP	1-23737
United States	1982	Sire	cassette	23737-4
Canada	1982	Sire	LP	92 37371
Germany	1983	Mute	CD	600015
France	1983	Mute/Vogue	CD	600015/VG 651
United Kingdom	1986	Mute	CD	CD STUMM 7
United States	1987	Sire	CD	9 23737-2
Canada	1987	Sire	CD	CD 23737
Europe	1990	Mute/Intercord Ton	CD	INT 846.803
United Kingdom & Europe	9 June 2008	Mute	Remastered CD	CDXSTUMM7
United States	24 July 2012	Mobile Fidelity Sound Lab	Remastered LP	MOFI 1-020
