= Don't Go (Yazoo song) =

1982 single by Yazoo

- Artwork for 12-inch remix vinyl release

Single by Yazoo

from the album Upstairs at Eric's
- B-side: "Winter Kills"
- Released: 5 July 1982
- Genre: Synth-pop; new wave; experimental pop
- Length: 2:53
- Label: Mute; Sire
- Songwriter: Vince Clarke
- Producers: Eric Radcliffe; Daniel Miller; Vince Clarke

Yazoo singles chronology
"Only You" (1982)	"Don't Go" (1982)	"Situation" (1982)

Music video
- "Don't Go" on YouTube

"Don't Go" is a song by British synth-pop band Yazoo (known in the US and Canada as Yaz). It was released on 5 July 1982 as the second single from their debut album, Upstairs at Eric's (20 August 1982). The song peaked at number three on the UK Singles Chart, becoming Yazoo's second top 5 hit. In the US, where the band was known as Yaz, the song was their second big hit on the American dance chart, where it spent two weeks at number one in October 1982. Their first American dance chart hit was "Situation", which had also gone to number one on this chart earlier the same year. The music video for the song features band members Alison Moyet and Vince Clarke in a sort of haunted mansion with Clarke cast in the role of Victor Frankenstein. The song re-entered the UK Dance Chart on 13 December 2009 at number 30, peaking at number 15 on 2 January 2010.

== Critical reception ==
Adrian Thrills of NME picked "Don't Go" as the magazine's "single of the week" and described it as a "slice of melodrama that knocks the rest of this week's releases into a cocked hat in terms of impact and intensity". He added that, as the "first full exposition of their talent" following the "delightful" "Only You", "Don't Go" "builds busily to a strident crescendo as Clarke juggles with a shrill synth motif that jostles with Alf's booming, swelling vocals". Ian Birch of Smash Hits considered the song to be a "sharp successor" to "Only You". He commented: "Vince coaxes a sterling song out of his synthesizer while Alf balances its metallic clip with a deep, emotion-packed vocal that gets better with every hearing." Mark Cooper of Record Mirror described it as "a rather slight blues belter dignified by the singing and the synth break in the middle". He continued: "The combination of the voice and the machine is truly original and the B-side, 'Winter Kills', shows that Yazoo are capable of moods of substance."

== Formats and track listings ==
- UK 7" single (Mute 7 YAZ 001)
1. "Don't Go" – 2:53
2. "Winter Kills" – 4:02
- US 12" single (Sire 29886-0)
1. "Don't Go (Re-mix)" – 4:08
2. "Don't Go (Re-re-mix)" – 4:20
3. "Winter Kills (album version)" – 4:03

Note 1: "Winter Kills," the B-side to this single, is explicitly listed as "Not re-mixed" and "Not extended" on the album sleeve
Note 2: The US 12" single misprints the track lengths on the record, listing the "Re-mix" as 5:08 and the "Re-re-mix" as 3:20
Note 3: On some releases, both mixes of "Don't Go" were combined into/shown as one track with a length of 8:28

=== Other Mixes ===
1. "Don't Go" (Future Funk Squad Remix) - 5:35
  Taken from the 2008 Remixes Promo CD
2. "Don't Go" (Future Funk Squad Remix) - 5:35
  Taken from the 2008 Remixes Promo CD

== Charts ==
=== Weekly charts ===
Chart (1982)	Peak position
Australia (Kent Music Report)	6
Austria (Ö3 Austria Top 40)	6
Belgium (Ultratop 50 Flanders)	1
Denmark (Hitlisten)	13
Finland (Suomen virallinen lista)	7
France (IFOP)	3
Iceland (Dagblaðið Vísir)	1
Ireland (IRMA)	4
Italy (Musica e dischi)	22
Netherlands (Dutch Top 40)	2
Netherlands (Single Top 100)	6
New Zealand (Recorded Music NZ)	22
Poland (Lista Przebojów Programu Trzeciego)	12
Portugal (AFP)	2
South Africa (Springbok Radio)	9
Spain (AFYVE)	4
Sweden (Sverigetopplistan)	5
Switzerland (Schweizer Hitparade)	2
UK Singles (Official Charts)	3
US Hot Dance/Disco (Billboard)	1
West Germany (GfK)	4
Zimbabwe (ZIMA)	19

Chart (1999)	Peak position
Belgium (Ultratip Bubbling Under Flanders)	17
US Hot Dance Club Play (Billboard)	16
US Hot Dance Music/Maxi-Singles Sales (Billboard)	8

Chart (2000)	Peak position
France (SNEP)	91

Chart (2010)	Peak position
UK Dance (Official Charts)	15

=== Year-end charts ===
Chart (1982)	Rank
Australia (Kent Music Report)	70
Belgium (Ultratop 50 Flanders)	9
France (IFOP)	31
Netherlands (Dutch Top 40)	24
Netherlands (Single Top 100)	46

== Sales and certifications ==
Region	Certification	Certified units/sales
United Kingdom (BPI)	Gold	400,000^{‡}
^{^} Shipments figures based on certification alone.

== Other versions ==
The following artists have produced covers of or sampled the song:

- 1990 – Spanish act Latino Party sampled "Don't Go" for "The Party", the lead single of their debut album No Limits. In France, it reached number four on the French Singles Chart in October 1990 and charted for 20 weeks in the top 50, and achieved silver disc status after selling 200,000 units.
- 1993 – Dutch act Boobytrax (aka doop) released a house version of the song. Their version peaked at number 23 in the Netherlands and at number 36 in Sweden.
- 1995 – British singer Lizzy Mack had a UK number 52 hit with her version of the song.
- 2005 – Shawn Desman sampled Don't Go for "Let's Go" for his album Back for More.
- 2006 – Nouvelle Vague covered the song on their album Bande à Part.
- 2009 – The Kid Sister song "Big N Bad" from the album Ultraviolet contains interpolations of "Don't Go".
- 2009 – Smoove & Turrell covered "Don't Go" on their album Antique Soul.
- 2010 – Georgian-Greek singer Tamta sampled the synths of the song on her single "Fotia".
- 2011 – Slow Moving Millie covered the song on her album Renditions.
- 2019 – Estonian DJ Madison Mars sampled the synths of the song for his house song "New Vibe Who Dis" featuring Indianapolis Singer Little League.
- 2019 – English DJ Riton and Dutch DJ Oliver Heldens sampled the synths of the song on their future house song "Turn Me On", featuring British singer Vula.
- 2021 – English post-punk music duo Sleaford Mods covered the song as it has been a fan-favourite of the duo's live sets for some time.
- 2022 – Nancy Whang of LCD Soundsystem interpolates the song during performances of "Losing My Edge".

== Starting Rock featuring Diva Avari version ==
"Don't Go"

Single by Starting Rock featuring Diva Avari
- Released: 2006
- Length: 3:27
- Label: 541
- Songwriters: Vince Clarke; Alison Moyet
- Producers: Hédi Banon; Stéphane Tedesco

Starting Rock featuring Diva Avari singles chronology
"Don't Go" (2006)	"Movin' On" (2007)

The song was covered and remixed by French project Starting Rock featuring Diva Avari. It was released in December 2006 as a single and had modest success in Europe. It reached the top 10 in Finland.

=== Music video ===
The music video depicts a male at a club dancing with women. He meets Diva Avari, who has her eyes set on him and he cannot escape her throughout their time at the club.

=== Charts ===
Chart (2006)	Peak position
Belgium (Ultratip Bubbling Under Flanders)	10
Belgium (Ultratip Bubbling Under Wallonia)	10
Finland (Suomen virallinen lista)	3
France (SNEP)	24
Netherlands (Dutch Top 40)	34
Netherlands (Single Top 100)	42

== See also ==
- List of number-one dance singles of 1982 (U.S.)
