= Yazoo (band) =

English synth-pop duo

- Yazoo in 1982

Background information
- Also known as: Yaz
- Origin: Basildon, Essex, England
- Genres: Synth-pop; new wave
- Years active: 1981–1983; 2008; 2011
- Labels: Mute; Sire; Reprise
- Past members: Vince Clarke; Alison Moyet
- Website: yazooinfo.com

Yazoo (known as Yaz in North America) were an English synth-pop duo from Basildon, Essex, formed in late 1981 by Alison Moyet (vocals) and Vince Clarke (keyboards) after his departure from Depeche Mode. The pair released two albums, Upstairs at Eric's (1982) and You and Me Both (1983). Yazoo played a key role in shaping the emerging genre of synth-pop, and were particularly influential on the house music scene of the mid to late 1980s. The duo split in May 1983, with Moyet going on to launch a successful solo career and Clarke co-forming the Assembly and then Erasure. Yazoo later reunited for a tour in 2008.

== History ==
=== Formation and Upstairs at Eric's (1982) ===
Clarke and Moyet grew up in Basildon and attended the same Saturday music school when they were eleven years old. Clarke was inspired to make electronic music after hearing Wirral synth-pop group Orchestral Manoeuvres in the Dark (OMD). He became a co-founder of Depeche Mode, who in 1981 released an album and three Clarke-penned singles through Mute Records. Moyet spent her teens singing in various punk and blues bands in her home town. She placed an advert in the UK weekly music magazine Melody Maker in late 1981 asking for musicians to form a "rootsy" blues band after her most recent group, the Screamin' Ab Dabs, had broken up.

Moyet was surprised when the only reply she received was from Clarke, who had recently stunned the music press by quitting Depeche Mode. Despite growing up nearby, Moyet and Clarke did not know each other. Moyet had been in the same class at school as Martin Gore and Andy Fletcher who were Clark's bandmates in Depeche Mode. However, she had no prior contact with Clarke himself, remembering him as an outsider who, with his brothers, would wear t-shirts proclaiming their Christianity. Clarke had seen Moyet sing live a few times, as he was friends with her bandmate.

Clarke wanted to maintain his relationship with Mute, saying in a 2008 interview, "When I left Depeche I wasn't sure I'd still have a record deal and was keen to play the label something of my own, so I wrote the song 'Only You' but needed someone to demo it with. Alison happened to be advertising in a local paper so I called her." Believing that two band members were enough, Clarke opted for a "duo" configuration inspired by the likes of OMD and Soft Cell.

The pair came to the project with different tastes in music. In an early interview, Moyet stated that "I'm a traditionalist, I can't accept the fact of blues with synthesizers at all," while Clarke admitted to tolerating modern R&B outfits like Dr. Feelgood but disliked traditional blues artists such as Muddy Waters. Clarke took the "Only You" demo to Mute label boss Daniel Miller but recalled that at first Miller appeared to be uninterested:

"I tried to give it to Daniel and he didn't show much interest ... I brought it in and put it on, and the whole time it was playing, Daniel was messing around with a synthesizer. He said he liked it, but carried on doing what he was doing—and that was it. Only when the publishers took an interest did he brighten up."

Mute asked the duo to record the song as a single and to make an album together. By this point Clarke had already written "Don't Go", but both he and Moyet felt it was too good to be the B-side of "Only You", so they quickly wrote the song "Situation" together for the single's B-side.

According to Moyet, the name Yazoo was taken from the specialist blues record label Yazoo Records. This decision led to a £3.5 million lawsuit threat by the label over the band's name and, coupled with the fact that the name Yazoo was already in use by a lesser known American rock band, the group was renamed Yaz for the North American market.

"Only You" was released in the UK in March 1982 and rose to number two on the UK singles chart. The duo recorded their debut album at Blackwing Studios in southeast London, where Clarke had recorded Depeche Mode's album Speak & Spell the previous year. As the studio had already been booked during the day by fellow Mute artist Fad Gadget, Yazoo recorded most of the album during the early mornings. Clarke had expected that Miller would produce the album, but discovered that Miller was already otherwise occupied, so Blackwing studio owner Eric Radcliffe carried out production duties with Clarke and Moyet. The album was named Upstairs at Eric's in recognition of Radcliffe's input.

"Don't Go" was released in July 1982 as the second single in the UK and also reached the top three of the UK charts. In North America, "Situation" had been a hit in the clubs in a version remixed by New York City-based DJ François Kevorkian, and against the band's wishes, it was released as Yazoo's debut single in the US and Canada, where it reached number 73 on the Billboard Hot 100. "Only You" was released as Yazoo's second single in North America and reached number 67.

Upstairs at Eric's was released in the UK in August 1982, peaking at number two on the UK Albums Chart and going on to sell more than 300,000 copies and achieving platinum status. In the US, initial success was more modest and the album peaked at number 92 on the Billboard 200 album chart, but by 1989, seven years after its release, word of mouth had helped to push the album to platinum status for sales of over one million copies. The duo played 24 dates in support of the album across Europe and North America.

=== You and Me Both and disbandment (1983) ===
After releasing "The Other Side of Love" in the UK in November 1982, a non-album stopgap single that reached number 13 in the UK singles chart, the duo went back to Blackwing to record their second album. However, by now there was growing tension between the pair. Clarke had always seen Upstairs at Eric's as a one-off project and had to be persuaded to make another Yazoo record by his publishers, who felt it would not go down well if he was seen to walk out of a second band within a year of the first. Compounding this were issues of self-esteem for Moyet. At only 21 years of age, she was struggling to come to terms with being in the spotlight and the pressures of sudden fame, and she resented the fact that Clarke was leaving her to carry out all the promotional work for the records by herself. Unlike their first record, the second album was made over a longer period of four months and with Clarke and Moyet rarely in the studio together at the same time; Clarke would record instrumental tracks in the morning and Moyet would come in during the evening and record her vocals.

A single, "Nobody's Diary", was released in May 1983 ahead of the album and reached number three in the UK chart, but within days of the single's release, Yazoo announced that they were splitting up due to personal development reasons. The album, ironically titled You and Me Both, was released in the UK in July 1983 and topped the UK album charts, a feat it would also achieve in New Zealand. However, with no further singles or live appearances to promote it, it did not sell as well as Upstairs at Eric's, although it still achieved gold status in the UK for sales of 100,000 copies. In the US, You and Me Both peaked at number 69 on the Billboard 200.

Reflecting in 2008 on the group's split, both Moyet and Clarke agreed that a lack of communication between the pair had been a major reason for the breakdown of the partnership. Moyet recalled that Clarke "was creatively very encouraging, very open to hearing my ideas for songs. The thing I found difficult was the lack of warmth. I wanted to feel more likeable, and you can't feel likeable if someone doesn't want to interact with you." Clarke admitted that "I lacked the life-skills of communication in a relationship. I felt confident in the studio, but starting a chat with somebody ..." He put it down to the fact that because the duo became popular so rapidly, there had never been any time to build up a personal relationship between them:

"It all happened very fast and because we hadn't been in a band for years, playing in clubs, it was very much just a working relationship—we never had the chance to bond. We never really knew each other. Not really ... The fact that we never talked, never socialised together, meant that when problems came up we didn't know how to communicate and sort things out."

Moyet added that their differing personalities had not helped matters, saying, "He was, I think, sad at the time after leaving Depeche and remote, a bit angry, but it was all internalised. Whereas I was this disaffected, slightly aggressive ex-punk rocker where nothing was internalised. I was probably quite difficult to be around."

=== Legacy ===
Following Yazoo's split, Clarke formed the Assembly with Eric Radcliffe. Intending to record a series of one-off singles featuring different vocalists, in the end the Assembly produced just one single, "Never Never" with Feargal Sharkey, before also splitting up. Around this time, Clarke also produced the album The Peter Pan Effect for singer Robert Marlow, an old friend of both his and Moyet's. Clarke then teamed up with singer Andy Bell to form the successful synth-pop duo Erasure. Moyet spent several months out of the limelight before signing a deal with CBS Records and embarking on a successful solo career.

"Situation" was finally released as a single in the UK in 1990 in another remixed form, which was moderately successful, reaching number 14 on the UK singles chart. A compilation entitled Only Yazoo: The Best of was released in 1999 and was preceded by a re-release of Yazoo's debut single, "Only You", featuring a new remix of the title track and several more of "Don't Go". The band's output was book-ended with yet another release of "Situation", accompanied by many remixes. Clarke was chosen to remix Moyet's 1994 single "Whispering Your Name" and, with Erasure, Clarke and Moyet tried to record her single "This House" as a duet, but the project never happened because Sony Music would not permit it.

The band's songs have appeared in a number of films and television shows. In 1988, "In My Room", "Ode to Boy" and "Only You" were used in the film The Chocolate War (an adaption of the book of the same title). "Only You" was used in the film Napoleon Dynamite, the BBC television series The Office, the film Can't Hardly Wait, the Fringe episode "Transilience Thought Unifier Model-11", The Americans episode "Dimebag" and several episodes in season five of Once Upon a Time. A cover version of "Only You" by Joshua Radin was used in 2007 in a J. C. Penney commercial. Another cover of "Only You" was recorded by Selena Gomez for the 2017 Netflix television show 13 Reasons Why. "Don't Go" appeared in the BBC series I'm Alan Partridge and was used in the film Tango and Cash. The song "Situation" was used in the 1990 TV movie Exile and was also used in a Nintendo commercial highlighting the classic edition of the Game Boy Advance SP and the NES games ported to it. In 2007, "Bring Your Love Down (Didn't I)" was used in The Sarah Silverman Program episode "Not Without My Daughter".

Anohni, lead vocalist of Antony & the Johnsons, talked with Terry Gross in February 2009 about recording the debut self-titled Hercules and Love Affair album. She said she had been asked by New York-based DJ Andy Butler to join the project and that the objective was (or became) "Let's sound as much like Yazoo as we can ... We loved Yazoo."

=== 2008 reunion and 'Reconnected' tour ===
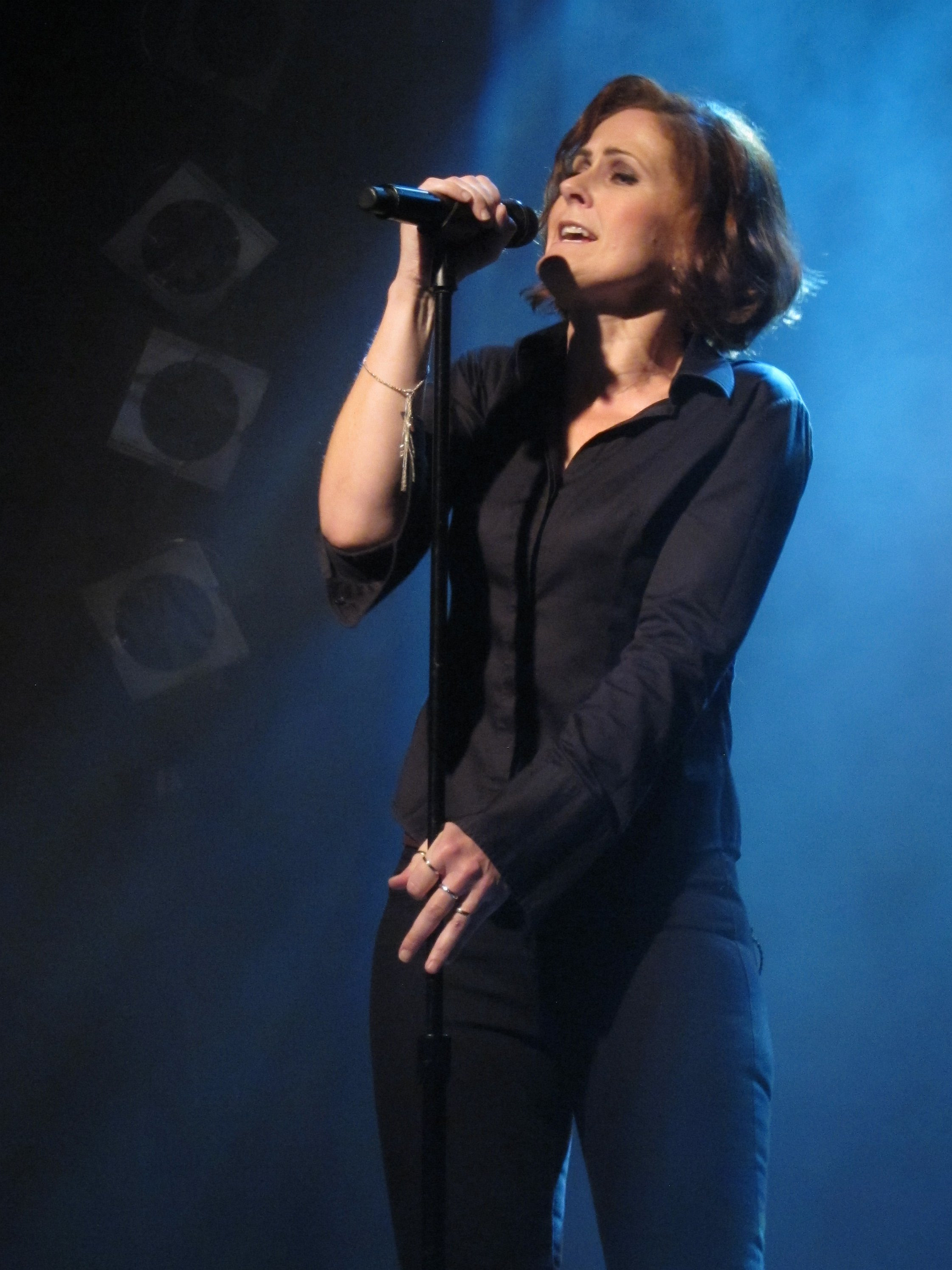
Moyet in 2013

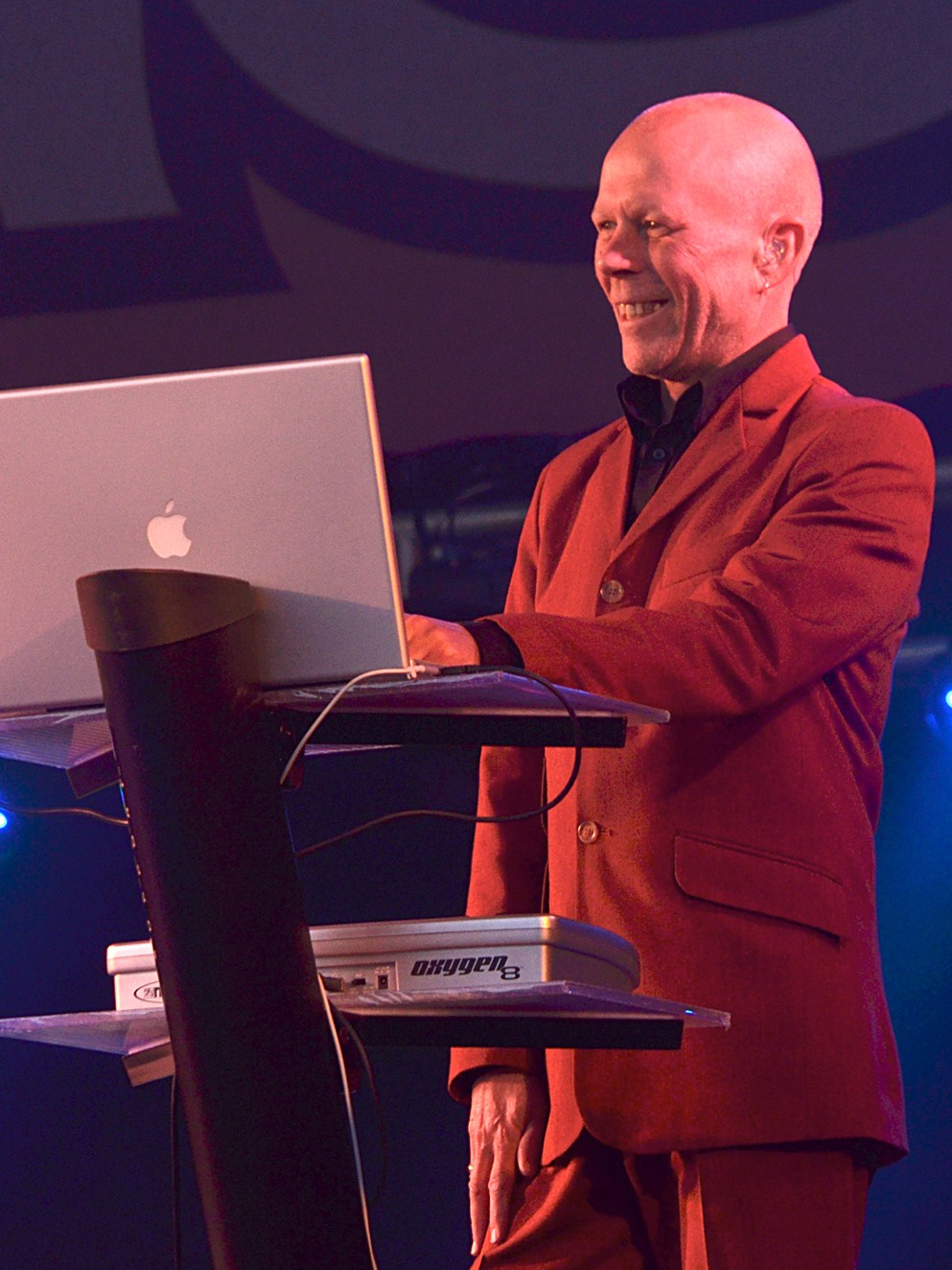
Clarke in 2011

Despite the long estrangement, Moyet had always harboured plans to perform the songs from You and Me Both live on stage, something that had never occurred, as the duo had split before the album was released. Toward the end of 2007, she had finished promoting her album The Turn and had no immediate plans for more solo work, and aware that Mute were planning to issue remastered versions of Yazoo's albums, she e-mailed Clarke to see if he was interested in the idea of a reunion.

Clarke welcomed her message, but replied that he was now committed to his current band Erasure and felt it would be disloyal to his musical partner Andy Bell if he returned to work with Moyet. However, shortly afterwards Bell told Clarke that he wanted to take a break from Erasure, causing Clarke to reconsider Moyet's proposal, and with a message sent via Mute label head Daniel Miller, he indicated that he was open to reuniting for live performances. Clarke disclosed that he had felt obliged to ask Bell if he had any objections to Clarke performing with Yazoo again: Bell's response had simply been to ask Clarke for tickets for the reunion shows.

The first public indication that Yazoo was being revived was on 11 December 2007 when Erasure's website announced that an official Yazoo website and Myspace page were being set up. On 13 December, the Planet Sound music magazine pages on the UK's Teletext service on Channel 4 exclusively revealed that both Yazoo albums were to be reissued and that the duo were planning to reform and play a gig in support of the albums' release.

On 20 January 2008, the new official Yazoo website confirmed that Clarke and Moyet would be reuniting to play five concerts across the UK in June 2008, preceded by a four-disc box set entitled In Your Room, which would feature remastered stereo and 5.1 surround sound mixes of the albums Upstairs at Eric's and You and Me Both, a disc of B-sides and remixes and a DVD including new interviews with Clarke and Moyet and the videos for their five UK and US singles, along with video footage of television performances from 1982 and 1983. Two EPs available on vinyl and as digital downloads were released to coincide with the box set, the Nobody's Diary EP released on 12 May 2008 featuring various remixes of the song (including one by Erasure's Andy Bell) and the Reconnected EP released on 9 June 2008, which featured various Yazoo tracks remixed by different artists.

Having re-established contact, Clarke and Moyet met on 8 April 2008 in a private members' club in London's Covent Garden, with the occasion filmed by the press: it was the first time they had met since a mutual friend's wedding in the early 1990s. The promotion for the tour received moderate television coverage, including a performance on the prime-time BBC chat show Friday Night with Jonathan Ross, broadcast in the UK on 16 May 2008. The tour was rapidly expanded to include concerts in Europe and in the US, as well as extra dates in the UK. The 'Reconnected' tour, as it became known, began in Copenhagen on 26 May 2008, the same day as In Your Room was released. The concert of 10 July 2008 at the Orpheum Theatre in Los Angeles was recorded to be re-aired on Richard Blade's Sirius Radio show. Yazoo wrapped up the final two dates of the US tour by returning to New York City for the first time since October 1982.

In an interview in May 2008 with the online magazine Side-Line, Clarke said that there were plans to record the two London shows on the tour for a possible live album in the future. A double album titled Reconnected Live, featuring tracks recorded on the "Reconnected" tour, was eventually released in September 2010.

On 14 May 2011, Moyet appeared as a guest on stage before Erasure's set on the second day of Mute Records' Short Circuit music festival at the Roundhouse in London. She performed three Yazoo songs with Clarke, "Nobody's Diary", "Ode to Boy" and "Don't Go". In an interview prior to the concert, Moyet said she was "99.9% sure it's the last time" that she and Clarke would perform together as Yazoo, adding, "It was really good that Vince and I had come through the whole circle of being really angry with each other, forgetting what we'd been angry about, and forgetting that there was ever any displeasure."

== Musical style and legacy ==
Matt Mitchell of Paste Magazine called Yazoo "one of the most important and formative synth-pop bands in the sub-genre's history."

== Discography ==
Both of Yazoo's albums received critical acclaim, particularly for the blending of Clarke's synthesizer melodies with Moyet's blues- and soul-influenced vocals.

- Upstairs at Eric's (1982)
- You and Me Both (1983)

== Awards ==
Year	Awards	Category	Work	Result	Ref.
1983	Brit Awards	British Breakthrough Act	Themselves	Won	
1983	Brit Awards	British Group	Themselves	Nominated	
1984	Ivor Novello Awards	The Best Selling A-side	"Only You"	Nominated	

== See also ==
- List of number-one dance hits (United States)
- List of artists who reached number one on the US Dance chart
