= Eric Radcliffe =

- Born: 3 December 1950 (age 75)
- Occupations: Recording engineer; record producer
- Years active: 1968–present

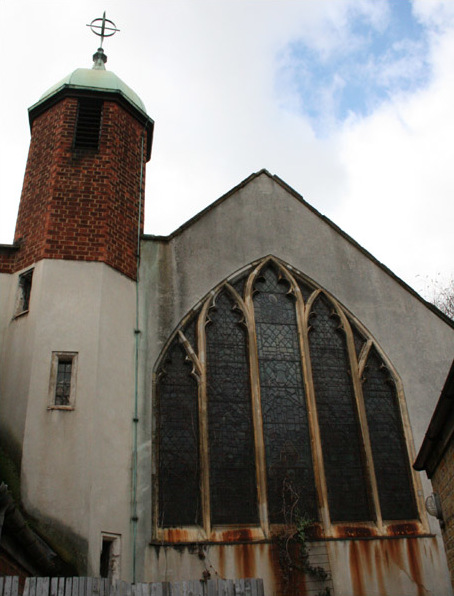
Blackwing Studios

Eric Charles Radcliffe (often credited as E.C. Radcliffe, born 3 December 1950) is an English recording engineer and producer who worked with new wave and synthpop bands in the early 1980s in Basildon, England. He later became owner of Blackwing Studios.

== Background ==
Eric Radcliffe is believed to have had a huge part in the success of Yazoo (Yaz in the USA). In March 1984 Radcliffe gave an interview to Electronics and Music Maker in which he mentioned how he got into the business:

When I was about fifteen the group I was in was booked into a four-track studio to do some demos, and I got a taste for recording then. I got an Akai reel-to-reel at home and I built a studio in the front room, with multi-core cable running into my bedroom which acted as the control room... it snowballed... eventually I was able to afford an eight-track TEAC and it was with that machine that I came up to London and set-up the studio here, which I called Blackwing and it took off in earnest...

And a snippet on his contribution to the Yazoo sound:

We often combine more than one [device] to create a sound. One particular one that sticks in my memory is the snare-drum sound on Yazoo's "Don't Go", I did that using the Lexicon 224 and 224x [reverbs] ganged together. We came across that sound entirely by accident, but then again, in the final analysis I think you discover almost everything by accident, just by fiddling around.

After Yazoo, Radcliffe and Yazoo-songwriter Vince Clarke continued to work together. As the Assembly they released the single "Never Never" with singer Feargal Sharkey in the autumn of 1983. Clarke and Radcliffe also founded the record company Reset Records, and released singles with Robert Marlow, Peter Hewson, Hardware and Absolute, until 1987 when the label shut down.

Eric Radcliffe now lives in Gravesend in Kent, with his three daughters Kai, Fay and Mae. In the documentary video accompanying Yazoo's 25th anniversary release In Your Room, Eric Radcliffe delivers the following message:

I count myself fortunate and privileged to have worked with such a talented team. I remember that we had to build a studio in my house (in about ten days) to complete the recording of Upstairs at Eric's because Blackwing Studios London was fully booked. My mother provided us all with her famous "egg and chips" and also appeared on the record. Wonderful days!

Best regards
Eric Radcliffe

== Notable work ==
- Fad Gadget – Fireside Favourites (1980)
- Fad Gadget – Incontinent (1981)
- Depeche Mode – Speak & Spell (1981)
- Yazoo – Upstairs at Eric's (1982)
- Depeche Mode – A Broken Frame (1982)
- Yazoo – You and Me Both (1983)
- The Assembly – "Never Never" (1983)
- Duet Emmo – "Or So It Seems" (1983)
- Robert Marlow – The Peter Pan Effect (1999)
