= Engineers (Gary Numan album) =

Live album by Gary Numan
- Released: 25 February 2008
- Recorded: Capitol Theatre, Sydney, 31 May 1980
- Genre: New wave, synthpop
- Length: 69:33
- Label: Beggars Banquet Records; BBQCD 2059
- Producer: Gary Numan

Gary Numan chronology
Replicas Redux (2008)	Engineers (2008)	Telekon - Live (2008)

Professional ratings
Review scores
Source	Rating
Record Collector	4/5 stars

Engineers is a limited edition (3000 copies) digipak live album, released by Gary Numan's previous label, Beggars Banquet. The album was recorded at the Capitol Theatre, Sydney, Australia on 31 May 1980.

The album captures the very last concert of "The Touring Principle," Numan's 1979-80 world tour in support of his album The Pleasure Principle (1979). The tour yielded a previous live album, Living Ornaments '79 (1980, expanded edition 1998). As Living Ornaments '79 was drawn from the tour's first leg and Engineers was drawn from the fourth, there are notable differences between the track lists of both albums. While the expanded edition of Living Ornaments '79 contains a live version of one song from Numan's then-forthcoming album Telekon ("Remember I Was Vapour"), Engineers contains three ("Remind Me to Smile," "Remember I Was Vapour", and "I Die: You Die", plus "Trois Gymnopédies", a studio version of which was also recorded by Numan during the Telekon sessions). Unlike Living Ornaments '79, Engineers contains no songs drawn from Numan's 1978 album Tubeway Army.

== Track listing ==
1. "Introduction: Theme From Replicas"
2. "Airlane"
3. "Me! I Disconnect From You"
4. "Praying to the Aliens"
5. "M.E."
6. "Films"
7. "We Are So Fragile"
8. "Are 'Friends' Electric?"
9. "Conversation"
10. "Remind Me to Smile"
11. "Replicas"
12. "Remember I Was Vapour"
13. "Trois Gymnopédies" (Erik Satie)
14. "Cars"
15. "I Die: You Die"
16. "Bombers"
17. "Tracks"
- All songs written by Gary Numan except where noted.

== Personnel ==
- Gary Numan - vocals, guitar, synthesizers
- Paul Gardiner - bass guitar
- Chris Payne - keyboards, viola (left tower)
- Cedric Sharpley - drums
- Rrussell Bell - guitar, keyboards, electronic percussion
- Denis Haines - keyboards (right tower)
