= Random (album) =

Studio album by Various artists, Gary Numan
- Released: 10 June 1997
- Genre: New wave; synthpop; electronic; techno
- Label: Beggars Banquet; BBQCD 195

Various artists, Gary Numan chronology
Human (1995)	Random (1997)	Exile (1997)

Professional ratings
Review scores
Source	Rating
Allmusic	3/5 stars
Entertainment Weekly	B
Uncut	3/5 stars

Random is a double-CD tribute album featuring songs by Gary Numan, released in 1997 on his first label, Beggars Banquet.

Random was released four months before Numan's 1997 studio album Exile. It played a key role in his 1990s career revival, showing the influence he had had on artists such as Damon Albarn, Pop Will Eat Itself, and Jesus Jones. The Guardian wrote in retrospect that his return to form began with Random. Numan himself said it "helped enormously."

The album peaked at number 43 on the UK compilations chart on 21 June 1997. It was followed one year later by the remix album Random (02).

== Track listing ==
1. Saint Etienne - "Stormtrooper in Drag" (7:44)
2. Matt Sharp and Damon Albarn - "We Have a Technical" (3:20)
3. Gravity Kills - "Poetry and Power" (3:18)
4. Peck Slip - "I Can't Stop" (4:02)
5. An Pierlé - "Are 'Friends' Electric?" (4:06)
6. EMF - "We Are Glass" (4:05)
7. The Magnetic Fields - "I Die: You Die" (3:10)
8. Jesus Jones - "We Are So Fragile" (3:44)
9. Posh - "She's Got Claws" (3:16)
10. Earl Brutus - "M.E." (3:55)
11. Underdog - "Films" (7:05)
12. Sukia - "Me! I Disconnect From You" (3:00)
13. The Orb - "Jo The Waiter" (Bon Appétit Remix) (9:46)
14. Kenickie - "I'm an Agent" (4:16)
15. Jimi Tenor - "Down in the Park" (6:30)
16. Moloko - "Are 'Friends' Electric?" (6:27)
17. Chris Holmes - "Remember I Was Vapour" (3:15)
18. Towering Inferno - "Metal" (5:05)
19. Dubstar - "Everyday I Die" (3:41)
20. Amanda Ghost - "Absolution" (3:50)
21. Deadsy - "Replicas" (5:12)
22. Pop Will Eat Itself - "Friends" (3:55)
23. Republica - "Are 'Friends' Electric?" (5:37)
24. Windscale - "War Songs" (3:41)
25. Bis - "We Are So Fragile" (2:58)
26. Dave Clarke - "Cars" (5:14)
