= Living Ornaments '79 =

Live album by Gary Numan
- Released: 24 April 1981
- Recorded: 28 September 1979
- Venue: Hammersmith Odeon, London
- Genre: New wave, synthpop
- Length: 71:10
- Label: Beggars Banquet Records
- Producer: Gary Numan

Gary Numan chronology
Telekon (1980)	Living Ornaments '79 (1981)	Living Ornaments '80 (1981)

Professional ratings
Review scores
Source	Rating
AllMusic	4/5 stars
Release Magazine	5/10 stars

Living Ornaments '79 (1981) is a live album by British musician Gary Numan, released in 1981 by Beggars Banquet Records. The album was recorded at the Hammersmith Odeon on 28 September 1979. In 1981, it was re-released as a limited edition box set with Living Ornaments '80. An expanded 21-track version was reissued on a double CD in 1998 before a remastered version was again reissued in 2005. The nine tracks of the original Living Ornaments '79 were included on 1979: The Live EPs, a disc available to those who bought the expanded, 2-disc version of The Pleasure Principle from Numan's website in 2009.

Living Ornaments '79 is one of two official live albums from Numan's 1979-1980 tour (billed as "The Touring Principle"), and is a record of the tour's first leg. In 2008, Numan's record label released Engineers, recorded during the tour's final leg (May 1980).

== The Touring Principle video ==
In 1980, an edited version of the 28 September 1979 concert was released on video under the title The Touring Principle '79 and "special video effects" of the time were added to the recording. The songs featured on the video were "Me! I Disconnect From You", "M.E.", "We Are So Fragile", "Everyday I Die", "Conversation", "Remember I Was Vapour", "On Broadway", "Down in the Park", "My Shadow in Vain", "Are 'Friends' Electric?", and "Tracks". The concert itself was preceded on the original cassette by the promo video for "Cars". In 2009, The Touring Principle '79 was released on DVD with the same track listing and with the video effects removed (although the original video version with the effects is included as a bonus feature). The DVD does not feature the "Cars" video, although it does include a 34-minute interview with Numan in 2009, recalling his memories of the original 1979 tour.

== Track listing ==
All songs written by Gary Numan, except where noted.

=== Original LP ===
Side one

1. "Airlane" – 3:12
2. "Cars" – 3:20
3. "We Are So Fragile" – 2:33
4. "Films" – 3:45
5. "Something's in the House" – 4:08

Side two

1. "My Shadow in Vain" – 2:50
2. "Conversation" – 7:45
3. "The Dream Police" – 4:12
4. "Metal" – 3:25

=== 1998 CD reissue ===
Disc one

1. "Intro" – 2:32
2. "Airlane" – 3:07
3. "Me! I Disconnect From You" – 3:02
4. "Cars" – 3:25
5. "M.E." – 4:42
6. "You Are in My Vision" – 3:11
7. "Somethings in the House" – 3:55
8. "Random" – 3:38
9. "Everyday I Die" – 3:36
10. "Conversation" – 7:51
11. "We Are So Fragile" – 2:46

Disc two

1. "Bombers" – 5:30
2. "Remember I Was Vapour" – 4:51
3. "On Broadway" (Barry Mann, Cynthia Weil, Jerry Leiber, Mike Stoller) – 4:38
4. "The Dream Police" – 4:19
5. "Films" – 3:49
6. "Metal" – 3:25
7. "Down in the Park" – 5:38
8. "My Shadow in Vain" – 2:34
9. "Are 'Friends' Electric?" – 5:33
10. "Tracks" – 3:10

== Personnel ==
Credits adapted from Living Ornaments '79 and '80 box set.

Musicians

- Gary Numan – vocals
- Paul Gardiner – bass
- Chris Payne – keyboards, viola
- Ced Sharpley – drums
- Billy Currie – keyboards, violin
- Rrussell Bell – guitar

Technical

- Gary Numan – producer, mixing
- Tim Summerhayes – engineer, mixing
- Phil Thornalley – assistant engineer
- Will Gosling – mixing assistant
- Peter Gilbert – photographer
- Robert Ellis – photographer

== Charts ==
- Original album No. 47 (UK Albums Chart)
- Living Ornaments '79 and '80 box set No. 2 (UK Albums Chart)
