= Rikki and the Last Days of Earth =

British punk group

Background information
- Also known as: Rikki And The Last Days on Earth (early), Rikki And The Last Days
- Origin: England
- Genres: Punk rock, new wave, synthpop, post-punk
- Years active: 1976–c. 1978
- Label: DJM
- Past members: Rikki Sylvan; Valac Van Der Veene; Andy Prince; Nik Weiss; Hugh Inge-Innes Lillingston

Rikki and the Last Days of Earth (formerly Rikki and the Last Days on Earth) were an early British punk group. They were chronicled in Henrik Poulsen's book 77: The Year of Punk and New Wave. Billboard credited them with paving the way for 1980s new romantic acts.

== History ==
The band was formed in November 1976 by vocalist Rikki Sylvan (whose real name was Nicholas Condron) and guitarist Valac Van Der Veene, joined shortly afterwards by keyboardist Nik Weiss, bassist Andy Prince (also called Andy Prinz) and drummer Nigel Bartle. In May 1977, Bartle was replaced by Hugh Inge-Innes Lillingston. The band were managed by Frank Case.

Although the band seemed to be working class (a stereotypical characteristic for punk musicians), they had a middle-class (or even upper-class) upbringing. Sylvan lived in Kensington and went to public school, Prince lived with his parents in Addlestone and Weiss went to public school. The son of a lieutenant commander, Inge-Innes Lillingstone lived in Thorpe Hall, near Tamworth, and attended Eton School.

The band's official live concert debut was at The Man in the Moon in Chelsea on 28 May 1977.

A single called Oundle RocSoc, containing early versions of "City of the Damned" and "Dorian Gray") was recorded at Tin Pan Alley Studio and released in May 1977. In the late summer of 1977, the band signed with DJM Records, and a new, re-recorded version of "City of the Damned" was released as a single in November.

In January 1978, the band released the single "Loaded", backed with a cover of the Rolling Stones' song "Street Fighting Man"). That May, "Twilight Jack" was recorded as an acetate but never released commercially. Shortly afterwards, they released their excellent 4 Minute Warning album, which according to one critic was "roundly ignored". While the band were recording a second album at the CBS studio in London, they were dropped by DJM and split up shortly afterward. Their records generally received bad reviews in the British press.

Later, Sylvan mixed Gary Numan's albums Replicas (with Numan's previous band Tubeway Army) and The Pleasure Principle. He also released a solo album, The Silent Hours, and then formed a band called 3AM with Steve Wilkin (guitar) and Derek Quinton (drums), both ex-members of Neo. Van Der Veene became a journalist, interviewing new wave icons. Prince joined Random Hold, but also worked with his ex-bandmate Sylvan in the 1980s.

== Legacy ==
According to AllMusic: "When the history of the new wave finally started to get written, Rikki and the Last Days of Earth were conspicuous by their absence. No one remembered; nobody cared. Yet without them, a lot of what is now taken for granted about the early '80s might never have occurred".

== Discography ==
=== Studio albums ===
- 4 Minute Warning (May 1978, DJM Records)

=== Singles ===
- Oundle RocSoc (May 1977, self-released) (One Sided, No Picture Sleeve)
- "City of the Damned" (November 1977, (DJM Records) With Picture Sleeve
- "Loaded" (January 1978, (DJM Records) With Picture Sleeve
- "Twilight Jack" (May 1978, DJM Records) (Acetate Only, NO General Release)
- "Tokyo" (September 1978, DJM Records) Credited to Rikki Sylvan & The Last Days (Picture Sleeve)
