= Jo the Waiter =

1979 single by Tubeway Army

Song by Tubeway Army

from the album Tubeway Army
- Released: 24 November 1978
- Recorded: July–August 1978
- Studio: Spaceward (Cambridge)
- Genre: Post-punk
- Length: 2:40
- Label: Beggars Banquet
- Songwriter: Gary Numan
- Producer: Gary Numan

"Jo the Waiter" is a song by the English musician Gary Numan, originally released by his new wave band Tubeway Army on their eponymous debut studio album in 1978. The song is often cited by critics and fans as one of the high points of the album, and Numan has taken to performing it live in concert over the last decade or so (perhaps at the behest of his wife Gemma, who considers it her favourite song).

The subject matter concerns a lonely man who recalls an unsuccessful homosexual affair that he had with a waiter whom he used to employ. He licks his psychological wounds from the affair's fallout while junkies and valium addicts surround him. The phrase "Young men need love special" is a quote from William S. Burroughs' novel Naked Lunch (1959). According to biographer Steve Malins, Numan took the real-life loss of a girlfriend, Joanna Casey, as the starting point for the song, reversed the sexuality of the affair and then embroidered the tale to arrive at the final lyric. Like many Numan songs from this period, it evokes a Burroughsian world of addiction, homosexuality and failed relationships, predating the writer's fascination with science fiction that took hold on the subsequent and final Tubeway Army studio album, Replicas (1979).

"Jo the Waiter" is one of Numan's few acoustic guitar tracks, others being "The Monday Troop" and "Crime of Passion" (also written and recorded in 1978 but unreleased until 1993 as part of the CD release of the compilation album The Plan).
