= Dark Light (Gary Numan album) =

Live album by Gary Numan
- Released: June 1995
- Recorded: Labatt's Hammersmith Apollo, London on 12 November 1994
- Genre: Industrial rock
- Label: Numa, Cleopatra, Eagle
- Producer: Gary Numan

Gary Numan chronology
Sacrifice (1994)	Dark Light (1995)	Human (1995)

Alternative cover
- The cover from the remastered 2003 album

Professional ratings
Review scores
Source	Rating
AllMusic	3/5 stars

Dark Light is a live album by the English musician Gary Numan. The album was released in June 1995 in the United Kingdom. The album was not released in the United States until August 1998. In April 2003 the album was remastered and reissued. The album was recorded at Numan's concert at Labatt's Hammersmith Apollo in London on 12 November 1994 during his Sacrifice Tour. The album reached number 107 on the UK Albums Chart.

== Track listing ==
All tracks written by Gary Numan except where noted.

All timings are approximate and will vary slightly with different equipment.

=== 1995 Numa CD release (NUMACD 1012) ===
CD One

1. "Pray (Intro)" – 2:18
2. "A Question of Faith" – 4:58
3. "I Dream of Wires" – 5:04
4. "Noise Noise" – 4:11
5. "Listen to the Sirens" – 3:11
6. "Everyday I Die" – 4:27
7. "Desire" – 4:12
8. "Friends" – 3:29
9. "Scar" – 3:31
10. "Magic" – 4:57
11. "Praying to the Aliens" – 3:39
12. "Replicas" – 5:22
13. "Mean Street" – 3:43

CD Two

1. "Stormtrooper in Drag" (Paul Gardiner, Numan) – 4:53
2. "Deadliner" – 4:48
3. "Bleed" – 6:03
4. "The Dream Police" – 4:45
5. "I Die: You Die" – 3:37
6. "The Hunter" – 5:33
7. "Remind Me to Smile" – 3:59
8. "Are 'Friends' Electric?" – 6:11
9. "Do You Need the Service?" – 3:00
10. "Love and Napalm" – 5:28
11. "Jo the Waiter" – 3:21
12. "I'm An Agent" – 5:02

=== 1998 Cleopatra U.S. CD reissue (CLP 0334-2) ===
Same CD track listing as Numa release. Different front, rear and inner tray artwork.

=== 2003 Eagle Records CD reissue (EDMCD 161) ===
Same CD track listing as Numa release. Different front, rear and inner tray artwork and an essay by Dominic Jones.

== Personnel ==
- Gary Numan – vocals, guitar, producer, mixing
- John Webb – keyboards
- Ade Orange – keyboards, bass, vocals
- Kipper – guitar, vocals
- Richard Beasley – drums
- Scott Simon – photography
- Brett Wallace – photography
- Ivan Gadsby – photography
