= Cedric Sharpley =

- Born: Cedric Larry Sharpley; 2 July 1952; Cape Town, South Africa
- Died: 13 March 2012 (aged 59) Aylesbury, Buckinghamshire, England
- Genres: Synth-pop; new wave; progressive rock
- Occupation: Musician
- Instrument: Drums
- Formerly of: Druid; Tubeway Army; Gary Numan; Visage; Dramatis; Frame by Frame; Tinderfish

Cedric Larry Sharpley (2 July 1952 – 13 March 2012) was a South African-born musician who was the drummer with several bands in the 1970s and 1980s, including Gary Numan, Tubeway Army, Druid and Dramatis. With Numan, Sharpley played on five studio albums including the UK number ones The Pleasure Principle and Telekon.

== Career ==
=== Druid ===
Sharpley was born in Cape Town in 1952, and moved with his family to Hertfordshire, England, in the 1960s. In the early 1970s, he co-founded the progressive rock band Druid with Neil Brewer, Andrew McCrorie-Shand and Dane Stevens, releasing two albums with them and performing on The Old Grey Whistle Test in 1975. Druid split in 1977, and Sharpley went on to join Gary Numan's band Tubeway Army in the spring of 1979, replacing Numan's uncle Jess Lidyard on drums.

=== Tubeway Army and Gary Numan ===
Sharpley's arrival in Tubeway Army coincided with the track "Are "Friends" Electric?" progressing up the UK charts to number one at the end of June 1979. He performed the song with the band on Top of the Pops and The Old Grey Whistle Test along with "Down in the Park". A session recorded for John Peel, also in June, was credited solely to Gary Numan, and the Tubeway Army name was subsequently dropped, although Sharpley, bass guitarist Paul Gardiner and keyboard players Billy Currie and Chris Payne remained with Numan as his backing band.

Numan's first album under his own name, The Pleasure Principle, reached number one in the UK charts, as did the lead single, "Cars". The song also reached the top of the charts in Canada, and is Numan's most successful single. The follow-up single, "Complex", reached number six in the UK in November.

In 1980, Sharpley appeared on Numan's second album, Telekon, which also reached number one in the UK, and which included the hit singles "We Are Glass", "I Die: You Die" and "This Wreckage". The following year, Numan temporarily retired from touring, although he released his third album, Dance, in September, which also featured Sharpley. Dance reached number three in the UK, and the single "She's Got Claws" reached number six in September 1981.

While with Numan, Sharpley worked with Currie and Payne on the track "Fade to Grey", which was initially considered to be released as a Currie and Payne single, but which eventually became part of the Visage project with Midge Ure and Steve Strange. The song reached number eight in the UK singles chart.

=== Dramatis and later career ===
After Numan's temporary retirement from touring in 1981, Sharpley, Payne, guitarist Rrussell Bell and keyboard player Denis Haines formed the synth-pop band Dramatis. They released the album For Future Reference that year, although it failed to chart. The second single from the album, "Love Needs No Disguise", featured Numan on vocals and reached number 33 in the UK charts, and a later single, "I Can See Her Now", reached number 57.

Sharpley later returned to work with Numan again on the albums Warriors and Berserker, and rejoined his live band when touring resumed. His later career included rejoining his Druid bandmate Neil Brewer in the bands Frame by Frame and Tinderfish.

Dramatis had intended to reform in 2012, but this was put on hold after Sharpley's death that year. A single, "A Torment of Angels", was finally released in 2020, and Bell stated in an interview, "To be honest, losing Ced was a massive blow that seriously knocked us back. Even now, whenever I program a drum track, I always try to imagine what Ced might have played and attempt that."

== Death ==
Sharpley died of a heart attack in 2012. Numan wrote on his website, "Ced was not only a truly great drummer but a gentle, fascinating and funny man to be around and he will be greatly missed." Numan later said in an interview that he and Sharpley had never fallen out. "It was really sad he died but I was sadder when I realised I hadn't spoken to him for well over 20 years. That really bothered me... I regret I lost touch with him so badly."

== Discography ==
=== With Druid ===
- Toward the Sun (1975)
- Fluid Druid (1976)

=== With Gary Numan ===
- The Pleasure Principle (1979 – UK No. 1)
- Telekon (1980 – UK No. 1)
- Dance (1981 – UK No. 3)
- Warriors (1983 – UK No. 12)
- Berserker (1984 – UK No. 45)

=== With Dramatis ===
- For Future Reference (1981)

=== With Tinderfish ===
- Tinderfish (2008)

=== Other appearances ===
- Visage – Visage (1980 – UK No. 13)
- Catherine Andrews – Fruits (1982)
- Big Noise U.K. – Good Morning Baby (1991)
