= The Pleasure Principle (album) =

Studio album by Gary Numan
- Released: 7 September 1979
- Recorded: Mid–1979
- Studios: Marcus Music AB (London, England)
- Genres: Synth-pop; electropop; new wave; electronica; post-punk
- Length: 41:07
- Label: Beggars Banquet
- Producer: Gary Numan

Gary Numan chronology
Replicas (1979)	The Pleasure Principle (1979)	Telekon (1980)

Singles from The Pleasure Principle
- 1. "Cars" Released: 24 August 1979; 2. "Complex" Released: 16 November 1979

Alternative cover
- The Pleasure Principle: The First Recordings cover

The Pleasure Principle is the debut solo studio album by the English new wave musician Gary Numan, released on 7 September 1979 by Beggars Banquet Records. The album came about six months after Replicas (1979), his second and final studio album with the band Tubeway Army. The Pleasure Principle peaked at No. 1 on the UK Albums Chart.

The album features his biggest hit, "Cars".

== Recording ==
Following Replicas, Numan recruited a permanent drummer and a keyboard player and demoed an album's worth of new material in April 1979. This was before the single "Are "Friends" Electric?" from the previous album had been released. A second session that yielded four further songs followed some weeks later. The day after "Are "Friends" Electric?" reached number one on the UK Singles Chart, Numan and his band recorded four of the new songs in a session for John Peel, credited to Gary Numan and dropping the group name Tubeway Army. By the time Replicas reached number one on the albums chart The Pleasure Principle was being recorded at Marcus Music Studio, London.

== Composition and release ==
The Pleasure Principle has been described as featuring synth-pop, electropop, new wave, and electronica throughout. Numan completely abandoned electric guitar on the album. This change, coupled with frequent use of synthetic percussion, produced the most purely electronic and robotic sound of his career. In addition to the Minimoog synthesizer employed on his previous album, Numan made liberal use of the Polymoog keyboard, particularly its distinctive "Vox Humana" preset. Other production tricks included copious amounts of flanging, phasing and reverb, plus the unusual move of including solo viola and violin parts in the arrangements.

Lyrically, the album continued the science fiction-themes of the previous album. While not a theme album the way Replicas was, Numan has described the songs as "more of a collection of thoughts I'd had about the way technology was evolving and where it would take us."

Notable tracks included "Airlane", the lead-off instrumental; "Metal", sung from the perspective of an android longing to be human; "M.E.", standing for "Mechanical Engineering" and told from the perspective of the last machine on Earth, the electronic ballad "Complex", a UK No. 6 single; and "Cars", a worldwide synth-pop hit which reached No. 9 in the U.S. and No. 1 in Canada, helping make The Pleasure Principle Numan's strongest North American showing, but lack of a strong commercial follow-up resulted in him being tagged as a one-hit wonder there.

"Complex", featuring an arrangement including piano, violin (played by Ultravox's Billy Currie) and viola, was chosen as the second single from the album, released in November 1979. Despite its commercial success, peaking at No. 6 in the UK during a nine-week chart run, Numan later regretted the choice of it as a single and that "Metal" should have been released instead.

== Title and cover image ==
The title of the album was taken from the surrealist painting The Pleasure Principle by René Magritte. Subtitled (A portrait of Edward James), it depicts a seated figure whose arms rest on a wooden table upon which lies a small stone, and a ball of light obliterating the figure's head. The cover image of Numan's album is an adaptation of the painting with Numan seated in the same position dressed in a similar suit, but replacing the natural materials (wood and stone) with shiny and glowing artificial objects and futuristic shapes. According to Numan it was "a clear nod towards technology. Where Magritte had a rock on a desk, for example, I had a glowing purple Perspex pyramid."

== Tour ==
Numan toured throughout the world in support of the album with a huge stage set including banks of neon lights and twin pyramids which moved across the stage via radio control. The live show was captured on record as Living Ornaments '79 (1981) and on video as The Touring Principle. The support act on the UK leg of the tour was Orchestral Manoeuvres in the Dark. An expanded version of Living Ornaments '79 was issued on CD in 2005, and the final show of The Touring Principle was captured on the CD Engineers (released exclusively through Numan's official website) in 2008.

Numan performed a 16-date mini-tour dedicated to the album across the UK and Ireland during November and December 2009, similar to his previous tours for Replicas (1979) and Telekon (1980), performing the album in its entirety. Numan had been scheduled to play the 2010 Coachella Festival in Indio, California but was forced to cancel, due to the Icelandic volcano eruption that disrupted air travel. To make up for this, he embarked upon another 16-date mini-tour of the U.S. that August, again performing The Pleasure Principle in its entirety.

== Reissue ==
Of the bonus tracks later included on CD reissues, "Random" and "Oceans" were instrumental outtakes from The Pleasure Principle sessions, originally issued on vinyl with other previously unreleased tracks in 1985, while "Asylum" was the instrumental B-side of the "Cars" vinyl single. The live versions of "Me! I Disconnect From You" and "Bombers", which appeared as B-sides of "Complex", were recorded on tour and later made available in their original context on the expanded Living Ornaments '79 CD, along with "Remember I Was Vapour" and "On Broadway". The latter two tracks were first released as a promotional single shipped with early pressings of the album Telekon in 1980; Numan's cover version of the classic "On Broadway" was dominated by a characteristic synthesizer solo by then-former (and soon-to-be-again) Ultravox band member Billy Currie.

== Critical reception ==
Professional ratings
Review scores
Source	Rating
AllMusic	4.5/5 stars
Classic Rock	9/10
Mojo	5/5 stars
Pitchfork	8.2/10
Q	4/5 stars
Record Collector	4/5 stars
Smash Hits	7/10
Spin	8/10
Uncut	9/10
The Village Voice	B

Robert Christgau of The Village Voice described The Pleasure Principle as "Metal Machine Music goes easy-listening," continuing: "This time he's singing about robots, engineers, and isolation. In such a slight artist, these things make all the difference."

Smash Hits reviewer Red Starr found the album to be "not bad, mind you — a smoother, almost discoish version of Replicas — but much too similar to it and not as adventurous".

Record Mirror's Simon Ludgate also found that Numan repeated the formula from Replicas and criticized the songs for being too cold and detached: "Detachment and distance are painstakingly sewn into every track (...) Numan's affected android voice and his lumbering synthesizers infiltrate your mind, leaving you numbed and clogged."

In a retrospective review, AllMusic's Greg Prato said The Pleasure Principle was distinguished by the consistent quality of its songs and the presence of drummer Cedric Sharpley, who "adds a whole new dimension with his powerful percussion work." Prato concluded, "If you had to own just one Gary Numan album, The Pleasure Principle would be it."

== Track listing ==
All tracks are written by Gary Numan, except where noted.

Side one
No.	Title	Length
1.	"Airlane"	3:18
2.	"Metal"	3:32
3.	"Complex"	3:12
4.	"Films"	4:09
5.	"M.E."	5:37

Side two
No.	Title	Length
6.	"Tracks"	2:51
7.	"Observer"	2:53
8.	"Conversation"	7:36
9.	"Cars"	3:58
10.	"Engineers"	4:01

1998 CD bonus tracks
No.	Title	Writer(s)	Length
11.	"Random"		3:49
12.	"Oceans"		3:03
13.	"Asylum"		2:31
14.	"Me! I Disconnect From You" (Live)		3:06
15.	"Bombers" (Live)		5:46
16.	"Remember I Was Vapour" (Live)		4:46
17.	"On Broadway" (Live)	Jerry Leiber, Mike Stoller, Barry Mann, Cynthia Weil	4:48

=== 30th Anniversary Edition ===
To coincide with The Pleasure Principle 30th Anniversary Tour, a special edition of the album was released on 21 September 2009. Featuring the original album and a second disc of demos, studio sessions, and live recordings. A triple disc edition of the reissue was also available through Townsend Records and Numan's website.

2009 Reissue bonus disc
No.	Title	Length
1.	"Airlane" (Demo)	3:17
2.	"Metal" (Demo)	3:35
3.	"Complex" (Demo)	3:16
4.	"Films" (Demo)	2:41
5.	"M.E." (Demo)	4:31
6.	"Tracks" (Outtake)	2:51
7.	"Observer" (Demo)	3:02
8.	"Conversation" (Demo 2)	6:49
9.	"Cars" (Demo 2)	3:14
10.	"Engineers" (Demo)	3:51
11.	"Random"	3:58
12.	"Oceans"	3:03
13.	"Asylum"	2:31
14.	"Photograph"	2:26
15.	"Trois Gymnopédies No. 1" (Demo)	2:25
16.	"Conversation" (Demo 1)	3:55
17.	"M.E." (Outtake)	5:15

2009 Reissue Townsend Records exclusive disc
No.	Title	Writer(s)	Original release	Length
1.	"Down In The Park" (Live; first recording)			4:32
2.	"On Broadway" (Live)	Leiber, Stoller, Mann, Weil		4:44
3.	"Everyday I Die" (Live)			3:40
4.	"Remember I Was Vapour" (Live)			4:43
5.	"Bombers" (Live)		"Complex" 12" single	5:33
6.	"Me! I Disconnect From You" (Live)		"Complex" single	3:06
7.	"Conversation" (Live; first recording)			7:47
8.	"Metal" (Live; first recording)			3:27
9.	"Down In The Park" (Live; second recording)			5:14
10.	"Airlane" (Live)		Living Ornaments '79	3:16
11.	"Cars" (Live)		Living Ornaments '79	3:26
12.	"We Are So Fragile" (Live)		Living Ornaments '79	2:39
13.	"Films" (Live)		Living Ornaments '79	3:51
14.	"Something's In The House" (Live)		Living Ornaments '79	4:12
15.	"My Shadow In Vain" (Live)		Living Ornaments '79	2:54
16.	"Conversation" (Live; second recording)		Living Ornaments '79	7:44
17.	"The Dream Police" (Live)		Living Ornaments '79	4:18
18.	"Metal" (Live; second recording)		Living Ornaments '79	4:02

=== 40th Anniversary Edition ===
To celebrate the 40th Anniversary of the release of The Pleasure Principle, a special edition of the album, The Pleasure Principle: The First Recordings was released on 11 October 2019. Released on 2 LP coloured vinyl and 2 CD editions.

The Pleasure Principle: The First Recordings disc 1
No.	Title	Length
1.	"Cars" (Demo 2)	3:14
2.	"Films" (Demo)	2:41
3.	"Complex" (Demo)	3:16
4.	"Random"	3:58
5.	"M.E." (Demo)	4:31
6.	"Conversation" (Demo 2)	6:49
7.	"Tracks" (Demo)	3:01
8.	"Cars" (Demo 1)	3:36
9.	"Metal" (Demo)	3:35
10.	"Airlane" (Demo)	3:17
11.	"Trois Gymnopédies No. 1" (Demo)	2:25
12.	"Observer" (Demo)	3:02
13.	"Conversation" (Demo 1)	3:55
14.	"Engineers" (Demo)	3:51
15.	"Asylum"	2:31
16.	"Oceans"	3:01
17.	"Photograph"	2:26

The Pleasure Principle: The First Recordings disc 2
No.	Title	Length
1.	"Airlane" (Peel Session)	3:24
2.	"Cars" (Peel Sessions)	3:15
3.	"Films" (Peel Session)	2:50
4.	"Conversation" (Peel Session)	6:49
5.	"Tracks" (Outtake)	2:51
6.	"Complex" (Outtake)	3:14
7.	"M.E." (Outtake)	5:16
8.	"Engineers" (Outtake)	3:44
9.	"Airlane" (Outtake)	3:17
10.	"Cars" (Outtake)	3:45

== Personnel ==
Credits are adapted from The Pleasure Principle liner notes.

- Gary Numan – vocals; synthesizers (Minimoog, Polymoog, ARP Odyssey); synthetic percussion (Synare 3)
- Paul Gardiner – bass
- Chris Payne – keyboards (Minimoog, Polymoog, piano); viola
- Cedric Sharpley – drums, percussion
- Billy Currie – fadeout violin on "Tracks" and "Conversation"
- Garry Robson – backing vocals on "Conversation"

== Charts ==
=== Weekly charts ===
Weekly chart performance for The Pleasure Principle
Chart (1979–1980)	Peak position
Australian Albums (Kent Music Report)	24
Canada Top Albums/CDs (RPM)	11
Japanese Albums (Oricon)	64
New Zealand Albums (RMNZ)	19
UK Albums (Official Charts)	1
US Billboard 200	16

Weekly chart performance for The Pleasure Principle (30th Anniversary Edition)
Chart (2009)	Peak position
UK Albums (Official Charts)	98

Weekly chart performance for The Pleasure Principle: The First Recordings
Chart (2019)	Peak position
UK Albums (Official Charts)	36

=== Year-end charts ===
1979 year-end chart performance for The Pleasure Principle
Chart (1979)	Position
UK Albums (OCC)	34

1980 year-end chart performance for The Pleasure Principle
Chart (1980)	Position
Australian Albums (Kent Music Report)	97
Canada Top Albums/CDs (RPM)	49
US Billboard 200	50

== Certifications ==
Region	Certification	Certified units/sales
Australia (ARIA)	Gold	20,000^{^}
Canada (Music Canada)	Gold	50,000^{^}
United Kingdom (BPI)	Gold	100,000^{^}
^{^} Shipments figures based on certification alone.

== Legacy ==
"Metal" was covered by Nine Inch Nails on Things Falling Apart (2000), Thought Industry on Recruited to Do Good Deeds for the Devil (1998) and Afrika Bambaataa on Dark Matter Moving at the Speed of Light (2004).

"M.E." was used as backing for Basement Jaxx's "Where's Your Head At".
