= Berserker (Gary Numan album) =

Studio album by Gary Numan
- Released: 9 November 1984
- Recorded: 1984
- Studio: Rock City Studios (Shepperton)
- Genres: Electronic rock; industrial rock; new wave; funk rock; synth-pop; hard rock
- Length: 45:36
- Label: Numa
- Producer: Gary Numan

Gary Numan chronology
The Plan (1984)	Berserker (1984)	The Fury (1985)

Singles from Berserker
- 1. "Berserker" Released: 26 October 1984; 2. "My Dying Machine" Released: 7 December 1984

Professional ratings
Review scores
Source	Rating
AllMusic	2/5 stars
Smash Hits	3/10

Berserker is the sixth solo studio album by the English new wave musician Gary Numan, released on 9 November 1984, it was his first album to be released under Numan's own record label, Numa Records.

== Overview ==
Gary Numan's recording contract with his previous record label Beggars Banquet had ended with the release of 1983's studio album, Warriors. Disillusioned with record companies, Numan decided to create his own record label, Numa Records, to give himself full control over his recordings, production and marketing. Numan was now free to take his music into a harder direction without interference.

Berserker presented a harder synth, hi-NRG-inspired rock sound than Numan's previous studio albums, with an abundant use of sampling and the distinctive sound of the PPG Wave synthesiser. It developed on the electro-funk sound of Warriors, marking a change from the prominent fretless bass on his previous three studio albums but retaining the female backing vocals and occasional saxophone.

Lyrically, the album has a haunting, dystopian theme:

The Berserker album doesn't have a central character or a story as such. I was writing about being something, or part of something, fictional. Something that was dreadful, powerful, unstoppable. Something almost alien from what you're used to which is coming your way. I was trying to create a feeling of only half-guessed-at menace. The songs had bits which were specific to me but they were mostly weird fictional stuff about being cold, playing games with people, using people in very unpleasant ways, without ever saying what they were, exactly.

The poignant track "A Child with the Ghost" was Numan's tribute to his friend and former bassist Paul Gardiner, who died in February 1984 from a heroin overdose. The track was also covered by the duo Tik and Tok on their studio album Intolerance (which featured Numan) the same year. The industrial undertones of the Berserker album would be more fully explored on Numan's next studio album, The Fury (1985).

Numan appeared on the cover (and throughout the subsequent tour) as a white-skinned, white-clad "Iceman" with blue makeup and hair. The album was named after a series of science-fiction novels by Fred Saberhagen, which Numan had read at school.

The title track was released as a single in October 1984, but only made it to No. 32 on the UK Singles Chart; his lowest-charting single at that time, alongside "Sister Surprise" from the preceding studio album Warriors. The album was released one month later, but only managed No. 45 on the UK Albums Chart, making it Numan's first studio album to miss the UK top 30. In chart terms, Berserker was outperformed by The Plan, an archival compilation album of early Numan material released by his former record label Beggars Banquet in September 1984 that reached No. 29. "My Dying Machine" was released as the second and final single off Berserker in December of the same year and peaked at No. 66.

The album was originally released in two different-length versions in the UK. The CD and cassette releases featured longer versions of all tracks, while the LP features shorter mixes. The remastered version titled Berserker (Extended) [2025 Remaster] was released on 7 March 2025 digitally, as 4CD deluxe and 2LP vinyl.

== Critical reception ==
Upon its release, the album received poor reviews in the British music press. Writing for Smash Hits, Vici Macdonald found that it "starts well enough", but "After 9 almost identical tracks, it's a relief when the album ends." In a retrospective review, Ned Raggett of AllMusic noted the contrast between Numan's "one-of-a-kind voice -- often capturing a sense of melancholic passion better than ever" and the "all-too-obvious arrangements from the mid-'80s", describing Numan as "seeming like a guest on his own record".

== The Berserker Tour ==
Numan's 19-date UK Berserker Tour of November–December 1984 featured a stylized "high-tech Roman temple" stage set to complement Numan's white leather jacket/white make-up/blue-hair look. The tour spawned a double-album, White Noise (1985), recorded live at the Hammersmith Odeon in December 1984. The same concert was captured (albeit in edited form) on the video The Berserker Tour; both the album and the video were released in 1985. In early 2008, the video of the entire concert was released for the first time, on the DVD Cold Warning. The DVD contains, as an extra feature, a 2007 interview in which Numan discusses his recollections of the Berserker album and tour. Numan mentions that Berserker was influenced by Trevor Horn's production work with Frankie Goes to Hollywood, and claims that distribution problems and a lack of media airplay contributed to its disappointing sales.

== Track listing ==
All songs written by Gary Numan.

All timings are approximate and will vary slightly with different equipment.

=== 1984 Numa vinyl release (NUMA 1001) ===
1. "Berserker" – 5:52
2. "This Is New Love" – 6:19
3. "The Secret" – 5:55
4. "My Dying Machine" – 5:37
5. "Cold Warning" – 6:01
6. "Pump It Up" – 4:45
7. "The God Film" – 4:42
8. "A Child with the Ghost" – 4:04
9. "The Hunter" – 4:32

=== 1991 Numa CD reissues (NUMACD 1001) ===
1. "Berserker" – 6:46
2. "This Is New Love" – 8.48
3. "The Secret" – 6:45
4. "My Dying Machine" – 9:23
5. "Cold Warning" – 7:03
6. "Pump It Up" – 4:51
7. "The God Film" – 4:44
8. "A Child with the Ghost" – 4:04
9. "The Hunter" – 6:48
- Original copies have no barcode and the CD printing is in blue. The second NUMA reissue is barcoded, has a different rear picture sleeve and the CD printing is in black. The catalogue numbers are identical.

=== 1999 Cleopatra US CD reissue (CLP 0536-2) ===
1. "Berserker" – 5:52
2. "This Is New Love" – 6:19
3. "The Secret" – 5:55
4. "My Dying Machine" – 5:37
5. "Cold Warning" – 6:01
6. "Pump It Up" – 4:45
7. "The God Film" – 4:42
8. "A Child with the Ghost" – 4:04
9. "The Hunter" – 4:32
10. "Berserker" (Extended) – 6:47
11. "Empty Bed, Empty Heart" – 3:12
12. "My Dying Machine" (Extended) – 9:23
13. "Here Am I" – 5:46

=== 1999 Eagle Records UK CD reissue (EAMCD072) ===
1. "Berserker" – 5:52
2. "This Is New Love" – 6:19
3. "The Secret" – 5:55
4. "My Dying Machine" – 5:37
5. "Cold Warning" – 6:01
6. "Pump It Up" – 4:45
7. "The God Film" – 4:42
8. "A Child with the Ghost" – 4:04
9. "The Hunter" – 4:32
10. "Empty Bed, Empty Heart" – 3:12
11. "Here Am I" – 5:46
12. "She Cries" – 6:01
13. "Rumour" – 2:50
14. "This Ship Comes Apart" – 4:01
- "Rumour", although a Numan solo track for the Berserker sessions, was also the B-side to the "London Times" single with Radio Heart in 1987.
- "She Cries", a B-side on the "My Dying Machine" single, was a remixed demo from the I, Assassin (1982) album sessions.
- "A Child with the Ghost" was also recorded by Tik and Tok, appearing on their studio Intolerance (1984).
- "Pump It Up" was also recorded by Caroline Munro as "Pump Me Up" and released as a single on Numan's Numa label.

=== 2025 Extended; Remaster ===
1. "Berserker" – 5:52
2. "This Is New Love" – 6:21
3. "The Secret" – 5:56
4. "My Dying Machine" – 5:36
5. "Cold Warning" – 6:03
6. "Pump It Up" – 4:49
7. "The God Film" – 4:43
8. "A Child With The Ghost" – 4:10
9. "The Hunter" – 4:33
10. "Empty Bed, Empty Heart" – 3:11
11. "Here Am I" – 5:46
12. "She Cries" – 6:01
13. "Rumour" – 2:50
14. "This Ship Comes Apart" – 3:59
15. "Berserker (Extended Version)" – 6:38
16. "This Is New Love (Extended Version)" – 8:45
17. "The Secret (Extended Version)" – 6:40
18. "My Dying Machine (Extended Version)" – 9:17
19. "Cold Warning (Extended Version)" – 6:54
20. "The Hunter (Extended Version)" – 6:44

== Personnel ==
Credits are adapted from the Berserker liner notes.

Musicians

- Gary Numan – vocals; keyboards
- Chris Payne – viola; keyboards
- Cedric Sharpley – drums
- Russell Bell – guitar
- John Webb – keyboards; programming
- Martin Elliott – bass
- Andy Coughlan – bass (on "Cold Warning")
- Pat Kyle – saxophone
- Tessa Niles – backing vocals
- Tracy Ackerman – backing vocals
- Zaine Griff – backing vocals (on "The Secret")
- Mike Smith – PPG Wave programming
- Ian Herron – PPG Wave programming
