= Tubeway Army (album) =

Studio album by Tubeway Army
- Released: 24 November 1978
- Recorded: July–August 1978
- Studio: Spaceward (Cambridge)
- Genre: Rock; post-punk; new wave
- Length: 39:11 (original release); 77:59 (CD reissue)
- Label: Beggars Banquet
- Producer: Gary Numan

Tubeway Army chronology
| Tubeway Army (1978) | Replicas (1979) |

Alternate cover
- The revised cover art used on most reissues since 1979

Professional ratings
Review scores
| Source | Rating |
|---|---|
| AllMusic | 4/5 stars |
| Smash Hits | 7/10 |

Tubeway Army is the debut studio album by the English new wave band Tubeway Army, released on 24 November 1978 by Beggars Banquet Records. Its initial limited-edition run of 5,000 (known unofficially as the Blue Album due to its coloured vinyl and cover) sold out but this was not enough for it to chart. When reissued in mid-1979, following the success of the follow-up Replicas (1979), the more commonly known cover art featuring a stylised portrait of Gary Numan was introduced. This release made No. 14 in the UK Albums Chart.

== Overview ==
Despite being the band's debut, Tubeway Army was seen as a transitional record, linking the punk flavour of early singles "That's Too Bad" and "Bombers" with the electronic music and science fiction imagery of Replicas. The first track, "Listen to the Sirens", borrowed its opening line from the Philip K. Dick novel Flow My Tears, The Policeman Said, while "Steel and You" contained references to androids ("Just my steel friend and me / I stand brave by his side"). These and a number of other tracks featured primitive synthesizer effects, the legacy of Numan chancing upon a Minimoog in the recording studio one day.

Elsewhere, the album's lyrics generally inhabited a seedy world that was compared to William Burroughs, an author whose influence Numan acknowledged. "Friends" concerned male prostitution. "Every Day I Die" was about teenage masturbation. "Jo the Waiter" referenced drug addiction. "The Life Machine" was told from the perspective of a comatose man on life support who can only "watch from somewhere as the loved ones come and go".

Major influences cited for this album's overall sound included David Bowie (both 'Ziggy' and 'Berlin' eras), early Roxy Music and Brian Eno, Lou Reed and The Velvet Underground, and early Ultravox.

== Critical reception ==
Upon its reissue in 1979 following the success of Tubeway Army's second album Replicas, the album was given a 7 out of 10 rating in Smash Hits. Reviewer Red Starr wrote: "Inevitably it's not as good as "Replicas" — it's cruder and punkier, with more guitars than synthesisers, though that voice is instantly recognisable. Lyrically, future visions are to the fore again — all test tube babies and dream police. Not bad at all, however, but interesting to look back on rather than a must for the present. Besttrax: "Jo The Waiter", "Listen To The Sirens"."

== Charts ==
| Chart (1979) | Peak position |
|---|---|
| UK Albums (OCC) | 14 |
| Chart (2023) | Peak position |
| Scottish Albums (OCC) | 14 |
| UK Albums (OCC) | 72 |
| UK Independent Albums (OCC) | 3 |

== Live at the Roxy ==
The 1998 CD reissue of Tubeway Army included a live concert, originally a bootleg called Live at the Roxy, retitled as Living Ornaments '78 – a retrospective reference to Numan's official live albums Living Ornaments '79 (1981), '80 (1981) and '81 (1998). It included early versions of "My Shadow in Vain" and "Friends" ("Do Your Best") as well as a cover of The Velvet Underground's "White Light/White Heat".

== Cover versions ==
- Crust punk/death metal band Deviated Instinct covered "Listen to the Sirens" on their 1990 EP Nailed.
- The 1997 Numan tribute album Random featured covers of Tubeway Army songs by Pop Will Eat Itself ("Friends"), The Orb ("Jo the Waiter") and Dubstar ("Every Day I Die").
- Terre Thaemlitz recorded a piano version of "Friends", released in 1999 on the Numan tribute album Replicas Rubato.
- Stoner metal band Red Fang covered "Listen to the Sirens" in 2018 and released it as a single and a music video.

== Track listing ==
All songs written by Gary Numan, except "White Light/White Heat" (Lou Reed).

| No. | Title | Length |
|---|---|---|
| 1. | "Listen to the Sirens" | 3:06 |
| 2. | "My Shadow in Vain" | 2:59 |
| 3. | "The Life Machine" | 2:45 |
| 4. | "Friends" | 2:30 |
| 5. | "Something's in the House" | 4:14 |
| 6. | "Everyday I Die" | 2:24 |
| 7. | "Steel and You" | 4:44 |
| 8. | "My Love Is a Liquid" | 3:33 |
| 9. | "Are You Real?" | 3:25 |
| 10. | "The Dream Police" | 3:38 |
| 11. | "Jo the Waiter" | 2:41 |
| 12. | "Zero Bars (Mr. Smith)" | 3:12 |
| Total length: | | 39:11 |

1998 CD reissue bonus tracks (Living Ornaments '78)
| No. | Title | Length |
|---|---|---|
| 13. | "Positive Thinking (Live)" | 2:56 |
| 14. | "Boys (Live)" | 2:13 |
| 15. | "Blue Eyes (Live)" | 2:03 |
| 16. | "You Don't Know Me (Live)" | 2:28 |
| 17. | "My Shadow in Vain (Live)" | 4:13 |
| 18. | "Me My Head (Live)" | 4:10 |
| 19. | "That's Too Bad (Live)" | 3:26 |
| 20. | "Basic J (Live)" | 3:03 |
| 21. | "Do Your Best (Live)" | 2:40 |
| 22. | "Oh! Didn't I Say (Live)" | 2:31 |
| 23. | "I'm a Poseur (Live)" | 2:30 |
| 24. | "White Light/White Heat (Live)" | 2:49 |
| 25. | "Kill St. Joy (Live)" | 3:46 |
| Total length: | | 77:59 |

== Personnel ==
Tubeway Army

- Gary Numan – guitars, lead vocals, keyboards
- Paul Gardiner – bass guitar, backing vocals
- Jess Lidyard – drums

Technical

- Gary Numan – producer
- Mike Kemp – engineer, mixer
- John Dent – digital remastering

== Notes ==
numanme.co.uk
