= Paul Gardiner =

English musician (1958–1984)

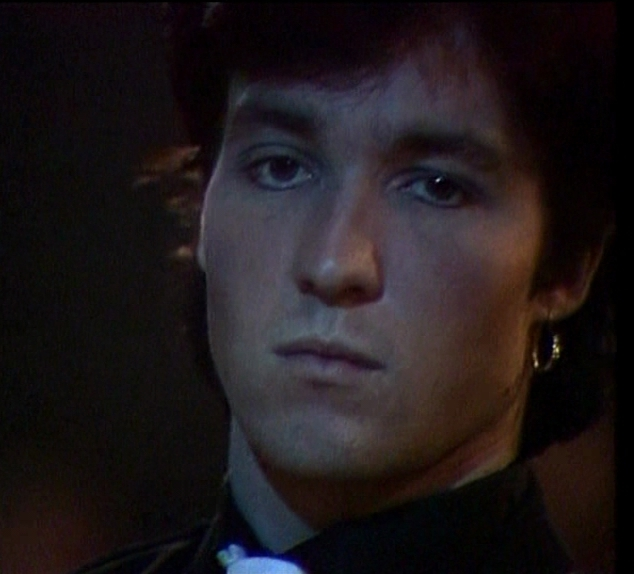

Background information
- Born: Paul Andrew Gardiner; 1 May 1958; Hayes, Middlesex, England
- Died: 18 February 1984 (aged 25) Northolt, England
- Genres: Rock; electronic; synth-pop; new wave; post-punk; punk rock
- Occupations: Musician; songwriter
- Instruments: Bass; guitar; keyboards
- Years active: 1976–1984
- Labels: Beggars Banquet; Numa
- Formerly of: Tubeway Army; The Lasers

Paul Andrew Gardiner (1 May 1958 – 18 February 1984) was an English musician who played bass guitar with Gary Numan and Tubeway Army, as well as creating material under his own name.

== Biography ==
Paul Andrew Gardiner was born on 1 May 1958 in Hayes, Middlesex. In early 1976 he was playing in a band called the Lasers when Gary Numan (then using his real name, Gary Webb) auditioned as lead guitarist. The two became friends and when Numan left the band soon after, Gardiner followed. The pair formed Tubeway Army, initially with Numan's uncle Jess Lidyard on drums. In October 1977, the band was signed to the independent label Beggars Banquet and released their first single, "That's Too Bad", in February 1978. The trio used assumed names, Gardiner's being 'Scarlett'.

An ever-changing line-up played gigs over the next few months, Gardiner and Numan being the only constant members. Settling back to a three-piece outfit with Lidyard, the band released two studio albums as Tubeway Army, an eponymously titled debut in 1978 and the No. 1 hit Replicas in 1979. When Numan dropped the name Tubeway Army in mid-1979, Gardiner remained as bassist, playing on the No. 1 albums The Pleasure Principle (1979) and Telekon (1980), and toured with Numan throughout the world in 1979–81.

Following Numan's 'retirement' in April 1981, after final concerts at Wembley Arena, his backing band went its separate ways. Most of the members formed a new group called Dramatis, while Gardiner elected to concentrate on a solo career. Gardiner's debut solo release was a single co-written with Numan called "Stormtrooper in Drag" b/w "Night Talk" in 1981. It made No. 49 in the UK Singles Chart. On these tracks Gardiner and Numan were credited with guitar and bass, respectively; Gardiner also played synthesizer.

Gardiner's recording of The Velvet Underground's "Venus in Furs" was the first release on Numan's own label, Numa, in 1984. The single's B-side, "No Sense", was written by Gardiner. Aside from work on solo projects, he played with Dramatis in 1982 and, shortly before his death, worked with Marc Anthony Thompson of Chocolate Genius, Inc. on the latter's debut solo studio album.

== Death ==
Paul Gardiner struggled with heroin addiction in his last years and died at the age of 25 from an overdose of Valium and Diconal combined with cold weather on 18 February 1984 in Limetrees Park in Northolt, Greater London. He is survived by a son, Chris.

== Tributes ==
Gary Numan wrote the song "A Child with the Ghost" from his sixth solo studio album Berserker (1984) in memory of Gardiner. He also paid tribute to Gardiner on the 10th and 20th anniversaries of his death by playing, respectively, "Stormtrooper in Drag" on his 1994 tour (released on the 1995 live album Dark Light) and "Night Talk" at a 2004 charity gig.

During the 2009 Pleasure Principle tour, Numan paid tribute to Gardiner on the 25th anniversary of his death by playing "Complex" (the demo version) with a picture of Gardiner displayed on the large screen background.

== Discography ==
=== Albums ===
==== Tubeway Army ====
- The Plan (demos recorded in 1977, first released in 1984)
- Tubeway Army (1978)
- Replicas (1979)

==== Gary Numan ====
- The Pleasure Principle (1979)
- Telekon (1980)
- Living Ornaments '79 (live recording first released in 1981, expanded/re-released as Living Ornaments '79 in 1998)
- Living Ornaments '80 (live recording first released in 1981, expanded/re-released as Living Ornaments '80 in 2005)
- Living Ornaments '81 (live recording, first released 1998)
- Dance (1981)

==== Robert Palmer ====
- Clues (1980) – "I Dream of Wires"

==== Marc Anthony Thompson ====
- Marc Anthony Thompson (1984)

=== Singles ===
==== Tubeway Army ====
- "That's Too Bad" (1978)
- "Bombers" (1978)
- "Down in the Park" (1979)
- "Are "Friends" Electric?" (1979)

==== Gary Numan ====
- "Cars" (1979)
- "Complex" (1979)
- "We Are Glass" (1980)
- "I Die: You Die" (1980)
- "This Wreckage" (1980)

==== Paul Gardiner ====
- "Stormtrooper in Drag" (1981) – although released under Gardiner's name, the lead vocals were by Gary Numan. John Webb played drums.
- "Venus in Furs" (1984)

==== Marc Anthony Thompson ====
- "Love Cools Down" (1984)
