= The Plan (Tubeway Army album) =

Compilation album by Gary Numan / Tubeway Army
- Released: September 1984
- Recorded: March 1978
- Genre: Punk rock; new wave; electronic; post-punk
- Length: 67:50 (1993 CD reissue); 70:44 (1999 CD reissue)
- Label: Beggars Banquet
- Producer: Gary Numan, Mike Kemp

Gary Numan / Tubeway Army chronology
Warriors (1983)	The Plan (1984)	Berserker (1984)

Professional ratings
Review scores
Source	Rating
AllMusic	3/5 stars

The Plan is an archival compilation album of early demo recordings by British new wave band Tubeway Army (the band name originally used by Gary Numan), released in 1984.

While the demos on The Plan were originally recorded in March 1978, they remained unreleased until September 1984 when Numan's former label, Beggars Banquet Records, issued them a year after Numan left the label. In the intervening seven years since recording the demos, Numan's career had scaled great heights of commercial success and then waned. His most successful material had been similar in basic form and structure to the demos on The Plan, but had showcased a new synthesizer-based instrumentation instead of his previous punk rock sound.

In the album's liner notes, Numan states that these songs were deliberately written and recorded in the then-popular punk rock style with the express aim of securing a record deal. Some of the songs on the album (such as "Friends," "Something's in the House" and "My Shadow in Vain") formed the basis for songs that would eventually be released on Tubeway Army's debut album in 1978, subsequently rearranged and augmented with the synthesizer-based rock sound which would become the Tubeway Army/Numan trademark.

The Plan went on to do moderately well, reaching #29 on the UK album chart. Two months after The Plan's release, Numan issued Berserker, his first album through his own record label, Numa Records. Chart-wise, The Plan outperformed Berserker, the latter reaching #45 on the UK album chart.

All CD releases of The Plan include a wealth of bonus tracks, such as Tubeway Army's debut single "That's Too Bad" and an early version of the Tubeway Army album track "The Life Machine."

== Track listing ==
All tracks written by Gary Numan.

=== Original LP ===
Side one
No.	Title	Length
1.	"This Is My Life"	2:16
2.	"My Shadow in Vain"	4:05
3.	"Critics"	1:51
4.	"Mean Street"	3:14
5.	"Thoughts No. 2"	3:23
6.	"Bombers"	3:53

Side two
No.	Title	Length
1.	"Basic J."	2:51
2.	"Ice"	2:14
3.	"Something's in the House"	4:06
4.	"Friends"	2:32
5.	"Check It"	3:34
6.	"Steel and You"	3:55

=== 1993 CD reissue ===
In 1993, Beggars Banquet issued a digitally remastered version of the album on CD, featuring 10 bonus tracks and a different running order. This release was packaged with Tubeway Army's 1979 album Replicas and was part of a series of double CDs, each of which paired two of Numan's albums together, remastered, with bonus tracks and new liner notes.

No.	Title	Length
1.	"That's Too Bad" (single version)	3:20
2.	"Oh! Didn't I Say"	2:16
3.	"Out of Sight"	3:27
4.	"That's Too Bad" (original version)	3:15
5.	"Bombers" (original version)	3:53
6.	"My Shadow in Vain" (original version)	4:05
7.	"This Machine (Steel and You)" (original version of "Steel and You")	3:55
8.	"Thoughts No. 2"	3:23
9.	"Something's in the House" (original version)	4:06
10.	"Check It"	3:34
11.	"The Monday Troop"	2:57
12.	"This Is My Life"	2:16
13.	"Mean Street"	3:14
14.	"Ice"	2:14
15.	"Crime of Passion"	3:35
16.	"The Life Machine" (original version)	1:52
17.	"Critics"	1:51
18.	"Do Your Best (Friends)" (original version of "Friends")	2:32
19.	"Basic J."	2:51
20.	"Bombers" (Single Version)	3:52
21.	"Blue Eyes"	1:44
22.	"O.D. Receiver"	2:38

==== 1999 CD reissue bonus tracks ====
In 1999, Beggars Banquet reissued the CD as a stand-alone release, newly remastered, with the further addition of two bonus tracks.

No.	Title	Length
23.	"Fadeout 1930"	3:13
24.	"Don't Be a Dummy" (Lee Cooper advert)	0:30
