= Metal (song) =

Song by Gary Numan

from the album The Pleasure Principle
- Released: September 1979
- Recorded: 1979 at Marcus Music AB (London)
- Genre: New wave, post-punk, synthpop
- Length: 3:22
- Label: Beggars Banquet Records
- Songwriter(s): Gary Numan
- Producer(s): Gary Numan

"Metal" is a song by Gary Numan from his 1979 album The Pleasure Principle. Lyrically, the song is heavily inspired by science fiction such as the works of Philip K. Dick and William S. Burroughs, and tells the story of an android who wishes to be human but never can be. The song was the B-side of "Cars" in the U.S. Its bass line is influenced by the Beach Boys' 1968 song "Do It Again". The song was released with an accompanying music video. The song recycles lyrics from two outtakes of the songs "The Crazies" and "We Have a Technical" from the recording sessions for Numan's album Replicas, which had been released earlier in 1979.

"Metal" has been a regular feature of Numan's live shows since his first tour in 1979, and appears on the majority of his live albums. In 1981, he wrote new lyrics to the tune of "Metal" for his album Dance and renamed the song "Moral". He often performs this re-recorded version. The song was again reworked into his aggressive new style in 1998, a version which is also still performed today.

The song has been covered by artists such as Nine Inch Nails, Thought Industry, Afrika Bambaataa (featuring Numan himself), Nouvelle Vague, and Poppy. Poppy's version is on the soundtrack of the 2019 video game WWE 2K20.
