= Complex (song) =

Single by Gary Numan

from the album The Pleasure Principle
- B-side: "Bombers (Live Version)"
- Released: 16 November 1979
- Recorded: Marcus Music AB, London, 1979
- Genre: New wave; synth-pop
- Length: 3:13
- Label: Beggars Banquet; BEG 29
- Songwriter: Gary Numan
- Producer: Gary Numan

Gary Numan singles chronology
"Cars" (1979)	"Complex" (1979)	"We Are Glass" (1980)

"Complex" is a song by the English musician Gary Numan. It was the second single to be taken from his 1979 album The Pleasure Principle. The single reached number six on the UK singles chart in late November 1979.

The recording's backing track uses conventional acoustic drums, acoustic piano, and electric bass guitar, joined by violin (played by Ultravox's Billy Currie), viola and heavily flanged and reverberated analogue monosynth.

Despite the success of the single, which spent two weeks in the UK top 10 during a nine-week chart run, Numan later regretted "Complex" as the choice of a single and that the second single of The Pleasure Principle should have been "Metal".

Live versions of "Complex" are included on Living Ornaments '81 and on the expanded CD release of Living Ornaments '80. The song was performed live on the "Pleasure Principle 30th anniversary tour" in 2009, featuring guest appearances by Chris Payne who plays viola on the original recording.

== Track listing ==
7" (Beggars Banquet BEG 29)

A. Complex - 3.10

B. Bombers (live version) - 5.47

12" (Beggars Banquet BEG 29 T)

A. Complex - 3.10

B1. Me! I Disconnect From You (Live Version)

B2. Bombers (live version) - 5.47

Live tracks recorded at Hammersmith Odeon, 28 September 1979.
