= Living Ornaments '80 =

Live album by Gary Numan
- Released: 24 April 1981
- Recorded: Hammersmith Odeon, London, 16 September 1980
- Genre: New wave, synthpop
- Length: 134:24
- Label: Beggars Banquet Records
- Producer: Gary Numan

Gary Numan chronology
Living Ornaments '79 (1981)	Living Ornaments '80 (1981)	Living Ornaments '79 and '80 (1981)

Professional ratings
Review scores
Source	Rating
AllMusic	3.5/5 stars

Living Ornaments '80 is a live album by British musician Gary Numan, first released in 1981. It was also issued as a limited edition box set with Living Ornaments '79 (as Living Ornaments '79 and '80) the same year. The original Living Ornaments '80 was a condensed version of a concert recorded at the Hammersmith Odeon on 16 September 1980, as a record of Numan's "Teletour" (September–November 1980).

An expanded and remastered version of Living Ornaments '80 was reissued on a double CD in 2005. When Living Ornaments '79 was reissued in expanded/remastered form in 1998, an expanded version of Living Ornaments '80 was planned for release at the same time. However, the multitrack tapes of the full concert from which the original album's ten tracks were culled had been lost. It was therefore decided to release, for the first time, Living Ornaments '81, a 2CD concert recording of Numan's "farewell show" at Wembley Arena in April 1981.

An expanded edition of Living Ornaments '80 eventuated in 2005 when a mono mixing console recording of a complete song set from another 1980 UK concert was discovered in 2004 and deemed to be of sufficient quality to release commercially. Although the venue and date of this set have not been confirmed, it is speculated to be the Newcastle City Hall on 29 September 1980, the last UK date of the Teletour before the American leg of the tour. The 29-track edition of Living Ornaments '80 released in 2005 contains the 10 tracks of the Hammersmith Odeon show followed by 19 tracks from the undated show.

The 2005 edition of Living Ornaments '80 included, at that time, the only official live recordings of the tracks "Telekon", from the album of the same name, and "Stories", from Numan's then-forthcoming Dance album (1981). A live version of "Telekon" has since appeared on the Telekon – Live album (2008), recorded during Numan's Telekon Classic Album Tour of 2006, although no further live versions of "Stories" have been officially released.

== Track listing ==
All songs written by Gary Numan.

=== Original version ===
==== Side one ====
1. "This Wreckage" – 5:20
2. "I Die: You Die" – 3:38
3. "M.E." – 4:27
4. "Everyday I Die" – 4:22
5. "Down in the Park" – 5:55

==== Side two ====
1. "Remind Me to Smile" – 3:40
2. "The Joy Circuit" – 5:47
3. "Tracks" – 2:43
4. "Are 'Friends' Electric?" – 5:30
5. "We Are Glass" – 4:32

=== Remastered version ===
==== Disc one ====
1. "This Wreckage"
2. "I Die: You Die"
3. "M.E."
4. "Everyday I Die"
5. "Down in the Park"
6. "Remind Me to Smile"
7. "The Joy Circuit"
8. "Tracks"
9. "Are 'Friends' Electric?"
10. "We Are Glass"
11. "This Wreckage"
12. "Remind Me to Smile"
13. "Complex"
14. "Telekon"

==== Disc two ====
1. "Me! I Disconnect From You"
2. "Cars"
3. "Conversation"
4. "Airlane"
5. "M.E."
6. "Everyday I Die"
7. "Remember I Was Vapour"
8. "Stories"
9. "Are 'Friends' Electric?"
10. "The Joy Circuit"
11. "I Die: You Die"
12. "I Dream of Wires"
13. "Down in the Park"
14. "Tracks"
15. "We Are Glass"

Tracks 1–10 on disc one comprise the original Living Ornaments '80 set, recorded on stereo multitrack. The rest of the tracks on disc one and all of the tracks on disc two comprise the recovered, undated show, recorded in mono; being a soundboard recording, the audience noise is noticeably distant compared to the Hammersmith Odeon show recording. Film footage of the live version of "Down in the Park" from the original Living Ornaments '80 show was included in the music concert anthology film Urgh! A Music War (1981); the track was included on that film's accompanying soundtrack album, released in the same year.

== Personnel ==
- Gary Numan – vocals, guitar, synthesizer, producer, mixer
- Roger Mason – keyboards
- Cedric Sharpley – drums
- Chris Payne – keyboards, viola
- Paul Gardiner – bass
- Russell Bell – guitar, keyboards, percussion
- Tim Summerhayes – engineer
- Phil Thornalley – assistant engineer
- Will Gosling – assistant mixer

== Charts ==
- Original album #39 (UK Albums Chart)
- Living Ornaments '79/'80 box set #2 (UK Albums Chart)
