= That's Too Bad =

Single by Tubeway Army
- B-side: "Oh! Didn't I Say"
- Released: 10 February 1978
- Recorded: 16 October 1977
- Studio: Spaceward, Cambridge
- Genre: Punk rock
- Length: 3:20
- Label: Beggars Banquet; BEG 5
- Songwriter(s): Gary Webb (Gary Numan)

Tubeway Army singles chronology
"That's Too Bad" (1978)	"Bombers" (1978)

"That's Too Bad" is the debut single by the English new wave band Tubeway Army, the band which provided the initial musical vehicle for Gary Numan. It was released in February 1978 by independent London record label Beggars Banquet. On the day of its release, Numan quit his job in a warehouse to become a professional musician.

Although it failed to enter the UK Singles Charts, "That's Too Bad" nonetheless sold relatively well, taking into account the small numbers pressed (4,000) and the lowly status of both label and artist. Numan later said, "The song was written 99% to get a contract. It was a naive attempt to make punk commercial, which it didn't do!"

The B-side of the single was "Oh! Didn't I Say". Both songs are in an aggressive punk rock style, very different from the synthesizer-based music which became Numan's trademark.

At this stage of his career, Numan (born Gary Webb) had not yet found his future stage name and called himself 'Valerian'; his bandmates Paul Gardiner ('Scarlett') and Jess Lidyard ('Rael') also used assumed names. Webb's compositional credits on the original vinyl single were under the Valerian pseudonym as well. The back of the original vinyl single's sleeve contained two discrepancies: Valerian was spelt 'Valeriun'; and the band picture featured live drummer Bob Simmonds, not Jess Lidyard who actually played in the recording session.

"That's Too Bad" was also later released as a gatefold with the single "Bombers" in August 1979. It was released in its original form in 1983 and reached No.97 in the UK Charts.

These tracks have subsequently been included on CD reissues of the album The Plan (1984).

== Track listing ==
1. "That's Too Bad" (Valerian) – 3:20
2. "Oh! Didn't I Say" (Valerian) – 2:16

== Credits and personnel ==
- Valerian (Gary Numan) – vocals, guitar
- Scarlett (Paul Gardiner) – bass guitar
- Rael (Jess Lidyard) – drums

== Versions ==
Versions of "That's Too Bad" released to date include:

- The original track, recorded 16 October 1977 at Spaceward Studios, near Cambridge. This version was not released to the public until 1983, and re-issued on yellow vinyl in 1985 on the 1978 EP of early Tubeway Army recordings.
- The single version, a remix by Mick Glossop of the original recording, done at Manor Studio, Oxfordshire. This new mix brought forward the vocals that had been buried in the earlier version. It was released on 10 February 1978 as Tubeway Army's debut. Both the original and single mixes have since appeared on CD reissues of The Plan.
- A live version thought to have been recorded in January or February 1978. This was part of a bootleg called Live at the Roxy that was officially released and retitled Living Ornaments '78 on the 1998 CD reissue of the debut album Tubeway Army. It also contained a recording of "Oh! Didn't I Say" from the same gig.
- A live version recorded on 6 November 1993 and released on the double album Dream Corrosion (1994).
