= Down in the Park =

Single by Tubeway Army

from the album Replicas
- B-side: "Do You Need the Service?"
- Released: 30 March 1979
- Recorded: Gooseberry Studios, London, January 1979
- Genre: Electronic rock
- Length: 4:22
- Label: Beggars Banquet; BEG 17 (7") / BEG 17T (12")
- Songwriter: Gary Numan
- Producer: Gary Numan

Tubeway Army singles chronology
"Bombers" (1978)	"Down in the Park" (1979)	"Are "Friends" Electric?" (1979)

Audio
- "Down in the Park" by Gary Numan on YouTube

"Down in the Park" is a 1979 song by the English new wave band Tubeway Army, featuring lead vocals by Gary Numan. It was released as the first single from the band's second album Replicas, though was not a hit. The song was written and produced by the band's frontman Gary Numan, and despite its lack of commercial success, has been performed by Numan regularly in his live shows throughout the years.

== Style ==
Like the Replicas album as a whole, "Down in the Park" marked a major shift from Tubeway Army's previous output. The band's early releases, the 1978 singles "That's Too Bad" and "Bombers" plus the self-titled debut album, contained elements of punk, hard rock, heavy metal and new wave but were exclusively guitar driven with only occasional use of primitive synthesizer effects. "Down in the Park", on the other hand, was Numan's first composition on keyboards and his first release to feature the predominantly electronic sound that became his trademark. Musically, it pared down still further the guitar power chord and bass root note style arrangements he had used previously, reducing the harmony to bare unisons of layered bass guitar, Fender Rhodes electric piano, and Polymoog synthesizer. The semitone key changes (A to B♭) and chromatic melodic riffs between the song's verses are somewhat unusual in the context of traditional Western music theory, although they are less unusual in rock music.

== Lyrics ==
Lyrically the song crystallised the dystopian science fiction concept that was the basis of the Replicas album. Heavily influenced by such writers as J. G. Ballard and Philip K. Dick, it tells the story of a futuristic park in which Machmen (androids with human skin) and machines kill human beings to entertain spectators who, along with their numerically named robotic "friends" ("Down in the Park, with a friend called Five"), view the carnage from a nearby restaurant, "Zom Zoms" – the name inspired by a recurring reference to the Zum Zum restaurant chain in the Jobriath song "Scumbag".

== Theme ==
The piece was typical of Numan's themes at the time, both embracing and fearing technology. In contrast to much contemporary post-punk music, and his own earlier releases, Numan's vocals were deliberately underplayed, leaving the slow and stately synthesizer work to evoke the song's melancholy atmosphere.

== B-side ==
In what would become Numan's normal practice, the B-side was a non-album track, in this case "Do You Need the Service?"; the title referenced a line from the works of William S. Burroughs, the service in question meaning pest control. The 12" single included the same tracks as the 7" along with "I Nearly Married A Human (2)", a different mix from the version on Replicas this time featuring drum machine throughout and Numan's recitation of the song's title, the only words heard.

== Cover versions ==
"Down in the Park" has been covered by a number of artists, notably Marilyn Manson on the "Lunchbox" and "Sweet Dreams (Are Made of This)" singles (1995), Foo Fighters on The X-Files Songs in the Key of X soundtrack album (1996), DJ Hell (a 1998 techno version with lyrics translated in French entitled "Dans Le Parc"), Christian Death (a live performance on The Iron Mask), Girls Under Glass, and Jimi Tenor on the Numan tribute album Random. Terre Thaemlitz recorded two instrumental versions of "Down in the Park" on the tribute album Replicas Rubato, one on piano and the other on synthesiser (the latter a hidden track). Curve did a cover version also sung by Gary Numan, who appears as a guest vocalist. Other tribute acts to have recorded the song include Bytet and Reload, on the albums Ghost of a White Face Clown and Tubeway Navy respectively. On various dates of the 2009 Nine Inch Nails Wave Goodbye Tour, Trent Reznor and his band performed a version featuring Gary Numan on vocals and David Bowie collaborator, Mike Garson, on grand piano. In 2021, German electronic band Blutengel included a cover on the album Fountain of Destiny.

== Live performances ==
"Down in the Park" has been a mainstay of Numan's concerts since his 1979 tour, and appears on almost all of his live albums. An arrangement with solo piano introduction appeared on the Living Ornaments '80 LP, in the movie Urgh! A Music War, and in the Micromusic video concert from Wembley Arena (soundtrack released as Living Ornaments '81). A version for piano alone was the flip side of Numan's single "I Die: You Die" in 1980 (and was also included as a bonus track on the 1998 CD re-issue of Telekon). The original song was remixed twice for the 2003 collection Hybrid, and a demo version of the song was included on the soundtrack of the movie Times Square (1980).

== Track listing ==
7" version:

1. "Down in the Park" (Numan) – 4:22
2. "Do You Need the Service?" (Numan) – 3:39

12" version:

1. "Down in the Park" (Numan) – 4:22
2. "Do You Need the Service?" (Numan) – 3:39
3. "I Nearly Married a Human (2)" (Numan) – 6:38

== Personnel ==
- Gary Numan – Minimoog synthesizer, Polymoog synthesizer, Fender Rhodes electric piano, vocals, production
- Paul Gardiner – Bass guitar
- Jess Lidyard – Drums

== Charts ==
Chart (1979)	Peak position
UK The Singles Chart (Record Business)	94

== Notes ==
- Paul Goodwin (2004). Electric Pioneer: An Armchair Guide to Gary Numan.
