= Gary Numan =

British musician (born 1958)

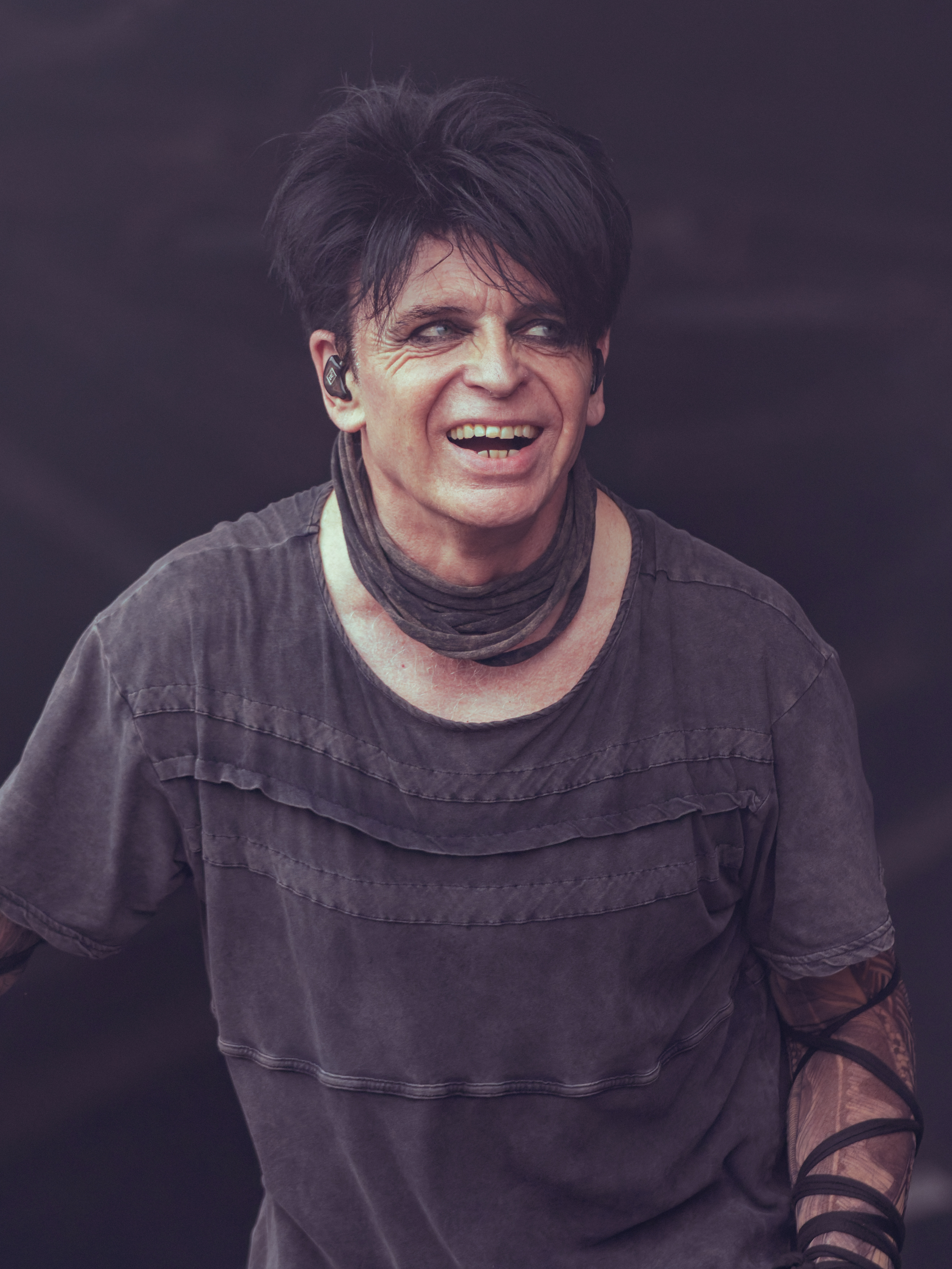
- Numan in 2025
- Born: Gary Anthony James Webb; 8 March 1958 (age 68); London, England
- Occupations: Musician; singer; songwriter; record producer
- Years active: 1976–present
- Works: Discography
- Spouse: Gemma O'Neill (m. 1997)
- Children: 3
- Musical career
- Genres: Synth-pop; new wave; electronica; gothic rock; post-punk; industrial rock; punk rock (early)
- Instruments: Vocals; guitar; keyboards; synthesizer
- Labels: Atco; Beggars Banquet; Numa; NBR; Illegal; I.R.S.; Eagle; Machine Music Ltd.; Jagged Halo; Cooking Vinyl; Metropolis; Cleopatra; Mortal; BMG
- Formerly of: Tubeway Army; Sharpe & Numan
- Website: www.garynuman.co.uk

Gary Anthony James Webb (born 8 March 1958), known professionally as Gary Numan, is an English musician. He entered the music industry as frontman of the new wave band Tubeway Army. The band's second and final album, 1979's Replicas, reached No. 1 on the UK Albums Chart, and spawned a UK No. 1 single with "Are 'Friends' Electric?". Following the band's split, he released his debut solo album The Pleasure Principle later in 1979, which also reached No. 1 in the UK and produced another UK No. 1 single with "Cars". Although his commercial popularity peaked in the late 1970s and early 1980s, he has maintained a strong cult following since then. He has sold over 10 million records.

Numan is regarded as a pioneer of electronic music. He developed a signature sound consisting of heavy synthesizer hooks fed through guitar effects pedals, and is also known for his distinctive voice and androgynous "android" persona. He received an Ivor Novello Award, the Inspiration Award, from the British Academy of Songwriters, Composers, and Authors in 2017. In June 2025, Numan made his debut at the Glastonbury Festival.

== Early life ==
Gary Anthony James Webb was born on 8 March 1958 in Hammersmith, West London. His father was a British Airways bus driver based at Heathrow Airport. He was seven when his family adopted his cousin (father's nephew) John, who would become a musician and play in Numan's backing band. He was educated at Town Farm Junior School in Stanwell, Surrey; Ashford County Grammar School; and Slough Grammar School, followed by Brooklands Technical College in Weybridge, Surrey. He joined the Air Training Corps as a teenager and briefly held various jobs including Heathrow Airport bus driver, forklift truck driver, air conditioning ventilator fitter, and accounts clerk.

When Numan was 15, his father bought him a Gibson Les Paul guitar, which became his most treasured possession. He briefly played in various bands and looked through advertisements in Melody Maker for bands to join. He claims to have unsuccessfully auditioned as guitarist for the then-unknown band the Jam before joining Mean Street and the Lasers, where he met Paul Gardiner. The latter band would soon become Tubeway Army, with his uncle Jess Lidyard on drums and Gardiner on bass. The band signed a recording contract with Beggars Banquet Records. His initial pseudonym was Valerian, probably in reference to the hero in French science fiction comic series Valérian and Laureline. He later picked the surname Numan from an advertisement in the yellow pages for a plumber whose surname was Neumann.

== Music career ==
=== 1976–1981: Tubeway Army and the "Machine Trilogy" ===
Numan came to prominence in the 1970s as lead vocalist, guitarist, songwriter, and record producer for Tubeway Army. After adopting a punk rock-style, they signed a recording contract with Beggars Banquet Records and released their debut single "That's Too Bad" in February 1978, an attempt at making commercial punk music. It was followed by the recording of an album's worth of demo tapes in March 1978 (later released in 1984 as The Plan), and a second single, "Bombers", which like the first single did not chart. The two singles were released again as a gatefold doublepack in 1979, and in 1983 a re-release of "That's Too Bad" reached No. 97 on the UK singles chart.

Tubeway Army's eponymous, new wave-oriented debut studio album, released in November 1978, sold out its limited run and introduced Numan's fascination with dystopian science fiction and synthesizers. During the recording of the album Numan found a Moog synthesizer left behind in the studio and the transition towards an electronic sound began. Though the band's third single, the dark-themed and slow-paced "Down in the Park" (1979), did not appear on the charts, it became one of Numan's most enduring and oft-covered songs. It was featured with other contemporary hits on the soundtrack for the American drama film Times Square (1980), and a live version of the song appeared in the British concert film Urgh! A Music War (1982). Following exposure in a television advertisement for Lee Cooper jeans with the jingle "Don't Be a Dummy", Tubeway Army released the single "Are 'Friends' Electric?" in May 1979. After a modest start at the lower reaches of the UK singles chart at No. 71, it steadily climbed to No. 1 at the end of June and remained on that position for four consecutive weeks. In July its parent studio album Replicas also reached No. 1 on the albums chart.

At this point Numan was recording his next studio album with a new backing band, having recruited keyboardist Chris Payne and drummer Cedric Sharpley. At the peak of success, Numan opted to premiere four songs in a John Peel session in June 1979 rather than promoting the current album and the Tubeway Army group name was dropped.

In September "Cars" reached No. 1 in the UK. The single found success in North American charts where "Cars" spent 2 weeks at No. 1 on the Canadian RPM charts, and reached No. 9 in the US in 1980. "Cars" and the 1979 studio album The Pleasure Principle were both released under Numan's own stage name. The album reached No. 1 in the UK, and a sell-out tour (The Touring Principle) followed; the concert video it spawned is often cited as the first full-length commercial music video release. The Pleasure Principle was a rock album with no guitars; instead, Numan used synthesizers connected to effects units to achieve a distorted, phased, metallic tone. A second single from the album, "Complex", made it to No. 6 on the UK singles chart.

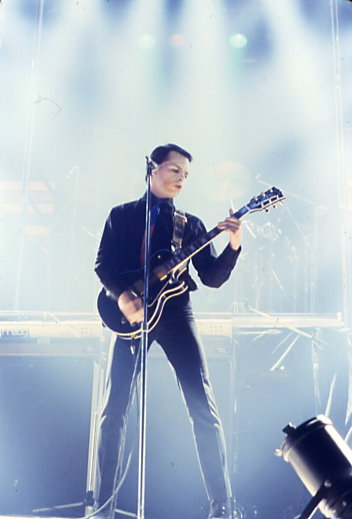
Numan performing in 1980

In 1980, Numan topped the UK Albums Chart for a third time with Telekon, and the singles "We Are Glass" and "I Die: You Die", released prior to the album, reaching No. 5 and No. 6 on the UK charts. "This Wreckage", the only single taken from the original album release, entered the UK top 20 in December that year. Telekon, the final studio album that Numan retrospectively termed the "Machine" section of his career, reintroduced guitars to Numan's music and featured a wider range of synthesizers. The same year he embarked on his second major tour ("The Teletour") with a more elaborate stage show than The Touring Principle the previous year. In April 1981, Numan decided to retire from touring following his upcoming series of concerts at Wembley Arena, where he was supported by the Canadian experimental musician Nash the Slash and Shock, a rock/mime/burlesque troupe whose members included Barbie Wilde, Tik and Tok, and Carole Caplin. Living Ornaments '79 and '80, a live two album boxed set from the 1979 and 1980 tours, was released at this time, reaching No. 2 in the UK charts. Both albums, also individually released as Living Ornaments '79 and Living Ornaments '80 also charted. The decision to retire would be short-lived.

=== 1981–1983: New musical directions ===
Departing from the pure electropop that he had been associated with, Numan began experimenting with jazz, funk, and ethereal, rhythmic pop. His first studio album after his farewell concerts was Dance (1981). The album charted at No. 3 on the UK charts, with an eight-week chart run and produced one hit single ("She's Got Claws"), which reached No. 6. The album featured several distinguished guest players; Mick Karn (bass guitar; saxophone) and Rob Dean (guitar) of Japan, Roger Mason (keyboards) of Models, and Roger Taylor (drums) of Queen.

With his former backing band, Chris Payne (keyboards; viola), Russell Bell (guitar), and Ced Sharpley (drums) now reformed as the synth-pop band Dramatis, Numan contributed lead vocals to the minor hit "Love Needs No Disguise" from the studio album For Future Reference (1981) and lent lead vocals to the first single released by his long-term bassist Paul Gardiner, "Stormtrooper in Drag", which also made the charts. However, Numan's success began to wane as he was outsold by the Human League, Duran Duran, Depeche Mode, and his prior support act, Orchestral Manoeuvres in the Dark (OMD). With each new studio album, Numan would take on a particular persona, but none seemed to catch audiences' attention like he had been able to in 1979.

Numan's fourth solo studio album I, Assassin (1982) produced the top 10 hit "We Take Mystery (To Bed)", as well as the top 20 singles "Music for Chameleons" and "White Boys and Heroes", the album peaking at No. 8 with a six-week chart run. The heavily percussive funk style made several tracks from the album, such as the 12" version of "Music for Chameleons" and a special remix of "White Boys and Heroes", unexpected successes in the American club scene and in October 1982 he embarked on a US tour.

Warriors (1983) further developed Numan's jazz-influenced style and featured contributions from avant-garde musician Bill Nelson of Be-Bop Deluxe (who fell out with Numan during recording and chose to be uncredited as the album's co-producer), and saxophonist Dick Morrissey (who also performed on The Fury, Strange Charm and Outland). The album peaked at No. 12, produced two hit singles including the top 20 title-track and, like I, Assassin, spent six weeks in the charts. Warriors was the last album Numan recorded for Beggars Banquet Records, and was supported by a 40-date UK tour (again with support from robotic mime and music duo Tik and Tok).

=== 1984–1993: Record label foundation, collaborations, and career downturn ===
Numan subsequently issued a series of albums and singles on his own record label, Numa Records. The first studio album released, 1984's Berserker, was Numan's first foray into music computers and samplers (in this case, the PPG Wave). The album was accompanied by a new, blue-and-white colour scheme and visual (including Numan himself, with blue hair), as well as a tour, a live album, video, extended play (EP), and the title track as a single. The track charted within the UK top 40. Despite this, the album divided critics and fans, and ultimately performed poorly, stalling at No. 32 on the UK chart. Numan cites many reasons for this, including distribution issues.

A collaboration with Bill Sharpe (of Shakatak) as Sharpe & Numan, in 1985, was more successful; in March of that year, the single "Change Your Mind" reached No. 17 on the UK singles chart. A few months later, the live album White Noise (recorded during the Berserker Tour) and a live EP with tracks taken from it (titled The Live EP) reached No. 29 and 27 on the charts, respectively.

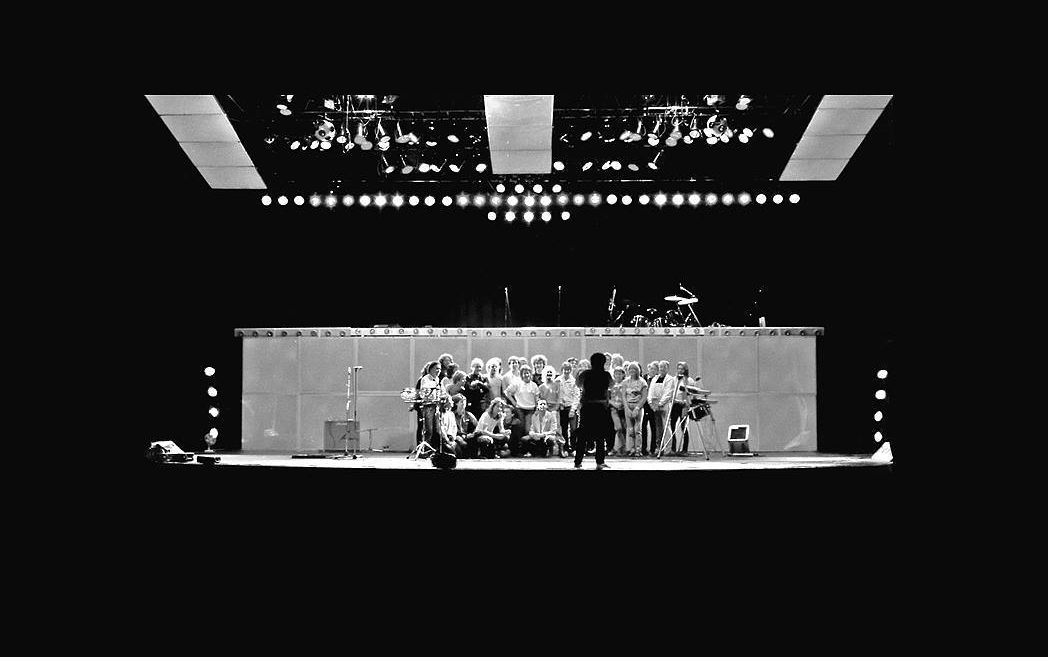
Andre Csillag taking group photos of the band for the Official Fury Tour book; Manchester Apollo, 1985

Numan's next studio album, The Fury (1985), charted slightly higher than Berserker, breaking the top 30. Again, the album heralded a change of image, this time featuring Numan in a white suit and red bow tie. However, for the first time in his career, none of the three initial singles released from the album ("Your Fascination", "Call Out the Dogs" and "Miracles") managed to reach the top 40, barely entering the top 50 on the UK charts.

The following year, Numan scored two top-30 UK singles, with "This Is Love" in April 1986, and "I Can't Stop" in June that year; the subsequent studio album, Strange Charm, was released later that year, but only spent two weeks on the albums chart, where it peaked at No. 59. In November of that year, a version of the song "I Still Remember", from the previous studio album, was released as a charity single, but stalled at No. 74 on the singles chart.

Further collaborations with Bill Sharpe spawned two more Sharpe & Numan hits with "New Thing from London Town", peaking at No. 52 in 1986, and "No More Lies" at No. 35 in 1988. In 1987, Numan performed lead vocals for three singles by Radio Heart, a project of brothers Hugh and David Nicholson (formerly of Marmalade and Blue), which charted with varying success ("Radio Heart", No. 35, "London Times", No. 48; "All Across the Nation", No. 81 in the UK). A studio album was also released, credited to "Radio Heart featuring Gary Numan", with Numan only appearing on three tracks; the record failed to chart. Also in 1987, Numan's old label, Beggars Banquet, released the double disc compilation album Exhibition, which reached No. 43 on the UK Albums Chart, and a remix of "Cars". The remix, titled "Cars (E Reg Model)", charted at No. 16, marking Numan's final Top 20 hit (until the same song was re-released in 1996).

Numa Records, which had been launched during a flurry of idealistic excitement, folded after the release of Numan's eighth solo studio album Strange Charm (1986). Numan would reopen the record label in 1992, yet it was again shuttered in 1996. In addition to Numa Records' commercial failure, Numan's own amassed fortune (since the late 1970s), which he estimated to be around £4.5 million, was drained. He then signed a recording contract with I.R.S. Records for the release of his final studio album of the 1980s, Metal Rhythm (1988), which also sold relatively poorly. For its American release, the record label edited the album's title to New Anger after the lead single's title, and also changed the album cover's colour from black to blue and remixed several of its tracks, against Numan's wishes.

In 1989, Sharpe & Numan's sole studio album Automatic was released through Polydor Records, though this too failed to garner much commercial success, briefly entering the charts for just one week at No. 59, eleven spots lower than Metal Rhythm, which had been released nine months prior. "I'm on Automatic" was the only single to be released from Automatic; it reached No. 44 on the UK singles chart. Its disappointing sales led to plans for a second Sharpe + Numan studio album being abandoned.

In 1991, Numan ventured into film-scoring by co-composing the music for the American science fiction horror film The Unborn with Michael R. Smith (the score was later released as the 1995 album Human). After Outland (1991), another critical and commercial disappointment and his second and last studio album with I.R.S., Numan reactivated Numa Records, under which he would release his next two studio albums. His first Numa Records release, Machine + Soul (1992), is considered by many, including Numan himself, to be a career low point, released primarily to pay off debt. After the poor reception of the album, Numan considered leaving the music industry entirely. In 1993, he released a single "Cars ('93 Sprint)", a techno remix of "Cars". That same year, he supported OMD (who had opened for him in 1979) on their concert tour.

=== 1994–2001: New musical direction and critical acclaim ===
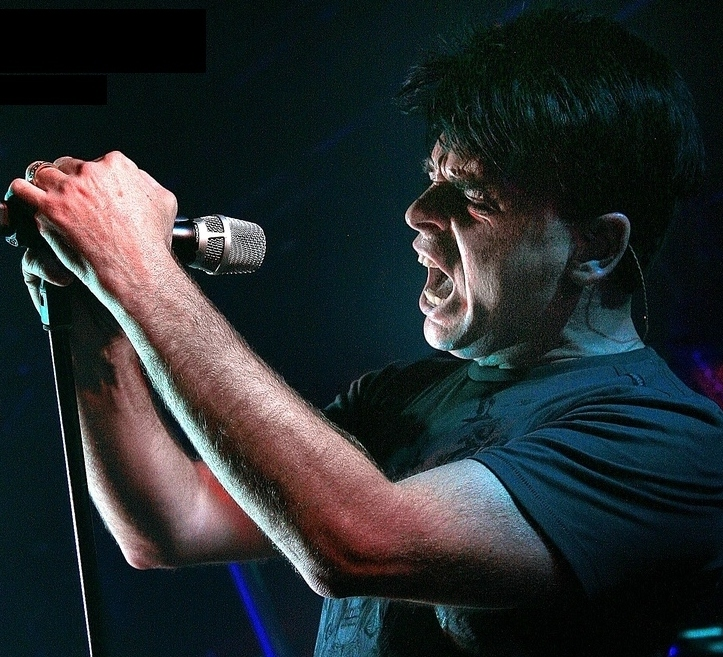
Numan performing in 2007

By 1994, Numan decided to stop attempting to crack the pop market and concentrate instead on exploring more personal themes, including his vocal atheism further (these themes had occasionally been explored on previous studio albums). His future wife Gemma encouraged him to strip away the influences of the more recent years. Numan thus sought a grittier, more industrial tone for his songwriting on his twelfth solo studio album Sacrifice, on which, for the first time, he played almost all the instruments himself. Nine Inch Nails (NIN), who were influenced by Numan's music, and other bands with industrial tendencies were contemporaneously becoming famous, and Sacrifice received critical acclaim. According to Numan, the influence was mutual. He cites 1994's "Closer" as his favourite Nine Inch Nails song, and has said that 1989's "Head Like a Hole" has "the best chorus ever". Depeche Mode's eighth studio album Songs of Faith and Devotion (1993) that came out during the recording of Sacrifice became a massive influence on Numan that both musically and lyrically inspired his new, darker direction.

Sacrifice was the final studio album that Numan made before shutting down Numa Records permanently. His next two studio albums, Exile (1997) and Pure (2000), were well received and significantly helped to restore his critical reputation, as did the double-CD tribute album dedicated to Numan, Random (1997). Random was released shortly before Exile and featured artists, such as Blur's Damon Albarn, EMF, Jesus Jones, the Orb, Moloko and Pop Will Eat Itself, who had been influenced by Numan. Numan toured the US in support of Exile, his first stateside concerts since the early 1980s.

=== 2002–2008: Further works and return to chart success ===
In 2002, Numan enjoyed chart success once again with the single "Rip", reaching No. 29 on the UK singles chart, and again in 2003 with the Gary Numan vs Rico single "Crazier", which reached No. 13 in the UK charts. Rico also worked on the 2003 remix album Hybrid which featured reworkings of older songs in a more contemporary industrial style as well as new material. Other artists and producers who contributed on these remixes included Curve, Flood, Andy Gray, Alan Moulder, New Disease, and Sulpher. 2003 saw Numan performing the lead vocals on "Pray for You", the single from Plump DJs' second studio album Eargasm, which reached No. 89 on the UK Top 100 Chart. In 2005, Numan took control of his own business affairs again with the launch of his recording label, Mortal Records.

On 13 March 2006, Numan's fifteenth solo studio album, Jagged, was released. An album launch gig took place at The Forum in Kentish Town, London on 18 March followed by UK, European and US tours in support of the release. Numan also launched a Jagged website to showcase the album, and made plans to have his 1981 farewell concert (previously released as Micromusic on VHS) issued on DVD by November 2006 as well as releasing the DVD version of the Jagged album launch gig. Numan undertook a brief Telekon 'Classic Album' tour in the UK in December 2006, performing at Rock City, the Kentish Town Forum and Club Academy.

Numan contributed lead vocals to four tracks on the April 2007 release of the debut solo studio album by Ade Fenton, Artificial Perfect, on his new industrial and electronic label, Submission, including "The Leather Sea", "Slide Away", "Recall", and the first single to be taken from the album, "Healing". The second single to be released in the UK was "The Leather Sea" on 30 July 2007, which charted.

He sold out a 15-date UK and Ireland tour in spring 2008, during which he performed his 1979 number-one studio album Replicas in its entirety, and all the Replicas-era music including B-sides. The successful tour reflected the resurging popularity of electropop in the UK and coincided with his 50th birthday and 30th anniversary of the original release of Replicas.

In November 2007, Numan confirmed via his website that work on a new studio album, with the working title of Splinter, would be under way throughout 2008, after finishing an alternate version of Jagged (called Jagged Edge) and the CD of unreleased songs from his previous three studio albums (released in 2011 as Dead Son Rising). Numan released his subsequent album, Splinter (Songs from a Broken Mind), in 2013.

=== 2009–2019 ===
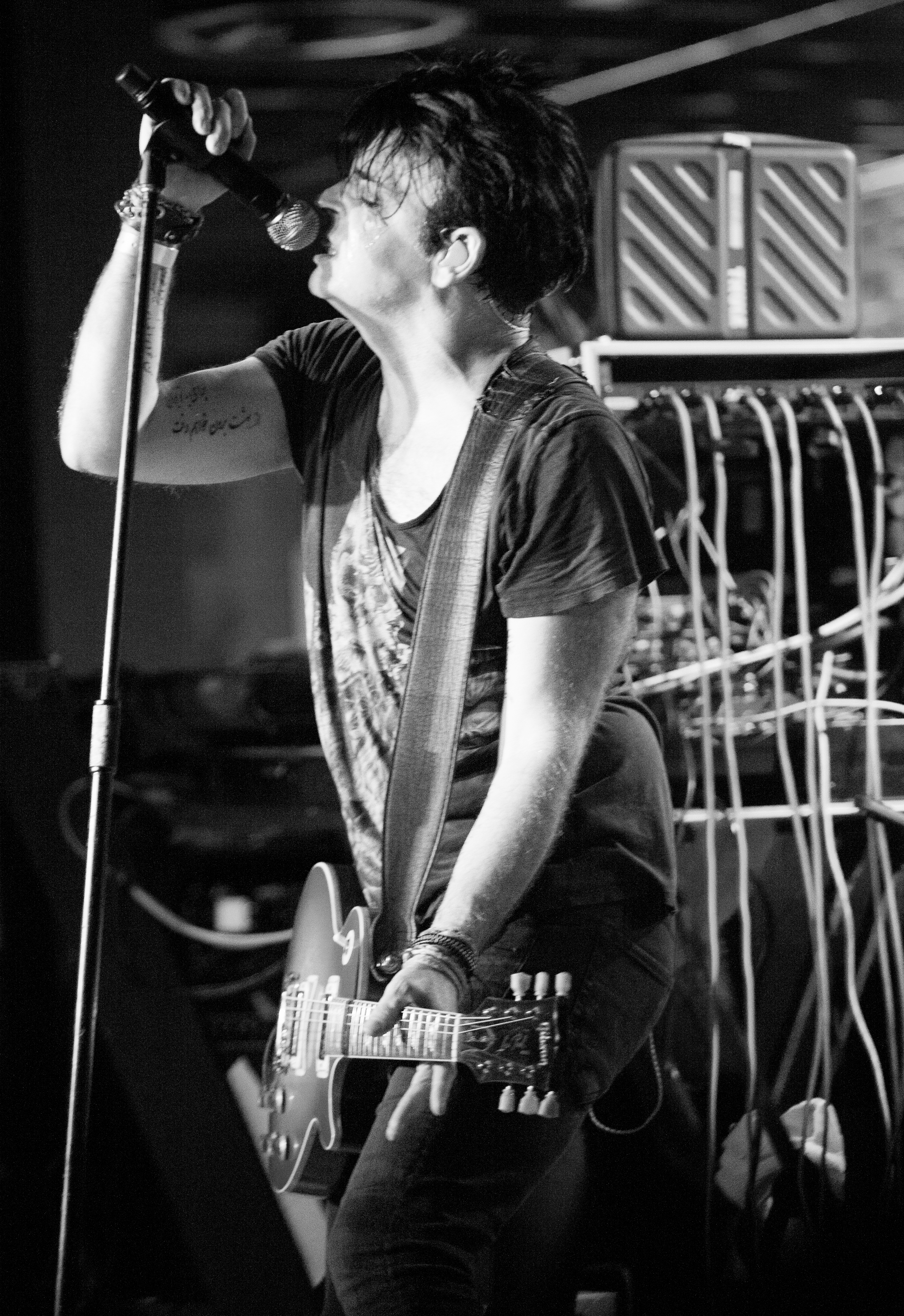
Numan performing at South by Southwest (SXSW) in Austin, Texas, 2014

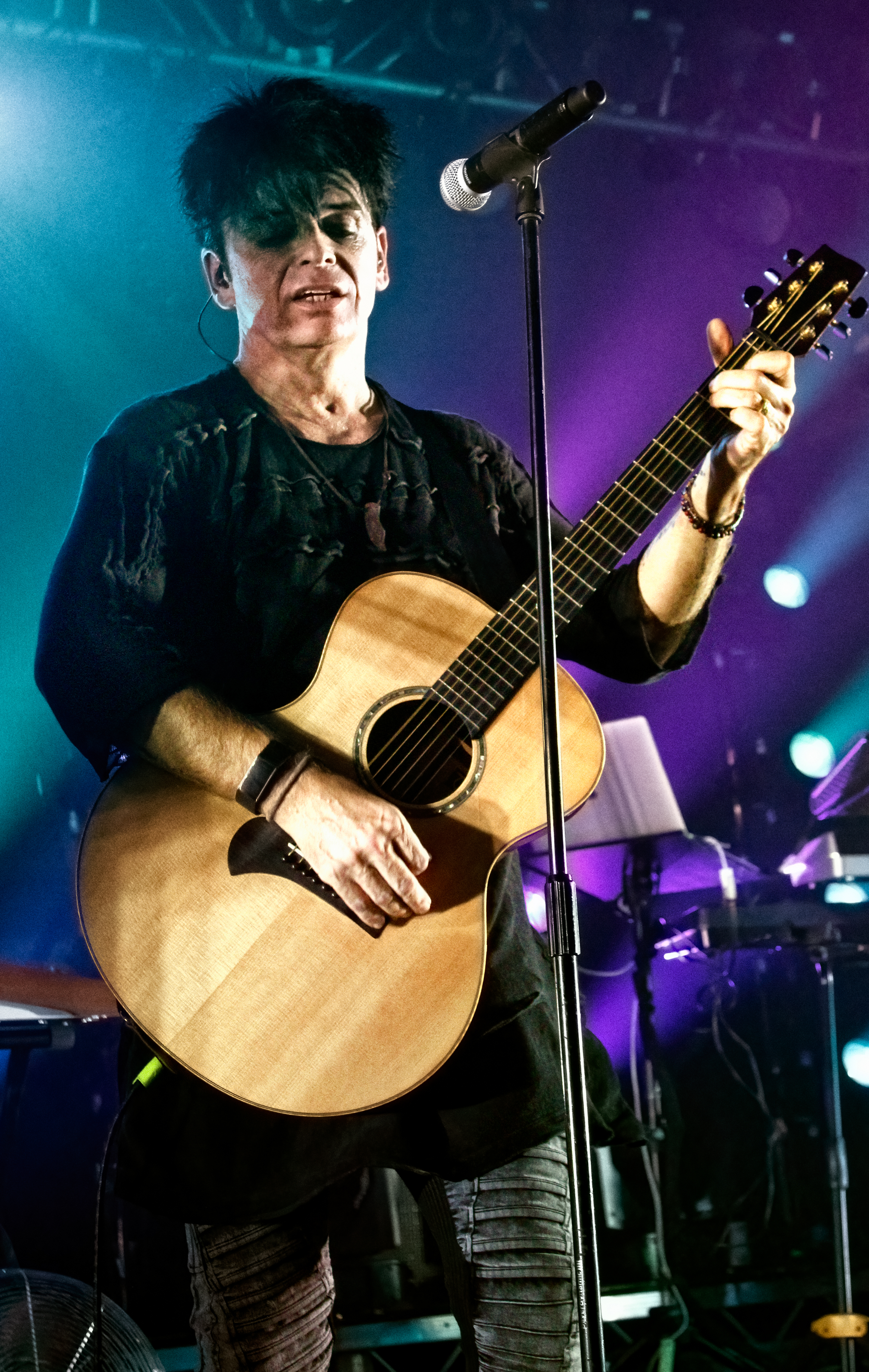
Numan performing at Cardiff Tramshed, 3 October 2019

Numan was set to perform a small number of American live dates in April 2010, including a Coachella festival appearance in Indio, California, but had to cancel because air travel in Europe was halted by the Icelandic volcanic ash cloud. As a result, the tour was not only postponed but expanded, and his Pleasure Principle 30th Anniversary Tour's American and Mexican dates began on 17 October 2010, at Firestone Live in Orlando, Florida.

Numan toured Australia in May 2011 performing his studio album The Pleasure Principle in its entirety to celebrate its thirtieth anniversary. Joining him on tour was Australian electronic band Severed Heads, coming out of retirement especially for the shows.

Numan lent his vocals to the track "My Machines" on the American experimental rock band Battles's second studio album Gloss Drop (2011). He was chosen by Battles to perform at the ATP Nightmare Before Christmas festival that they co-curated in December 2011 in Minehead, England. Numan's sixteenth solo studio album Dead Son Rising was released on 16 September 2011, which had a full UK tour split in two-halves, 15–21 September and 7–11 December. Both parts were supported by Welsh solo artist Jayce Lewis; in an interview during the tour Numan said Lewis was "one of the most popular" support acts he had toured with. Numan later published some of his tour diary online.

Numan provided narration for Cuban-American musician Aurelio Voltaire's fifth short film in his ChimeraScope series, Odokuro in 2011, which won 12 awards and was shown as a selection at numerous film festivals between 2011 and 2013.

In 2012, Numan collaborated with Officers on the track Petals to raise awareness for the suicide prevention charity CALM (Campaign Against Living Miserably). Two music videos were made to support the release. Officers also joined Numan on his Machine Music (in May and June 2012) and The Dead Moon Falling (late 2012) tours.

Numan's seventeenth solo studio album Splinter (Songs from a Broken Mind), was released on 14 October 2013. It reached the UK Top 20, his first album to do so for 30 years. It was promoted by an extensive US, Canada, UK and Ireland tour which continued in 2014 to include Israel, New Zealand, Australia and Europe. A further US leg took place in late 2014.

In June 2014, Numan collaborated with Jayce Lewis on the track "Redesign" which originally featured on Lewis's Protafield studio album Nemesis The same album was re-released as a Special Edition under Lewis's solo name in 2018. Numan provided lead vocals for the song "Long Way Down", composed by Masafumi Takada with lyrics written by Rich Dickerson, for the survival horror video game The Evil Within, which was released on 14 October 2014. Numan performed a sold-out, one-off live show in London in November 2014 at the Hammersmith Apollo supported by the English post-punk band Gang of Four.

Numan collaborated with the industrial pop band VOWWS for "Losing Myself in You" on their debut studio album The Great Sun.

On 6 May 2016, Numan was one of several collaborators on Jean-Michel Jarre's eighteenth studio album Electronica 2: The Heart of Noise, with the track "Here for You", co-written by Jarre and Numan.

On 10 May 2016, Numan was named the recipient of the 2016 Moog Innovation Award by Moog Music. On 18 May 2017, Numan received an Ivor Novello Inspiration Award from the British Academy of Songwriters, Composers, and Authors.

In 2017, Numan released the single "My Name Is Ruin" and went on a European tour September. Numan's eighteenth solo studio album Savage (Songs from a Broken World) was released on 15 September and charted at number two in the UK. He was the winner of the 2017 T3 tech legends award.

On 24 September 2018, Numan's tour bus hit and killed an elderly man in Cleveland, Ohio, US. The driver was not immediately charged. Numan was scheduled to appear at the Cleveland House of Blues that evening but cancelled the show for being "inappropriate" in light of the day's tragedy.

=== 2020–present ===
Numan's nineteenth solo studio album Intruder was released on 21 May 2021. The title track was released earlier, on 11 January 2021. Numan discussed its genesis with writer Guy Mankowski, who has a chapter on Numan's legacy in his book Albion's Secret History: Snapshots of England's Pop Rebels and Outsiders, as part of an interview series on influential English artists for Zer0 Books.

Following his US Intruder tour in late 2021 and early 2022, Numan began a 17-venue UK and Ireland tour between April and May 2022.

Numan performed at the Cruel World Festival in Pasadena, California on 20 May 2023. After a nearby lightning storm led to an early evacuation, truncating Iggy Pop's set and cancelling Siouxsie Sioux's headlining set entirely, a second show was quickly announced for the following day, with Siouxsie, Pop and Numan returning.

In October 2023, Numan performed a series of eight acoustic gigs, playing songs from his repertoire in a new way in smaller, intimate settings. Locations included Wylam Brewery, Newcastle upon Tyne, Manchester Cathedral, and Church of St John-at-Hackney in London.

In February 2024, Numan announced a UK tour to celebrate the 45th anniversary of his 1979 studio albums Replicas and The Pleasure Principle. Including shows in Norwich, Sheffield, Glasgow, Newcastle upon Tyne, Manchester, London, Bristol, Cardiff, Bournemouth, Birmingham and Nottingham between 19 May and 1 June.

In March 2025, he was featured on lead vocals on a track called "Polished Chrome (The Friend Pt. 1)" on a new studio album released by the German techno DJ Chris Liebing.

On 28 June 2025 Numan made his debut at the Glastonbury Festival, playing the Park Stage.

== Artistry ==
In the late 1970s, Numan began developing his style. According to Numan, this was an unintentional result of acne; before an appearance on Top of the Pops (TOTP), "I had spots everywhere, so they slapped about half an inch of white make-up on me before I'd even walked in the door. And my eyes were like pissholes in the snow, so they put black on there. My so-called image fell into place an hour before going on the show." His previously "wooden" stage presence was, in his words, a result of "incredible self-consciousness" and "incompetence – I didn't know to move on stage". He became enamoured by the idea of "being cold about everything, not letting emotions get to you, or presenting a front of not feeling", though his stage presence later became more intense and extroverted.

Initially, Numan used his invention of the mysterious fantasy character "Mach-man", a machine in human skin dressed all in black, which developed from short stories he wrote at school, as his stage persona. But this image was replaced in 1981 by a totally different "gangster"-look inspired by a television programme on 1930s eccentric millionaire Howard Hughes.

Later in the 1980s, Numan adopted a new visual image for each new studio album, such as the Mad Max-influenced image for Warriors (1983), the white-skinned, white-clad "Iceman" with blue hair and make-up for the Berserker (1984) album and tour, the white suit and red bow-tie image for The Fury (1985), and a Blade Runner (1982)-influenced image for Strange Charm (1986).

A prolific songwriter, Numan has as of 2021 written about 400 songs. His starting point is usually a piano to work out melodies and chord structures. Most of the songs on his early albums were written on a piano his parents had bought him: later in his career he has used a piano preset on the computer as a starting point. However, his biggest hit "Cars" was unconventionally written on a bass guitar.

Numan's recognisable vocals have become one of his trademarks, along with his androgynous "android" stage persona.

=== Musical style and influences ===
Numan's music has been described as synth-pop, new wave, electronica, gothic rock, post-punk, industrial rock, dark wave, industrial, electropop, and electronic rock. In a 2012 interview, Numan spoke about the music that has had an influence on him over the years. As a teenager he was fan of T. Rex, David Bowie and Queen. His band Tubeway Army started in the punk rock-vein in 1977, but Numan later said that the punk rock style was adopted with the sole intention to obtain a recording contract. Ultravox's third studio album Systems of Romance (1978) was the main influence behind Tubeway Army's transition into an electronic sound. Numan cited the album, and particularly the song "Slow Motion", as the blueprint for what he wanted to achieve. Moving away from the commercially successful synth-pop on the 1979 studio albums Replicas and The Pleasure Principle to a more introspective and partly ambient sound, David Bowie's collaborations with Brian Eno, the new wave band Japan and Lou Reed's third solo studio album Berlin (1973) has been cited as some of the influences that informed Numan's third solo studio album Dance (1981). At this point, jazz and funk influences became prominent in Numan's music, as on the single "She's Got Claws" and his fourth solo studio album I, Assassin (1982). His fifth solo studio album Warriors (1983) started as a collaboration with Bill Nelson, guitarist in Be-Bop Deluxe, which was another of Numan's favourite bands in the 1970s. Adopting a heavier, more aggressive sound, the production of his sixth solo studio album Berserker (1984) took influence from Trevor Horn's production of Frankie Goes to Hollywood. Wanting to broaden his musical output, Numan's mid- to late 1980's releases featured a jazz-funk style, blending an industrial edge with funk and synth-pop sensibilities. Following the release of two commercially and critically unsuccessful pop and funk influenced studio albums in the early 1990s, Numan found new pivotal influences in Nine Inch Nails (NIN) and Depeche Mode's eighth studio album Songs of Faith and Devotion (1993) that inspired him to move into a darker sound that became the trademark of his later career.

== Legacy ==
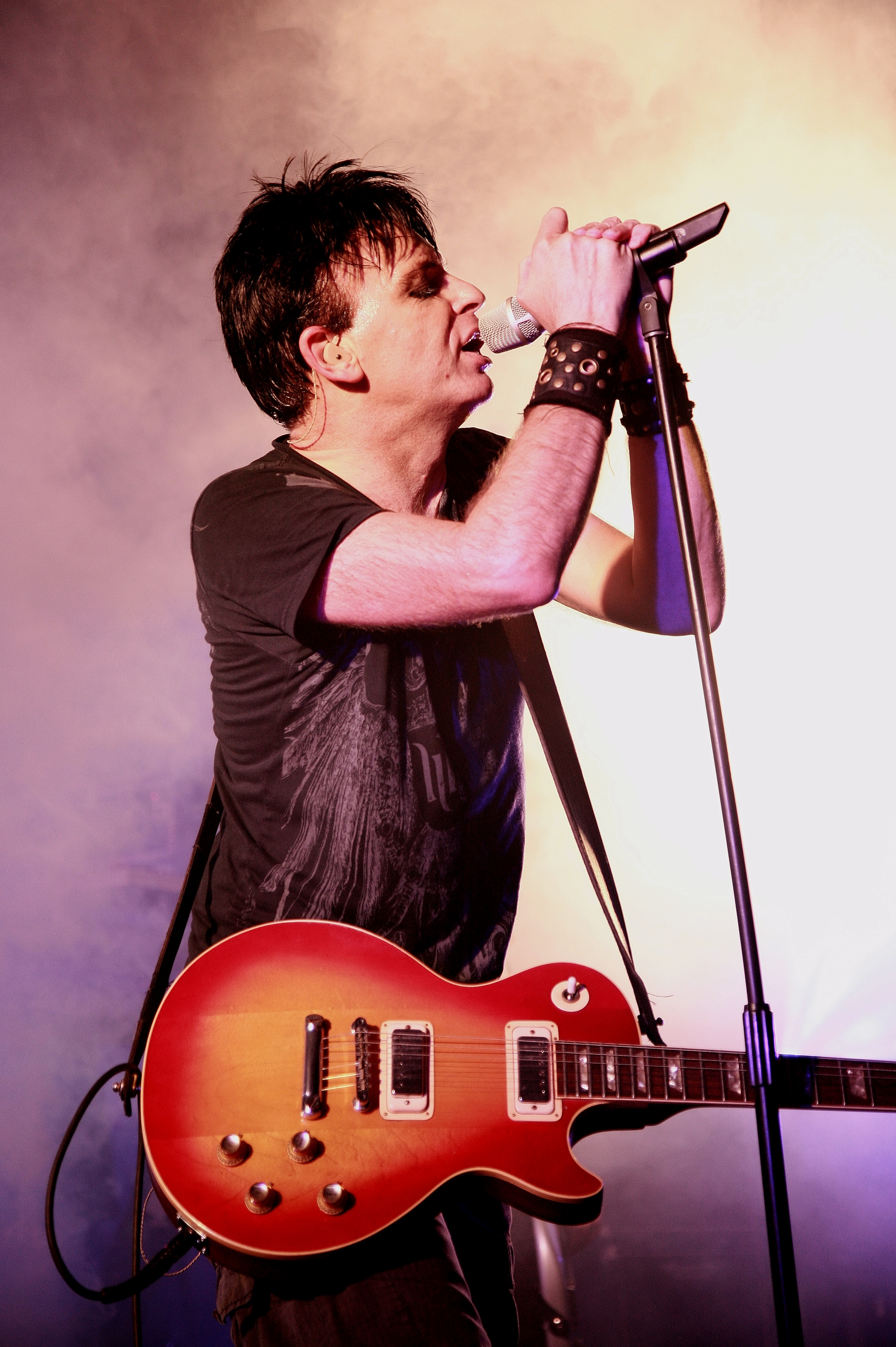
Numan performing as part of his 2009 tour of Australia

Within the UK's burgeoning synth-pop scene, Numan was the first artist to achieve mainstream renown. His music and live performances met with censure from critics; he also faced condemnation from the Musicians' Union (MU), who said he was putting "proper" musicians out of work. Andy McCluskey of OMD observed "nasty, vitriolic journalism" directed at Numan, who was dismissed as "pretentious" and "pseudo-intellectual". He nevertheless generated an army of fans calling themselves "Numanoids", providing him with a fanbase which maintained their support through the latter half of the 1980s, when his fortunes began to fall. He maintains a cult following and has sold over 10 million records.

Numan is considered a pioneer of electronic music; Nightshift identified Numan, and fellow late 1970s debutants OMD and the Human League, as "the holy trinity of synth-pop". He has been credited as a key influence by fellow English musician Kim Wilde as she was working on her 1981 debut single "Kids in America" with her brother Ricky. Curt Smith and Roland Orzabal of Tears for Fears, another new wave act of the 1980s, cited Numan's style as one that inspired them while recording their debut studio album The Hurting (1983). Since the 1990s Numan has been cited as a major influence by a variety of bands and artists from hip-hop to industrial rock and Britpop, including Afrika Bambaataa, Fear Factory, Nine Inch Nails, Marilyn Manson, Stephin Merritt of the Magnetic Fields and Damon Albarn of Blur. Prince was quoted saying: "There are still people trying to work out what a genius Gary Numan is."

The American industrial metal band Fear Factory produced a cover version of "Cars" (featuring a prominent guest appearance by Numan himself) for the digipak version of their third studio album, Obsolete (1999). Numan had become acknowledged and respected by his peers, with such musicians as Dave Grohl (of the Foo Fighters and Nirvana), with whom he covered "Down in the Park" on the compilation album Songs in the Key of X: Music from and Inspired by the X-Files (1996), Trent Reznor (of Nine Inch Nails, whose 2018 leg of the Cold and Black and Infinite tour concluded with a guest performance by Numan, who Reznor described as "vitally important and a huge inspiration"), and Marilyn Manson (who released his own cover version of "Down in the Park" as the B-side of his band's 1995 single Lunchbox) proclaiming his work an influence.

The English electronic music duo Basement Jaxx had a hit in 2002 with "Where's Your Head At", which relied on a sample of Numan's "M.E."—from The Pleasure Principle—for its hook. Nine Inch Nails covered the song "Metal" on The Fragile (1999) remix album Things Falling Apart (2000), as did Afrika Bambaataa (with Numan himself) on the studio album Dark Matter Moving at the Speed of Light. "Cars" remains Numan's most enduring song; it was a hit again in 1987 (remixed by Zeus B. Held) and 1996, in the latter case thanks to an appearance in an advert for Carling beer. In 2000, the American DJ Armand van Helden sampled the track in his single "Koochy". In 2002, the English girl group the Sugababes scored a No. 1 with "Freak Like Me", a mashup of Adina Howard's "Freak Like Me" and "Are 'Friends' Electric?" by Numan's Tubeway Army.

== Personal life ==
From early in his career Numan was very close to his family. His father Tony was his manager for many years, his musician brother John became a member of his backing band and his mother Beryl was also frequently involved doing various things behind the scenes, such as running Numan's fan club and managing the reception at his Rock City studio.

In 1997, Numan married Gemma O'Neill, a member of his fan club from Sidcup, south-east London. They have three daughters. One daughter, at the age of 11, wrote a piano part and main melody for a Numan track and contributed vocals to Numan's 2017 song "My Name Is Ruin" and appeared in its music video. Numan and his family lived in Essex, then Heathfield and Waldron in East Sussex, and in October 2012 moved to Santa Monica, California, US.

At age 15, after a series of outbursts in which he would "smash things up, scream and shout, get in people's faces and break stuff", Numan was prescribed antidepressants and anxiolytics. In the 1990s, his wife suggested he had Asperger syndrome; after reading about the syndrome and taking a series of online tests, he agreed. It was discussed when he was younger, though he was not confident in the diagnostic criteria of the time. Conversely, he said in an April 2018 interview with The Guardian that he had been diagnosed with Asperger syndrome at the age of 14. In a 2001 interview, he said, "Polite conversation has never been one of my strong points. Just recently I actually found out that I'd got a mild form of Asperger's syndrome which basically means I have trouble interacting with people. For years, I couldn't understand why people thought I was arrogant, but now it all makes more sense."

Numan published his autobiography, Praying to the Aliens, in 1997 (updated in 1998), in collaboration with Steve Malins, who also wrote the liner notes for most of the CD reissues of Numan's albums in the late 1990s, as well as executive producing the Hybrid album in 2003. An updated autobiography, (R)evolution: The Autobiography, was published on 22 October 2020 and brings his career up to date from the earlier Praying to the Aliens.

Numan is an atheist.

He was an outspoken supporter of the Conservative Party and Margaret Thatcher after her election as Prime Minister. He later expressed regret for giving his public support, calling it "a noose around my neck". He has previously said that he considers himself neither left- nor right-wing and that he did not support Tony Blair or David Cameron. He also said, "I'm not socialist, I know that. I don't believe in sharing my money." Numan is not overly politically engaged and distances himself from political commentary.

== Aviation career ==
Numan joined the Air Training Corps as a teenager, when he wanted to be either a pilot or a pop star. In 1978, he started learning to fly at Blackbushe Airport, but the success of his music career in 1979 meant that obtaining his pilot's licence was delayed until 17 December 1980. The following day; 18 December 1980, Numan bought his first aeroplane for £12,000; a Cessna 182 Skylane. On 1 July 1981, Numan founded Numanair, a small charter flight company operating from Blackbushe, and acquired a Cessna 210 Centurion (registered G-OILS) and a Piper PA-31 Navajo (registered G-NMAN). He also indulged his passion for motor racing in 1981 by sponsoring Mike Mackonochie who drove a Van Diemen RF81 in Numanair livery in the Formula Ford 1600 class.

In November and December 1981, Numan successfully flew around the world in his Piper PA-31 Navajo with co-pilot Bob Thompson on their second attempt. The first attempt, in the Cessna 210 Centurion, had ended in India with Numan and Thompson being arrested on suspicion of smuggling and spying. This aircraft was written off on 29 January 1982 when it ran out of fuel near Southampton and made a forced landing while Numan was a passenger.

In 1984, Numan bought a Harvard T-6 trainer aircraft registered G-AZSC and had the aircraft painted to resemble a Japanese "Zero" fighter. He also gained a display pilot's licence and flew the machine on the UK air display circuit. He and friend Norman Lees, who also owned a Harvard, formed the Radial Pair, performing synchronised aerobatics from the 1992 air display season. Later they teamed up with other Harvard owners to fly up to five aircraft as the Harvard Formation Team with Numan choreographing their aerobatic routines.

Numan held licences for piston and turbine helicopters and had a fixed wing multi engined rating. He was an aerobatic flying instructor and was appointed by the Civil Aviation Authority (CAA) as an air display pilot evaluator. Then in 2005, after several of his friends and colleagues were killed in unrelated flying accidents, he gave up flying. In an interview in 2009, he said, "I loved going to air shows, you'd bond really tightly with your team mates – it's an extreme thing to be doing, and you trust your life to them. And then it ended. I'd turn up and not know anyone. It got depressing. I'd sit down in the pilot's tent and there'd be all these people I'd not recognise. You'd look forward to someone turning up to have a chat with them, and they'd be dead."

Numanair continued operating but after 31 years, with Numan and his family emigrating to the US, it was dissolved on 18 June 2013.

== Discography ==
Tubeway Army

- Tubeway Army (1978)
- Replicas (1979)

Solo

- The Pleasure Principle (1979)
- Telekon (1980)
- Dance (1981)
- I, Assassin (1982)
- Warriors (1983)
- Berserker (1984)
- The Fury (1985)
- Strange Charm (1986)
- Metal Rhythm (1988) (New Anger in the US)
- Automatic (1989) (with Bill Sharpe as Sharpe & Numan)
- Outland (1991)
- Machine + Soul (1992)
- Sacrifice (1994) (Dawn in the US)
- Exile (1997)
- Pure (2000)
- Jagged (2006)
- Dead Son Rising (2011)
- Splinter (Songs from a Broken Mind) (2013)
- Savage (Songs from a Broken World) (2017)
- Intruder (2021)

== See also ==
- List of one-hit wonders in the United States

== Bibliography ==
- Paul Goodwin (2004). Electric Pioneer: An Armchair Guide to Gary Numan, Helter Skelter Publishing, 2004, ISBN 978-1900924955
- The Guinness Book of British Hit Singles, 7th Edition, ISBN 0851123392
