= Tubeway Army =

English new wave band

- Tubeway Army's line-up for most of their recordings (L to R): Gary Numan, Jess Lidyard and Paul Gardiner

Background information
- Origin: London, England
- Genres: New wave; synth-pop; post-punk; punk rock (early)
- Years active: 1977–1979
- Label: Beggars Banquet
- Past members: Gary Numan; Paul Gardiner; Jess Lidyard; Bob Simmonds; Barry Benn; Sean Burke; Trevor Grant; Chris Payne; Cedric Sharpley; Paul Simons
- Website: garynuman.co.uk

Tubeway Army were a London-based new wave band led by lead singer Gary Numan. Formed at the height of punk rock in 1977, the band gradually changed to an electronic sound. They were the first band of the electronic era to have a synthesiser-based number-one hit, with their single "Are 'Friends' Electric?" and its parent album Replicas both topping the UK charts in mid-1979. After its release, Numan opted to drop the Tubeway Army name and release music under his own name as he was the sole songwriter, producer and public face of the band, but he retained the musicians from Tubeway Army as his backing band.

== History ==
=== Early years ===
Aged 18 years, Gary Webb had fronted London band Mean Street in 1976 (their song "Bunch of Stiffs" appeared on the Live at the Vortex compilation, and was the B-side of the Vortex 7-inch). After leaving this band, he auditioned as lead guitarist for another band called The Lasers, where he met bass-player Paul Gardiner. The Lasers soon became Tubeway Army, and were eventually reformed with Webb's uncle Jess Lidyard on drums. Webb renamed himself "Valerian", Gardiner "Scarlett", and Lidyard "Rael".

Webb was a prolific songwriter. The band began playing gigs on the punk scene in London and managed to secure a record deal with the independent Beggars Banquet label. In February 1978 the punk rock style debut single "That's Too Bad" was released, but failed to make much impact. Shortly after the band made demo recordings (later released as The Plan) to give Beggars Banquet an idea of the songs they had. In summer 1978 a second single, "Bombers"/"Blue Eyes"/"OD Receiver", was released, but failed to chart.

During this time the band went through some line-up changes, changing drummers and briefly adding a second guitarist, but due to musical differences Webb and Gardiner split with them as they wanted to move away from punk rock.

By this time Tubeway Army had decided to abandon live shows – Webb was unhappy with pub-venue gigs on the often violent London punk scene. Their last gig in July 1978 (sharing the bill with The Skids) was abandoned halfway through the set because of violence and Webb decided that Tubeway Army would become a studio-only band. (There are only 2 known recordings of Tubeway Army concerts – Live at the Roxy in 1977 and a London show from February 1978 – this was released as a bootleg album in the early 1980s. It was later officially included under the title Living Ornaments '78 as bonus tracks on the 1998 CD re-release of the Tubeway Army album).

=== Debut album ===
Soon afterwards, the Tubeway Army album was quickly recorded by the original line-up. At this point Webb adopted the name "Gary Numan", taking his new pseudonym from a local Yellow Pages where a plumber called "Arthur Neumann" was listed, the singer abandoning the German spelling, to become Numan. Whilst still largely guitar/bass/drums-based, the album saw his first tentative use of the Minimoog synthesizer, which he had come across by accident in the recording studio during the album sessions. Lyrically the record touched on dystopian and sci-fi themes similar to those employed by authors J. G. Ballard and Philip K. Dick, of whom Numan was a fan (the opening lines of the song "Listen to the Sirens" are a direct lift from the title of Dick's book Flow My Tears, The Policeman Said).

At this point Numan was keen to distance his music from punk rock and wanted to drop the Tubeway Army group name and release the album under his own stage name, but Beggars Banquet rejected the idea. The album was released with the title Tubeway Army on blue vinyl in November 1978. Whilst the album's modest initial pressing of 5000 copies sold out, it did not enter the album charts at that time, and no singles were lifted from it.

=== Replicas and commercial success ===
Following swiftly on, Numan took Tubeway Army back into the studio to record their follow-up album, Replicas and also a session for John Peel in early 1979. The result was more synth and science fiction oriented than the last album. The first single from the album, the bleak, slow-paced keyboard-driven song "Down in the Park" failed to chart, although it would prove an enduring cult track in the years to come.

The next single, "Are 'Friends' Electric?" was released in May 1979 and became the band's first entry on the UK Singles Chart. After a modest start at no. 71 it steadily climbed up the chart reaching the No. 1 spot in June. The underlying context of this song was also a reference to a Philip K. Dick novel, Do Androids Dream of Electric Sheep? A special picture disc helped boost sales but what particularly grabbed the British public's imagination was Tubeway Army's appearance on the BBC show The Old Grey Whistle Test, followed soon after by a slot on Top of the Pops on 24 May 1979. The band, now including Ultravox keyboardist Billy Currie, Chris Payne, Paul Gardiner and drummer Cedric Sharpley, appeared all dressed in black and near-motionless, Numan in particular giving a performance often referred to as being "like an android", a style that was later reported to have been a means of covering stage nerves but which then became his trademark. The single remained at number one in the UK charts for four weeks, with Replicas following suit in the album charts. By the end of 1979 "Are 'Friends' Electric?" had become the fourth highest selling single in the UK that year.

At the peak of success, a John Peel session in June 1979 was credited as Gary Numan, and the Tubeway Army group name was dropped. Numan would however keep the same musicians as his backing band on his subsequent solo releases and tours.

In 1981, following Numan's (temporary) retirement from live shows, his backing band of the time formed the synth-pop group Dramatis and released the album For Future Reference (1981) which featured Numan as guest vocalist on one track. The album was issued on CD in 2000 by Metrodome Group under the title The Dramatis Project and credited to "Tubeway Army featuring Gary Numan," but it is not a Tubeway Army album.

== Personnel ==
=== Members ===
- Gary Numan (a.k.a. "Valerian") – guitar, lead vocals, synthesizers (1977-1979)
- Paul Gardiner (a.k.a. "Scarlett") – bass, backing vocals (1977–1979; died 1984)
- Jess Lidyard (a.k.a. "Rael") – drums (1977, 1978–1979)
- Bob Simmonds – drums (1977–1978)
- Barry Benn – drums (1978)
- Sean Burke – guitar (1978)
- Billy Currie – synthesizers (1979)
- Trevor Grant – guitar (1979)
- Chris Payne – synthesizers (1979)
- Cedric Sharpley – drums (1979; died 2012)

=== Lineups ===
Years	Lineup	Albums
1977	Gary Numan – guitar, lead vocals; Paul Gardiner – bass, backing vocals; Jess Lidyard – drums	"That's Too Bad" (single) (1978)
1977–1978	Gary Numan – guitar, lead vocals; Paul Gardiner – bass, backing vocals; Bob Simmonds – drums
1978	Gary Numan – lead vocals, guitar; Paul Gardiner – bass, backing vocals; Sean Burke – guitar; Barry Benn – drums	"Bombers" (single) (1978)
1978–1979	Gary Numan – guitar, lead vocals, synthesizers; Paul Gardiner – bass, backing vocals; Jess Lidyard – drums	Tubeway Army (1978); Replicas (1979)
1979 (Old Grey Whistle Test and Top of the Pops performances)	Gary Numan – lead vocals, guitar, synthesizers; Paul Gardiner – bass, backing vocals; Trevor Grant – guitar; Billy Currie – synthesizers; Chris Payne – synthesizers; Cedric Sharpley – drums

== Discography ==
=== Studio albums ===
Year	Details	Peak chart positions					Certifications (sales thresholds)
Year	Details	UK	AUS	NZL	SWE	US	Certifications (sales thresholds)
1978	Tubeway Army: Released: 24 November 1978; Label: Beggars Banquet	14 (Note: The album Tubeway Army did not chart upon its first release in 1978, but following the success of Replicas, it charted in August 1979 and reached No. 14.)	—	—	—	—	
1979	Replicas: Released: 6 April 1979; Label: Beggars Banquet, Atco	1	11	8	37	124	UK: Gold
2009	Replicas Redux: Released September 2008; Label: Beggars Banquet	96	—	—	—	—	
"—" denotes releases that did not chart

=== Compilations ===
Year	Details	Peak chart positions
Year	Details	UK
1984 (Note: The demos were recorded in 1977 and 1978 but not released until 1984. Beggars Banquet have re-released and re-mastered these recordings numerous times. Current CD editions supplement the original album tracks with all single A and B-sides, 12-inch bonus tracks, studio out-takes, and recovered bootleg live material.)	The Plan: Released: September 1984; Label: Beggars Banquet	29
2019	Replicas - The First Recordings: Released: December 2019; Label: Beggars Banquet	31

=== Singles ===
Year	Single	Peak chart positions									Certifications (sales thresholds)
Year	Single	UK	AUS	AUT	GER	BEL	IRE	NED	NZL	US	Certifications (sales thresholds)
1978	"That's Too Bad"	97 (Note: Charted in 1983.)	—	—	—	—	—	—	—	—	
1978	"Bombers"	—	—	—	—	—	—	—	—	—	
1979	"Down in the Park"	—	—	—	—	—	—	—	—	—	
1979	"Are 'Friends' Electric?"	1	12	12	23	14	3	9	8	105	UK: Gold
"—" denotes releases that did not chart
