= Chris Payne (musician) =

British musician

Christopher John Payne (born 1 February 1957) is a British musician.

He is known as a member of Gary Numan's backing band, Tubeway Army, and for being the co-writer of Visage's late 1980 synth-pop hit single "Fade to Grey", together with Billy Currie and Midge Ure. Payne plays keyboards and viola and also a number of medieval instruments. He formed the band Dramatis with other members of Numan's backing-band in the early 1980s. Payne has composed music for television and films and formed the band "Celtic Legend" in 2001. He has composed, scored, recorded and conducted his orchestral and choral works in London and Prague.

== Collaborations ==
- Tubeway Army, Gary Numan (keyboards and viola 1979–1989)
- Visage (played synthesizer/co-writer of "Fade to Grey")
- Dramatis (band member 1981–1982) (2013–present)
- Dead or Alive (musical director, 1985 tour)
