= Replicas (album) =

- Original artwork (Replicas Redux has "Gary Numan + Tubeway Army")

Studio album by Tubeway Army
- Released: 6 April 1979
- Recorded: December 1978 and January 1979
- Studio: Gooseberry Sound Studios (London)
- Genres: Synth-pop; new wave; post-punk; electro-industrial
- Length: 42:02
- Labels: Beggars Banquet; Atco
- Producer: Gary Numan

Tubeway Army chronology
Tubeway Army (1978)	Replicas (1979)

Singles from Replicas
- 1. "Down in the Park" Released: 30 March 1979; 2. "Are 'Friends' Electric?" Released: 4 May 1979

Replicas is the second and final studio album by the English new wave band Tubeway Army, released on 6 April 1979 by Beggars Banquet Records. It followed their self-titled debut from the previous year. After this, Tubeway Army frontman Gary Numan would continue to release records under his own name, though the musicians in Tubeway Army would continue to work with him for some time. Replicas was the first album of what Numan later termed the "machine" phase of his career, preceding The Pleasure Principle (1979) and Telekon (1980), a collection linked by common themes of a dystopian science fiction future and transmutation of man/machine, coupled with an androgynous image and a synthetic rock sound.

Fuelled by a surprise No. 1 hit single, "Are 'Friends' Electric?", the album also reached No. 1 in the UK charts in July 1979 and was certified Gold by the BPI for sales in excess of 100,000 copies.

== Background ==
A loose concept album, Replicas was based on a dystopian book Numan hoped to eventually complete, set in a not-too-distant future metropolis where Machmen (androids with cloned human skin) and other machines keep the general public cowed on orders from the Grey Men (shadowy officials). While the album's setting and lyrics were directly inspired by the science fiction of Philip K. Dick, particularly his seminal work Do Androids Dream of Electric Sheep?, the title was not. Although Numan's Machmen were similar to replicants, the term used for androids in Ridley Scott's Blade Runner (based on Dick's book), Scott's film came out three years after Tubeway Army's album and Dick never used the word replicant in his original 1968 novel. The album cover shows Numan as a Machman staring out from his room at a waning crescent moon hovering above "The Park" as a barely visible man stands outside while Numan's reflection stares back at himself. The picture was also used for the cover of "Down in the Park", the first single from the album.

== Recording and music ==
Replicas was recorded in late 1978 at Gooseberry Studios, London and completed in February 1979 with overdubs and remixing at Marcus Music Studios.

Musically, Numan's main influence was the commercially unsuccessful John Foxx-led incarnation of Ultravox. Tracks like "Speed of Life" and "Breaking Glass" from David Bowie's Low were also cited, along with Kraftwerk's The Man-Machine album, in particular the long and wistful track "Neon Lights".

The recording built upon the sound of the first Tubeway Army album. While the tracks "The Machman", "You Are in My Vision" and "It Must Have Been Years" recalled the earlier album's guitar-oriented rock, the rest were built solidly around an analog synthesizer, the Minimoog. Along with "Are 'Friends' Electric?", this included "Me! I Disconnect from You", the atmospheric "Down in the Park" (released as a single prior to the album and acquiring cult status though not commercial success), the multi-layered title track and the closing instrumentals "When the Machines Rock" and "I Nearly Married a Human". The latter featuring Numan's first use of a primitive drum machine; it appeared the following year in Carl Sagan's TV series Cosmos: A Personal Voyage.

== Critical reception ==
Professional ratings
Review scores
Source	Rating
AllMusic	4/5 stars
Christgau's Record Guide	B+
Mojo	4/5 stars
MusicOMH	4/5 stars
The New Zealand Herald	4/5 stars
Record Collector	5/5 stars
Record Mirror	4/5 stars
Smash Hits	8/10
Spin	9/10
Uncut	4/5 stars

Smash Hits reviewer Red Starr found the album to have "Strong futuristic imagery, simple but catchy melodies and riffs, haunting synthesiser work — all strikingly delivered in distinctive fashion. Intriguing and definitely different — a good one."

The New York Times deemed the album "weird synthesizer effects and fashionably adenoidal songs and vocals over an accessibly rocking rhythm section."

== Legacy ==
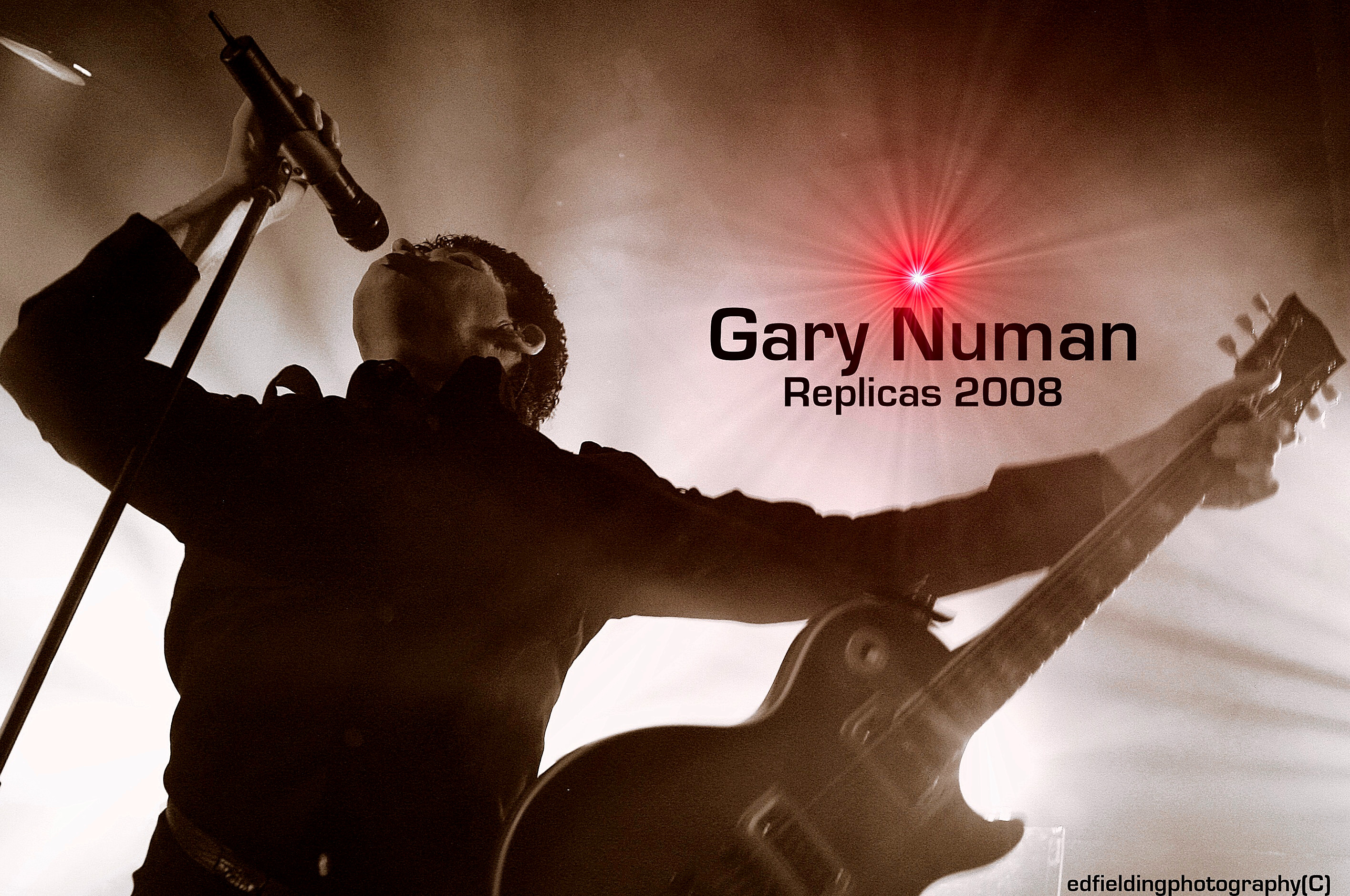
Promoting the 2008 album tour

Replicas' synthesizer sound and occasionally nihilistic lyrics greatly impacted the industrial acts that came to prominence in the mid-1990s such as Marilyn Manson and Nine Inch Nails, both of whom covered Numan's songs on record. Both Manson and Foo Fighters released versions of "Down in the Park". "Are 'Friends' Electric?" was covered by a number of artists, and was most notably the basis for Sugababes' No. 1 hit "Freak Like Me" in 2002. Numan has continued to play tracks from Replicas on his live tours, with "Me! I Disconnect from You", "Are 'Friends' Electric?" and "Down in the Park" being mainstays, whilst "Praying to the Aliens" and "Replicas" have also lately become part of his live repertoire.

== Reissue ==
The 1999 and 2008 reissue editions included several bonus tracks, including three single B-sides: "We Are So Fragile" (from "Are 'Friends' Electric?"), and "Do You Need the Service?" and "I Nearly Married a Human (2)" (from "Down in the Park"). "The Crazies", "Only a Downstat" and "We Have a Technical" were outtakes from the Replicas sessions.

== Track listing ==
All tracks are written by Gary Numan.

Side one
No.	Title	Length
1.	"Me! I Disconnect from You"	3:23
2.	"Are 'Friends' Electric?"	5:25
3.	"The Machman"	3:08
4.	"Praying to the Aliens"	4:00
5.	"Down in the Park"	4:24

Side two
No.	Title	Length
1.	"You Are In My Vision"	3:15
2.	"Replicas"	5:01
3.	"It Must Have Been Years"	4:02
4.	"When the Machines Rock"	3:15
5.	"I Nearly Married a Human"	6:31

1997 CD reissue bonus tracks
No.	Title	Length
11.	"Do You Need The Service?"	3:40
12.	"The Crazies"	2:54
13.	"Only a Downstat"	3:36
14.	"We Have a Technical"	8:04
15.	"We Are So Fragile"	2:56
16.	"I Nearly Married a Human 2"	6:38

=== Replicas Redux (2008) ===
To coincide with Numan's 15-date Replicas Classic Album Tour in 2008, Beggars Banquet issued an expanded 2CD and limited 3CD version of Replicas, titled Replicas Redux.

Disc one
No.	Title	Length
11.	"We Are So Fragile"	2:55
12.	"Do You Need The Service?"	3:39
13.	"I Nearly Married a Human 2"	6:38

Disc two - "Early Versions"
No.	Title	Length
1.	"Me! I Disconnect from You"	3:24
2.	"Are 'Friends' Electric?"	5:25
3.	"The Machman"	3:08
4.	"Praying to the Aliens"	4:08
5.	"Down in the Park"	4:24
6.	"Do You Need The Service?"	3:42
7.	"Only a Downstat"	3:35
8.	"We Have A Technical"	8:00
9.	"You Are In My Vision"	3:22
10.	"Replicas"	5:02
11.	"It Must Have Been Years"	4:04
12.	"When The Machines Rock" (Features vocals not present on the final album mix)	3:15
13.	"The Crazies"	2:54
14.	"I Nearly Married a Human 3"	6:31

Disc three - Limited edition disc only available through Numan's official website
No.	Title	Length
1.	"Are 'Friends' Electric?" (Renegade Soundwave Mix)	5:15
2.	"Replicas" (Early Version 2)	5:05
3.	"Down in the Park" (Early Version 2)	4:23
4.	"Are 'Friends' Electric?" (Early Version 2)	5:28
5.	"Replicas" (Early Version 3)	5:00
6.	"Are 'Friends' Electric?" (Renegade Soundwave Instrumental Mix)	5:14

=== Replicas: The First Recordings (2019) ===
To celebrate the 40th anniversary of the release of Replicas, a special edition of the album, Replicas: The First Recordings was released on 11 October 2019. Released on 2 LP coloured vinyl and 2 CD editions.

Disc one
No.	Title	Length
1.	"You Are In My Vision" (Early Version)	3:22
2.	"The Machmen" (Early Version)	3:11
3.	"Down In The Park" (Early Version)	4:23
4.	"Do You Need The Service?" (Early Version)	3:39
5.	"The Crazies"	2:54
6.	"When The Machines Rock" (Early Version)	3:15
7.	"Me! I Disconnect From You" (Early Version)	3:24
8.	"Praying to the Aliens" (Early Version)	4:05
9.	"It Must Have Been Years" (Early Version)	4:03
10.	"Only a Downstat"	3:35
11.	"I Nearly Married A Human 3" (Early Version)	6:25
12.	"Replicas" (Early Version)	5:01
13.	"Are 'Friends' Electric?" (Early Version)	5:27

Disc two
No.	Title	Length
1.	"Replicas" (Early Version 2)	5:03
2.	"Down In The Park" (Early Version 2)	4:22
3.	"Are 'Friends' Electric?" (Early Version 2)	5:26
4.	"We Have A Technical"	8:00
5.	"Replicas" (Early Version 3)	5:02
6.	"Me! I Disconnect From You" (Peel Session)	3:07
7.	"Down In The Park" (Peel Session)	4:18
8.	"I Nearly Married A Human" (Peel Session)	6:40

== Personnel ==
Tubeway Army

- Gary Numan – keyboards, guitars, vocals, producer, mixing
- Paul Gardiner – bass guitar
- Jess Lidyard – drums

Technical

- John Caffery – engineering, mixing
- Rikki Sylvan – mixing
- Geoff Howes – photographer
- Mary Vango – make-up
- Tony Escott – illustrator
- Malti Kidia – art director

== Charts ==
Chart (1979–80)	Peak position
Australian Albums (Kent Music Report)	11
German Albums (Offizielle Top 100)	45
Dutch Albums (Album Top 100)	44
New Zealand Albums (RMNZ)	8
Swedish Albums (Sverigetopplistan)	37
UK Albums (Official Charts)	1
US Billboard 200	124

Chart (2008)	Peak position
UK Albums (OCC)	96

Chart (2019)	Peak position
UK Albums (OCC)	31

Year-end chart (1979)	Position
UK Albums (OCC)	16

== Certifications ==
Region	Certification	Certified units/sales
Australia (ARIA)	Gold	35,000^{^}
United Kingdom (BPI)	Gold	100,000^{^}
^{^} Shipments figures based on certification alone.
