= Bombers (Tubeway Army song) =

Single by Tubeway Army
- B-side: "Blue Eyes"; "O.D. Receiver"
- Released: 21 July 1978
- Recorded: The Music Centre, Wembley, 15 April 1978
- Genre: Punk rock
- Length: 3:52
- Label: Beggars Banquet; BEG 8
- Songwriter(s): Gary Numan
- Producer(s): Kenny Denton

Tubeway Army singles chronology
"That's Too Bad" (1978)	"Bombers" (1978)	"Down in the Park" (1979)

"Bombers" is the second single by the English new wave band Tubeway Army, released on 21 July 1978, on Beggars Banquet.

"Bombers" is considered by some to be one of the most popular songs by Tubeway Army. The song enjoyed brief popularity in the '80s and is featured in several books cataloguing iconic songs of the period.

== Versions and releases ==
The original demo version, recorded 7–9 March 1978 at Spaceward Studios, near Cambridge. This recording was not released to the public until October 1984, on an album of previously unissued tracks from the same sessions called The Plan. These sessions featured Gary Numan, Paul Gardiner, and Numan's uncle Jess Lidyard on drums.

The single version recorded on 15 April 1978 and released in July the same year. This session was produced by Kenny Denton, and featured a short-lived band line-up of Numan, Gardiner, Barry Benn, and Sean Burke. It has since appeared on CD reissues of The Plan. The single features a slightly revised lyric: on the demo, the third verse starts with "All the junkies pulling needles from their arms." Beggars Banquet feared that the word "junkies" would prevent the song receiving airplay and so, for the single, Numan changed the line to "All the nurses pulling needles from their arms."

It was later re-released as a gatefold with the first Tubeway Army single "That's Too Bad".

== Track listing ==
1. "Bombers" (Valerian) – 3:52
2. "Blue Eyes" (Valerian) – 1:43
3. "O.D. Receiver" (Valerian) – 2:37

== Personnel ==
- Producers:
  - Kenny Denton
- Musicians:
  - Gary Numan: Vocals, Guitar
  - Paul Gardiner: Bass guitar
  - Barry Benn: Drums
  - Sean Burke: Guitar
