= Gary Numan discography =

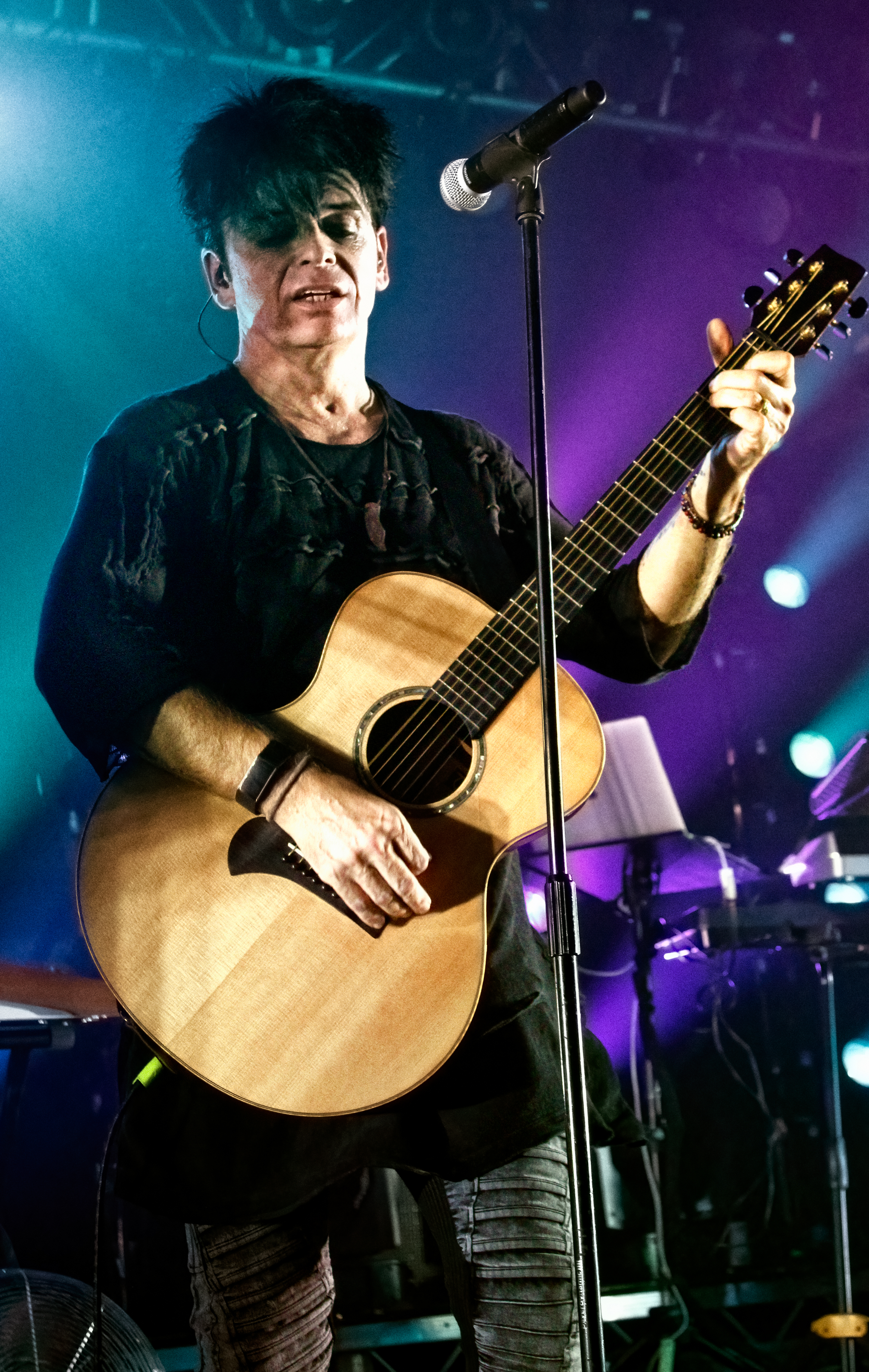
- Gary Numan performing in October 2019
- Studio albums: 22
- Extended plays: 19
- Soundtrack albums: 3
- Live albums: 27
- Compilation albums: 21
- Remix albums: 6
- Singles: 65
- Promotional singles: 10
- Video albums: 30
- Music videos: 47
- Box sets: 8

The following is a comprehensive discography of Gary Numan, a British singer and musician. Numan (born Gary Webb, 1958) released his first record in 1978 as part of the outfit Tubeway Army. Initially unsuccessful, the band scored a huge hit in 1979 with the single "Are 'Friends' Electric?" and their second album Replicas, both of which reached number one in the UK. Numan then decided to release further recordings under his own name, beginning with the single "Cars" later in 1979. Both this and the subsequent album The Pleasure Principle also reached number one in the UK, and Numan became a leading force in the British electronic music scene. He scored a third number-one album in 1980 with Telekon, and more hit singles and albums until the mid-1980s, when his popularity waned. Despite this, he has continued to record and tour on a regular basis up to the present day, and has seen a resurgence in popularity and credibility in recent years. His 2017 studio album, Savage (Songs from a Broken World), entered the UK Albums Chart at number two, which was Numan's highest chart peak since 1980. 2021's Intruder, also entered the UK charts at number two.

== Albums ==
=== Studio albums ===
Title	Album details	Peak chart positions										Cetifications
Title	Album details	UK	AUS	CAN	GER	JPN	NL	NZ	SCO	SWE	US	Cetifications
Tubeway Army (as Tubeway Army)	Released: 24 November 1978; Label: Beggars Banquet; Formats: LP, MC	14 (Note: Charted upon reissue in August 1979.)	—	—	—	—	—	—	14 (Note: Chart peak upon reissue in 2023.)	—	—	
Replicas (as Tubeway Army)	Released: 6 April 1979; Label: Beggars Banquet; Formats: LP, MC	1	11	—	45	—	44	8	—	37	124	BPI: Gold; ARIA: Gold
The Pleasure Principle	Released: 7 September 1979; Label: Beggars Banquet; Formats: LP, MC	1	24	16	—	64	—	19	—	—	16	BPI: Gold; ARIA: Gold; MC: Gold
Telekon	Released: 5 September 1980; Label: Beggars Banquet; Formats: LP, MC	1	24	53	—	—	—	32	30	—	64	BPI: Gold
Dance	Released: 4 September 1981; Label: Beggars Banquet; Formats: LP, MC	3	85	—	—	—	—	—	87 (Note: Chart peak upon reissue in 2018.)	—	167	
I, Assassin	Released: 10 September 1982; Label: Beggars Banquet; Formats: LP, MC	8	95	—	—	—	—	—	35 (Note: Chart peak upon reissue in 2019.)	—	—	
Warriors	Released: 16 September 1983; Label: Beggars Banquet; Formats: LP, MC	12	—	—	—	—	—	—	53 (Note: Chart peak upon reissue in 2021.)	—	—	
Berserker	Released: 9 November 1984; Label: Numa; Formats: LP, MC	45	—	—	—	—	—	—	11 (Note: Chart peak upon reissue in 2025.)	—	—	
The Fury	Released: 16 September 1985; Label: Numa; Formats: CD, LP, MC	24	—	—	—	—	—	—	—	—	—	
Strange Charm	Released: 27 October 1986; Label: Numa; Formats: CD, LP, MC	59	—	—	—	—	—	—	—	—	—	
Metal Rhythm	Released: 26 September 1988; Label: I.R.S., Illegal; Formats: CD, LP, MC	48	—	—	—	—	—	—	—	—	—	
Automatic (as Sharpe & Numan)	Released: 26 June 1989; Label: Polydor; Formats: CD, LP, MC	59	—	—	—	—	—	—	—	—	—	
Outland	Released: 18 March 1991; Label: I.R.S.; Formats: CD, LP, MC	39	—	—	—	—	—	—	—	—	—	
Machine + Soul	Released: 3 August 1992; Label: Numa; Formats: CD, LP, MC	42	—	—	—	—	—	—	—	—	—	
Sacrifice	Released: 24 October 1994; Label: Numa; Formats: CD, LP, MC	94	—	—	—	—	—	—	—	—	—	
Exile	Released: 20 October 1997; Label: Eagle; Formats: CD, MC	48	—	—	—	—	—	—	36	—	—	
Pure	Released: 9 October 2000; Label: Eagle; Formats: CD	58	—	—	—	—	—	—	23	—	—	
Jagged	Released: 13 March 2006; Label: Cooking Vinyl; Formats: CD, 2×LP	59	—	—	—	—	—	—	84	—	—	
Dead Son Rising	Released: 15 September 2011; Label: Mortal; Formats: CD, digital download	87	—	—	—	—	—	—	—	—	—	
Splinter (Songs from a Broken Mind)	Released: 14 October 2013; Label: Mortal; Formats: CD, 2×LP, digital download	20	—	—	—	197	—	—	24	—	175	
Savage (Songs from a Broken World)	Released: 15 September 2017; Label: BMG; Formats: CD, 2×LP, MC, digital download	2	76	—	87	—	171	—	3	—	154	
Intruder	Released: 21 May 2021; Label: BMG; Formats: CD, 2×LP, MC, digital download	2	78	—	15	—	56	—	2	—	—	
"—" denotes releases that did not chart or were not released in that territory.

=== Soundtrack albums ===
Title	Album details	Peak chart positions
Title	Album details	UK Soundtrack
The Radial Pair: Video Soundtrack	Released: August 1994; Label: Salvation; Formats: CD	—
Human (with Michael R Smith)	Released: October 1995; Label: Numa; Formats: CD, MC	—
From Inside (with Ade Fenton)	Released: 7 October 2014; Label: Lakeshore; Formats: CD	18
"—" denotes releases that did not chart.

=== Live albums ===
Title	Album details	Peak chart positions			
Title	Album details	UK	AUS	GER	SCO
Living Ornaments '79	Released: 24 April 1981; Label: Beggars Banquet; Formats: LP, MC	47	—	—	—
Living Ornaments '80	Released: 24 April 1981; Label: Beggars Banquet; Formats: LP, MC	39	—	—	—
White Noise	Released: April 1985; Label: Numa; Formats: 2×LP, MC	29	64	—	—
Ghost	Released: March 1988; Label: Numa; Formats: 2×LP	—	—	—	—
The Skin Mechanic	Released: October 1989; Label: I.R.S.; Formats: CD, LP, MC	55	—	—	—
Dream Corrosion	Released: August 1994; Label: Numa; Formats: 2×CD, 3×LP, 2×MC	86	—	—	—
Dark Light	Released: June 1995; Label: Numa; Formats: 2×LP, 2×MC	107	—	—	—
Living Ornaments '81	Released: January 1998; Label: Beggars Banquet; Formats: 2×CD	—	—	—	—
Scarred – Live at Brixton Academy	Released: 27 January 2003; Label: Eagle; Formats: 2×CD	160	—	—	40
Live at Shepherds Bush Empire	Released: March 2004; Label: Eagle; Formats: 2×CD	—	—	—	—
Hope Bleeds	Released: November 2004; Label: Mortal; Formats: 2×CD	—	—	—	—
Fragment 1/04	Released: April 2005; Label: Mortal; Formats: 2×CD	—	—	—	—
Fragment 2/04	Released: April 2005; Label: Mortal; Formats: 2×CD	—	—	—	—
Jagged Live	Released: 21 May 2007; Label: Mortal; Formats: CD	—	—	—	—
Engineers	Released: 25 February 2008; Label: Beggars Banquet; Formats: CD	—	—	—	—
Telekon – Live	Released: March 2008; Label: Numa; Formats: 2×CD	—	—	—	—
Replicas Live	Released: April 2009; Label: Mortal; Formats: 2×CD	—	—	—	—
The Pleasure Principle Live	Released: 18 October 2010; Label: Mortal; Formats: 2×CD	—	—	—	—
Big Noise Transmission	Released: 20 August 2012; Label: Mortal; Formats: 2×CD	191	—	—	—
Machine Music Live	Released: 17 June 2013; Label: Mortal; Formats: 2×CD	—	—	—	—
Here in the Black – Live at Hollywood Forever Cemetery	Released: 18 January 2016; Label: Machine Music; Formats: 2×CD, 2×LP, digital download	—	—	—	—
Obsession – Live at the Hammersmith Eventim Apollo	Released: 12 December 2016; Label: Machine Music; Formats: 2×CD, 3×LP	—	—	—	—
Live at Hammersmith Odeon 1989	Released: 6 October 2017; Label: Demon; Formats: CD, LP, digital download	—	—	—	—
Savage – Live at Brixton Academy	Released: 9 November 2018; Label: BMG; Formats: 2×CD, digital download	75	—	—	45
When the Sky Came Down (with the Skaparis Orchestra)	Released: 13 December 2019; Label: BMG; Formats: 2×CD, digital download	51	—	—	56
A Perfect Circle (Live at OVO Arena Wembley)	Released: 25 July 2025; Label: BMG; Formats: 2×CD, 3×LP, digital download	34	—	61	8
1000: Live at the Electric Ballroom	Released: 7 November 2025; Label: BMG; Formats: 2×CD, 3×LP, digital download	70	—	—	9
"—" denotes releases that did not chart or were not released in that territory.

=== Remix albums ===
Title	Album details	Peak chart positions	
Title	Album details	UK	SCO
Techno Army Featuring Gary Numan	Released: April 1996; Label: When! Recordings; Formats: CD	—	—
Random (02)	Released: 1998; Label: Beggars Banquet; Formats: CD	—	—
The Mix	Released: 1998; Label: Cleopatra; Formats: CD	—	—
Hybrid	Released: 10 February 2003; Label: Jagged Halo; Formats: 2×CD	99	60 (Note: Chart peak upon reissue in 2020.)
Jagged Edge	Released: 14 July 2008; Label: Mortal; Formats: 2×CD	—	—
Dead Moon Falling	Released: 14 December 2012; Label: Mortal; Formats: CD, digital download	—	—
"—" denotes releases that did not chart or were not released in that territory.

=== Compilation albums ===
Title	Album details	Peak chart positions		Certifications
Title	Album details	UK	SCO	Certifications
Photograph	Released: 1981; Label: Beggars Banquet; Formats: LP, MC; Only released in Germany	—	—	
New Man Numan: The Best of Gary Numan	Released: November 1982; Label: TV; Formats: LP, MC	45	—	
The Plan (as Gary Numan and Tubeway Army)	Released: September 1984; Label: Beggars Banquet; Formats: LP, MC	29	—	
Exhibition	Released: 14 September 1987; Label: Beggars Banquet; Formats: 2×CD, 2×LP, MC	43	—	
The Collection	Released: 23 October 1989; Label: Castle Communications; Formats: CD, 2×LP, MC	—	—	
Isolate	Released: 23 March 1992; Label: Numa; Formats: CD, LP, MC	—	—	
The Best of Gary Numan 1978–1983	Released: 20 September 1993; Label: Beggars Banquet; Formats: 2×CD, MC	70	—	
Here I Am	Released: August 1994; Label: Receiver; Formats: CD	—	—	
The Premier Hits (as Gary Numan and Tubeway Army)	Released: 18 March 1996; Label: Polygram TV; Formats: CD, MC	21	48	BPI: Silver
The Radio One Recordings	Released: April 1999; Label: Strange Fruit; Formats: CD	—	—	
Nicholson / Numan 1987–1994	Released: August 1999; Label: The Record Label; Formats: CD	—	—	
Strange Charm – Live Cuts, Hits, Rarities	Released: 16 August 1999; Label: Castle Pie; Formats: CD	—	—	
Down in the Park: The Alternative Anthology	Released: October 1999; Label: Essential!; Formats: 2×CD	—	—	
New Dreams for Old	Released: 1 November 1999; Label: Eagle; Formats: CD	—	—	
Exposure – The Best of Gary Numan 1977–2002	Released: 20 May 2002; Label: Jagged Halo; Formats: 2×CD	44	50	
Reconnected: Live 'n' More	Released: September 2003; Label: Music Club; Formats: 2×CD	—	—	
Resonator (Pioneer of Sound)	Released: 15 March 2004; Label: Psychobaby; Formats: CD	—	—	
The Complete John Peel Sessions	Released: 7 May 2007; Label: Maida Vale; Formats: CD	—	—	
1979 – The Live EP's	Released: 21 September 2009; Label: Beggars Banquet; Formats: CD	—	—	
Replicas – The First Recordings (as Gary Numan and Tubeway Army)	Released: 11 October 2019; Label: Beggars Banquet; Formats: 2×CD, 2×LP, digital download	31	14	
The Pleasure Principle – The First Recordings	Released: 11 October 2019; Label: Beggars Banquet; Formats: 2×CD, 2×LP, digital download	36	13	
"—" denotes releases that did not chart or were not released in that territory.

=== Box sets ===
Title	Album details	Peak chart positions	
Title	Album details	UK	SCO
Living Ornaments '79 and '80	Released: 24 April 1981; Label: Beggars Banquet; Formats: 2×LP, MC	2	—
The Story So Far	Released: June 1996; Label: Receiver; Formats: 3×CD	—	—
The Numa Years	Released: 29 June 1998; Label: Eagle; Formats: 5×CD	—	—
Disconnection	Released: April 2002; Label: Castle Music; Formats: 3×CD	—	—
78/79 (as Gary Numan and Tubeway Army)	Released: 21 November 2011; Label: Vinyl 180; Formats: 4×LP	—	—
80/81	Released: 21 November 2011; Label: Vinyl 180; Formats: 5×LP	—	—
5 Albums	Released: 13 May 2013; Label: Beggars Banquet; Formats: 5×CD	—	—
45x15 – The Singles Collection 1978–1983	Released: 5 November 2021; Label: Beggars Banquet; Formats: 15×7"	—	40
"—" denotes releases that did not chart.

=== Interview albums ===
- 1986 – Images One & Two
- 1986 – Images Three & Four
- 1987 – Images Five & Six
- 1987 – Images Seven & Eight
- 1989 – Images Nine & Ten
- 1994 – Images Eleven
- 2001 – Purified
- 2006 – Small Black Box
- 2006 – Eko

== EPs ==
Title	EP details	Peak chart positions
Title	EP details	UK
1978 (as Gary Numan and Tubeway Army)	Released: 25 March 1983; Label: Beggars Banquet; Formats: 12"	97
1978 / 1979 Volume Two (as Gary Numan and Tubeway Army)	Released: March 1985; Label: Beggars Banquet; Formats: 12"	82
1978 / 1979 Volume Three (as Gary Numan and Tubeway Army)	Released: March 1985; Label: Beggars Banquet; Formats: 12"	76
The Live EP	Released: 13 May 1985; Label: Numa; Formats: 7", 12", MC	27
The Peel Sessions (as Tubeway Army)	Released: 3 August 1987; Label: Strange Fruit; Formats: 12", MC	118
Selection	Released: 27 November 1989; Label: Beggars Banquet; Formats: CD	—
Dream Corrosion (The Live EP)	Released: August 1994; Label: Numa; Formats: CD, 12"	95
Dark Light (The Live EP)	Released: May 1995; Label: Numa; Formats: CD, 12"	92
Babylon 1	Released: August 1995; Label: Salvation; Formats: CD; Mini-album	—
Babylon 2	Released: August 1995; Label: Salvation; Formats: CD; Mini-album	—
Babylon 3	Released: August 1995; Label: Salvation; Formats: CD; Mini-album	—
Babylon 4	Released: August 1995; Label: Salvation; Formats: CD; Mini-album	—
Babylon 5	Released: November 1995; Label: Salvation; Formats: CD; Mini-album	—
Babylon 6	Released: November 1995; Label: Salvation; Formats: CD; Mini-album	—
Babylon 7	Released: February 1996; Label: Salvation; Formats: CD; Mini-album	—
Replicas: Mixes + Versions (as Gary Numan and Tubeway Army)	Released: January 2010; Label: Beggars Banquet; Formats: CD; Previously released as part of the 2008 Replicas Redux expanded release	—
I Am Dust	Released: 6 June 2014; Label: Mortal; Formats: digital download	—
For You (with Andy Gray)	Released: 20 May 2016; Label: Real Noize; Formats: digital download	—
The Fallen EP	Released: 9 November 2018; Label: BMG; Formats: CD, MC, digital download	—
"—" denotes releases that did not chart.

== Singles ==
=== As lead artist ===
Title	Year	Peak chart positions										Certifications	Album
Title	Year	UK	AUS	BEL	CAN	GER	IRE	NL	NZ	US	US Dance	Certifications	Album
"That's Too Bad" (with Tubeway Army)	1978	—	—	—	—	—	—	—	—	—	—		Non-album singles
"Bombers" (with Tubeway Army)	1978	—	—	—	—	—	—	—	—	—	—		Non-album singles
"Down in the Park" (with Tubeway Army)	1979	—	—	—	—	—	—	—	—	—	—		Replicas
"Are "Friends" Electric?" (with Tubeway Army)	1979	1	12	21	—	23	3	9	8	105	—	BPI: Gold	Replicas
"Cars"	1979	1	9	28	1	45	5	—	18	9	56	BPI: Gold; MC: Gold	The Pleasure Principle
"Complex"	1979	6	—	—	—	—	9	—	—	—	—	BPI: Silver	The Pleasure Principle
"We Are Glass"	1980	5	15	—	—	—	9	—	42	—	—		Telekon
"I Die: You Die"	1980	6	86	—	—	—	16	—	—	102	—		Telekon
"Remember I Was Vapour" (Note: "Remember I Was Vapour" was released in the UK as a free single with the first 100,000 copies of Telekon. However, it was also released as a commercial single in Germany and New Zealand.)	1980	—	—	—	—	—	—	—	—	—	—		Telekon
"Remind Me to Smile" (Note: "Remind Me to Smile" was only released as a single in the US and Canada.)	1980	—	—	—	—	—	—	—	—	—	—		Telekon
"This Wreckage"	1980	20	—	—	—	—	20	—	—	—	—		Telekon
"She's Got Claws"	1981	6	—	—	—	—	12	—	—	—	—		Dance
"Love Needs No Disguise" (with Dramatis)	1981	33	—	—	—	—	—	—	—	—	—		For Future Reference (by Dramatis)
"Music for Chameleons"	1982	19	—	—	—	—	23	—	—	—	—		I, Assassin
"We Take Mystery (To Bed)"	1982	9	—	—	—	—	26	—	—	—	—		I, Assassin
"White Boys and Heroes"	1982	20	—	—	—	—	14	—	—	—	—		I, Assassin
"Warriors"	1983	20	—	—	—	—	15	—	—	—	—		Warriors
"Sister Surprise"	1983	32	—	—	—	—	25	—	—	—	—		Warriors
"Berserker"	1984	32	—	—	—	—	—	—	—	—	—		Berserker
"My Dying Machine"	1984	66	—	—	—	—	—	—	—	—	—		Berserker
"Change Your Mind" (as Sharpe & Numan)	1985	17	—	—	—	—	22	—	39	—	35		Famous People (by Bill Sharpe)
"Your Fascination"	1985	46	—	—	—	—	—	—	—	—	—		The Fury
"Call Out the Dogs"	1985	49	—	—	—	—	—	—	—	—	—		The Fury
"Miracles"	1985	49	—	—	—	—	—	—	—	—	—		The Fury
"I Still Remember"	1986	74	—	—	—	—	—	—	—	—	—		The Fury
"This Is Love"	1986	28	—	—	—	—	—	—	—	—	—		Strange Charm
"I Can't Stop"	1986	27	—	—	—	—	—	—	—	—	—		Strange Charm
"New Thing from London Town" (as Sharpe & Numan)	1986	52	—	—	—	—	—	—	—	—	—		Strange Charm
"Cars ('E' Reg Model)" (remix)	1987	16	—	—	—	—	23	—	—	—	—		Exhibition
"No More Lies" (as Sharpe & Numan)	1988	34	—	—	—	—	—	—	—	—	—		Non-album singles
"Voices" (Note: "Voices" was only released as a single in Germany.) (as Sharpe & Numan)	1988	—	—	—	—	—	—	—	—	—	—		Non-album singles
"New Anger"	1988	46	—	—	—	—	—	—	—	—	—		Metal Rhythm
"America"	1988	49	—	—	—	—	—	—	—	—	—		Metal Rhythm
"I'm on Automatic" (as Sharpe & Numan)	1989	44	—	—	—	—	—	—	—	—	—		Automatic
"Adrenalin" (as NY)	1990	116	—	—	—	—	—	—	—	—	—		Non-album single
"Heart"	1991	43	—	—	—	—	—	—	—	—	—		Outland
"Emotion"	1991	79	—	—	—	—	—	—	—	—	—		Machine + Soul
"The Skin Game"	1992	68	—	—	—	—	—	—	—	—	—		Machine + Soul
"Machine + Soul"	1992	72	—	—	—	—	—	—	—	—	—		Machine + Soul
"Cars" (1993 remix)	1993	53	—	—	—	—	—	—	—	—	—		The Best of Gary Numan 1978–1983
"Like a Refugee (I Won't Cry)" (with Dadadang)	1994	78	—	—	—	—	—	—	—	—	—		Non-album single
"A Question of Faith"	1994	88	—	—	—	—	—	—	—	—	—		Sacrifice
"Absolution"	1995	91	—	—	—	—	—	—	—	—	—		Exile
"Cars" (Premier Mix)	1997	17	—	—	—	—	—	—	—	—	—		The Premier Hits
"Dominion Day"	1998	89	—	—	—	—	—	—	—	—	—		Exile
"Rip"	2002	29	—	—	—	—	—	—	—	—	—		Exposure – The Best of Gary Numan 1977–2002
"Crazier" (with Rico)	2003	13	—	—	—	—	—	—	—	—	—		Hybrid
"In a Dark Place"	2006	63	—	—	—	—	—	—	—	—	—		Jagged
"Healing" (with Ade Fenton)	2007	—	—	—	—	—	—	—	—	—	—		Artificial Perfect (by Ade Fenton)
"The Leather Sea" (with Ade Fenton)	2007	72	—	—	—	—	—	—	—	—	—		Artificial Perfect (by Ade Fenton)
"Love Hurt Bleed"	2013	— (Note: "Love Hurt Bleed" did not enter the UK Singles Chart, but peaked at number 15 on the UK Rock & Metal Singles Chart.)	—	—	—	—	—	—	—	—	—		Splinter (Songs from a Broken Mind)
"My Name Is Ruin"	2017	—	—	—	—	—	—	—	—	—	—		Savage (Songs from a Broken World)
"Intruder"	2021	—	—	—	—	—	—	—	—	—	—		Intruder
"I Am Screaming"	2021	—	—	—	—	—	—	—	—	—	—		Intruder
"Saints and Liars"	2021	—	—	—	—	—	—	—	—	—	—		Intruder
"Now and Forever"	2021	—	—	—	—	—	—	—	—	—	—		Intruder
"—" denotes releases that did not chart or were not released in that territory.

=== As featured artist ===
Title	Year	Peak chart positions		Album
Title	Year	UK	US Dance	Album
"Radio Heart" (Radio Heart featuring Gary Numan)	1987	35	—	Radio Heart
"London Times" (Radio Heart featuring Gary Numan)	1987	48	—	Radio Heart
"All Across the Nation" (Radio Heart featuring Gary Numan)	1987	81	—	Radio Heart
"Are Friends Electric" (Generator featuring Gary Numan)	1994	—	—	Non-album single
"Pray for You" (Plump DJs featuring Gary Numan)	2003	89	—	Eargasm
"Metal" (Note: "Metal" was only released as a single in the US.) (Afrika Bambaataa featuring Gary Numan)	2005	—	43	Dark Matter Moving at the Speed of Light
"Pleasure in Heaven" (Motor featuring Gary Numan)	2012	—	—	Man Made Machine
"Polished Chrome (The Friend Pt. 1)" (Chris Liebing featuring Gary Numan)	2018	—	—	Burn Slow
"Guts of Love" (I Speak Machine featuring Gary Numan)	2025	—	—	Non-album single
"—" denotes releases that did not chart or were not released in that territory.

=== Promotional singles ===
Title	Year	Peak chart positions	Album
Title	Year	US Dance	Album
"This Is My Life"	1984	—	The Plan
"Respect" (Note: "Respect" was released as a promotional single in Canada.)	1989	—	New Anger
"My World Storm" (Note: "My World Storm" was released as a promotional single in the US.)	1991	46	Outland
"Listen to My Voice" (Note: "Listen to My Voice" was released as a promotional single in the US.)	2000	—	Pure
"Pure" / "Rip"	2000	—	Pure
"Little Invitro"	2007	—	Pure
"The Fall"	2011	—	Dead Son Rising
"When the World Comes Apart"	2017	—	Savage (Songs from a Broken World)
"The End of Things"	2017	—	Savage (Songs from a Broken World)
"It Will End Here"	2018	—	The Fallen EP
"—" denotes releases that did not chart or were not released in that territory.

== Videos ==
=== Video albums ===
Title	Album details	Peak chart positions
Title	Album details	UK
The Touring Principle '79	Released: 14 April 1980; Label: Beggars Banquet; Formats: VHS; Originally only available by mail order, before being commercially released in October 1980 by Warner Home Video	—
Micromusic	Released: April 1982; Label: Palace Video; Formats: VHS, Betamax, LD	—
Newman Numan: The Best of Gary Numan	Released: November 1982; Label: Palace Video; Formats: VHS, Betamax	—
The Berserker Tour	Released: May 1985; Label: Peppermint Video; Formats: VHS	—
The Skin Mechanic	Released: June 1990; Label: Picture Music International; Formats:VHS	20
Shadow Man	Released: 1992; Label: Numa; Formats: VHS	—
Dream Corrosion	Released: August 1994; Label: Numa; Formats: VHS	—
Anthology	Released: 27 August 2002; Label: Silverline; Formats: DVD	—
Gary Numan	Released: July 2003; Label: Classic Rock Legends; Formats: DVD	—
Hope Bleeds	Released: November 2004; Label: Mortal; Formats: DVD	41
Fragment 1/04 – Birmingham Academy Live	Released: April 2005; Label: ILC Music; Formats: DVD	—
Fragment 2/04 – Shepherds Bush Empire Live	Released: April 2005; Label: ILC Music; Formats: DVD	—
Jagged Live	Released: May 2007; Label: Mortal; Formats: DVD	—
Telekon – Live	Released: March 2008; Label: Numa; Formats: DVD	—
Replicas Live	Released: 16 February 2009; Label: Mortal; Formats: DVD	3
Conversation – The Pleasure Principle Tour 2009 DVD Programme	Released: 11 December 2009; Label: Self-released; Formats: DVD	—
The Pleasure Principle Live	Released: 18 October 2010; Label: Mortal; Formats: DVD	3
Decoder	Released: 9 May 2011; Label: Mortal; Formats: DVD	—
Machine Music – The Best of Gary Numan	Released: 11 June 2012; Label: Mortal; Formats: 2×DVD	10
Big Noise Transmission	Released: 20 August 2012; Label: Mortal; Formats: 2×DVD	9
Splintered – The Making of Splinter	Released: 1 November 2013; Label: Mortal; Formats: DVD	—
Machine Music	Released: 3 December 2013; Label: Mortal; Formats: 2×DVD	—
From Inside	Released: 2 March 2015; Label: Lakeshore; Formats: DVD	—
Here in the Black – Live at Hollywood Forever Cemetery	Released: 4 March 2016; Label: Machine Music; Formats: DVD	—
Reinvention	Released: 29 July 2016; Label: Machine Music; Formats: DVD	1
Android in La La Land	Released: 26 August 2016; Label: Perfectmotion; Formats: DVD	—
Obsession – Live at the Hammersmith Eventim Apollo	Released: 12 December 2016; Label: Machine Music; Formats: DVD	—
Legacy – Live Liverpool Olympia	Released: 5 May 2017; Label: Machine Music; Formats: DVD	3
Savage – Live at Brixton Academy	Released: 9 November 2018; Label: BMG; Formats: DVD	—
When the Sky Came Down (with the Skaparis Orchestra)	Released: 13 December 2019; Label: BMG; Formats: DVD	—
"—" denotes releases that did not chart or were not released in that territory.

=== Music videos ===
Title	Year	Artist	Director
"Cars"	1979	Gary Numan	Derek Burbidge
"Complex"	1979	Gary Numan	Derek Burbidge
"Metal"	1979	Gary Numan	Unknown
"We Are Glass"	1980	Gary Numan	Derek Burbidge
"I Die: You Die"	1980	Gary Numan	Derek Burbidge
"This Wreckage"	1980	Gary Numan	Derek Burbidge
"She's Got Claws"	1981	Gary Numan	Julien Temple
"Love Needs No Disguise"	1981	Dramatis	Jeff Baynes
"Music for Chameleons"	1982	Gary Numan	Jeff Baynes
"We Take Mystery (To Bed)"	1982	Gary Numan	Jeff Baynes
"White Boys and Heroes"	1982	Gary Numan	Unknown
"Warriors"	1983	Gary Numan	Unknown
"Berserker"	1984	Gary Numan	Unknown
"My Dying Machine"	1984	Gary Numan	Unknown
"Change Your Mind"	1985	Sharpe & Numan	Terry Braun
"Your Fascination"	1985	Gary Numan	Terry Braun
"Call Out the Dogs"	1985	Gary Numan	Unknown
"Miracles"	1985	Gary Numan	Unknown
"I Still Remember"	1986	Gary Numan	Unknown
"New Thing from London Town"	1986	Sharpe & Numan	Unknown
"This Is Love"	1986	Gary Numan	Unknown
"I Can't Stop"	1986	Gary Numan	Unknown
"Radio Heart"	1987	Radio Heart	Unknown
"Heart"	1991	Gary Numan	David Rose
"Emotion"	1991	Gary Numan	Tracey Adam
"Machine + Soul"	1992	Gary Numan	Tracey Adam
"Like a Refugee (I Won't Cry)"	1994	Dadadang	Vittorio Panza
"Dominion Day"	1998	Gary Numan	Philip Lowrey
"Cars"	1999	Fear Factory	John Bartley
"Rip"	2002	Gary Numan	Unknown
"Crazier"	2003	Gary Numan & Rico	Unknown
"In a Dark Place"	2006	Gary Numan	Paul Green
"Healing"	2007	Ade Fenton	Simon Dunn
"The Fall"	2011	Gary Numan	Unknown
"My Machines"	2011	Battles	DANIELS
"Petals"	2012	Officers	Julian Jones
"I Am Dust"	2013	Gary Numan	Chris Corner
"Love Hurt Bleed"	2013	Gary Numan	Joel Kazuo Knoernschild
"I Am Dust" (Logan Owlbeemoth Edit)	2014	Gary Numan	Logan Owlbeemoth
"Dark Rain"	2017	Titán	Gabriel Govela
"My Name Is Ruin"	2017	Gary Numan	Chris Corner
"The End of Things"	2017	Gary Numan	Unknown
"When the World Comes Apart"	2017	Gary Numan	Paul Green
"TOS2020" (Tower of Strength)	2020	The Mission	Vicente Cordero
"Intruder"	2021	Gary Numan	Chris Corner
"Saints and Liars"	2021	Gary Numan	Chris Corner
"Guts of Love"	2025	I Speak Machine	Maf Lewis

== Contributions ==
Year	Song	Artist	Album	Role
1980	"Automatic Crazy"	James Freud and Berlin	Non-album single	Co-producer
1980	"I Dream of Wires"	Robert Palmer	Clues	Keyboards, writer
1980	"Found You Now"	Robert Palmer	Clues	Co-writer
1980	"We Know Who Done It"	The Barron Knights	Jesta Giggle	Writer
1981	"Stormtrooper in Drag"	Paul Gardiner	Non-album single	Producer, lead vocals
1981	"Love Needs No Disguise"	Dramatis	For Future Reference	Lead vocals
1981	"Stars"	Nicky Robson	Non-album single	Producer, backing vocals
1982	"Style Kills"	Robert Palmer	Maybe It's Live	Co-writer
1984	"Venus in Furs"	Paul Gardiner	Non-album single	Producer
1984	"Show Me Something Real"	Tik and Tok	Intolerance	Keyboards, backing vocals
1984	"A Child with a Ghost"	Tik and Tok	Intolerance	Writer
1984	"Ultra Violet Light"	Claire Hamill	Touchpaper	Keyboards
1984	"Pump Me Up"	Caroline Munro	Non-album singles	Keyboards, backing vocals, production, writer
1984	"The Picture"	Caroline Munro	Non-album singles	Keyboards, backing vocals, production, writer
1987	"Radio Heart"	Radio Heart	Radio Heart	Lead vocals
1987	"London Times"	Radio Heart	Radio Heart	Lead vocals
1987	"All Across the Nation"	Radio Heart	Radio Heart	Lead vocals
1995	"Are 'Friends' Electric?"	Nancy Boy	Promosexual	Producer
1998	"Cars"	Fear Factory	Obsolete	Lead vocals, writer
1998	"Obsolete"	Fear Factory	Obsolete	Spoken word
1999	"I Live Your Dream" (Gary Numan remix)	Project Pitchfork	Non-album single	Remix producer
2000	"A Sailor in Love with the Sea"	The 6ths	Hyacinths and Thistles	Lead vocals
2000	"Redirected Mail"	Dubstar	The Self Same Thing EP	Lead vocals
2003	"Angels"	Junkie XL	A Broadcast from the Computer Hell Cabin	Lead vocals, writer
2003	"Ancients"	Gary Numan / Andy Gray	Hybrid	Lead vocals, co-writer
2007	"Healing"	Ade Fenton	Artificial Perfect	Lead vocals, co-writer
2007	"Slide Away"	Ade Fenton	Artificial Perfect	Lead vocals
2007	"Recall"	Ade Fenton	Artificial Perfect	Lead vocals
2007	"The Leather Sea"	Ade Fenton	Artificial Perfect	Lead vocals
2009	"25 Seconds" (Gary Numan & Ade Fenton remix)	Mandy Kane	25 Seconds EP	Remix co-producer
2009	"Venus in Furs" (with Little Boots)	The Velvet Underground	BBC Radio 6 Live	Guest vocals
2009	"Stuck on Repeat"	Little Boots	BBC Radio 6 Live	Guest vocals
2011	"My Machines"	Battles	Gloss Drop	Lead vocals
2011	"Crawl"	South Central	Society of the Spectacle	Lead vocals
2012	"Petals"	Officers	On the Twelve Thrones	Lead vocals
2012	"Petals"	Officers	Dead Moon Falling	Lead vocals
2012	"For You"	Andy Gray	Dead Moon Falling	Lead vocals
2012	"For You"	Andy Gray	For You EP	Lead vocals
2012	"Pleasure in Heaven"	Motor	Man Made Machine	Lead vocals
2014	"Redesign"	Protafield	Nemesis	Guest vocals
2014	"Long Way Down"	Masafumi Takada	The Evil Within (Original Game Soundtrack)	Lead vocals
2015	"Happiness" (remix)	IAMX	Everything Is Burning (Metanoia Addendum)	Remix producer
2015	"Losing Myself In You"	VOWWS	The Great Sun	Lead vocals
2016	"We Are All Hunted"	Andy Gray	For You EP	Lead vocals
2016	"In My Liar's Grave"	Andy Gray	For You EP	Lead vocals
2016	"It Will All Rain Down"	Andy Gray	For You EP	Lead vocals
2016	"Dark Rain"	Titán	Dama	Lead vocals
2016	"Swansea"	Dusky	Outer	Lead vocals
2016	"Here for You"	Jean-Michel Jarre	Electronica 2: The Heart of Noise	Lead vocals, co-writer
2016	"Talk (Are You Listening to Me?)"	John Foxx	21st Century: A Man, a Woman and a City	Lead vocals, co-writer
2016	"Within the Deepest Darkness (Fearful)"	The Mission	Another Fall from Grace	Backing vocals
2018	"Polished Chrome (The Friend Part 1)"	Chris Liebing	Burn Slow	Lead vocals
2018	"Summer" (Gary Numan & Ade Fenton Edit)	Simple Minds	Non-album singles	Edit co-producer
2020	"TOS2020" (Tower of Strength) (with Martin Gore, Midge Ure, Billy Duffy, Rachel Goswell, Andy Rourke, Julianne Regan, Kirk Brandon, Lol Tolhurst, and Miles Hunt)	The Mission	Non-album singles	Guest vocals
2021	"I Know Time (Is Calling)" (with Paul McCartney)	Mark Ronson	Watch the Sound with Mark Ronson	Lead vocals, co-writer
2021	"Love Like Anthrax"	Gang of Four	The Problem of Leisure: A celebration of Andy Gill and Gang of Four	Lead vocals
2022	"Vanishing Shadows"	Liela Moss	Internal Working Model	Guest vocals
2025	"Guts of Love"	I Speak Machine	Non-album single	Guest vocals

== Covers ==
=== Covers by Numan ===
Year	Song	Album	Original artist	Notes
1978	"White Light/White Heat"	Live at the Roxy 77 Tubeway Army	The Velvet Underground	The only known live album recording of Tubeway Army before becoming famous. Recorded in 1977, unofficially released in 1981, reissued on Tubeway Army in 1998.
1979	"On Broadway"	Living Ornaments '79	The Drifters	Performed only as a live performance.
1980	"Trois Gymnopédies (First Movement)"	Telekon	Erik Satie	
1984	"On Broadway"	Non-album track	The Drifters	Performed with and on The Leo Sayer Show.
1992	"U Got the Look"	Machine + Soul	Prince	
1992	"1999"	Machine + Soul	Prince	

=== Notable covers and samples of Numan ===
Year	Song	Artist	Artist album	Original album	Original year(s)	Notes
1980	"I Dream of Wires"	Robert Palmer	Clues	Telekon	1980	Performed on keyboards
1979	"Don't Be a Dummy"	John Du Cann	The World's Not Big Enough	The Plan	1978 1984 (released)	
1984	"A Child with a Ghost"	Tik & Tok	Intolerance	Berserker	1984	
1984	"Pump Me Up"	Caroline Munro	Non-album single	Berserker	1985	Written and produced by Gary Numan on his label "Numa" under her own name later included on Numan's 1985 album The Fury entitled "Pump It Up" rather "Pump Me Up"
1994	"Down in the Park"	Marilyn Manson	Sweet Dreams (Are Made of This) single	Replicas	1979	Included in "Sweet Dreams" single, which was also a cover by Eurythmics.
1995	"Are 'Friends' Electric?	Nancy Boy	Promosexual	Replicas	1979	
1996	"Down in the Park"	Foo Fighters	Songs in the Key of X: Music from and Inspired by the X-Files	Replicas	1979	Covered song while using lightly sampling the original song
1998	"Cars"	Fear Factory	Obsolete	The Pleasure Principle	1979	Written and co-lead vocalist with the band.
2000	"Metal"	Nine Inch Nails	Things Falling Apart	The Pleasure Principle	1979	Also features a sample from Numan's "M.E.", and a piano line that references "Remember I Was Vapour" from Telekon.
2001	"Where's Your Head At"	Basement Jaxx	Rooty	The Pleasure Principle	1979	Sampling from both songs "M.E." and "This Wreckage"
2001	"Where's Your Head At"	Basement Jaxx	Rooty	Telekon	1980	Sampling from both songs "M.E." and "This Wreckage"
2002	"Freak Like Me"	Sugababes	Angels With Dirty Faces	Replicas	1979	Sampled loop of "Are 'Friends' Electric?"
2005	"Metal"	Afrika Bambaataa	Dark Matter Moving at the Speed of Light	The Pleasure Principle	1979	Written and lead vocalist.
2009	"Hiding All the Stars"	Chicane	Giants	The Pleasure Principle	1979	Sampled "Cars"
2018	"Metal"	Poppy	Non-album single	The Pleasure Principle	1979	

=== Re-recordings ===
Remake year	Original year	Song	Original release album	Remake release album	Notes
1998	1979	"Metal"	The Pleasure Principle	Dominion Day EP	20th Anniversary
1998	1979	"Down in the Park"	Replicas	Dominion Day EP	20th Anniversary
1998	1988	"Voix"	Metal Rhythm	Dominion Day EP	10th Anniversary
2002	1978	"My Shadow Iin Vain"	Tubeway Army	Exposure	Remake for compilation album
2002	1978	"Everyday I Die"	Tubeway Army	Exposure	Remake for compilation album
2003	1979	"M.E."	The Pleasure Principle	Hybrid	Remake added to the Hybrid remix album
2003	1994	"Bleed"	Sacrifice	Hybrid	Although it is not considered an official remake and is remixed by Sulpher, it was a ground up production with a complete overhaul in production to the original.
2003	1997	"Absolution"	Exile	Hybrid	Although it is not considered an official remake and is remixed by Andy Gray, it was a ground up production with a complete overhaul in production to the original.

== Top of the Pops appearances ==
Year	Song	Format	Date
1979	"Are 'Friends' Electric?"	Mimed performance	24 May 1979
1979	"Are 'Friends' Electric?"	Mimed performance (repeat)	14 June 1979
1979	"Are 'Friends' Electric?"	Mimed performance	28 June 1979
1979	"Are 'Friends' Electric?"	Mimed performance (repeat)	5 July 1979
1979	"Are 'Friends' Electric?"	Mimed performance (repeat)	12 July 1979
1979	"Are 'Friends' Electric?"	Mimed performance	19 July 1979
1979	"Cars"	Mimed performance	30 August 1979
1979	"Cars"	Mimed performance (repeat)	13 September 1979
1979	"Cars"	Music video	20 September 1979
1979	"Complex"	Music video	22 November 1979
1979	"Are 'Friends' Electric?"	Mimed performance	25 December 1979
1980	"We Are Glass"	Music video	22 May 1980
1980	"I Die: You Die"	Music video	28 August 1980
1980	"I Die: You Die"	Music video	4 September 1980
1980	"This Wreckage"	Mimed performance	18 December 1980
1981	"This Wreckage"	Mimed performance (repeat)	15 January 1981
1981	"She's Got Claws"	Music video	3 September 1981
1982	"Music for Chameleons"	Mimed performance	4 March 1982
1982	"Music for Chameleons"	Mimed performance	18 March 1982
1982	"We Take Mystery (To Bed)"	Music video	17 June 1982
1982	"White Boys and Heroes"	Music video	26 August 1982
1983	"Warriors"	Mimed performance	1 September 1983
1983	"Sister Surprise"	Mimed performance	20 October 1983
1984	"Cars"	Mimed performance (repeat)	5 January 1984
1984	"Berserker"	Mimed performance	8 November 1984
1985	"Change Your Mind"	Top 40 Breaker clip	14 February 1985
1985	"Change Your Mind"	Mimed performance	21 February 1985
1985	"Are 'Friends' Electric?"	Top 40 Breaker clip	30 May 1985
1986	"I Can't Stop"	Music video	3 July 1986
1987	"Cars ('E' Reg Model)"	Top 40 Breaker clip	24 September 1987
1987	"Cars ('E' Reg Model)"	Mimed performance	1 October 1987
1994	"Cars ('E' Reg Model)"	Mimed performance (repeat)	29 September 1994
1995	"Are 'Friends' Electric?"	Mimed performance (repeat)	9 March 1995
1996	"Cars" (Premier Mix)	Live performance	14 March 1996
2002	"Are 'Friends' Electric?" / "Rip"	Live performance	21 August 2002
2003	"Crazier"	Live performance	4 July 2003
2006	"Are 'Friends' Electric?"	Mimed performance (repeat)	19 March 2006
