= The Premier Hits =

Greatest hits album by Gary Numan / Tubeway Army
- Released: 18 March 1996; 11 August 2015 (Vinyl release)
- Recorded: 1977–1983
- Genre: New wave, electronic, synthpop
- Length: 76:20, 86:40 (Vinyl release)
- Label: Polygram TV, Beggars Banquet; 531 149-2
- Producer: Gary Numan, Dramatis, Simon Heywood, Kenny Denton, Zeus B. Held

Gary Numan / Tubeway Army chronology
Human (1995)	The Premier Hits (1996)	Techno Army featuring Gary Numan (1996)

The Premier Hits is a compilation album by Gary Numan released in March 1996 on the Polygram TV record label. The album reached No 21 in the UK Albums Chart, leaving the chart after three weeks. It currently stands as the best selling compilation by Gary Numan. The album was promoted by the re-released 1987 remixed version of "Cars" ('E' Reg Model), re-titled as the 'Premier Mix' in a TV advert campaign for Carling Premier lager. The single reached No 17, making the third time that "Cars" has reached the top 40 in the UK Singles Chart.

All the tracks were digitally remastered in November 1995 and the enclosed twelve page colour booklet contains photos and an essay by long term Numan collaborator Steve Malins. All the single sleeves are also illustrated with the unexplained exception of Stormtrooper in Drag and Love Needs No Disguise.

The album was reissued in 1997 by Beggars Banquet as Premier Hits with a different sleeve design (again taken from the Dance album photo session). Currently the album stands as the most famous and highest selling Gary Numan compilation, and was certified Silver by the BPI in March 2015.

The album was again reissued in August 2015 by Beggars Banquet as Premier Hits as a 2LP Vinyl set, while seeing a change of the track listing. It involves the removal of the "Cars" 'Premier Mix' while the addition of four bonus tracks, “Metal”, "We Are So Fragile", "Films" and "Me, I Disconnect From You".

== Track listing ==
Original 1996 release listing.

1. "Cars" (Premier Mix) – 3:40 Previously released as the 'E Reg Model' remix from the 1987 compilation album Exhibition.
2. "I Die: You Die" – 3:43 from Telekon
3. "Are 'Friends' Electric?" – 5:23 from Replicas
4. "Down in the Park" – 4:23 from Replicas
5. "We Are Glass" – 4:47 from Telekon
6. "Bombers" – 3:54 Non-album single
7. "We Take Mystery (To Bed)" – 3:43 from I, Assassin
8. "She's Got Claws" – 4:56 from Dance
9. "Complex" – 3:12 from The Pleasure Principle
10. "Music For Chameleons" – 3:40 from I, Assassin
11. "That's Too Bad" – 3:20 Non-album single
12. "This Wreckage" – 5:24 from Telekon
13. "Warriors" – 4:09 from Warriors
14. "Love Needs No Disguise" – 4:38 from the Dramatis album For Future Reference; also appended to some versions of Dance
15. "White Boys and Heroes" – 3:37 from I, Assassin
16. "Sister Surprise" – 5:01 from Warriors
17. "Stormtrooper in Drag" – 4:53 from Dance
18. "Cars" – 3:55 from The Pleasure Principle

Reissued 2015 Vinyl release listing

1. "Cars" – 3:55 from The Pleasure Principle
2. "I Die: You Die" – 3:43 from Telekon
3. "Are 'Friends' Electric?" – 5:23 from Replicas
4. "Down in the Park" – 4:23 from Replicas
5. "We Are Glass" – 4:47 from Telekon
6. "Metal" – 3:22 from The Pleasure Principle
7. "We Are So Fragile" – 2:53 from Replicas
8. "Bombers" – 3:54 Non-album single
9. "We Take Mystery (To Bed)" – 3:43 from I, Assassin
10. She's Got Claws" – 4:56 from Dance
11. "Complex" – 3:12 from The Pleasure Principle
12. Music For Chameleons" – 3:40 from I, Assassin
13. That's Too Bad" – 3:20 Non-album single
14. "This Wreckage" – 5:24 from Telekon
15. "Films" – 4:09 from The Pleasure Principle
16. "Warriors" – 4:09 from Warriors
17. "Me! I Disconnect From You – 3:22 from Replicas
18. "Love Needs No Disguise" – 4:38 from the Dramatis album For Future Reference; also appended to some versions of Dance
19. "White Boys and Heroes" – 3:37 from I, Assassin
20. "Sister Surprise" – 5:01 from Warriors
21. "Stormtrooper in Drag" – 4:53 from Dance

== Charts ==
Weekly album charts
Chart (1996)	Peak position
UK Top 40 (OCC)	21

== Certificates ==
Region	Certification	Certified Sales
United Kingdom (BPI)	Silver	60,000
