= New Man Numan: The Best of Gary Numan =

Greatest hits album by Gary Numan
- Released: 1982
- Genre: New wave, synthpop
- Label: T.V. Records
- Producer: Gary Numan, Dramatis, Simon Heyworth

Gary Numan chronology
I, Assassin (1982)	New Man Numan: The Best of Gary Numan (1982)	Warriors (1983)

Professional ratings
Review scores
Source	Rating
Allmusic	3/5 stars

New Man Numan: The Best of Gary Numan is a compilation album released on the T.V. Records label in 1982 of songs featuring Gary Numan. The album reached number 45 on the UK Albums Chart.

== Track listing ==
=== Side 1 ===
1. "Are 'Friends' Electric?" by Tubeway Army
2. "Cars" by Gary Numan
3. "We Are Glass" by Gary Numan
4. "Complex" by Gary Numan
5. "Me, I Disconnect From You" by Tubeway Army
6. "Down In The Park" by Tubeway Army
7. "I Die: You Die" by Gary Numan

=== Side 2 ===
1. "She's Got Claws" by Gary Numan
2. "Love Needs No Disguise" by Dramatis, vocals Gary Numan
3. "This Wreckage" by Gary Numan
4. "Stormtrooper in Drag" by Paul Gardiner featuring Gary Numan
5. "We Take Mystery (To Bed)" by Gary Numan
6. "Music for Chameleons" by Gary Numan
7. "White Boys And Heroes" by Gary Numan

All songs written by Gary Numan except "Love Needs No Disguise" (Cedric Sharpley, Chris Payne, Denis Haines, Rrussell Bell) and "Stormtrooper In Drag" (Paul Gardiner)

All songs produced by Gary Numan except "Love Needs No Disguise" (Dramatis, Simon Heyworth)
