= Living Ornaments '81 =

Live album by Gary Numan
- Released: January 1998
- Recorded: Wembley Arena, London, 28 April 1981
- Genre: New wave, synthpop
- Length: 121:28
- Label: Beggars Banquet Records
- Producer: Gary Numan

Gary Numan chronology
Exile (1997)	Living Ornaments '81 (1998)	The Mix (1998)

Professional ratings
Review scores
Source	Rating
AllMusic	4/5 stars

Living Ornaments '81 is a live album recording of a concert on 28 April 1981 by British musician Gary Numan. It was released as a double CD in 1998. The 28 April 1981 show was the third and last of Numan's 'Farewell Concerts' staged at Wembley Arena (although Numan would return to performing live shows the following year). The concert was filmed and released on VHS as Micromusic in April 1982; Living Ornaments '81 is essentially an audio release of the video, albeit one released almost 16 years later.

In 1981, Beggars Banquet Records released edited versions of two Numan concerts as the live albums Living Ornaments '79 and Living Ornaments '80. In 1998, an expanded version of Living Ornaments '79, featuring the entire concert, was released on CD. An expanded CD version of Living Ornaments '80 album had been planned for release as well, but tapes of the full concert had been lost. Living Ornaments '81 – hitherto unreleased as an official live album – was therefore released on CD instead. (In 2004, a mixing console recording of a complete concert from Numan's 1980 tour was discovered and deemed to be of sufficient quality to release commercially, enabling an expanded CD re-release of Living Ornaments '80 in 2005.)

== Track listing ==
=== Disc one ===
1. "Intro/This Wreckage" – 7:40
2. "Remind Me to Smile" – 3:22
3. "Metal" – 3:14
4. "Me! I Disconnect from You" – 3:03
5. "Complex" – 3:10
6. "The Aircrash Bureau" – 5:24
7. "Airlane" – 3:24
8. "M.E." – 4:32
9. "Everyday I Die" – 4:38
10. "Films" – 5:47
11. "Remember I Was Vapour" – 4:34
12. "Trois Gymnopedies (First Movement)" – 3:04
13. "Conversation" (mono) – 7:39

=== Disc two ===
1. "She's Got Claws" – 4:51
2. "Cars" – 3:39
3. "I Dream of Wires" – 4:37
4. "I'm an Agent" – 3:57
5. "The Joy Circuit" – 5:56
6. "I Die: You Die" – 3:43
7. "Cry the Clock Said" – 5:26
8. "Tracks" – 2:19
9. "Down in the Park" – 5:59
10. "My Shadow in Vain" – 2:38
11. "Please Push No More" – 5:29
12. "Are 'Friends' Electric?" – 5:40
13. "We Are Glass/Outro" – 7:43

Although the third track on disc one is listed as "Metal" (a song from Numan's 1979 album The Pleasure Principle), its actual lyrics identify it as the song "Moral", a reworking of "Metal" which was recorded for Numan's then-forthcoming 1981 album Dance. Living Ornaments '81 also features live versions of "She's Got Claws" and "Cry the Clock Said" that pre-date the studio recordings as featured in Dance. Numan can be heard introducing "She's Got Claws" as his "new single;" the song was released as a single four months after the concert.

The song "Conversation", included at the end of disc one, is a bonus track. It was played at the first two Wembley shows but replaced by "Complex" for the 28 April show. The version included on the Living Ornaments '81 set is from the 26 April show, and is a monitor mix of noticeably poor audio quality.

The instrumental title track of Numan's 1979 album Replicas is used a total of three times throughout the concert: once as the intro (similarly to Living Ornaments '79), once as the outro; and as a pseudo-intro to the track "Films." The theme can therefore be heard on disc 1 tracks 1 and 10, and disc 2 track 13. Despite the extensive use of its theme, the actual track of "Replicas" is not listed, nor is it featured in its entirety in this recording.

== Micromusic VHS/DVD ==
Originally released in April 1982, the Micromusic video cassette features the same listing as the subsequent Living Ornaments '81 CD, with the exception of the aforementioned bonus track "Conversation." Soon after its video release, the show was broadcast on British television, albeit in an edited, highlights-only version featuring the following tracks: "Intro," "This Wreckage," "Airlane," "M.E.," "She's Got Claws," "Cars," "I'm an Agent," "The Joy Circuit," "I Die: You Die," "Tracks," "Down in the Park," "Are "Friends" Electric?," "We Are Glass," and "Outro." Both the full version and the edited version of the concert have been released on VHS. The full version of Micromusic was released on DVD in April 2010, with an hour-long 2006 interview with Numan as a bonus feature.
