= Living Ornaments '79 and '80 =

Box set by Gary Numan
- Released: 24 April 1981
- Recorded: Hammersmith Odeon, London 28 September 1979 and 16 September 1980
- Genres: New wave, synthpop
- Label: Beggars Banquet
- Producer: Gary Numan

Gary Numan chronology
Living Ornaments '80 (1981)	Living Ornaments '79 and '80 (1981)	Dance (1981)

Professional ratings
Review scores
Source	Rating
AllMusic	4/5 stars

Living Ornaments '79 and '80 is a box set by English musician Gary Numan that was released in April 1981. The box-set contains the two live albums Living Ornaments '79 and Living Ornaments '80 which were also released separately in April 1981. Although Living Ornaments '79 and Living Ornaments '80 only reached numbers 47 and 39 on the UK Albums Chart respectively, the box set reached number two.

== Track listing ==
All tracks written by Gary Numan.

=== Living Ornaments '79 ===
==== Side one ====
1. "Airlane" – 3:12
2. "Cars" – 3:20
3. "We Are So Fragile" – 2:33
4. "Films" – 3:45
5. "Something's in the House" – 4:08

==== Side two ====
1. "My Shadow in Vain" – 2:50
2. "Conversation" – 7:45
3. "The Dream Police" – 4:12
4. "Metal" – 3:25

=== Living Ornaments '80 ===
==== Side one ====
1. "This Wreckage" – 5:20
2. "I Die: You Die" – 3:38
3. "M.E." – 4:27
4. "Everyday I Die" – 4:22
5. "Down in the Park" – 5:55

==== Side two ====
1. "Remind Me to Smile" – 3:40
2. "The Joy Circuit" – 5:47
3. "Tracks" – 2:43
4. "Are 'Friends' Electric?" – 5:30
5. "We Are Glass" – 4:32

== Personnel ==
- Gary Numan – vocals, guitar, synthesizer, producer, mixer
- Rrussell Bell – guitar
- Billy Currie – keyboards (Living Ornaments '79)
- Robert Ellis – photographer
- Paul Gardiner – bass
- Peter Gilbert – photographer
- Will Gosling – assistant mixer
- Roger Mason – keyboards (Living Ornaments '80)
- Chris Payne – keyboards, viola
- Cedric Sharpley – drums
- Tim Summerhayes – engineer
- Phil Thornalley – assistant engineer
