= Techno Army Featuring Gary Numan =

Techno Army featuring Gary Numan

Remix album by Gary Numan
- Released: April 1996
- Genre: New wave, pop, synthpop
- Length: 60:34
- Label: Castle Communications; WEN CD 006
- Producer: Nick Smith and Miles Seabrook

Gary Numan chronology
| The Premier Hits (1996) | Techno Army featuring Gary Numan (1996) | Random (1997) |

Techno Army featuring Gary Numan is a remix album by English musician Gary Numan. It was released in April 1996 and consists of remixes of various Numan tracks from 1979 to 1994 with newly recorded vocals by Numan. The artwork and booklet do not confirm who remixed the tracks, though it is likely to be Nick Smith and Miles Seabrook (with the definite exception of "Cars" (Talla 2XLC Remix).

Numan's own liner notes state:-

"As a songwriter, to have other musicians cover your songs is something of an honour. To have almost an entire album devoted to your work is extremely flattering and so, for me, this has been a most interesting time. My original versions of these songs, recorded over the last 16 years or so, are somewhat different and so it has been fascinating to watch other musicians' interpretations of them come to life.

My own music has, particularly over the last two years, taken a much darker, heavier direction and so it is highly unlikely that I personally, would have reworked these songs in this style. For that reason alone this album is somewhat disconnected from me but is, nonetheless, something that makes me enormously proud and I am grateful to Nick and Miles for putting it together."

== Track listing ==
1. "Are 'Friends' Electric?" – 5:39
2. "Cars" – 4:14
3. "We Are So Fragile" – 4:20
4. "We Are Glass" – 5:33
5. "She's Got Claws" – 4:12
6. "I Die: You Die" – 4:26
7. "Deadliner" – 4:09
8. "Machine and Soul" – 4:21
9. "Emotion" – 5:12
10. "A Question of Faith" – 4:10
11. "U Got the Look" – 4:17
12. "Cars" (Rush Hour Skadiva) – 4:18
13. "Cars" (Talla 2XLC Remix) – 5:40
