= Exposure (Gary Numan album) =

Compilation album by Gary Numan
- Released: 2002
- Genre: New wave, electronic, synthpop
- Length: 64:09 / 70:27
- Label: Jagged Halo / Artful Records; JHCD 002
- Producer: Gary Numan, Sulpher

Gary Numan chronology
Pure (2000)	Exposure (2002)	Hybrid (2003)

Professional ratings
Review scores
Source	Rating
AllMusic	3/5 stars

Exposure – The Best of Gary Numan 1977–2002 is a compilation album by Gary Numan featuring tracks from his Beggars Banquet Records years together with later and newly re-recorded material in non-chronological order.

The twelve page colour booklet contains pictures of Gary from the years in question and liner notes by executive producer Steve Malins. Some errors relating to the track listing were made (see below).

== Track listing ==
CD1

1. "Films" – 4:10
2. "I Die: You Die" – 3:43
3. "Are 'Friends' Electric?" – 5:23
4. "Pure" – 5:09
5. "Dead Heaven" – 5:22
6. "Down in the Park" – 4:24
7. "Me! I Disconnect from You" – 3:23
8. "Metal" – 3:30
9. "She's Got Claws" – 4:56
10. "Magic" – 4:45
11. "We Are Glass" – 4:46
12. "Music for Chameleons" (12") – 6:57
13. "My Shadow in Vain" (New version) – 3:19
14. "Everyday I Die" (New version) – 4:20

CD2

1. "My Jesus" – 5:45
2. "Cars" – 3:58
3. "Dominion Day" – 4:50
4. "Complex" – 3:11
5. "We Are So Fragile" – 2:53
6. "Rip" – 5:04
7. "M.E." – 5:37
8. "We Take Mystery (To Bed)" – 3:41
9. "Dark" – 4:30
10. "Remember I Was Vapour" – 5:11
11. "Listen to My Voice" – 5:12
12. "Deadliner" – 4:30
13. "Exposure" – 2:47
14. "Voix" – 4:44
15. "A Prayer for the Unborn" (Andy Gray Mix) – 8:34

== Notes ==
- The 12" version of "Music For Chameleons" saw its first CD release on this compilation.
- "Remember I Was Vapour" is incorrectly listed as "Remember I Was a Vapour".
- "Exposure" was a newly recorded instrumental.
- "Voix" is actually the 1998 re-recorded version – "Voix '98".
