= Southam (disambiguation) =

Southam is a town in Warwickshire, England.

Southam or South Ham, may also refer to:

== Places ==
- Southam, Gloucestershire, a village in Gloucestershire, England, UK
- Southam Rural District, a former rural district of Warwickshire, England, UK
- South Ham, a district and ward of Basingstoke, England, UK

== Organisations ==
- Southam Inc., a former Canadian newspaper publisher. Now part of Postmedia News
- Southam United F.C., a football team
- Southam Zoo, a former zoo

== People with the surname ==
- Ann Southam (1937–2010), Canadian composer and music teacher
- Harry Stevenson Southam (1875–1954), Canadian newspaper publisher
- Thomas Wallace Southam (1900–1990), businessman and amateur composer
- Tom Southam (born 1981), English professional cyclist
- William Southam (1843-1932), Canadian newspaper publisher

== See also ==
- Baron Banbury of Southam, a peerage title
- Ham-Sud (English: Ham South), Quebec, Canada
- South (disambiguation)
- Ham (disambiguation)
