= Vitar =

Vitar may refer to:

- Vitar violins
- Mike Vitar (born 1978), American child actor
