= Big Noise Transmission =

Live album by Gary Numan
- Released: 20 August 2012
- Recorded: The Ritz, Manchester, December 2011
- Genre: New wave, synthpop, industrial rock
- Label: Mortal Records; MORTALCD11

Gary Numan chronology
'The Pleasure Principle Live (2010)	Big Noise Transmission (2012)	Machine Music Live

Big Noise Transmission is a live album by English musician Gary Numan. The album was released in 2012 by Mortal Records and is a recording of Numan's December 2011 concert at The Ritz, Manchester.

The CD is an exclusive fan club release via Townsend Records. A DVD of the concert was also released. Big Noise Transmission reached number 9 in the Official Charts Music Video Top 40.

== Track listing ==
=== Disc 1 ===
1. "Resurrection" (from "Dead Son Rising" 2011)
2. "Down in the Park" (from "Replicas" 1979)
3. "The Fall" (from "Dead Son Rising" 2011)
4. "Haunted" (from "Jagged" 2006)
5. "When the Sky Bleeds, He Will Come" (from "Dead Son Rising" 2011)
6. "Films" (from "The Pleasure Principle" 1979)
7. "Big Noise Transmission" (from "Dead Son Rising" 2011)
8. "Pure" (from "Pure" 2000)
9. "Dead Sun Rising" (from "Dead Son Rising" 2011)
10. "Everyday I Die" (from "Tubeway Army" 1978)

=== Disc 2 ===
1. "We Are the Lost"
2. "Absolution"
3. " For the Rest of My Life"
4. "Noise Noise"
5. "Everything Comes Down to This"
6. "Jagged"
7. "I Die: You Die"
8. "Cars"
9. "My Shadow in Vain"
10. "Are 'Friends' Electric?"

== Personnel ==
- Gary Numan: vocals, guitar
- Richard Beasley: drums
- Presley: keyboards
- Ade Fenton: keyboards
- Tim Muddiman: guitar
- Steve Harris: bass
