= The Radio One Recordings =

Compilation album by Gary Numan
- Released: April 1999
- Recorded: Maida Vale Studios, London on 10 January 1979 and 29 May 1979, and at Wembley Arena, London on 30 November 1979
- Genre: New wave, synthpop
- Length: 42:05
- Label: Strange Fruit
- Producer: Bob Sargeant, Tony Wilson, Jeff Griffin

Gary Numan chronology
Living Ornaments '81 (1998)	The Radio One Recordings (1999)	Pure (2000)

Professional ratings
Review scores
Source	Rating
AllMusic	4/5 stars

The Radio One Recordings is a compilation album of British musician Gary Numan tracks played live and recorded live for BBC Radio 1. The album brings together the tracks from the July 1989 EP of Tubeway Army's 10 January 1979 and Numan's 29 May 1979 sessions for disc jockey John Peel's show and three tracks broadcast by BBC Radio 1 from the Year of the Child concert held at Wembley Arena on 30 November 1979.

== Track listing ==
All tracks written by Gary Numan.

1. "Me! I Disconnect From You" – 3:07
2. "Down in the Park" – 4:17
3. "I Nearly Married a Human" – 6:37
4. "Cars" – 3:15
5. "Airlane" – 3:24
6. "Films" – 2:47
7. "Conversation" – 6:45
8. "Me! I Disconnect From You" (live) – 3:06
9. "Metal" (live) – 3:28
10. "Down in the Park" (live) – 5:04
- "Me! I Disconnect From You" is incorrectly listed as "Me, I Disconnect From You".

== Personnel ==
- Gary Numan – vocals, keyboards (tracks 1–3), guitar (tracks 1–3)
- Rrussell Bell – guitar (tracks 8–10), keyboards (tracks 8–10), viola (tracks 8–10)
- Neil Burn – engineer (tracks 1–3)
- Billy Currie – keyboards (tracks 1–10)
- Paul Gardiner – bass
- Jeff Griffin – producer (tracks 8–10)
- Jess Lidyard – drums (tracks 1–3)
- Chris Lycett – engineer (tracks 8–10)
- Chris Payne – keyboards (tracks 4–10)
- Mike Robinson – engineer (tracks 4–7)
- Bob Sargeant – producer (tracks 1–3)
- Cedric Sharpley – drums (tracks 4–10)
- Tony Wilson – producer (tracks 4–7)
