= Dance (Gary Numan album) =

Studio album by Gary Numan
- Released: 4 September 1981
- Recorded: June–July 1981
- Studio: Rock City Studios (Shepperton)
- Genres: Experimental music; new wave; ambient; jazz fusion; synth-pop
- Length: 57:01
- Label: Beggars Banquet
- Producer: Gary Numan

Gary Numan chronology
Telekon (1980)	Dance (1981)	I, Assassin (1982)

Singles from Dance
- 1. "She's Got Claws" Released: 21 August 1981

Professional ratings
Review scores
Source	Rating
AllMusic	2/5 stars
Release Magazine	6/10 stars
Smash Hits	9/10

Dance is the third solo studio album by the English new wave musician Gary Numan, released on 4 September 1981 by Beggars Banquet Records. It was the first studio album Numan released after his "Farewell Concerts" staged at Wembley Arena (although Numan would return to performing live shows in 1982).

Dance features the single "She's Got Claws", which reached no. 6 on the singles chart in September 1981 during a six-week chart run. The album itself reached no. 3 on the UK charts and remained on the charts for eight weeks, and was certified with a silver disc in the UK for over 60,000 sales.

== Overview ==
Dance was Numan's most experimental album to date with a minimalistic approach featuring sparse electronic sounds and prolific use of drum machines and percussion. With synth-pop music in the mainstream by 1981, Numan made a conscious effort to explore new musical areas. Influenced by Brian Eno, Kraftwerk, Lou Reed and Japan, Numan hired Japan's bassist Mick Karn to play on the album. Dance is described as Numan's first true solo album, having previously been supported by an accompanying backing band on his previous albums.

Lyrically the songs were inspired by the imagery of authors William S. Burroughs and J. G. Ballard and features Numan's own personal experiences, particularly a relationship that had turned bitter.

The song "Stories" was performed live by Numan in his "Teletour" of 1980, prior to its recording for Dance; a live version of "Stories" can be found in the 2005 expanded edition of Numan's live album Living Ornaments '80. The songs "She's Got Claws" and "Cry, The Clock Said" were premiered at Numan's "farewell concerts" at Wembley Arena in April 1981 and live versions are included on the live album Living Ornaments '81 (1998). The song "Moral" is a radical reworking of the track "Metal" on Numan's 1979 album The Pleasure Principle, including a lyrical stab at the contemporary New Romantic movement and featuring an appearance by violinist Nash the Slash. Parts of the new version were performed in the live version of "Metal" on Living Ornaments '81. A previously unreleased extended version of the studio track appeared on the 2018 vinyl double LP reissue of Dance. "Night Talk", co-written by Numan and Paul Gardiner, was originally the B-side of "Stormtrooper in Drag", a collaboration released under the name Paul Gardiner in July 1981. The title track "Dance" was not included on the album and remained unreleased until it appeared as a bonus track on the 1999 CD release of the album.

== Recording ==
Numan started working on the album in late 1980. A fan of Japan's album Gentlemen Take Polaroids, he hired Japan's bassist Mick Karn to play on the album. Numan encouraged Karn to improvise around a basic musical outline. The first song they collaborated on was "She's Got Claws", Karn's saxophone riff on the track was a spontaneous improvisation and Numan kept the first take of it. Japan's guitarist Rob Dean also played on the album and the Italian voice on "Boys Like Me" is Japan's publicist Connie Filapello. Other collaborators on the album include violinist Nash the Slash, Queen drummer Roger Taylor, Chris Payne and Cedric Sharpley from Numan's live backing band, and keyboardist Roger Mason.

== Critical reception ==
Reaction to the album was mixed, some critics applauding what they saw as a less commercial career move and others viewing the change of pace with cynicism. A positive review appeared in Smash Hits magazine which gave the album a 9 out of 10 rating, describing the music as "timeless". Writing for NME, Paul Morley argued that the album elevated Numan above many synthesizer contemporaries: "Dance does prove that when judged against his proper peers he can come out well... It's a thoughtful response to the new competition: Numan self-controlled and sophisticated. He can filter and exploit past noises as sensibly, even surprisingly, as anyone", but Morley felt that the music lacked other things: "Dance is Numan's neatest, cleanest and most responsible homage to Brian Eno. The elements of Eno's meditative adjustments and slippy neology are used well, but Another Green World's breathtaking personality, intimacy, grace and irony is missing." Reviewing the album in Record Mirror, Daniela Soave expressed the belief that Numan on Dance appeared as the "Leonard Cohen of synth music". Paul Colbert in Melody Maker also notes the influence of Eno although ultimately describes Dance as, "an album by a victim, and he [Numan] suffers at his own hand".

Retrospectively, on a vinyl double LP reissue of the album, Ned Ragget wrote in a highly positive 2018 review in The Quietus that Numan's Dance is "one of the most interesting albums he ever released", calling it a "weirdly thrilling" album where "everything had gotten calmer, quieter, more introspective, but no less electronic or textured" [than his previous albums], especially pointing out the ten minute "Cry, The Clock Said" as a highlight, a song that is "capturing deep blue melancholia with precision and skill, a further processing of heartache. With its steady beats almost like a rhythmic patter of raindrops, a guest appearance by Canadian prog figure Nash The Slash on violin adding delicately mournful touches, keyboards softly sparkling then withdrawing, a lead melody played with calm deliberation, Numan's clipped lyric delivered with a wounded yearn, it's easily one of his most affecting numbers then and now. His spoken-word break can barely be heard, a self-rumination, and if the joke is to say that the robot is finally human, a better take is to say that there aren't many songs like it anywhere that capture the shocked emptiness after a decisive break, like the heart steadily beats but there's not much to warm it or comfort it". Raggett also pointed out that "Numan's obsessive love of strong rhythms plays out – the soft bursts and beats of electronic pulses, often touched with gentle echo, are nearly always played first and foremost in the mix, and he hangs the song's hooks around them with the same catchiness as he had readily demonstrated over nearly everything he'd already released. It's not art-rock, it's art-pop, but transformed, extended."

A few years after Dance's release Numan conceded, "if I was supposed to be a pop star doing music for the masses, it probably wasn't the right thing to do", but he praised the standard of playing on it.

== Track listing ==
All tracks are written by Gary Numan, except "Night Talk" and "Stormtrooper in Drag", co-written with Paul Gardiner.

No.	Title	Length
1.	"Slowcar to China"	9:05
2.	"Night Talk"	4:26
3.	"A Subway Called 'You'"	4:38
4.	"Cry, the Clock Said"	9:56
5.	"She's Got Claws"	4:58
6.	"Crash"	3:39
7.	"Boys Like Me"	4:16
8.	"Stories"	3:11
9.	"My Brother's Time"	4:38
10.	"You Are, You Are"	4:03
11.	"Moral"	4:33

CD bonus tracks
No.	Title	Originally from	Length
12.	"Stormtrooper in Drag"	collaborative standalone single with Paul Gardiner	4:59
13.	"Face to Face"	B-side of collaborative single with Dramatis	3:46
14.	"Dance"	album outtake	2:45
15.	"Exhibition"	"She's Got Claws" 12" B-side	4:24
16.	"I Sing Rain"	"She's Got Claws" 12" B-side	2:29

- Previous CD releases of Dance (Japan in 1990, and the UK in 1993) included "Love Needs No Disguise", Numan's 1981 single with Dramatis, as a bonus track. The track was subsequently replaced by its B-side, "Face to Face", for the subsequent edition of Dance, although "Love Needs No Disguise" would be included on the 1996 Numan compilation, The Premier Hits.

On 19 January 2018, Beggars Arkive released Dance as a vinyl double-album, with the following track listing:

No.	Title	Length
1.	"Slowcar to China"	9:05
2.	"Night Talk"	4:26
3.	"A Subway Called 'You'"	4:36
4.	"Cry, the Clock Said"	9:54
5.	"She's Got Claws"	4:59
6.	"Crash"	3:35
7.	"Boys Like Me"	4:14
8.	"Stories"	3:09
9.	"My Brother's Time"	4:35
10.	"You Are, You Are"	4:00
11.	"Moral" (extended version, previously unreleased)	5:41
12.	"Stormtrooper in Drag"	4:57
13.	"Face to Face"	3:45
14.	"Dance"	2:46
15.	"Exhibition"	4:26
16.	"I Sing Rain"	2:29

- The only previously unreleased track in the 2018 edition of Dance is the extended version of "Moral," which is over a minute longer than the version in the original album. The 2018 edition of Dance otherwise replicates the track listing of the standard CD edition.

== Personnel ==
- Gary Numan – vocals, Polymoog, SCI Prophet-5, Roland Jupiter-4, Yamaha CP-30, ARP Odyssey, Roland CR-78, Linn LM-1, Claptrap, guitar, bass, piano, percussion, claves, handclaps
- Paul Gardiner – bass, guitar, ARP Odyssey
- Cedric Sharpley – drums
- Chris Payne – viola
- John Webb – Roland Jupiter-4, Linn LM-1, handclaps
- Jess Lidyard – drums
- Mick Karn – fretless bass, saxophone
- Nash the Slash – violin
- Roger Taylor – drums, tom-toms
- Rob Dean – guitar
- Tim Steggles – percussion
- Sean Lynch – Linn LM-1
- Connie Filapello – vocals
- Roger Mason – SCI Prophet-5, Yamaha CP-30
- Mick Prague – bass

== Charts ==
Chart (1981)	Peak position
United Kingdom (OCC)	3
United States	167
Australia	85

Chart (2018)	Peak position
United Kingdom (OCC)	134
