= Warriors (Gary Numan album) =

Studio album by Gary Numan
- Released: 16 September 1983
- Recorded: 1983
- Studio: Rock City Studios (Shepperton, Middlesex)
- Genre: New wave; experimental; funk; jazz fusion; industrial rock; synth-pop
- Label: Beggars Banquet
- Producer: Gary Numan; Bill Nelson (uncredited except on labels)

Gary Numan chronology
I, Assassin (1982)	Warriors (1983)	The Plan (1984)

Alternative cover
- 2002 rerelease cover

Singles from Warriors
- 1. "Warriors" Released: 26 August 1983; 2. "Sister Surprise" Released: 14 October 1983

Professional ratings
Review scores
Source	Rating
AllMusic	2/5 stars
Smash Hits	2/10

Warriors is the fifth solo studio album by the English new wave musician Gary Numan, released on 16 September 1983 by Beggars Banquet Records. It would be his last studio release on that label.

== Preproduction ==
Gary Numan returned to England in May 1983 to record the album. He had written most of the album's material in late 1982-early 1983, while he was living in Jersey, Channel Islands (after spending a few months in Los Angeles, California as a tax exile). While Numan was working on the early Warriors material, Beggars Banquet suggested that, for the first time during his career, he should use a co-producer instead of producing the album entirely by himself (this was initially suggested by the label for Numan's previous studio album I, Assassin (1982), a suggestion Numan refused at the time). Numan was not keen at first, but WEA managing director Mike Heap promised him "a virtually unlimited promotional budget" on the album if he signed up a producer. Numan eventually decided to recruit guitarist Bill Nelson for the job, as he was an admirer of Nelson's former band, Be-Bop Deluxe. Numan claimed that Nelson was his "favourite guitar player, bar none." Nelson recalled, "The record company asked me to produce his album. They felt he needed to catch up a little bit. There were developments happening in electronic pop that were a little less heavy or stodgy. They wanted to brighten up his approach a little and wanted me involved to do that."

Unfortunately for Numan, Mike Heap was fired and the record company was no longer willing to cover all the costs for Numan's album. It was stated sometime after the release of the album that WEA had, in fact, told Numan he was reaching sales of 60,000 units, and that was satisfactory to them. Numan later remarked, "When the new people came in, I was as far from a priority act as it was possible to be. I felt as though they'd cut me down at the knees and it was the last time I got excited about a promise in the music business."

Numan later claimed that Warriors pointed the way for his artistic decline throughout the 1980s:

I thought that by getting in some of the best players and singers around I could make the albums more 'musical,' and that my own limitations would be less of a problem. What I actually did was progressively bury the very style that my fans had enjoyed. For a while I still sang, of course, but I swamped my own performances in huge layers of backing vocals. Musically I became much more of an arranger of noises than a musician, at least, that was how I felt. I didn't realise what I was doing, but with Warriors I was lighting the fires of what came close to being my funeral...If burying myself under the impressive performances of [other musicians and singers] was, ultimately, the wrong direction in which to be moving, it did give the albums some stunning musical moments. Warriors had as fine a bunch of players as it was possible to get.

== Recording the album ==
For the recording of the album, Numan retained drummer Cedric Sharpley, keyboardist Chris Payne, and guitarist Rrussell Bell, all of whom had played on his studio albums and tours since 1979. Pino Palladino, the bassist on Numan's previous album I, Assassin (1982), was unable to return for Warriors. At Palladino's suggestion, Numan recruited Joe Hubbard as a replacement. Bill Nelson played guitars during the recording of Warriors, giving them more prominence than they had been allowed on I, Assassin (1982). Numan asked Dick Morrissey to be the saxophonist on the album, as he admired his work on the film score for Blade Runner (1982). Numan later described Morrissey as "brilliant, a musical genius. First take, perfect, not a single note wrong." Ultimately, Morrissey would contribute to five Numan albums, from 1983 to 1991. Female backing vocals were also introduced to the Numan sound on Warriors, provided by Tracy Ackerman of the English jazz-funk band Shakatak. (Numan later formed the duo Sharpe & Numan with Shakatak's Bill Sharpe.)

Unfortunately, Numan and Bill Nelson quarrelled during the Warriors recording sessions; both artists had different ideas as to how the album should sound, and differing philosophies on music in general. Numan later recalled:

It seemed as though our reasons for even breathing were completely opposed to one another. At one point we were talking about why we were in the business...[Nelson] told me that all creative people pick up beams of inspiration from across the cosmos and we channel it into creative art and we do what we do for the people. I said, 'That's complete bollocks,' and it all went downhill from then on really, as we began to grate on each other quite badly.

The relationship between Numan and Nelson deteriorated to the point that Numan "would go out and play pool" while Nelson worked in the studio. Numan ultimately disliked Nelson's mix of Warriors (finding it "too tinny"), and so he remixed the album and made changes to the track listing: both "My Car Slides" and "Poetry and Power" were relegated to B-side status (their place on the album being taken by other tracks), and "Sister Surprise" and "The Tick Tock Man" were almost completely re-recorded. Nelson asked not to be credited on the final album, although he is credited on the label. Numan later conceded that Nelson "did a lot of very inventive things on [Warriors] which, because of our differences, I failed to fully appreciate at the time. To be with him in a room when he was playing guitar was an honour. I would just sit back and listen and all my antagonism would float away."

Interviewed in 2012, Numan said,

I don't think I was quite the right kind of person for [Bill Nelson] given the way he sees the world. The differences were down to attitude. He's amazingly creative but he's very kind of ethereal, if that's the right word... I've changed a bit over the years and sort of grown into the artful side but it's never really been my big reason and it's all of his reason. I think it's fantastic there are people like that but unfortunately I'm not! When I was younger I really wanted to make a point but I wasn't like him and I guess I kind of played up to it and so we didn't get on brilliantly. But I remain a huge fan and I think he's the best guitar player ever, an absolute genius... [It] was an honour to be privy to genius. I really regret that we didn't get on but I like to think that we would do now. I'm certainly not as much of an arse as I used to be then! I've mellowed with age.

When asked in 2021 about his working relationship with Numan, Bill Nelson recalled,

It was tricky. It was always a struggle to introduce new things to him, and I ended up mixing the album with the engineer and I then went home. A couple of days later, the engineer called me and said, "I've just quit because Gary's remixing the album and everything we've done has gone out of the window." So I then decided to take my name off of it. I have seen [interviews] in recent years where he's said he's regretted doing that and I don't bear him any hard feelings whatsoever.

== Title and cover ==
Numan floated prospective titles for the new album amongst his fanbase. Fans were given the opportunity to vote for one of three potential album titles – This Prison Moon, Poetry and Power, and Glasshouse. Numan ultimately overruled the fans' preference of This Prison Moon and chose Warriors as the album's title.

Numan's image for the Warriors album, singles, and live tour (consisting of a black leather costume with weapon accessories, set against a post-apocalyptic backdrop) was influenced by the film Mad Max 2 (1981). Many parts of the costume came from a sex shop in Soho, London. Numan later regretted the image, partly because Warriors was widely perceived and misunderstood as a science fiction album. Numan explained that the songs were largely autobiographical and introspective, dealing with inner feelings and career worries. The idea for the image was to represent him as a lonely warrior fighting for his survival.

== Critical reception ==
The album received a mixed reception by contemporary critics. Several critics questioned or mocked Numan's visual image that came with the music. NME's Chris Bohn wrote that "As the Road Warrior he isn't anywhere near so interesting as his earliest incarnation as a paranoid worrier", but added that Numan "has always been a seasoned scavenger, so one shouldn't deny that Warriors is the most negatively attractive electronic pop muzak since Eno's influential Another Green World.”

Melody Maker's Helen Fitzgerald found that "Warriors suffers from Numan's critical identity crisis". "Gary has sunk further into his make-believe world of ominous fantasy where sci-fi escapism can bolster insecurity and Gary can sink grate-fully into his comic strip character and remain forever the hero.” Fitzgerald positively noted "The Iceman Comes" as the album's highlight: "A gradual and brooding example of slow-tempo funk, its chilling basslines weave a compulsive spell and just for one moment Gary lets spontaneity override his obsessive need to control, allowing the vocal to ride with the music instead of dominating it."

While the album received negative reviews by Sounds' Dave McCullough and Smash Hits' Tim de Lisle, Record Mirror's Jim Reid positively concluded: “Warriors is about the most bearable Numan record I've heard. It's well played, sweetly produced and at times Dick Morrissey's sax is quite lovely.”

Reviewing the album for The Guardian, Robin Denselow found that “The music shows some signs of progression. Chattering synthesisers and good growling bass work from Joe Hubbard lead off into efficient electro-funk pieces like I Am Render and This Prison Moon, or cool, gentle jazzy pieces like The Iceman Comes.” Mark Steels in Time Out wrote: “Numan is possessed of far more talent than he is given credit for, showing him to be both a mood-piece composer of no little merit and a producer of imagination and skill. Morrissey's measured solos, Joe Hubbard's nimble bass work and Cedric Sharpley's crisp, unfussy drumming lend many of the tracks an engaging jazz-funk feel."

== Singles, sales and tour ==
The title track was released as the lead single from the album in August 1983, reaching No. 20 in the UK charts. Numan later claimed that the single's chart performance was "killed" because it was released as a picture disc, and the week it was released, the chart compilers decided that picture discs were ineligible and did not count their sales. The single peaked at No. 12 before the picture disc sales were stripped.

The album itself was released the following month, reaching number 12 on the UK Albums Chart. Although four places lower than Numan's previous studio album, it did eventually sell more than I, Assassin (1982). Even so, it was Numan's first studio album not to be released in the US, and was only available there as an import.

The album spent six weeks on the UK Albums Chart, and despite its relatively low chart placement, it gathered some of the best reviews Numan had ever had in the UK music press. In October 1983, a shorter, re-recorded version of "Sister Surprise" was released as the second and final single off the album. It charted at No. 32, making it the lowest-charting Numan solo single up to that point. Due to Numan's dissatisfaction with Beggars Banquet who were now just the middle men between Numan and WEA and other major record companies in general, he decided to form his own record label, Numa Records, in late 1983. Numan released his next three studio albums through Numa Records.

Warriors was supported by a 40-date UK tour from September to October 1983 (with support from robotic mime and music duo Tik and Tok). These were Numan's first live dates in the UK since his Wembley farewell concerts in 1981. Numan's friend and former bassist, Paul Gardiner, made an onstage appearance during a Warriors show at the Hammersmith Odeon, London. To date, no live albums or videos from the 1983 tour have been officially released, although the BBC did record the final night at the Hammersmith Odeon, and the 20 October show in Glasgow is believed to have been professionally filmed. Bootleg-quality audio from that Glasgow show has surfaced on YouTube, along with more professional-quality audio from the tour's 10 June 1983 Leicester date.

The music magazine Smash Hits ran a three-page feature on the tour titled "The Mad Max Factor" featuring an interview with Numan, several photographs of the show and of Numan and the performers backstage, and a candid look at the fans who attended the shows.

Warriors was issued on compact disc in 1993 as part of a double disc set with Numan's 1979 album The Pleasure Principle (cat. BEGA 154 CD). Each album came with several extra tracks. A remastered version of the Warriors album was released on CD in 2002, with six bonus tracks.

== Track listing ==
All songs are written by Gary Numan except for "I Am Render", with music by John Webb, and lyrics by Numan.

Side one

1. "Warriors" – 5:50
2. "I Am Render" – 4:56
3. "The Iceman Comes" – 4:25
4. "This Prison Moon" – 3:18
5. "My Centurion" – 5:22

Side two

6. "Sister Surprise" – 8:29
7. "The Tick Tock Man" – 4:22
8. "Love Is Like Clock Law" – 4:00
9. "The Rhythm of the Evening" – 5:54
- The song "I Am Render" is based on Roger Zelazny's sci-fi novel The Dream Master (the novel's protagonist is Dr. Charles Render).
- The song "My Centurion" was inspired by Numan's near-fatal 1982 plane crash. (The aircraft involved was a Cessna T210L Centurion.)

Bonus tracks on the 1993 reissue

1. "My Car Slides (1)" ("Warriors" B-side) – 3:01
2. "My Car Slides (2)" ("Warriors" B-side) – 4:42
3. "Poetry and Power" ("Sister Surprise" B-side) – 4:25
4. "Face to Face (Letters)" – 3:46
5. "Cars" ('E' Reg Extended Model) – 6:12
6. "Cars" (Motorway Mix) – 4:30
- "Face to Face (Letters)" originally appeared on the B-side of the 12" single of 1981's "Love Needs No Disguise" by Dramatis and Numan, where it was titled "Face to Face". It was later included on the 12" single of "Sister Surprise" where it was mistakenly titled "Letters". The track was excluded from future reissues of Warriors and instead featured on reissues of Dance (1981), matching its original year of release.
- The remixes of "Cars" included here were both from 1987.

Bonus tracks on the 2002 reissue

1. "Poetry and Power" ("Sister Surprise" B-side) – 4:25
2. "My Car Slides (1)" ("Warriors" B-side) – 3:01
3. "My Car Slides (2)" ("Warriors" B-side) – 4:42
4. "Nameless and Forgotten" – 5:02
5. "Sister Surprise" (single version) – 4:52
6. "Warriors" (full-length version) – 7:30
- The version of "Poetry and Power" included as a bonus track is longer than the original version from the "Sister Surprise" single. Also, it does not fade out as the B-side version does, due to the remastering process undertaken on the original mastertapes.
- "Nameless and Forgotten", originally titled "Gangster Strut", is a demo recording, featuring elements which were later developed into "Sister Surprise" and "This Is New Love" (the latter being a track on Numan's 1984 studio album Berserker). The existence of the track was forgotten by everyone, including Numan, until it was rediscovered during research for the album reissue. The title "Nameless and Forgotten" was suggested by Numan as a fitting one.

== Personnel ==
Musicians

- Gary Numan – vocals, keyboards, guitar, percussion
- Joe Hubbard – bass guitar
- Cedric Sharpley – drums, percussion
- Bill Nelson – guitar, keyboards, chorus on "Poetry and Power"
- Rrussell Bell – guitar
- Chris Payne – keyboards, viola
- John Webb – keyboards, percussion
- Dick Morrissey – saxophone
- Tracy Ackerman – backing vocals
- Terry Martin – keyboards on "The Tick Tock Man"

Production and artwork

- Gary Numan – producer, audio mixing
- Nick Smith – engineer
- Pete Buhlmann – engineer, audio mixing
- John Webb – assistant engineer
- Mark Brown – assistant engineer
- Ray Staff – audio mastering
- John Dent – audio mastering (remastered version)
- Steve Webbon – CD Layout, additional design
- Steve Malins – sleeve notes
- Patti Burris – make-up
