= Vitar violins =

Musical instrument

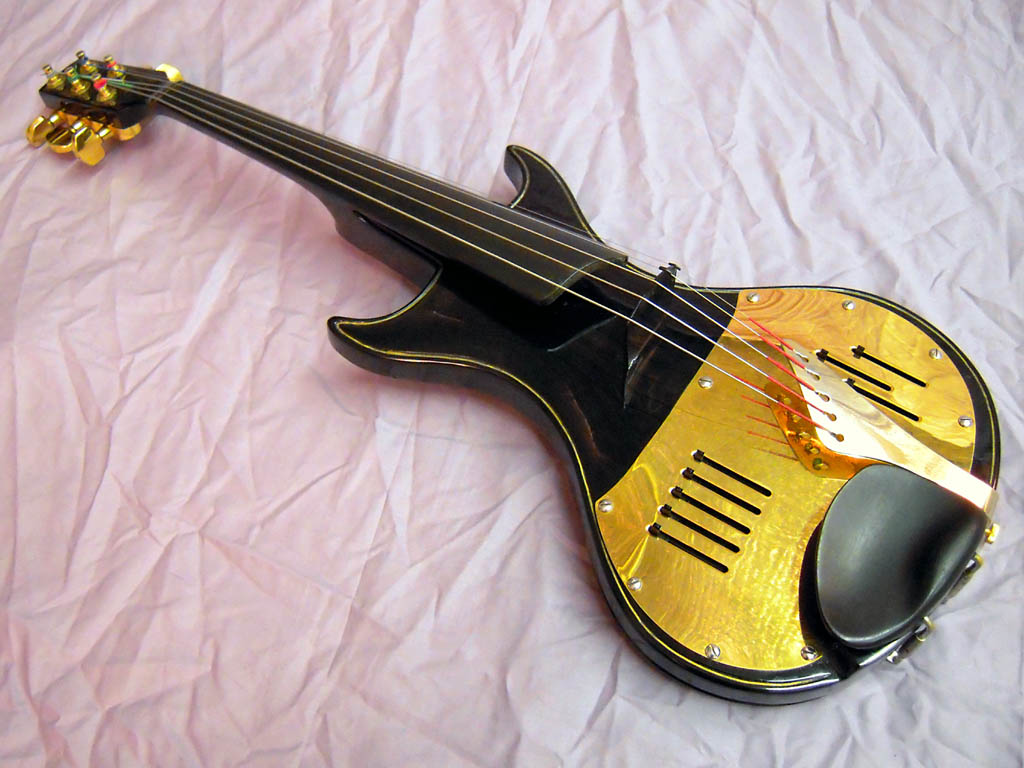

The Vi-tar (or Vitar) was a musical instrument produced by the Exinde/Xinde Corporation in the early 1970s. Advertised as a cross between a violin and guitar, it was essentially a fiberglass-bodied electric violin with some very advanced internal electronics for the time.

== History ==
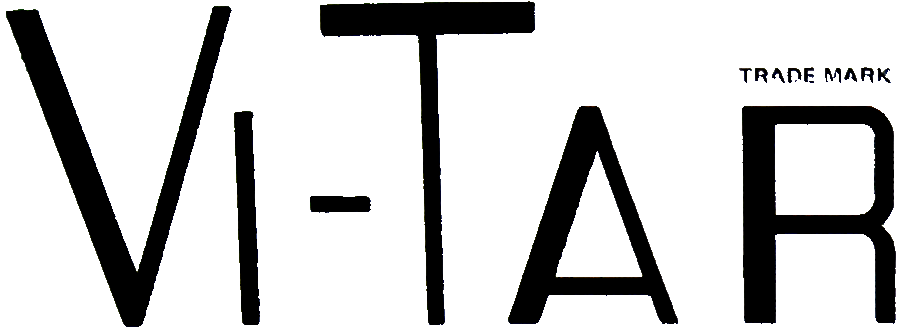

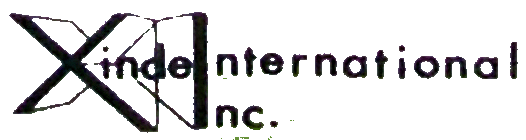

The Vi-Tar was designed and marketed by Spencer Lee Larrison of the Exinde Corporation (Later the Xinde Corporation) in the early 1970s. Advertised as being designed "by a member of the Boston Symphony Orchestra and a graduate of the Massachusetts Institute of Technology", it incorporated very advanced onboard electronics with active volume control for each string, a 'mute-tone' control and a built-in distortion called the "DynaFUZZ". Exact production dates and quantities are unknown. The basic design was patented in September 1972.

== Construction ==
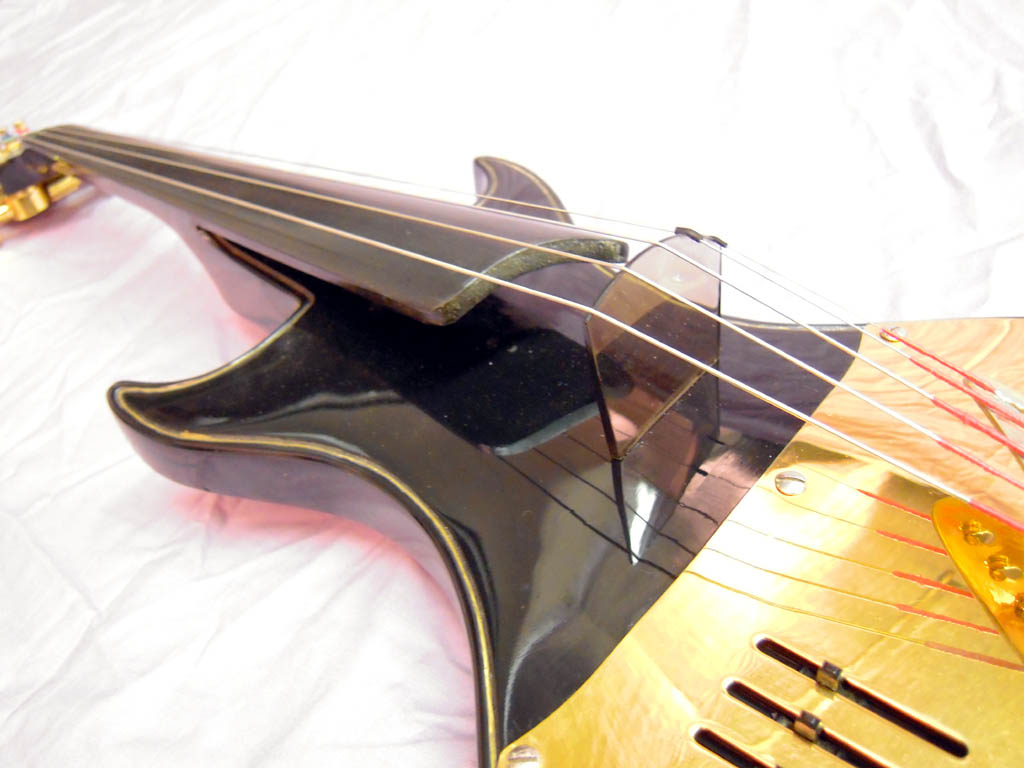

The body of the Vi-tar is a hand-molded fiberglass shell with roughly the same footprint as a standard violin. The upper 2 bouts are cut away to allow easier access to higher positions. It was designed to allow any standard chinrest and shoulder rest to be used. It was available in either a 4 string version, or a 5 string violin/viola combination in a variety of color combinations.

The controls include separate volume controls for each string, a 'mute-tone', master volume and "DynaFUZZ" control. The bridge is a solid piece of acrylic and the magnetic pickups are built into fingerboard, allowing for the individual volume controls. The DynaFUZZ is an onboard distortion circuit.

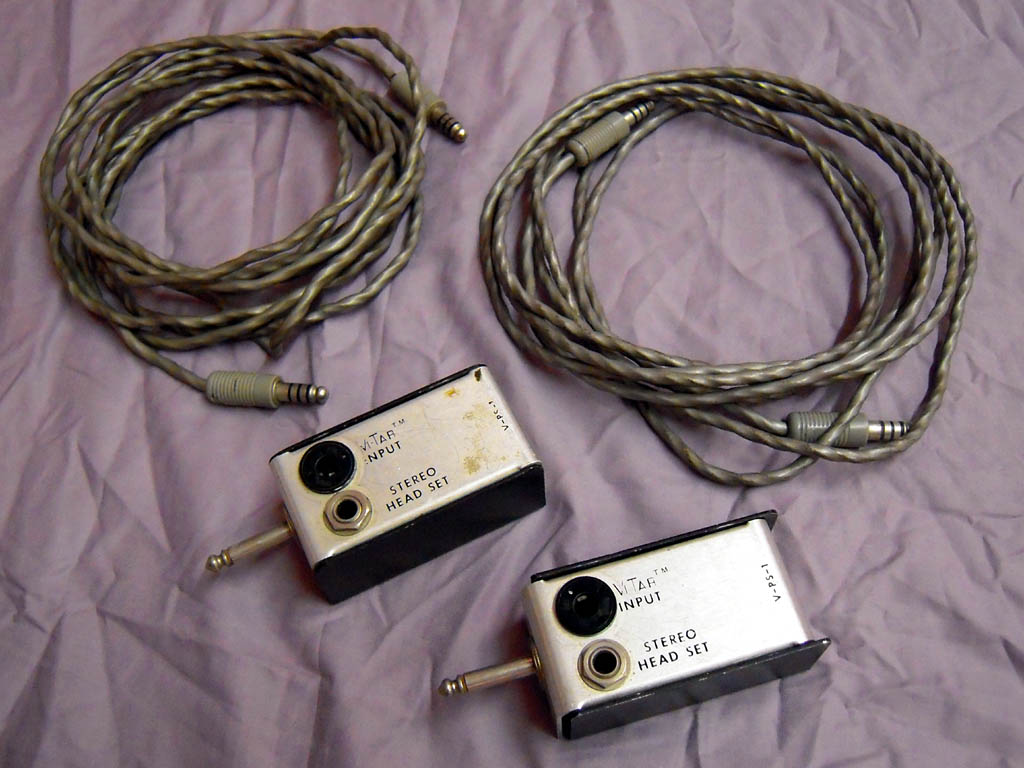

The electronics are powered by an external 18v battery box and the power is sent through the cable using a 4 conductor cable terminating in U174/U (TP120) connectors. The battery box also has the output to run to an amplifier or headphones.

== Players ==
The Vi-tar is listed on many album credits, but by far the most well known player was John Franklin "Ellington" Blair. John Blair was an improvisational jazz violinist who primarily used a Vi-tar violin throughout his career. He released 4 albums of his own, but also played on many others with artists such as Leon Thomas, Richie Havens and Lalo Schifrin. His 2 main Vi-tars were a white 4 string model he named 'Cleopatra' and a black 5 string named 'Nefertiti'.

Other known Vi-tar players:

- Siegfried Carver of the band Pavlov's Dog
- Paul Bunker - former Hands violinist.
- Mietek Glinkowski of the Mietek Glinkowski Jazz Ensemble
- Scarlet Rivera
- Jean Luc Ponty
- Michal Urbaniak
- Marc Bélanger
- Richard Lee of Sidewinder and Dragon
- Miklós Both
- Russell Bell of Dramatis (on For Future Reference)
- John Blair
