= Resonator (Pioneer of Sound) =

Compilation album by Gary Numan
- Released: 15 March 2004
- Genre: Industrial rock, darkwave
- Length: 57:09
- Label: Psychobaby; PBZCD08
- Producer: Gary Numan

Gary Numan chronology
Hybrid (2003)	Resonator (Pioneer of Sound) (2004)	Hope Bleeds (2004)

Professional ratings
Review scores
Source	Rating
AllMusic	2/5 stars

Resonator (Pioneer of Sound) is a compilation album by Gary Numan comprising tracks from the Exposure and Hybrid albums and the "Crazier" single. In addition, two tracks saw their first release on CD.

Numan himself expressed dissatisfaction with this release, and had the album deleted.

== Track listing ==
1. "Exposure" - 2:42 (from the album Exposure)
2. "Crazier" (Rico Slide Mix) - 4:46 (from CD2 of the UK single)
3. "Big Black Sea" - 5:31 (from CD2 of the UK single)
4. "Ancients" - 5:31 (from the album Hybrid)
5. "Me! I Disconnect From You" - 4:42 (from the album Hybrid)
6. "Cars" - 4:34 (from the album Hybrid)
7. "Down in the Park" - 4:27 (from the album Hybrid)
8. "Are 'Friends' Electric?" (Greyed Out Electronic Mix) - 5:37 (previously unreleased)
9. "Everyday I Die" - 4:21 (from the album Exposure)
10. "All I Know" - 4:28 (previously unreleased on CD)
11. "Crazier" (Steve Osborne Mix) - 3:21 (from CD1 of the UK single)
12. "Ancients" (Grayed Out Mix) - 7:09 (from CD1 of the UK single)
