= Sheila Ming-Burgess =

Bermudian international fashion model and actress

Sheila Ming-Burgess is a Bermudian international fashion model and actress. She appeared in music videos for Duran Duran and Whitney Houston.

== Biography ==
Ming-Burgess grew up in the Devonshire Parish in Bermuda. After leaving school, she worked in a shop. She began her modelling career when a fashion photographer spotted her at the Hamilton Princess and Beach Club in Pembroke Parish.

During the 1970s, Ming-Burgess was named Mode Avante Garde Magazine's Model of the Year. She modelled for designers including Armani, Chanel, Dior, Givenchy, Gottex, Missoni, Oscar de la Renta, Ralph Lauren, Valentino, Ungaro, Donna Karen, Karl Lagerfeld and in magazines such as Preview.

Ming-Burgess appeared in music videos, including the videos for She's Got Claws by Gary Numan in 1981, Hungry Like the Wolf by Duran Duran in 1982, and Saving All My Love for You by Whitney Houston in 1985.

At Bermuda Day in 2013, Ming-Burgess was Grand Marshal. She has also been honoured at the Bermuda Fashion Festival.
