= Southam Zoo =

Former zoo in England

Coordinates: 52.253632°N 1.376838°W

Southam Zoo was a small zoo located just east of Southam, Warwickshire, England.

It was started as a private zoo on a farm run by Leslie Clews and his wife Pauline, with their sons, Terry and Brian. In 1964 it was featured in a short film made by British Pathé. The zoo was opened to the public in 1966, and continued to be run by the family until Leslie's death when it was sold to Raymond Graham Jones and renamed Southam Exotic Cats.

The zoo was the filming location of the music video for Gary Numan's 1981 single She's Got Claws. It was closed to the public in 1985 with many of the animals re-housed at Twycross Zoo. On its site now stands a Mediterranean restaurant, a hotel and housing.
