= Stormtrooper in Drag =

Single by Paul Gardiner

from the album Dance (reissue)
- B-side: "Night Talk"
- Released: July 1981
- Recorded: Rock City Studios, Shepperton 1981
- Genre: New wave
- Length: 4:48
- Label: Beggars Banquet; BEG61 (7"), BEG61T (12")
- Songwriters: Paul Gardiner, Gary Numan
- Producer: Gary Numan

Paul Gardiner singles chronology
"Stormtrooper in Drag" (1981)	"Venus in Furs" (1984)

Gary Numan singles chronology
"This Wreckage" (1980)	"Stormtrooper in Drag" (1981)	"She's Got Claws" (1981)

"Stormtrooper in Drag" is the debut single by Paul Gardiner, who was the bass player in Gary Numan's backing band (and in Numan's first band, Tubeway Army). Numan is featured on the single as a co-composer, producer, musician and vocalist.

== Production background ==
Though the single was released under Gardiner's name alone in 1981, it is often credited as Paul Gardiner featuring Gary Numan, and appears on a number of Numan's compilation albums. Numan not only played on and produced the recording but also co-composed and sang lead vocals. It was published by Numan Music and released by Numan's then-current label, Beggars Banquet.

The track was the first product released by Numan, or any of the former members of his backing band, following his 'farewell' concerts at Wembley Arena in April 1981. It also marked the first time in their four years of working together that the friends and former Tubeway Army bandmates had collaborated in the writing of a published song. The result was a departure from the electropop sound that had been Numan's trademark, featuring a vocal performance and sonic textures that foreshadowed his next album, Dance. Gardiner and Numan were credited with guitar and bass, respectively, contrary to their usual practice; both also played synthesizers while Numan's adopted brother, John Webb, played drums.

The single made No. 49 in the UK charts in 1981. The 12" cut was a promo-only version on standard black vinyl; its tracks, their mixes and durations, were identical to the 7" single.

== B-side ==
The B-side, "Night Talk", was another Gardiner/Numan co-composition which, unlike the A-side, would appear on Numan's September 1981 studio album, Dance. Whereas "Stormtrooper in Drag" featured conventional percussion, "Night Talk" made extensive use of a drum machine, the Linn LM-1. Both songs referenced drugs, the former describing "needles in arms", the latter concerning a man dealing with a lover who is an addict (Gardiner was himself a heroin user, while Numan always claimed abstinence from drugs).

== Versions ==
"Stormtrooper in Drag" is included on numerous Gary Numan albums including the CD reissue of Dance and the compilations New Man Numan: The Best of Gary Numan (1982), Exhibition (1987) and The Premier Hits (1996). A live version appears on his album Dark Light (1995); this was recorded in 1994, the tenth anniversary of Gardiner's death (Numan also played live the B-side, "Night Talk", as a 20th anniversary memorial in 2004). It was covered by Saint Etienne for the Numan tribute album Random (1997); an edited version of this performance also appeared on their album Continental. Terre Thaemlitz recorded a piano version on the tribute album Replicas Rubato (1999).

== Track listing ==
1. "Stormtrooper in Drag" (Paul Gardiner, Gary Numan) – 4:48
2. "Night Talk" (Gardiner, Numan) – 4:19

== Production credits ==
- Producers:
  - Gary Numan
- Musicians:
  - Paul Gardiner: guitar, keyboards (ARP Odyssey), backing vocals
  - Gary Numan: vocals, keyboards (ARP Odyssey), bass, guitar, Linn LM-1 ("Night Talk")
  - John Webb: drums ("Stormtrooper in Drag")
  - Sean Lynch: Linn LM-1 ("Night Talk")

== Saint Etienne Version ==
The band Saint Etienne recorded a cover of Stormtrooper in Drag for the Gary Numan tribute compilation Random_(album), released in June of 1997. An edited version of the track was subsequently released on their Japanese collection Continental_(album).
