= For Future Reference =

Studio album by Dramatis
- Released: 4 December 1981
- Recorded: Ridge Farm Studio, Surrey
- Genre: Synthpop
- Label: The Rocket Record Company
- Producer: Dramatis, Simon Heyworth

The Dramatis Project
- Cover for the 2000 reissue

Singles from For Future Reference
- 1. "Ex Luna Scientia" Released: 8 May 1981; 2. "Oh! Twenty Twenty Five" Released: 24 July 1981; 3. "No-One Lives Forever" Released: 11 September 1981; 4. "Love Needs No Disguise" Released: 27 November 1981

Professional ratings
Review scores
Source	Rating
AllMusic	1/5 stars

For Future Reference is the only studio album released by the British synth-pop band Dramatis. The album itself failed to reach the UK Albums Chart, however, one of the four singles released from the album, "Love Needs No Disguise", with Gary Numan providing vocals, reached No.33 on the UK Singles Chart. The other singles from the album were "Ex Luna Scientia", "Oh! Twenty Twenty Five" (titled "Oh! 2025" on the album) and "No-One Lives Forever". The album was reissued on CD in 2000 and 2002 and retitled as The Dramatis Project. This reissue was credited to Tubeway Army featuring Gary Numan, despite Numan's only contribution being the vocal to "Love Needs No Disguise". A further CD reissue in 2003, under the title Future, was again credited to Tubeway Army.

The album was made available again in 2014 as a digital download only, this time under the title Terrestrial Channels and with Numan as the sole artist credit.

The album was eventually reissued as a remastered and expanded double CD edition released by Cherry Red Records on 22 April 2022, with Disc One including the original album track listing, plus eight bonus tracks consisting of 7-inch and 12-inch versions of singles and B-sides. Disc Two includes seven 7-inch single mixes and eight tracks recorded "In Concert - BBC Paris Theatre, London May 1982".

Although three new singles were released during 1982, a follow-up album to "For Future Reference" didn't eventuate:

- "Face on the Wall" (released 5 February 1982)
- "The Shame" (released 21 May 1982)
- "I Can See Her Now" (released 15 October 1982 and charted at No.57 on the UK Singles Chart)

== Track listing ==
=== Original LP track listing ===
All tracks are written by Dramatis.

Side One
No.	Title	Length
1.	"Oh! 2025"	4:32
2.	"Human Sacrifice"	3:55
3.	"I Only Find Rewind"	4:17
4.	"No-One Lives Forever"	3:55
5.	"Love Needs No Disguise"	4:44

Side Two
No.	Title	Length
6.	"Turn"	5:19
7.	"Take Me Home"	5:26
8.	"On Reflection"	3:28
9.	"Ex Luna Scientia"	5:02

=== 2022 Remastered 2CD ===
Disc One "Bonus Tracks"
No.	Title	Originally from	Length
10.	"Lady D.J. (12" Version)"	B-side "Ex Luna Scientia" 12" single	4:07
11.	"The Curtain"	B-side "Oh! Twenty Twenty Five" 7" single	4:05
12.	"Face on the Wall"	A-side non-album 7" single	3:40
13.	"Pomp and Stompandstamp"	B-side "Face on the Wall" 7" single	4:07
14.	"The Shame (12" - Dance Party Mix I)"	A-side non-album 12" single	5:31
15.	"I Can See Her Now (12" Version)"	A-side non-album 12" single	6:08
16.	"One Step Ahead (12" Version)"	B-side "I Can See Her Now" 12" single	3:29
17.	"No-One Lives Forever (12" - Remixed Long Version)"	A-side 12" single	5:50

Disc Two "Single Mixes"
No.	Title	Originally from	Length
1.	"For Future Reference (Selections from the forthcoming album 'For Future Reference' TRAIN 18): "Turn"/"I Only Find Rewind"/"On Reflection"/"Human Sacrifice""	B-side "No-One Lives Forever" 7" and 12" singles	4:26
2.	"Ex Luna Scientia (7" Version)"	A-side 7" single	3:57
3.	"Lady D.J. (7" Version)"	B-side "Ex Luna Scientia" 7" single	3:27
4.	"Oh! Twenty Twenty Five (7" Version)"	A-side 7" single	3:32
5.	"The Shame (7" Version)"	A-side non-album 7" single	3:22
6.	"I Can See Her Now (7" Version)"	A-side non-album 7" single	3:42
7.	"One Step Ahead (7" Version)"	B-side "I Can See Her Now" 7" single	2:37

Disc Two "In Concert - BBC Paris Theatre, London May 1982"
No.	Title	Length
8.	"Sand and Stone"	5:52
9.	"I Only Find Rewind"	3:41
10.	"Face on the Wall"	3:46
11.	"I Can See Her Now"	2:22
12.	"Turn"	5:01
13.	"Love Needs No Disguise"	4:15
14.	"Pomp and Stompandstamp"	3:01
15.	"The Shame"	3:37

== Personnel ==
- Chris Payne – viola, keyboards, cornamuse, recorders, backing vocals
- Rrussell Bell – guitar, Chapman Stick, Moog Liberation, Vi-tar, abstract sax, backing vocals
- Cedric Sharpley – drums, percussion, synth drums, backing vocals
- Denis Haines – piano, keyboards, backing vocals, abstract vocal noises
- The Big G (Gary Numan) – guest vocal ("Love Needs No Disguise")
- Gus – backing vocals on "I Only Find Rewind" and "No-One Lives Forever" and humping the gear
- Dramatis – producer, arrangements
- Simon Heyworth – producer, engineer
- Simon Smart – engineer
