= I, Assassin =

Studio album by Gary Numan
- Released: 10 September 1982
- Recorded: 1982
- Studios: Rock City Studios (Shepperton, Surrey)
- Genres: New wave; experimental music; funk; synth-pop
- Length: 44:10; 75:10 (CD)
- Label: Beggars Banquet
- Producer: Gary Numan

Gary Numan chronology
Dance (1981)	I, Assassin (1982)	Warriors (1983)

Singles from I, Assassin
- 1. "Music for Chameleons" Released: 26 February 1982; 2. "We Take Mystery (To Bed)" Released: 11 June 1982; 3. "White Boys and Heroes" Released: 20 August 1982

Professional ratings
Review scores
Source	Rating
AllMusic	2.5/5 stars
Smash Hits	4/10

I, Assassin is the fourth solo studio album by the English new wave musician Gary Numan, released on 10 September 1982 by Beggars Banquet. It peaked at No. 8 on the UK Album Chart. Three singles were released from the album: "Music for Chameleons", "We Take Mystery (To Bed)" and "White Boys and Heroes", all of which reached the UK Top 20 ("We Take Mystery" peaked at No. 9, and is Numan's last Top 10 single to date).

== Overview ==
Following Numan's previous studio album, Dance (1981), I, Assassin is described as "a record fiercely propelled by powerful rhythms in songs laced with an earthy cynicism."

Numan recalled that an important factor during the album's recording was the contribution made by fretless bassist Pino Palladino:

He was brilliant. I had never heard playing like it...He came up with stunning bass lines, song after song. I leaned on him heavily during the making of the album. I pushed his playing to the forefront of the tracks and, inadvertently, created a new style. It was one of the first times that the fretless bass had been used as the lead melody instrument, allowing the album to be atmospheric, dreamy and funky.

Most of the album was written and recorded between January and March 1982 following Numan's round-the-world trip in a small aircraft. The 24 year old Numan stated that the round-the-world flight and the experience of a near-death plane crash helped him shape a new opinion of himself and gave him a strong self-confidence that he had not previously had. Later in his career, Numan said of I, Assassin: "I still think it's one of the best albums I've made."

The heavily percussive sound made songs such as "Music for Chameleons" and a special US remix of "White Boys and Heroes" unexpected successes in the American club scene, and in October 1982, Numan embarked on a US tour.

== Critical reception and chart performance ==
The album received poor reviews in the British music press. Smash Hits reviewer Neil Tennant wrote: ""Music for Chameleons" still retains an air of mystery and some evening appeal but most of this album is as dismal, empty and bereft of ideas as the music of older doom merchants Pink Floyd and their peeling "Wall"."

The album peaked at the 8th position, spending 6 weeks on the UK charts, making it less successful than Numan's previous studio albums.

== Releases ==
I, Assassin was originally released on vinyl album and cassette in 1982. It was released on CD in 1993, as a double CD packaged with Numan's 1980 album Telekon (Beggars Banquet had reissued all eight of Numan's studio albums that were released on the label, including the two Tubeway Army albums, as double CD sets). I, Assassin was released on CD by itself in 2002. Both CD releases contain seven bonus tracks.

== Track listing ==
All songs are written by Gary Numan.

Side A

1. "White Boys and Heroes" – 6:23
2. "War Songs" – 5:05
3. "A Dream of Siam" – 6:13
4. "Music for Chameleons" – 6:06

Side B

5. "This Is My House" – 4:52
6. "I, Assassin" – 5:26
7. "The 1930's Rust" – 3:55
8. "We Take Mystery (To Bed)" – 6:10

CD bonus tracks

9. "War Games" – 3:55
10. "Glitter and Ash" – 4:42
11. "The Image Is" – 5:55
12. "This House Is Cold" – 5:27
13. "Noise Noise" – 3:49
14. "We Take Mystery (early version)" – 5:58
15. "Bridge? What Bridge?" – 4:22
- "War Games" was originally released as a B-side on the 7" and 12" single versions of "White Boys and Heroes."
- "Glitter and Ash" was originally released as a B-side on the 12" single version of "White Boys and Heroes."
- "The Image Is" was originally released as a B-side on the 7" and 12" single versions of "We Take Mystery (To Bed)."
- "Noise Noise" was originally released as a B-side on the 7" and 12" single versions of "Music for Chameleons."
- "Bridge? What Bridge?" was originally released as a B-side on the 12" single version of "Music for Chameleons."
- "We Take Mystery" (early version) was originally released as a B-side on the UK 12" version of "We Take Mystery (To Bed)." It is presumably the version of the song that was recorded during the Dance sessions and was originally intended for inclusion on that album.

== Personnel ==
Credits are adapted from the I, Assassin liner notes.

- Gary Numan – vocals; synthesisers; guitar
- Roger Mason – synthesizers
- Pino Palladino – fretless bass
- Chris Slade – drums; percussion
- John Webb – percussion
- Mike – saxophone; harmonica
- David Van Day – handclaps on "Noise Noise"
- Thereza Bazar – backing vocals on "Noise Noise"
- Nick Robson – backing vocals on "Bridge? What Bridge?"
- Michelle Adams – backing vocals on "Bridge? What Bridge?"
- Mick Karn – "We Take Mystery (To Bed)" early version 1981 + drunken backing vocals on "Bridge? What Bridge?"

Production and artwork

- Gary Numan – producer
- Nick Smith – engineer
- Sean Lynch – assistant engineer
- Geoff Howes – photography
