= Warriors (Gary Numan song) =

Single by Gary Numan

from the album Warriors
- Released: 26 August 1983
- Recorded: 1982
- Studio: Rock City Studios (Shepperton)
- Genre: New wave
- Length: 4:08
- Label: Beggars Banquet; BEG 95 (7"), BEG 95 T (12")
- Songwriter: Gary Numan
- Producer: Gary Numan

Gary Numan singles chronology
"White Boys and Heroes" (1982)	"Warriors" (1983)	"Sister Surprise" (1983)

Music video
- "Warriors" on YouTube

"Warriors" is a song written and recorded by the English new wave musician Gary Numan, released in 1983 as both a 7" and 12" single from his fifth solo studio album, Warriors. Numan promoted the song on many popular television shows such as The Saturday Show and Crackerjack. It peaked at No. 20 on the UK singles chart, and was Numan's final Top 20 hit until 2003.

Of the song Numan commented: "Warriors was about how I felt being a pop star more or less, I felt I was losing it and slipping down the ladder of success. The line "The ghost of the white faced clown" was a direct reference back to the old images that I'd had before and I wanted to establish that was all done and gone, I was over my Star Wars, Buck Rogers type period".

The music video for the song shown on Top of the Pops shows Numan's love of flying and his new Mad Max-style image. He commented: "I had a lot of fun making the video for the single, sort of a mix between joy and terror. I think 'Warriors' is probably by far my favourite song on the album".

== Track listing ==
- 12" single
1. "Warriors" – 5:51
2. "My Car Slides (1)" – 3:05
3. "My Car Slides (2)" – 4:45
- 7" single
1. "Warriors" – 4:08
2. "My Car Slides (1)" – 3:01

== Chart performance ==
Chart (1983)	Peak position
UK Singles (OCC)	20
