= Music for Chameleons (song) =

Single by Gary Numan

from the album I, Assassin
- Released: 26 February 1982
- Studio: Rock City Studios (Shepperton)
- Genre: New wave
- Length: 3:40
- Label: Beggars Banquet
- Songwriter: Gary Numan
- Producer: Gary Numan

Gary Numan singles chronology
"Love Needs No Disguise" (1981)	"Music for Chameleons" (1982)	"We Take Mystery (To Bed)" (1982)

Music video
- "Music for Chameleons" on YouTube

"Music for Chameleons" is a song by the English new wave musician Gary Numan from his fourth solo studio album, I, Assassin (1982). The single peaked at No. 19 on the UK singles chart. The song was composed during Numan's round-the-world trip in a light aircraft, which he undertook together with another pilot. The song is highly unusual in using fretless bass as the main melody instrument.

== Track listing ==
Taken from UK releases.

- 7" single (Beg.70)
1. Music for Chameleons – 3:40
2. Noise Noise – 3:44
- 12" single (Beg.70(T))
1. Music for Chameleons (Extended Version)
2. Noise Noise
3. Bridge? What Bridge?

There are at least three released mixes; the 7-inch edit (3:35) (also available on The Best of Gary Numan 1978–1983), the 12-inch "Extended Version" (6:57) (available on Exposure) and the album mix running at 6:06.

== Personnel ==
Taken from 7" UK release.

Music for Chameleons

- Gary Numan – vocals, keyboards
- Pino Palladino – bass guitar
- Chris Slade – drums

Noise Noise

- Gary Numan – vocals, instruments
- Thereza Bazar – vocals
- David Van Day – helpful hints

== Charts ==
Chart (1982)	Peak position
UK singles chart	19

== In popular culture ==
"Music for Chameleons" features in the fifth episode of the second series of the 2002 BBC sitcom I'm Alan Partridge, "I Know What Alan Did Last Summer", when Alan plays air bass to the track while in his sad trailer.
