= Telekon =

Studio album by Gary Numan
- Released: 5 September 1980
- Recorded: December 1979 – 1980
- Studios: Rock City Studios (Shepperton); Matrix Studios (London)
- Genres: New wave; electronic; synth-pop
- Length: 49:54
- Label: Beggars Banquet
- Producer: Gary Numan

Gary Numan chronology
| The Pleasure Principle (1979) | Telekon (1980) | Living Ornaments '79 (1981) |

Singles from Telekon
- 1. "We Are Glass" Released: 16 May 1980; 2. "I Die: You Die" Released: 22 August 1980; 3. "This Wreckage" Released: 12 December 1980

Professional ratings
Review scores
| Source | Rating |
|---|---|
| AllMusic | 4.5/5 stars |
| Pitchfork | 8.6/10 |
| Rolling Stone | 3/5 stars |
| Smash Hits | 7/10 |
| Spin | 8/10 stars |

Telekon is the second solo studio album by the English new wave musician Gary Numan. It debuted at the top of the UK Albums Chart in September 1980, making it his third consecutive (and to date, final) No. 1 album. It was also the third and final studio release of what Numan retrospectively termed the "machine" section of his career, following Replicas and The Pleasure Principle (both 1979).

== Music and lyrics ==
In contrast to Numan's previous album The Pleasure Principle, Telekon featured heavy use of guitars and a richer, more complex sound with a broadened use of different synthesizers in combination with viola and violin. The album's sound ranges from heavier tracks such as "I'm an Agent" and "The Joy Circuit" to more sombre, melancholic songs such as "Sleep by Windows" and "Remember I Was Vapour". Lyrically the album mixed dystopian themes on tracks such as "I Dream of Wires" and "The Joy Circuit", with more personal lyrics such as "Remind Me to Smile" and "Please Push No More" that dealt with Numan's feelings about his sudden fame and relationship with his fans. Several songs such as "Remember I Was Vapour" and "Please Push No More" suggests a goodbye, hinting at Numan's retirement from live work a few months later. "The whole album's got that little hint of goodbye in it", Numan confirmed in a 1981 interview, "In 'This Wreckage' the Japanese writing says 'I leave you'."

== Title and recording ==
In an interview with Smash Hits magazine in November 1979 Numan hinted on initial plans that his next album Telekon was going to be about telekinesis.

The recording of the album was reported to be nearly finished already in December 1979, but the release was held back to September 1980 due to Numan's one album a year contract with Beggars Banquet. The sessions also yielded the song "A Game Called Echo" which was not included on the finished album.

== Releases and promoting ==
Telekon was released in September 1980. To boost initial sales in the UK, on first release the album came with a free single, in a plain black sleeve, including two live recordings from 'The Touring Principle' tour; "Remember I Was Vapour" and "On Broadway". A year later, in an attempt to further boost sales, the album came with a free poster in the UK using a photo taken from the main Telekon photo-shoot. The cassette release included the singles "We Are Glass" and "I Die: You Die" which were not on the vinyl LP.

A number of Dutch releases were pressed on coloured vinyl. The US, Canadian and Australian releases replaced the track "Sleep by Windows" with "I Die: You Die". The album was released on vinyl and cassette in Japan.

=== Singles ===
Telekon was preceded by the two singles "We Are Glass" and "I Die: You Die", which were only included on the cassette release of Telekon and on later reissues. The album's opening number, "This Wreckage" succeeded the album and upon its release in December 1980, the single peaked at No. 20 in the UK. Numan later admitted that, regardless of its merits as a song, it was a "bloody stupid single". The live version of "Remember I Was Vapour", released as a bonus single with the UK album, was released as a 12" single in Germany with the studio version on the B-side. "Remind Me to Smile" was released as a US single with "I Dream of Wires" on the B-side. "Remember I Was Vapour" was also released as a 7" single with "On Broadway (Live)" as the B-side.

=== The Teletour ===
From September to November 1980, Numan toured the UK and North America in support of Telekon. The tour was followed by three "farewell concerts" at Wembley Arena in April 1981 with guest Nash the Slash.

=== Classic Album Tour and Micromusic DVD ===
In December 2006, Numan undertook a Telekon "Classic Album" tour, comprising four concerts in the UK in which he played all the songs from the Telekon album, as well as its associated singles and B-sides. On the 2CD EKO: The Telekon 06 Audio Programme (sold at the 2006 Telekon gigs and from Numan's website), Numan discussed (with interviewer Steve Malins) the making of Telekon, revealing that it is his favourite of his "early albums." Numan followed the 2006 tour with further "Classic Album" tours, for Replicas in 2008 and The Pleasure Principle in 2009.

In 2006, Numan promised fans a DVD release of the 1981 Micromusic video. On his official website in October 2008, Numan announced that the long-lost master tapes of the Micromusic concert had been found, "in excellent condition and, to make things even better, more footage has been found from two other camera positions that were not used on the original version. This new footage will be edited into a new updated version...We expect this to be, with all the extra footage and interviews, a double disc DVD." On 19 March 2010, Numan announced that the Micromusic DVD would be released on 13 April. Micromusic was released on that date as a one-disc DVD; in addition to the concert itself, the DVD featured an hour-long interview with Numan as a special feature.

In June 2025, Numan announced a 45th anniversary 15-city UK tour of Telekon with Dublin and Belfast added in July.

== Critical reception and legacy ==
Like Numan's previous album, Telekon received a largely hostile reception in the British music press on its release, but has proved to be an influential work cited as a major influence by musicians such as Trent Reznor of Nine Inch Nails and Stephen Merritt of Magnetic Fields.

Upon its release in 1980, Smash Hits reviewer Red Starr found Telekon to be "better than The Pleasure Principle but not so good as Replicas" and that Numan was "recycling old ideas instead of pioneering new ones."

In a retrospective review for Pitchfork Media in 1999, Michael Sandlin wrote: "On Telekon, Numan is a master texturalist, skilled in creating synth parts that perfectly coalesce and swim melodically around each other; an interplay much like Television innovated in the mid-1970s using guitars. He works wonders with his arsenal of simple synthesizer effects. He also utilizes acoustic piano, and occasionally integrates electric violas, violins, and flecks of distorted rhythm guitar. And he uses this many- sided approach to optimal effect; the piano and synthesizers trade off carrying melody and countermelody, while some Moog parts are used expressly for atmospheric effect or layered to build the rhythmic girth of a song. Numan's ideas no doubt serve as a template of sorts, and many of these compositions have more than withstood the trials of time. Many of today's legions of sample- happy, MIDI- obsessed nerds claim to have learned a thing or two from Numan's intelligent compositional craft."

== Cultural references ==
NME used the track title "I Dream of Wires" as the name for a fictitious synth-pop act about which they published a series of spoof articles in early 1995, culminating in reports of the alleged band's death in a coach crash in Eastern Europe.

"I Dream of Wires" was covered by English singer Robert Palmer on his 1980 studio album Clues, featuring Numan on keyboards and synthesisers.

"I'm an Agent" was covered by English pop punk band Kenickie as a bonus CD track on CD1 of their January 1997 number 24 hit single "In Your Car".

== Track listing ==
All songs written and composed by Gary Numan except for "Trois Gymnopédies (First Movement)", which is a composition by Erik Satie.

=== LP ===
Side one
| No. | Title | Length |
|---|---|---|
| 1. | "This Wreckage" | 5:26 |
| 2. | "The Aircrash Bureau" | 5:41 |
| 3. | "Telekon" | 4:29 |
| 4. | "Remind Me to Smile" | 4:03 |
| 5. | "Sleep by Windows" (replaced with "I Die: You Die" on North American and other overseas releases) | 4:58 |

Side two
| No. | Title | Length |
|---|---|---|
| 6. | "I'm an Agent" | 4:19 |
| 7. | "I Dream of Wires" | 5:10 |
| 8. | "Remember I Was Vapour" | 5:11 |
| 9. | "Please Push No More" | 5:39 |
| 10. | "The Joy Circuit" | 5:12 |

The vinyl album also included a 7" single:
A-side - "Remember I Was Vapour (Live)"
B-side - "On Broadway (Live)"

=== Cassette ===
Side one
| No. | Title | Length |
|---|---|---|
| 1. | "This Wreckage" | 5:26 |
| 2. | "The Aircrash Bureau" | 5:41 |
| 3. | "Telekon" | 4:29 |
| 4. | "Remind Me to Smile" | 4:03 |
| 5. | "Sleep by Windows" | 4:58 |
| 6. | "We Are Glass" | 4:47 |

Side two
| No. | Title | Length |
|---|---|---|
| 7. | "I'm an Agent" | 4:19 |
| 8. | "I Dream of Wires" | 5:10 |
| 9. | "Remember I Was Vapour" | 5:11 |
| 10. | "Please Push No More" | 5:39 |
| 11. | "The Joy Circuit" | 5:12 |
| 12. | "I Die: You Die" | 3:47 |

=== 1998 CD reissue ===
| No. | Title | Length |
|---|---|---|
| 1. | "This Wreckage" | 5:26 |
| 2. | "The Aircrash Bureau" | 5:41 |
| 3. | "Telekon" | 4:29 |
| 4. | "Remind Me to Smile" (alternative intro to vinyl release) | 4:03 |
| 5. | "Sleep by Windows" | 4:58 |
| 6. | "We Are Glass" | 4:47 |
| 7. | "I'm an Agent" | 4:19 |
| 8. | "I Dream of Wires" | 5:10 |
| 9. | "Remember I Was Vapour" (alternative mix to vinyl release) | 5:11 |
| 10. | "Please Push No More" | 5:39 |
| 11. | "The Joy Circuit" (alternative mix to vinyl release) | 5:12 |

Reissue bonus tracks
| No. | Title | Length |
|---|---|---|
| 12. | "I Die: You Die" (alternative mix to single release) | 3:48 |
| 13. | "A Game Called Echo" | 5:07 |
| 14. | "Photograph" | 2:28 |
| 15. | "Down in the Park" (piano version) | 4:15 |
| 16. | "Trois Gymnopédies" (First Movement) | 2:44 |

- Subsequent digital issues of Telekon revert to the original intro mix for "Remind Me to Smile".

== Charts ==
=== Weekly charts ===
Weekly chart performance for Telekon
| Chart (1980) | Peak position |
|---|---|
| Australian Albums (Kent Music Report) | 24 |
| Canada Top Albums/CDs (RPM) | 53 |
| New Zealand Albums (RMNZ) | 32 |
| UK Albums (Official Charts) | 1 |
| US Billboard 200 | 64 |

=== Year-end charts ===
Year-end chart performance for Telekon
| Chart (1980) | Position |
|---|---|
| UK Albums (OCC) | 59 |

== Personnel ==
Musicians

- Gary Numan – vocals, Minimoog, Polymoog, ARP Pro Soloist, Roland Jupiter-4, Sequential Circuits Prophet-5, Yamaha CP-30, Roland CR-78, Synare, guitar, piano, Minibass
- Paul Gardiner – bass, backing vocals
- Cedric Sharpley – drums, percussion, backing vocals
- Chris Payne – viola, piano, Minimoog, Polymoog, backing vocals
- Russell Bell – guitars, violin, claves, backing vocals
- Denis Haines – Prophet-5, piano, ARP Pro Soloist, Yamaha CP-30, whistle, backing vocals
- John Webb, James Freud, Simple Minds – handclaps
