= Dramatis =

English synth-pop band

- Origin: London, England
- Genres: Synth-pop; new wave
- Years active: 1981–1982; 2013–present
- Label: The Rocket Record Company
- Members: Chris Payne; Rrussell Bell; Denis Haines
- Past members: Cedric Sharpley

Dramatis are an English synth-pop band formed in the early 1980s. Chris Payne (vocals, keyboards), Rrussell Bell (guitars, keyboards), Cedric Sharpley (drums), and Denis Haines (keyboards) were all originally members of Gary Numan's backing band. They formed Dramatis following Numan's announced (but short-lived) retirement from touring in April 1981.

They released seven singles and one album before disbanding in 1982. Two of their singles reached the UK singles chart: the 1981 single with Numan "Love Needs No Disguise" which reached number 33, and the 1982 single "I Can See Her Now" which reached number 57.

In 2012, plans to reunite Dramatis were cancelled following the passing of Cedric Sharpley, who died from a heart attack on 13 March 2012.

In 2019, Rrussell Bell and Chris Payne announced a new Dramatis single called "The Torment of Angels", and that they were working on a second Dramatis album.

== Discography ==
=== Studio albums ===
Year	Album title
1981	For Future Reference (also known as The Dramatis Project): Released: 4 December 1981; Label: The Rocket Record Company; Format: LP, MC

=== Singles ===
Year	Title	UK chart position	Album
1981	"Ex Luna Scientia"	—	For Future Reference
1981	"Oh! Twenty Twenty Five"	—	For Future Reference
1981	"No-One Lives Forever"	—	For Future Reference
1981	"Love Needs No Disguise" (with Gary Numan)	33	For Future Reference
1982	"Face on the Wall"	—	Non-album singles
1982	"The Shame"	—	Non-album singles
1982	"I Can See Her Now"	57	Non-album singles
2020	"A Torment of Angels"	—	Non-album singles

=== Album appearances ===
Year	Artist	Album	UK chart position	Notes
1982	Gary Numan	New Man Numan - The Best of Gary Numan	45	"Love Needs No Disguise" features as part of compilation album
1987	Gary Numan	Exhibition	43	"Love Needs No Disguise" features as part of compilation album
1990	Gary Numan	Asylum 2 (Japan-only release)	—	"Love Needs No Disguise" features as part of compilation album
1993	Gary Numan	Best of Gary Numan 1978-83	70	"Love Needs No Disguise" features as part of compilation album
1996	Gary Numan	The Premier Hits	21	"Love Needs No Disguise" features as part of compilation album
2002	Gary Numan	Exposure	44	"Love Needs No Disguise" features as part of compilation album
2012	Gary Numan	Machine Music Live	—	"Love Needs No Disguise" was performed live with the original lineup of Dramatis with the exception of Cedric Sharpley, who died only a few months prior. It was played in dedication of his passing.
