= This Wreckage =

Single by Gary Numan

from the album Telekon
- B-side: "Photograph"
- Released: 12 December 1980
- Recorded: 1980
- Studio: Rock City Studios (Shepperton)
- Genre: Pop rock; synth-pop
- Length: 5:26
- Label: Beggars Banquet; BEG 50
- Songwriter: Gary Numan
- Producer: Gary Numan

Gary Numan singles chronology
"I Die: You Die" (1980)	"This Wreckage" (1980)	"Stormtrooper in Drag" (1981)

Official audio
- "This Wreckage" on YouTube

"This Wreckage" is a song written and performed by the English new wave musician Gary Numan. It was featured as the opening track on his second solo studio album Telekon (1980).

"This Wreckage" followed the singles "We Are Glass" and "I Die: You Die", which were only included on the cassette release of Telekon and on later reissues. Released on 12 December 1980 by Beggars Banquet Records, "This Wreckage" reached No. 20 on the UK singles chart. Numan later admitted that, regardless of its merits as a song, it was a "bloody stupid single". The song was later described as "possibly the strangest Top 20 hit of all time", a fore-runner of "the slightly one-note anti-religious goth-industrial music" Numan would favour later in his career.
