= We Take Mystery (To Bed) =

Single by Gary Numan

from the album I, Assassin
- B-side: "The Image Is"
- Released: 11 June 1982
- Studio: Rock City Studios (Shepperton, Surrey)
- Genre: New wave; funk; synth-pop
- Length: 3:42
- Label: Beggars Banquet
- Songwriter: Gary Numan
- Producer: Gary Numan

Gary Numan singles chronology
"Music for Chameleons" (1982)	"We Take Mystery (To Bed)" (1982)	"White Boys and Heroes" (1982)

Music video
- "We Take Mystery (To Bed)" on YouTube

"We Take Mystery (To Bed)" is a song written and recorded by the English new wave musician Gary Numan, the second single released from his fourth solo studio album, I, Assassin (1982). It peaked at No. 9 on the UK Singles Chart (the highest of three Top 20 hits from the album) and it remains Numan's last Top 10 hit.

Originally set for release in May 1982, its release was delayed by a month due to "production difficulties". The track features the Welsh musicians Chris Slade on drums, and Pino Palladino on bass guitar, with all other instruments played by Numan himself.

The song was written about an ex-girlfriend of Numan's at the time named Debbie Doran, who is cryptically referred to in the first verse as "D.E.B". According to Numan's biography, she was at a club with her sister and it was inevitable that he would fancy one of them. Either would then charm him into getting romantically involved before selling their story about him to the press.

== Critical reception ==
Writing in Record Mirror, reviewer John Shearlaw stated: "A joke, it's got to be", finding the song's only merit in "the trendy bassline", concluding that, "The game's up..".

== Track listing ==
7" single

1. "We Take Mystery (To Bed)"
2. "The Image Is"

12" single

1. "We Take Mystery (To Bed)" (Extended)
2. "The Image Is"
3. "We Take Mystery (To Bed)" (Early Version)

12" US version

1. "White Boys and Heroes" (Remix)
2. "We Take Mystery (To Bed)" (Extended)
