= Love Needs No Disguise =

Single by Dramatis and Gary Numan

from the album For Future Reference
- B-side: "Take Me Home"; "Face to Face"
- Released: 27 November 1981
- Recorded: Ridge Farm Studios, Rusper
- Genre: New wave
- Length: 4:36
- Label: Beggars Banquet
- Songwriters: Ced Sharpley, Chris Payne, Denis Haines, Russell Bell
- Producers: Dramatis, Simon Heyworth

Gary Numan singles chronology
"She's Got Claws" (1981)	"Love Needs No Disguise" (1981)	"Music for Chameleons" (1982)

Dramatis singles chronology
"No-One Lives Forever" (1981)	"Love Needs No Disguise" (1981)	"Face On The Wall" (1982)

"Love Needs No Disguise" is a single by Dramatis featuring Gary Numan on vocals. It was released on 27 November 1981 by Beggars Banquet and immediately charted at number 33 on the UK Singles Chart. The track was included on the Dramatis debut album, For Future Reference, released the following week on 4 December 1981 by The Rocket Record Company. The track had its live debut during the 40-date "Warriors Tour 83" of the UK over September-November 1983. Of the song, Numan recalled:

"This was just the break they needed; I didn’t have anything to do with the writing of the song and I had a great time recording the video"

== Track listing ==
Side one
No.	Title	Writer(s)	Artist	Length
1.	"Love Needs No Disguise"	Ced Sharpley, Chris Payne, Denis Haines, Rrussell Bell	Gary Numan and Dramatis	4:36

Side two
No.	Title	Writer(s)	Artist	Length
2.	"Take Me Home"	Sharpley, Payne, Haines, Bell	Dramatis	5:36
3.	"Face to Face" (12" only)	Gary Numan	Gary Numan	3:41

== Charts ==
Chart (1981)	Peak position
UK Singles (OCC)	33
