= She's Got Claws =

Single by Gary Numan

from the album Dance
- B-side: "I Sing Rain"
- Released: 21 August 1981
- Recorded: Rock City Studios, Shepperton 1981
- Genre: Electro-funk
- Length: 4:46
- Label: Beggars Banquet; BEG62 (7"), BEG62T (12")
- Songwriter: Gary Numan
- Producer: Gary Numan

Gary Numan singles chronology
| "Stormtrooper in Drag" (1981) | "She's Got Claws" (1981) | "Love Needs No Disguise" (1981) |

"She’s Got Claws" is a 1981 song by Gary Numan. It was the first and only single released from his 1981 album Dance. The song signalled a different musical style for Numan, featuring jazz-influenced saxophone and fretless bass, as well as a new image comprising trilby hat and pinstriped suit, inspired by Humphrey Bogart and Howard Hughes.

== Background ==
An obscure single in July 1981 called "Stormtrooper in Drag", released under the name of his friend and bass-player Paul Gardiner but co-written and sung by Numan, provided a foretaste of the latter's new sound, far removed from the science fiction influenced synthpop that had made him a star. Aside from being a departure from previous material, "She's Got Claws" was unusual among Numan's jazz-style output in utilising the sax as lead instrument rather than simply for a discreet solo; it was played by Mick Karn from Japan, who also contributed bass on the track. Numan was a great fan of Japan's 1980 album Gentlemen Take Polaroids, and this influenced him to adopt this new musical style.

Like much of its parent album, the song was inspired by the betrayal of a former lover. According to Numan, "There was a 'little incident' in February that involved one particular person who thought she could make an awful lot of money out of saying what it was like to be with me for six months. You don't expect that. I was all set for, y'know, the ring – the lot! Then it turns round and hits you like an atom bomb."

The music video, filmed at Southam Zoo literalised the idea of a predatory woman by showing the singer on the run from a panther in scenes that prefigured the remake of Cat People, released the following year. The video featured model and actress Sheila Ming-Burgess.

The single's B-side was an abstract track called "I Sing Rain", whose vocal largely consisted of the word "rain" repeated over and over as well as various wordless cries. An additional B-side released on the 12" single, "Exhibition", utilised the ubiquitous Roland CR-78 drum machine preset also found on Numan's recordings of "On Broadway", "Bombers (live)", "Remember I was Vapour", "Telekon", and "Stories".

"She's Got Claws" was the only single release from the Dance album, reaching number 6 in the UK Singles Chart. Prior to its release it was played live on Numan's Teletour, and recorded at his 1981 Wembley concert for the video Micromusic (the soundtrack of which was released later as Living Ornaments '81).

It was covered by Posh on the Numan tribute album Random in 1997. A remixed version appeared on the collection The Mix in 1998.

== Track listing ==
7" version:

1. "She's Got Claws" (Gary Numan) - 4:55
2. "I Sing Rain" (Numan) - 2:30

12" version:

1. "She’s Got Claws" (Numan) - 4:55
2. "I Sing Rain" (Numan) - 2:30
3. "Exhibition" (Numan) - 4:27

== Production credits ==
- Producers:
  - Gary Numan
- Musicians:
  - Gary Numan: Vocals, SCI Prophet-5, Roland Jupiter-4, ARP Odyssey, Roland CR-78, Piano
  - Cedric Sharpley: drums
  - Chris Payne: Viola
  - Mick Karn: Bass guitar, Saxophone
  - John Webb: Handclaps
