= I Die: You Die =

Single by Gary Numan

from the album Telekon (cassette release / reissue)
- B-side: "Down in the Park" (Piano Version) (UK) "Sleep by Windows" (US)
- Released: 22 August 1980
- Recorded: Matrix Studios, London, 1980
- Genre: New wave; synth-pop
- Length: 3:40
- Label: Beggars Banquet; BEG 46
- Songwriter: Gary Numan
- Producer: Gary Numan

Gary Numan singles chronology
"We Are Glass" (1980)	"I Die: You Die" (1980)	"This Wreckage" (1980)

"I Die: You Die" is a song by the English new wave musician Gary Numan, released as a single in August 1980. Released shortly before his fourth studio album, Telekon, it continued the anthemic style Numan had begun earlier in the year with "We Are Glass". The composer himself described the two singles as "Much the same thing. Both very chorus-oriented with the guitars as the main rhythmic device and the keyboards tinkling over the top".

== Background ==
Like "We Are Glass", "I Die: You Die" had been premiered live during the final legs of Numan's 1979-80 concert tour The Touring Principle, before being recorded. It has since featured regularly in Numan's performances and on his live albums. Stephin Merritt from The Magnetic Fields covered the song on the Random tribute album in 1997. It was remixed for the 1998 collection The Mix and appears on numerous compilation albums.

Lyrically the song was aimed at what Numan saw as an increasingly vitriolic music press:

They crawl out
Of their holes for me
And I die you die
Hear them laugh
Watch them turn on me
And I die you die
See my scars
They call me such things
Tear me, tear me, tear me

== Release ==
The single entered the UK Singles Chart at number 8 and peaked at number 6 the following week but was not included on the vinyl release of Numan's Telekon album, released two weeks later. It did, however, appear on overseas releases of the album, replacing the song "Sleep by Windows", as well as the cassette release. Dutch pressings of the vinyl single were issued in a variety of different colours.

An alternative mix was used for the music video and a limited edition, white-labelled single release. This mix is the version used on all subsequent reissues of Telekon as a bonus track.

The UK single B-side was a solo piano version of one of Numan's most popular songs, "Down in the Park" which is played by Denis Haines. In the US, Australia and other countries where "I Die: You Die" supplanted "Sleep by Windows" on Telekon, the latter track was used as the B-side of the single.

== Track listing ==
1. "I Die: You Die" (Gary Numan) - 3:40
2. "Down in the Park (Piano Version)" (Numan) - 4:16

== Production credits ==
- Producers:
  - Gary Numan
- Musicians:
  - Gary Numan: Vocals, Minimoog, Polymoog, Roland Jupiter-4, Roland CR-78, Guitar
  - Paul Gardiner: Bass guitar
  - Cedric Sharpley: Drums
  - Russell Bell: Backing vocals
  - Denis Haines: Piano, Minimoog, Polymoog, Yamaha CP-30, Backing vocals

== Chart performance ==
Chart (1980)	Peak position
UK Singles Chart	6
Irish Singles Chart	16
American Singles Chart	102

== Bibliography ==
- Paul Goodwin (2004). Electric Pioneer: An Armchair Guide to Gary Numan, Helter Skelter Publishing, ISBN 978-1900924955
