= We Are Glass =

Single by Gary Numan

from the album Telekon (cassette release / reissue)
- B-side: "Trois Gymnopedies (First Movement)"
- Released: 16 May 1980
- Recorded: Rock City Studios, Shepperton, 1980
- Genre: New wave; synth-pop
- Length: 4:46
- Label: Beggars Banquet; BEG 35
- Producer: Gary Numan

Gary Numan singles chronology
"Complex" (1979)	"We Are Glass" (1980)	"I Die: You Die" (1980)

"We Are Glass" is a song by the English new wave musician Gary Numan. It was released as a single in May 1980 and reached number five on the UK singles chart.

The song was Numan's first release since his 1979 album, The Pleasure Principle, which had been notable in part for its complete absence of guitars. Though the album was a major commercial success, Numan decided that "getting rid of guitars had been a mistake" and brought them back into the studio for his next project. The recording also featured viola, piano, and a newly expanded array of electronic keyboards, including ARP Pro Soloist and Roland Jupiter-4, to augment the Moog synthesizers of previous releases.

Originally released on single only, "We Are Glass" reached number 5 on the UK charts in May 1980. The B-side was one of Numan's few non-original pieces, the first movement of Erik Satie's "Trois Gymnopedies," in an arrangement that added guitar, bass and synthesizer to the original's solo piano part.

"We Are Glass" has appeared on numerous compilation albums, as well as CD reissues of the 1980 album Telekon. The song is a regular feature of Numan's concerts and is included on many of his live albums. EMF covered the song on the Random tribute album in 1997. It was remixed twice for the 1998 collection The Mix.

== Track listing ==
1. "We Are Glass" (Gary Numan) – 4:46
2. "Trois Gymnopedies (First Movement)" (Erik Satie) – 2:45

== Production credits ==
Producers

- Gary Numan

Musicians

- Gary Numan: Vocals, Minimoog, Polymoog, ARP Pro Soloist, Roland Jupiter-4, Guitar
- Paul Gardiner: Bass guitar
- Cedric Sharpley: Drums
- Chris Payne: Viola, Piano
- Rrussell Bell: Guitar, ARP Pro Soloist
- Dennis Haines: ARP Pro Soloist, Piano, Yamaha CP-30
- John Webb: Percussion
