= Peel Sessions (disambiguation) =

Peel Sessions are live music sessions recorded for John Peel's BBC Radio 1 show.

Peel Sessions may also refer to:

== A–F ==
- Peel Session (Autechre EP)
- Peel Session 2, by Autechre
- The Peel Sessions (Babes in Toyland album)
- The Peel Sessions (Band of Susans album)
- The Peel Session (Syd Barrett album)
- Peel Session TX 21/07/1998, by Boards of Canada
- The Peel Session (Bolt Thrower EP)
- The Peel Sessions 1988–90, by Bolt Thrower
- The Peel Session (Bongwater EP)
- The Peel Sessions (Bonzo Dog Band album)
- The Peel Sessions Album (Billy Bragg album)
- The Peel Session (Bratmobile EP)
- Peel Sessions (Tim Buckley album)
- Peel Session TX 09/03/00, by Mira Calix
- The Peel Sessions (Can album)
- The Peel Sessions, by Carcass
- The Peel Session, by Clouddead
- The Peel Sessions (The Cure EP)
- John Peel Session (Deep Turtle EP)
- The Complete BBC Peel Sessions, by the Delgados
- The Peel Sessions (Echo & the Bunnymen EP)
- The Fall: The Complete Peel Sessions 1978–2004
- Peel Sessions, by Family
- The Peel Sessions (Fluke album)

== G–N ==
- Peel Sessions (Galaxie 500 album)
- The Peel Sessions (Gang of Four album)
- The Peel Sessions, by Peter Hammill
- The Peel Sessions 1989 and The Peel Sessions 1991, by the Happy Mondays
- The Peel Sessions 1991–2004, by PJ Harvey
- Peel Sessions (Hot Snakes EP)
- BBC Radio 1 John Peel Sessions (I Am Kloot album)
- The Peel Sessions (The Jesus and Mary Chain EP)
- The Complete John Peel Sessions (The Jesus and Mary Chain album)
- The Peel Sessions (Joy Division), two EPs and a compilation album
- The Peel Sessions 1979–1981, by Killing Joke
- The Peel Sessions, by the Locust
- The Peel Sessions (Madness)
- The Peel Sessions Album (Microdisney album)
- John Peel Sessions (The Moondogs album)
- The Peel Session (Múm EP)
- The Peel Sessions (Napalm Death album)
- Peel Sessions, by Nebula
- The Peel Sessions (New Order album)
- The Complete John Peel Sessions (Gary Numan album)

== O–Z ==
- The Peel Sessions Album, by the Only Ones
- Peel Session (Orbital EP)
- Peel Sessions 1979–1983, by Orchestral Manoeuvres in the Dark
- The Peel Sessions (Prong EP)
- The Peel Sessions (Pulp album)
- The Peel Sessions (The Ruts album)
- The Peel Sessions (Siouxsie and the Banshees)
- The Peel Sessions, by the Slits
- Peel Sessions (The Smashing Pumpkins EP)
- The Peel Sessions (The Smiths EP)
- The Peel Sessions, by June Tabor
- The Peel Sessions (That Petrol Emotion EP)
- The Peel Sessions (Thin Lizzy album)
- Peel Sessions (The Triffids album)
- The Peel Sessions (Trumans Water album)
- The Peel Sessions Album, by the Undertones
- The Complete Peel Sessions 1986–2004, by the Wedding Present
- Ukrainian John Peel Sessions, by the Wedding Present
- The Peel Sessions Album (Wire album)

== Various ==
- Too Pure – The Peel Sessions, by Th'Faith Healers, Stereolab, and PJ Harvey

== See also ==
- Category:Peel Sessions recordings
- List of Peel sessions
- List of Peel Sessions issued by Strange Fruit Records
