= The Complete John Peel Sessions =

The Complete John Peel Sessions may refer to:

- The Complete John Peel Sessions (The Jesus and Mary Chain album), 2000
- The Complete John Peel Sessions (Gary Numan album), 2007
- The Fall: The Complete Peel Sessions 1978–2004

== See also ==
- Peel Sessions (disambiguation)
