= Hybrid (Gary Numan album) =

Remix album by Gary Numan
- Released: 10 February 2003
- Recorded: 2002
- Length: 46:06 / 49:39
- Label: Jagged Halo; JHCD 005
- Producer: Sulpher, Andy Gray, Rico, Curve, Flood, Alan Moulder, Gary Numan, Mark Thwaite

Gary Numan chronology
Pure (2000)	Hybrid (2003)	Jagged (2006)

Professional ratings
Review scores
Source	Rating
AllMusic	3/5 stars
Release Magazine	8/10 stars

Hybrid is a remix/cover album, consisting of songs by Gary Numan remixed by other artists, covers of Numan's early songs from his first three albums, plus three new tracks created specifically for the album. Hybrid was recorded in autumn of 2002 and released in March 2003 with a collaboration from various industrial rock/heavy rock musicians such as Rico, Sulpher and Alan Moulder. The album includes tracks originally found on the albums Tubeway Army, Replicas, The Pleasure Principle, Telekon, Sacrifice, Exile and Pure.

The album was released in two different editions, a standard two-CD version and a special edition that included an extra DVD containing additional remixes as well as a video section.

The album reached number 99 on the album chart. "Crazier", a collaboration with Rico, was released as a single and reached number 13 on the UK Singles Chart, Numan's first top 20 hit since "Cars (Premier mix)" in 1996 and his first non-remix top 20 hit since "Change Your Mind" in 1985.

== Track listing ==
All songs written by Gary Numan unless otherwise noted.

=== Disc 1 ===
1. "Hybrid" (Numan/Sulpher) – new track – 5:10
2. "Dark" – reworked by Andy Gray – 4:54
3. "Crazier" (Rico/Numan) – new track – 3:55
4. "Bleed" – reworked by Sulpher – 5:33
5. "Torn" – reworked by Sulpher – 5:11
6. "Down in the Park" – reworked by Curve – 5:31
7. "Everyday I Die" – reworked by Andy Gray – 4:33
8. "Absolution" – reworked by Andy Gray – 6:43
9. "Cars" – reworked by Flood – 4:34

=== Disc 2 ===
1. "Ancients" (Numan/Andy Gray) – new track – 5:10
2. "Dominion Day" – reworked by Sulpher – 4:50
3. "A Prayer for the Unborn" – remix by Andy Gray – 3:49
4. "Me! I Disconnect from You" – mixed by Alan Moulder – 4:41
5. "Listen to My Voice" – remix by Rico – 5:10
6. "Rip" – rework by Andy Gray – 5:58
7. "This Wreckage" – reworked by Mark Thwaite, mixed by Numan and Thwaite – 4:51
8. "Are 'Friends' Electric?" – reworked by Andy Gray – 5:41
9. "M.E." – reworked by Gary Numan – 4:41
10. "Down in the Park" – reworked by Sulpher – 4:25

=== Mutate DVD ===
==== Audio section ====
1. "Crazier" (Rico/Numan) – remix by Steve Osborne – 3:22
2. "All I Know" (Numan/Gray) – alternate version of "Ancients" – 4:25
3. "Rip" – original version – 5:09
4. "Are 'Friends' Electric" – Metalmorphosis mix: – reworked by Mark Thwaite, mixed by Numan and Thwaite 5:17
5. "Dominion Day" – single version – 3:40
6. "Crazier" – live Arte TV – 3:55
7. "A Prayer for the Unborn" – live Arte TV – 5:28
8. "Ancients" (Numan/Gray) – Grayed Out mix – 7:08

==== Video section ====
1. "Crazier" – Steve Osborne mix
2. "Rip"
3. "Cars" (Fear Factory Mix)
4. "Dominion Day"
5. "Crazier" – live Arte TV
6. "A Prayer for the Unborn" – live Arte TV

== Personnel ==
- Gary Numan – guitar
- Roderick Chandler – drums
- Francesca Hanley – flute
- Rob Holiday – guitar, vocals
- Sandy Mill – vocals
- Alan Moulder – guitar
- Richard Pryce – double bass
- Mark Ralph – guitar
- Zakaroo – inspiration

Producers

- Curve, DJ Rico, Flood, Andy Gray, Monti, Alan Moulder, Gary Numan, Mark Thwaite
- Steve Malins – Executive Producer
