= Pure (Gary Numan album) =

Studio album by Gary Numan
- Released: 9 October 2000
- Recorded: 2000
- Studio: Alien, London
- Genre: Industrial rock; industrial metal; gothic rock
- Length: 55:15
- Label: Eagle
- Producer: Gary Numan, Sulpher

Gary Numan chronology
Exile (1997)	Pure (2000)	Jagged (2006)

Singles from Pure
- 1. "Rip" Released: 13 July 2002

Professional ratings
Aggregate scores
Source	Rating
Metacritic	67/100
Review scores
Source	Rating
AllMusic	3/5 stars
Drowned in Sound	2/10
The Guardian	3/5 stars
NME	2/10
Now	2/5 stars
Q	3/5 stars
Release Magazine	7/10
Select	3/5 stars

Pure is the fourteenth solo studio album by the English musician Gary Numan, released in October 2000 by Eagle Records.

== Music and lyrics ==
Lyrically, Pure was seen as continuing Numan's attacks on Christian dogma, but in a somewhat more personal fashion than on his previous album, Exile (1997). The recording featured an expanded group of collaborators after the largely one-man efforts of Sacrifice (1994) and Exile. The Sulpher team of Rob Holliday and Monti contributed guitar and drums, respectively, as well as keyboards and additional production.

The opening/title song was typical of most tracks on the album, beginning with ethereal strings and piano effects that gave way to an industrial metal guitar riff before breaking into a thunderous chorus. It was described by Numan as an attempt to explore the mind of a rapist and murderer. "Walking With Shadows" started with a scenario similar to the early Tubeway Army song "The Life Machine", that of a man in a coma, but one who, rather than wishing to return to his loved ones, wanted his loved ones to join him. "My Jesus", "Listen to My Voice" and "Rip" expanded upon the atheistic/heretical themes that were introduced on Sacrifice and which dominated Exile. "I Can’t Breathe" inhabited a world similar to Sacrifice's "Deadliner", that of a waking nightmare. "Fallen" was the composer's first instrumental in a number of years, full of distorted effects. "A Prayer for the Unborn" and "Little Invitro" were relatively gentler numbers inspired by personal tragedy, specifically the recent miscarriages suffered by Numan's wife Gemma and the couple's many unsuccessful IVF attempts up until that time.

Pure's style was compared to that of other industrial rock acts, such as Nine Inch Nails and Marilyn Manson, who had themselves acknowledged Numan's earlier influence on their own music. Whilst some critics and fans professed themselves weary of a third record apparently obsessed with (anti) religious themes, others such as The Sunday Times described Pure as Numan’s best album since his classic 1979/80 period.

== Promotion and release ==
Numan toured extensively in support of the new album, captured in the Scarred live recording issued in 2003. A number of the tracks were also remixed for the Hybrid collection, released the same year. Unlike the three previous albums, no 'Extended' version of Pure was ever officially made available, though a bootleg of dubious authenticity exists. However, a 2CD numbered limited edition 'Tour Edition' was released in 2001, containing a poster and a bonus CD with screensaver, live tracks and two remixes. The album artwork was also extensively re-worked. The only single, "Rip", was released 18 months after the album; it reached number 29 in the UK charts, making it Numan's first new single to hit the Top 40 since "No More Lies" with Shakatak's Bill Sharpe in 1988. In the United States, "Listen to my Voice" was a radio hit, reaching No.13 on the R&R Alternative Charts.

== Reception ==
Pure received mixed to positive reviews. Writing in NME in October 2000, music journalist Noel Gardner described the album as "Pure ... ends up a mere testament to Numan's bloated vanity; impeccably produced, yet wincingly self-important and wholly charmless". Darryl Sterdan, when reviewing the album for Canoe.ca, described Numan's vocal and lyrical approach as "whispering like Manson and yelping like Reznor about pain, isolation and sacrifice". Sterdan went on to say, "Numan admits these brooding electro-goth pouts were influenced by U.S. electro-metal. He gets one point for honesty, but none for originality or even timeliness -- Rip, Torn and Fallen sound like the cliche dreck Trentoids were churning out en masse in '96. It didn't work then, and it doesn't work now. Especially for a guy like Numan who can do so much better."

The album was more positively assessed in Kerrang: "This veteran artist has released a superbly dark and dysfunctional industrial album that will electrocute you. My Jesus and Rip are just two of many tracks that spiral with synth-based dementia before immersing you in elegant waves of distortion. If you like your melancholia dense and dynamic, you won't want Pure to end. And no way will you believe it's a Gary Numan album. Venturing into darker pastures than Depeche Mode dared, Pure lives out a post-modern nightmare of Blade Runner fashioned alienation. It would be selling Numan short to call Pure pregnant with menace".

Writing in The Guardian, Maddy Costa also described Numan as sounding like Manson and Reznor, but noted that "nobody quite emulates him". Liana Jonas, reviewing the album for Allmusic, said, "Pure is good, dark mood music, seasoned with menacing basslines, electronic crashes and spikes, and slow-grinding guitars. It's an effective pairing -- ghostly voice coupled with industrialized music; often this genre features scream-singing." Writing for PopMatters, Wilson Neate said, "Pure is Gary Numan's richest, most powerful and most aggressive work in years."

Pure made a limited impression on the UK Albums Chart where it reached number 58, staying on the charts for one week.

In 2013, Pure was reappraised by Jamie Halliday of Audio Antihero Records in a "Paint It Back" retrospective article for the GoldFlakePaint music site, praising the album and calling it Numan's "21st century masterpiece."

== Re-recording ==
In July 2021, Ade Fenton, Numan's producer on albums such as Savage (2017) and Intruder (2021), announced in an interview on YouTube that Sacrifice, Exile and Pure would be re-recorded. As of 2025, release details have not yet been confirmed.

== Track listing ==
All songs written by Gary Numan, except where noted.

=== 2000 Eagle Records CD release (EAGCD 078) ===
1. "Pure" – 5:08
2. "Walking With Shadows" – 5:52
3. "Rip" – 5:06
4. "One Perfect Lie" – 4:35
5. "My Jesus" – 5:45
6. "Fallen" – 2:31
7. "Listen to My Voice" – 5:12
8. "A Prayer for the Unborn" – 5:43
9. "Torn" – 5:10
10. "Little Invitro" – 4:28
11. "I Can't Breathe" (Numan, Rob Holliday, Monti) – 5:45

=== 2001 Eagle Records 'Tour Edition' CD (EDGTE 078) ===
Disc one

Same track listing as original release.

Disc two

1. "Pure" (live) – 6:43
2. "My Jesus" (live) – 5:52
3. "Rip" (live) – 5:09
4. "Cars" (live) – 3:22
5. "Replicas" (live) – 5:13
6. "A Prayer for the Unborn" (Greyed Up Remix) – 8:35
7. "Listen to My Voice" (Greyed Up Remix) – 8:01
- The live tracks later appeared on the Scarred live album. "A Prayer for the Unborn" (Greyed Up Remix) later appeared on the Exposure compilation album.

== Personnel ==
- Gary Numan – guitar, keyboards, programming, vocals
- Richard Beasley – drums
- Steve Harris – guitar
- Rob Holliday – guitar, keyboards
- Monti – drums, keyboards, programming
