= Ghost Nation =

Ghost Nation may refer to:

- Ghost Nation (TV series), a paranormal reality-documentary television series
- Ghost Nation (album), a 1989 studio album by Hunters & Collectors featuring a song of the same name
- A fictional group of hosts (AIs) that appear as Native American people on the TV series Westworld
- A song from Gary Numan's 2017 studio album Savage (Songs from a Broken World)
