= BBC in Concert =

BBC in Concert may refer to:

== Programs ==
- In Concert (BBC TV series), a 1970s music television series produced by Stanley Dorfman
- In Concert, a 1970s radio show on BBC Radio 1 produced by Jeff Griffin

== Albums ==
- BBC in Concert (Killing Joke album), 1995
- BBC in Concert 1972–1973, a 1997 album by Badfinger
