= Rob Holliday =

English musician

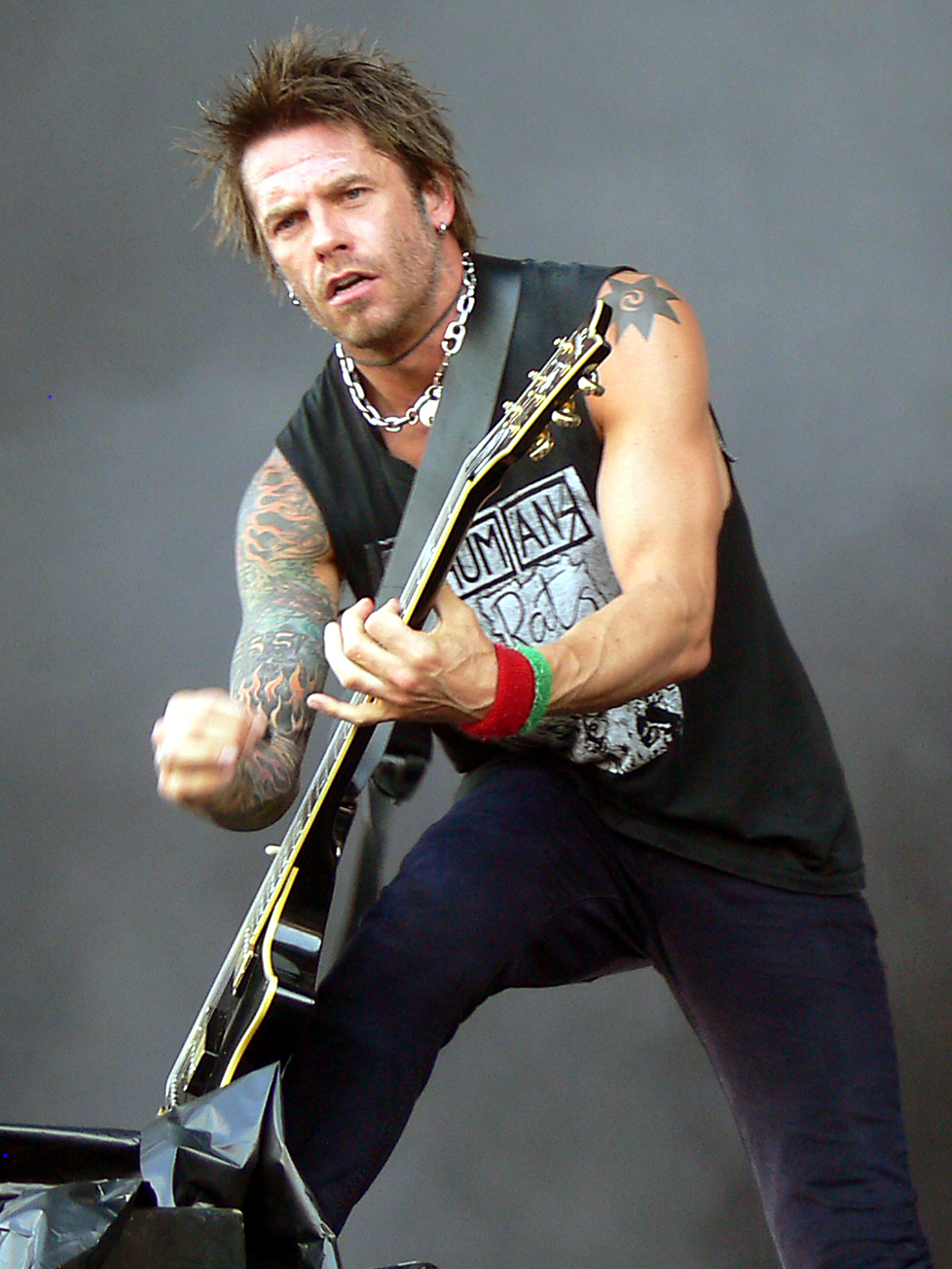
- Holliday performing with the Prodigy in 2009

Background information
- Genres: Industrial metal; alternative metal; electronic; big beat
- Occupation: Musician
- Instruments: Vocals; guitar; bass
- Member of: The Prodigy (touring); Sulpher
- Formerly of: Marilyn Manson (touring); The Creatures (touring); The Mission; Flint; Gary Numan (touring); Curve (touring); Low Art Thrill

Rob Holliday is an English musician best known as the live guitarist for the Prodigy and as a former touring member of Marilyn Manson. Holliday has also worked and toured with the Creatures and Gary Numan, been a member of the Mission and Flint, and is one of the founders and the frontman of the industrial rock band Sulpher.

== Career ==
Rob Holliday is half of the band Sulpher, having duties as a lyricist, guitarist, and lead vocalist. The duo have released two albums: Spray, with the singles "One of Us" and "You Ruined Everything", and No One Will Ever Know, which was released in 2018. Sulpher also includes Monti (Curve, Cocteau Twins, Gang of Four, the Jesus and Mary Chain) as producer, programmer, and drummer and Tim Mud as live guitarist. Holliday is currently the live guitarist for Gary Numan and live guitarist and live bassist for the Prodigy, and has also played live guitars and bass for Marilyn Manson during the Rape of the World tour. Holliday did not contribute to the writing or recording of the band's album Eat Me, Drink Me, released in 2007.

Holliday has been a touring member of the Prodigy since 2005.

== Discography ==
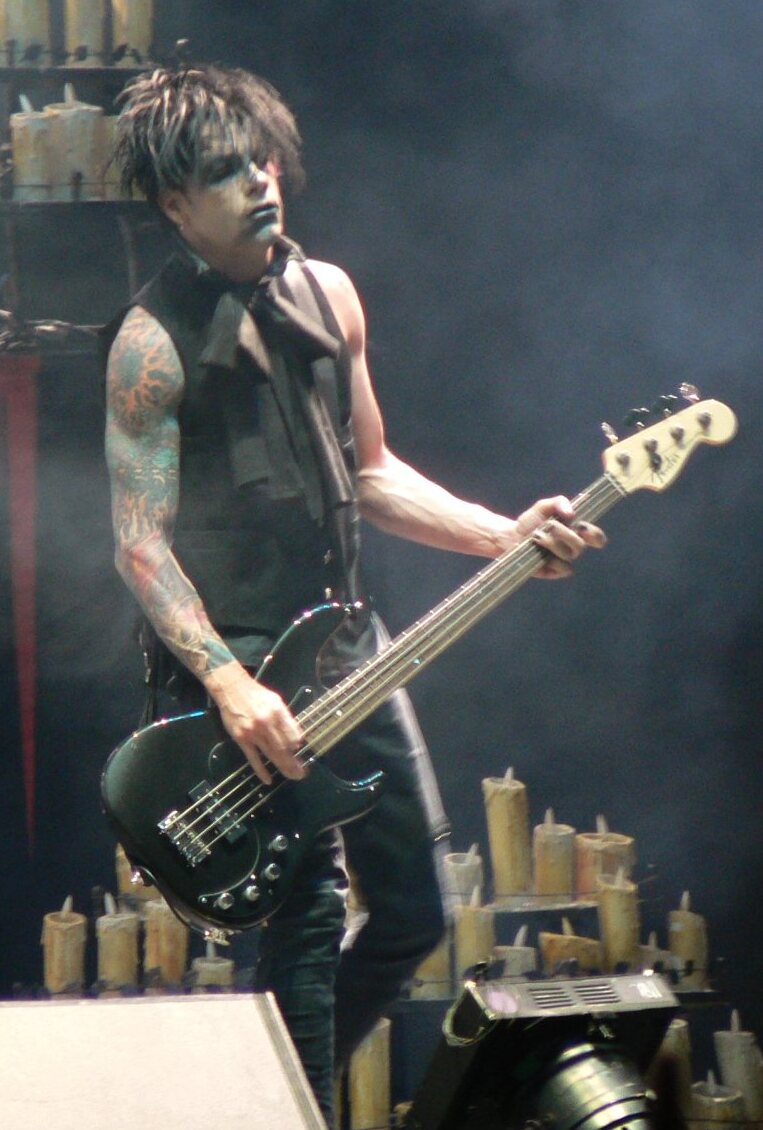
Holliday with Marilyn Manson in 2007

=== Gary Numan ===
- Pure (2000)
- Scarred (2003)
- Hybrid (2003)
- Live at Shepherd's Bush Empire (2004)
- Jagged (2006)

=== Curve ===
- Gift (2001)

=== Sulpher ===
- Spray (2002)
- No One Will Ever Know (2018)

=== The Mission ===
- Lighting the Candles (Live CD and DVD) (2005)

=== The Prodigy ===
- World's on Fire (Live CD and DVD) (2011)
- The Day Is My Enemy (2015)

== Credits ==
- Low Art Thrill – guitar (1996–1997)
- Curve – live guitar (1998)
- The Creatures – live guitar, live bass (1999–2000)
- Sulpher – writing, guitar, vocals (1999–present)
- Gary Numan – producer, remixer, live guitar, live bass (2000–2006)
- The Mission – live guitar (2001–2004)
- Flint – live bass (2003)
- The Prodigy – live guitar, live bass (2005–present)
- Marilyn Manson – live bass (2007), live guitar (2008)
