= Dean Chalkley =

British photographer

- Born: 2 April 1968 (age 58); Essex, England
- Occupations: Photographer; filmmaker; DJ
- Website: deanchalkley.com

Dean Chalkley (born 2 April 1968 in Essex) is a British photographer and filmmaker recognised for documenting youth subcultures, music, and fashion. He began publishing in magazines such as Dazed & Confused in the mid‑1990s and became a long‑running contributor to NME from the early 2000s, including covers of artists like Oasis, Daft Punk, and Amy Winehouse.

Chalkley has worked with clients ranging from The Observer Magazine and Sunday Times Magazine to major brands such as Levi’s, Ray‑Ban, Adidas, and Sony Music. In 2006, he was named Portrait Photographer of the Year at the Picture Editors’ Awards, and in 2011 received NME’s Outstanding Contribution to Music Photography award.

He also co‑curated the multimedia exhibition Return of the Rudeboy at Somerset House in 2014, profiling over 60 individuals exemplifying the modern Rudeboy subculture in a visually immersive portrait series.

== Early life ==
Dean Chalkley was born in Essex, England. His early childhood was spent on a farm where his parents worked as labourers, before his family moved to Southend-on-Sea when he was seven years old. He later attended Fairfax High School for Boys in Westcliff-on-Sea.

In interviews, Chalkley has described his teenage years as deeply immersed in the Mod subculture: “a hardened mod, totally into scooters, dressing flamboyantly, in cravats and so on.”

He discovered photography during the late 1980s, in the midst of the acid house movement, though his initial interests after leaving school were in music-influenced fashion.

After completing a degree in photography, Chalkley relocated to London and worked as an assistant to photographers Malcolm Venville and later Seamus Ryan, with the latter engagement lasting approximately 18 months.

== Career ==
While studying photography, Chalkley began contributing to Dazed & Confused magazine, then based in Brewer Street and edited by Jefferson Hack and Rankin, with art direction by Mark Saunders. His first assignment was to photograph the artist Helen Chadwick. He received a featured spotlight on his photography in issue 13, followed by coverage of bands such as Solar Race in issue 17, and Young British Artists (YBAs) including Darren Almond in 1997, Angus Fairhurst, and a group feature in issue 34 that included Sam Taylor-Wood, Mat Collishaw, Douglas Gordon, Cerith Wyn Evans, and Gillian Wearing.

Chalkley also became a regular contributor to Mixmag, shooting both covers and feature spreads. Assignments included travelling to Iceland with the electronic duo Propellerheads, and extended coverage of club season in Ibiza.

In addition to his editorial work, Chalkley has produced photography and film projects in commercial advertising. Alongside this, he has continued to develop personal projects focused on music, fashion, and youth culture. These include both photographic series and short films.

=== Music ===
Chalkley began photographing for NME in 2001, with Richard Ashcroft of The Verve as his first subject. He was introduced to the magazine by photography director Marian Paterson and established a long-standing working relationship, contributing numerous covers and editorial features. In 2006, he was awarded Portrait Photographer of the Year at the Picture Editors’ Awards.

In 2013, Chalkley produced cover photography for NME featuring Beady Eye, Daft Punk, The Vaccines, the NME Awards 2013, and Foals.

In addition to his editorial work for publications such as NME and Uncut, Chalkley has shot album and single artwork as well as press imagery for a wide range of artists. Clients have included major labels such as XL Recordings, Sony, Island Records, Universal, and Acid Jazz. His credits include:

- Sonique – single I Put a Spell on You (1998)
- Dizzee Rascal – album Boy in da Corner (2003)
- Lily Allen – single LDN (2006)
- The Horrors – single Gloves (2007)
- New Young Pony Club – album Fantastic Playroom (2007)
- Paul Weller – album Wake Up the Nation (2010)
- Tinchy Stryder – album Third Strike (2010)
- Black Kids – album Partie Traumatic (2008)
- Valerie June – album Pushin' Against a Stone (2013)
- Martin Freeman and Eddie Piller – album Jazz on the Corner (2018)
- The Brand New Heavies – album TBNH (2019)
- Carmy Love – single Rebel (2021)
- Phono 48 – single So Pure (2022)
- Skindred – album Smile (2023)
- His Lordship – album His Lordship (2024)
- Richard Hawley – album In This City They Call You Love (2024)

== Moving image ==
=== Arena ===
In 2013, Chalkley directed the short film Arena, which explores the subculture of banger racing in the UK. The 12-minute film focuses on characters and scenes from the Spedeworth Racing Track in Aldershot. It premiered at the Victoria and Albert Museum in London on 27 September 2013, as part of the museum's Friday Lates programme.

=== Young Souls ===
Young Souls began as a photographic and film project commissioned by 125 Magazine, under the theme of "Religion". The project was developed rapidly, with production beginning in late December 2010 and culminating in early 2011.

The film and photo series celebrate the passion and energy of a new generation engaging with the Northern Soul music and dance scene. Chalkley wrote, directed, and produced the film, casting participants through online community forums and Northern Soul networks.

A teaser trailer was released via Chalkley’s official Vimeo on 5 April 2011. The full photographic series was published in 125 Magazine later that year.

The project premiered at Bethnal Green Working Men’s Club in London, followed by an online release via 125 Magazine in July 2011. The images and film were subsequently exhibited at the Youth Club Gallery by PYMCA from 21 July to 16 August 2011, featuring 22 photographs and a screening of the film. Young Souls was later screened at Turner Contemporary in Margate in October 2013.

Critics and peers commented on the film's cinematography and authenticity. Eddie Piller described it as “a homage” to Northern Soul, while music journalist Ian Dewhirst called it “very, very authentic” and “absolutely beautifully filmed.” Writing for It's Nice That, Bryony Quin noted that the film’s visuals and dancing were “so damn cool it hurts.”

=== Kojey Radical ===
Chalkley directed a short film titled Kojey Radical, which premiered in November 2018 at the Doc'n Roll Film Festival at The Photographers' Gallery in London, accompanied by a Q&A session.

The film was subsequently screened during the "Friday Late: Rising" program at the V&A Museum as part of its late-night events series.

=== Good for the Soul ===
Good for the Soul (2023) is a short film directed by Dean Chalkley that celebrates the energy and community of Northern soul dancing. The film premiered as part of the exhibition 50 Years On: The Soul Stays Strong in Wigan, commemorating the 50th anniversary of the Wigan Casino all-nighters, widely regarded as a landmark venue in Northern Soul culture.

Following its debut, the film was screened at independent festivals including Doc'n Roll Film Festival, the Southend Film Festival, and Doc of the Bay in San Sebastián, Spain.

The online premiere took place on 13 January 2025 through Nowness as part of its Just Dance strand. The film is also available via the Ace Records YouTube channel.

=== Strip ===
Strip is a 10-minute short film created by Chalkley in 2000. Shot in both black and white and colour, it was written and produced by Chalkley, with music and sound design by Geir Jenssen and editing by Suky Chiaranussati. The film explores themes of anticipation and temporal shifts, blending imagery from past and present through the lens of a drag racing strip.

=== Serge ===
Serge is a short film written and directed by Chalkley in 2005. The score was composed by Golden Globe-winning musician Jóhann Jóhannsson, and the film was edited by Spencer Doane.

== Publications ==
Back In Ibiza 1998–2003 (ACC Art Books, 2025) is a 160-page photography book documenting Ibiza’s club scene between 1998 and 2003. The images were taken during Chalkley's time shooting for Mixmag and feature venues including Space, Amnesia, Café del Mar, and Privilege.

The book has been noted for capturing the atmosphere of Ibiza's club culture before the rise of social media. The Guardian featured a selection of images from the book, highlighting Chalkley’s extensive archive from that period. According to the publisher's editorial review, the book presents the photos without captions, inviting viewers to engage directly with the images.

Return of the Rudeboy (Dean Chalkley & Harris Elliott, 2015) – A 128-page hardcover book that encapsulates the "Return of the Rudeboy". exhibition held at Somerset House in 2014. The publication features over 60 portraits of individuals embodying the modern "Rudeboy" style, accompanied by essays on Rudeboy heritage and culture.

== Exhibitions ==
Notable exhibitions include:

=== Southend's Underground ===
Southend’s Underground opened in August 2006 at The Spitz gallery. It was a snapshot of the thriving music scene around the now-defunct Junk Club and bands such as The Horrors and These New Puritans.

=== The New Faces ===
On 4 March 2010, Chalkley opened *The New Faces* at The Book Club in Shoreditch, London. The exhibition, inspired by 'Modfather' Paul Weller, consisted of studio portraits of sharply dressed young Mods, their attitude, and dance moves. It ran until 29 April 2010. In 2012, Chalkley released *The New Faces: A Short Film*.

=== Tess Exhibition ===
Originally scheduled from 20 March 2014 to 20 April 2014, this exhibition featured erotic images of a model known only as "Tess" and was extended until 9 May 2014 at Trisha's in Soho.

=== 21 ===
21 was an exhibition held at Quaglino's celebrating the venue's 21st birthday. Chalkley exhibited 21 photographs portraying heroes and heroines from the contemporary music scene, including portraits of Daft Punk, Noel Gallagher, and The White Stripes.

=== Return of the Rudeboy ===
Return of the Rudeboy, created by photographer and filmmaker Dean Chalkley and creative director Harris Elliott, was exhibited at Somerset House from 13 June to 25 August 2014. The multi-room presentation featured over 60 portraits of individuals who exemplify the 21st-century Rudeboy subculture and included immersive installations—such as a pop-up grooming station and curated soundscapes—to evoke the sartorial and cultural atmosphere of the movement.

== Exhibitions overview ==
Date	Exhibition	Venue	Solo/Group
17 June 2005	Physical Culturist	The Rex Cinema & Bar, London	Solo
16 August 2005 – 3 September 2006	Southend's Underground	Spitz Gallery, London	Solo
20 June 2007 – 22 June 2007	Southend's Underground	Doris Club, Florence, Italy	Solo
30 September 2009 – January 2010	A Star Is Born	Folkwang Museum, Essen, Germany	Group
4 March 2010 – 29 April 2010	The New Faces	The Book Club, London	Solo
29 July 2010 – 2 August 2010	The New Faces	Gijón, Spain	Solo
6 January 2011 – 13 January 2011	Look.Hear (5 images)	The Print Space, London	Group
22 July 2011 – 4 August 2011	Young Souls	Youth Club Gallery, London	Solo
19 January 2012 – 29 March 2012	Young Souls	Hotel Pelirocco, Brighton	Solo
4 February 2012 – 20 February 2012	Look.Hear	White Wall Space, Leigh-on-Sea	Solo
26 May 2012 – 3 June 2012	50 Years of British Rock	Liangdian Design Center, Beijing, China	Group
20 September 2012 – 26 October 2012	Look.Hear / Young Souls	Royal Albert Hall, London	Solo
23 March 2013 – 11 August 2013	David Bowie Is	V&A, London	Group
28 June 2013 – 6 October 2013	You Ain't Seen Nothing Yet	FoMu, Antwerp, Belgium	Group
20 March 2014 – 9 May 2014	Tess Exhibition	Trisha's, London	Solo
28 March 2014 – 5 July 2014	21	Quaglino's, London	Solo
13 June 2014 – 25 August 2014	Return of the Rudeboy	Somerset House, London	With Harris Elliott
7 September 2017 – 5 November 2017	Reverberation	The Book Club, London	With DISCORDO
21 September 2023 – 21 October 2023	50 Years On The Soul Stays Strong	Wigan, United Kingdom	Group
24 May 2025 – 26 October 2025	After the Future in the Scene by the Sea	Beecroft Gallery, Southend-on-Sea	Group
17 May 2025 – 30 August 2025	Back in Ibiza	Century Club, London	Solo
7 June 2025 – 10 August 2025	Back in Ibiza	The Social, London	Solo

== Awards ==
- Portrait Photographer of the Year – Picture Editors’ Awards (2006)
- NME/Nikon Outstanding Contribution to Music Photography (2011)
