= On Returning (1977–1979) =

Compilation album by Wire
- Released: 1989
- Recorded: 1977–1979
- Genre: Post-punk; art punk; punk rock
- Length: 74:31 (CD)
- Label: Restless
- Producer: Mike Thorne

Wire compilation album chronology
| ''On Returning (1977–1979)'' (1989) | The Peel Sessions Album (1989) |

Professional ratings
Review scores
| Source | Rating |
|---|---|
| AllMusic | 4.5/5 stars |
| Robert Christgau | A |
| NME | 8/10 |

On Returning (1977–1979) is a compilation album by English rock band Wire. It was released in 1989 and comprises recordings of the band from 1977 to 1979 (the albums Pink Flag, Chairs Missing and 154, which are also each represented graphically on the album cover), and is seen as the band's first "best of" album, complemented four years later by 1985–1990: The A List which is the "best of" of the band's second era. The album is named after the band's track "On Returning" which closes the album, originally released on the band's third album 154 (1979).

== CD track listing ==
| No. | Title | Writer(s) | Length |
|---|---|---|---|
| 1. | "12XU" | Bruce Gilbert, Robert Gotobed, Graham Lewis, Colin Newman | 1:56 |
| 2. | "It's So Obvious" | Gilbert, Gotobed, Lewis, Newman | 0:52 |
| 3. | "Mr. Suit" | Gilbert, Gotobed, Lewis, Newman | 1:25 |
| 4. | "Three Girl Rhumba" | Gilbert, Gotobed, Lewis, Newman | 1:24 |
| 5. | "Ex Lion Tamer" | Gilbert, Gotobed, Lewis, Newman | 2:18 |
| 6. | "Lowdown" | Gilbert, Gotobed, Lewis, Newman | 2:27 |
| 7. | "Straight Line" | Gilbert, Gotobed, Lewis, Newman | 0:46 |
| 8. | "106 Beats That" | Gilbert, Gotobed, Lewis, Newman | 1:13 |
| 9. | "Strange" | Gilbert, Gotobed, Lewis, Newman | 3:58 |
| 10. | "Reuters" | Gilbert, Gotobed, Lewis, Newman | 3:02 |
| 11. | "Field Day for the Sundays" | Gilbert, Gotobed, Lewis, Newman | 0:29 |
| 12. | "Champs" | Gilbert, Gotobed, Lewis, Newman | 1:47 |
| 13. | "Feeling Called Love" | Gilbert, Gotobed, Lewis, Newman | 1:22 |
| 14. | "I Am the Fly" | Lewis, Newman | 3:07 |
| 15. | "Dot Dash" | Lewis, Newman | 2:24 |
| 16. | "Practise Makes Perfect" | Gilbert, Newman | 4:06 |
| 17. | "French Film Blurred" | Lewis, Newman | 2:35 |
| 18. | "Another the Letter" | Gilbert, Newman | 1:08 |
| 19. | "I Feel Mysterious Today" | Lewis, Newman | 1:56 |
| 20. | "Men 2nd" | Lewis | 1:42 |
| 21. | "Marooned" | Gilbert, Lewis, Newman | 2:20 |
| 22. | "Sand in My Joints" | Lewis | 1:51 |
| 23. | "Outdoor Miner" | Lewis, Newman | 2:51 |
| 24. | "A Question of Degree" | Lewis, Newman | 3:11 |
| 25. | "I Should Have Known Better" | Lewis | 3:50 |
| 26. | "Two People in a Room" | Gilbert, Newman | 2:09 |
| 27. | "Blessed State" | Gilbert | 3:28 |
| 28. | "The Other Window" | Gilbert, Lewis | 2:09 |
| 29. | "40 Versions" | Gilbert | 3:28 |
| 30. | "A Touching Display" | Lewis | 6:55 |
| 31. | "On Returning" | Newman | 2:06 |

== LP track listing ==
| No. | Title | Writer(s) | Length |
|---|---|---|---|
| 1. | "12XU" | Bruce Gilbert, Robert Gotobed, Graham Lewis, Colin Newman | 1:56 |
| 2. | "It's So Obvious" | Gilbert, Gotobed, Lewis, Newman | 0:52 |
| 3. | "Mr. Suit" | Gilbert, Gotobed, Lewis, Newman | 1:25 |
| 4. | "Three Girl Rhumba" | Gilbert, Gotobed, Lewis, Newman | 1:24 |
| 5. | "Ex Lion Tamer" | Gilbert, Gotobed, Lewis, Newman | 2:18 |
| 6. | "Lowdown" | Gilbert, Gotobed, Lewis, Newman | 2:27 |
| 7. | "Strange" | Gilbert, Gotobed, Lewis, Newman | 3:58 |
| 8. | "Reuters" | Gilbert, Gotobed, Lewis, Newman | 3:02 |
| 9. | "Feeling Called Love" | Gilbert, Gotobed, Lewis, Newman | 1:22 |
| 10. | "I Am the Fly" | Lewis, Newman | 3:07 |
| 11. | "Practise Makes Perfect" | Gilbert, Newman | 4:06 |
| 12. | "French Film Blurred" | Lewis, Newman | 2:35 |
| 13. | "I Feel Mysterious Today" | Lewis, Newman | 1:56 |
| 14. | "Marooned" | Gilbert, Lewis, Newman | 2:20 |
| 15. | "Sand in My Joints" | Lewis | 1:51 |
| 16. | "Outdoor Miner" | Lewis, Newman | 2:51 |
| 17. | "A Question of Degree" | Lewis, Newman | 3:11 |
| 18. | "I Should Have Known Better" | Lewis | 3:50 |
| 19. | "The Other Window" | Gilbert, Lewis | 2:09 |
| 20. | "40 Versions" | Gilbert | 3:28 |
| 21. | "A Touching Display" | Lewis | 6:55 |
| 22. | "On Returning" | Newman | 2:06 |

== Personnel ==
Wire

- Bruce Gilbert – guitar
- Robert Gotobed – drums
- Graham Lewis – bass guitar, vocals
- Colin Newman – guitar, vocals

Production

- Bruce Gilbert – design
- Jon Savage – compilation producer, liner notes
- Mike Thorne – producer
