= Exile (Gary Numan album) =

Studio album by Gary Numan
- Released: 20 October 1997
- Recorded: 1996–1997
- Studio: Outland, London
- Genre: Industrial rock; gothic rock
- Length: 47:14; 73:26 (Extended)
- Label: Eagle, earMUSIC
- Producer: Gary Numan

Gary Numan chronology
Random (1997)	Exile (1997)	Pure (2000)

Singles from Exile
- 1. "Absolution (original)" Released: 13 March 1995; 2. "Dominion Day" Released: 6 April 1998

Professional ratings
Review scores
Source	Rating
AllMusic	3/5 stars

Exile is the thirteenth solo studio album by the English musician Gary Numan, released in October 1997 by Eagle Records. Its release continued a critical upswing in Numan's career which began three years earlier with the release of Sacrifice, and which had been boosted by the release of the Random tribute album earlier in 1997.

== Overview ==
The album followed a loose concept namely that, rather than being opposites, God and the Devil were two sides of the same coin. Each track reflected some aspect of this premise. Unlike Sacrifice, Numan's theme in Exile was not so much atheistic as heretical; it did not deny the existence of God but, instead, his proclaimed goodness. Shortly after the album's release, Numan explained: "Personally, I don't believe in God at all, but if I'm wrong and there is a God, what kind of god would it be who would give us the world we live in?"

The opening number and single, "Dominion Day", set the album's gothic/industrial rock tone, describing how a man's nightmare becomes reality as Christ returns to Earth in scenes suggestive of the Book of Revelation. The tale was set against a wall of synthesizers, drum loops and distorted guitars. "Dark", which further explored what the composer saw as an incestuous relationship between God and the Devil, became a favourite for movie trailers before being used on the soundtrack of Alex Proyas’ film Dark City. "Dead Heaven" turned various biblical conceits on their head (Mary is ravaged, rather than revered, by the Three Wise Men) while "Absolution", a re-recording of a 1995 single, was a bitter reflection on the consequences of unquestioning faith; it had been covered by Amanda Ghost on the Random tribute album.

Though not a big chart success Exile scored almost universally positive reviews, a contrast to the situation in Numan's early years when he had many hits but was generally condemned by critics. However it further alienated some fans who had been put off by Sacrifice's anti-religious undertones. The website www.remindmetosmile.com changed from a tribute page to one openly critical of Numan for being "so bold that he feels he can mock God and feel good about it". Numan's response was:

"This sort of reaction always amazes me. Here you have people that genuinely believe that God created this entire bloody universe in just six days, without anybody's help, and yet they seem to think that He needs their help to deal with little me. If God was bothered about me, He would deal with me".

The US edition of Exile included one extra track, a live recording of "Down in the Park", previously released on the double album Ghost (1987); Numan, who did not approve its inclusion, presumed that his record label did it to link him to Marilyn Manson and other artists who had recently covered the song. An extended version of Exile, twenty six minutes longer than the original, was released in 1998. Numan toured the UK and US in support of the album to largely sell-out crowds, a concert recording from this period called Live at Shepherd’s Bush Empire (US title Live in London) eventually being released in 2004.

== Re-recording ==
On 21 July 2021, Vaughn George announced on his YouTube channel after his interviews with Gary Numan and his present album producer Ade Fenton that Sacrifice, Exile and Pure would be re-produced from the ground up to the current production standards of more current albums produced by Fenton such as Savage and Intruder.

At the time of the video, Sacrifice and Pure had been fully recorded, while production of Exile had been put on hold due to the release of Intruder. There has been no announcement for the release date.

== Track listings ==
All tracks are written by Gary Numan.

Exile (1997 Eagle Records)
No.	Title	Length
1.	"Dominion Day"	4:52
2.	"Prophecy"	5:05
3.	"Dead Heaven"	5:23
4.	"Dark"	4:30
5.	"Innocence Bleeding"	4:26
6.	"The Angel Wars"	5:04
7.	"Absolution"	5:00
8.	"An Alien Cure"	6:09
9.	"Exile"	6:47
Total length:		47:16

Exile (1998 Cleopatra Records US Bonus Track)
No.	Title	Length
10.	"Down in the Park" (Live)	5:10
Total length:		52:24

Exile Extended (1998 Eagle Records)
No.	Title	Length
1.	"Dominion Day"	7:50
2.	"Prophecy"	9:01
3.	"Dead Heaven"	7:52
4.	"Dark"	7:34
5.	"Innocence Bleeding"	6:55
6.	"The Angel Wars"	9:40
7.	"Absolution"	6:28
8.	"An Alien Cure"	9:50
9.	"Exile"	8:57
Total length:		74:07

== Personnel ==
- Gary Numan – vocals, producer, keyboards, guitar, engineer, mixing
- Mike Smith – keyboards
- Rob Harris – guitar

Technical

- Simon Shazell – mastering
- John Burns – re-mastering
- Gemma Webb – assistant engineer, artwork
- Chris Poel – artwork
- Cürt Evans – design
- NuFederation – design
- Joseph Cultice – photography
- Perou – photography
