= Deep Turtle =

Finnish band

- Origin: Pori, Finland
- Genres: Hardcore punk, progressive rock, art punk, post-hardcore, math rock, experimental rock, punk jazz
- Years active: 1990-1996, 2002-2004
- Members: Pentti Dassum; Tapio Laxström; Mikko Saaristo

Deep Turtle was a Finnish band, active 1990–1996 and 2002–2003.

== Overview ==
Formed in 1990, Deep Turtle was a product of the burgeoning underground music culture of the city of Pori, Finland. Deep Turtle's music fused the energy of hardcore punk, the harmonies of jazz, Latin rhythms, and the experimentalism of progressive rock into a style, which was sometimes dubbed jazzcore by listeners and reviewers. Signature elements of the band's music were an abundance of uncommon time signatures; frantic and abrupt mood changes between soft jazz tones and blistering punk assault; nimble bass guitar work providing a counterpoint to the guitar attack; and often indecipherable lyrics delivered both in Spanish and in English. Some comparisons have been made to bands like Cardiacs (Turtle's 1994 album in fact has a song titled Cardiako) and NoMeansNo.

The band released its debut EP, Snakefish, in 1992.

Deep Turtle broke up in 1996 but reformed again in 2002, only to disband again in 2004 due to drummer Erjossaari's insurmountable difficulties with tinnitus, which forced him to quit the band.

Deep Turtle made Finnish music history by being the first Finnish band to be invited to do a John Peel session in 1994. Contrary to public belief, Peel was not present at the studio, and he never managed to meet the band in person.

== Lineup ==
Throughout their career, the trio had a constant lineup:

- Pentti Dassum - guitar, vocals
- Tapio Laxström - bass
- Mikko Saaristo (formerly Erjossaari) - drums

== Discography ==
=== Studio albums ===
- There's A Vomitsprinkler In My Liverriver (1994)

=== Compilations ===
- Rip-Off Dokumento (1995)

=== Singles and EPs ===
- Deep Turtle (1991)
- Snakefish (1992)
- Satanus Uranus Tetanus (1993)
- Ghoti (split with Uhrilampaat, 1993)
- Riva! (1993)
- John Peel Session (1994)
- Tungo/Born to Search Cheese (1995)
- Flutina (1996)
- Tutina! (Tungo and Flutina reissued on one disc, 2002)
- VT/DT (split with Valse Triste, 2003)
- Turkele! (2003)
