= Splinter (Songs from a Broken Mind) =

Studio album by Gary Numan
- Released: 14 October 2013
- Recorded: Wealden, East Sussex; Long Eaton, Derbyshire; Los Angeles, California
- Genres: Industrial rock; gothic rock; dark wave
- Length: 52:06
- Labels: Mortal; Cooking Vinyl
- Producer: Ade Fenton

Gary Numan chronology
Dead Son Rising (2011)	Splinter (Songs from a Broken Mind) (2013)	Savage (Songs from a Broken World) (2017)

Professional ratings
Aggregate scores
Source	Rating
Metacritic	79/100
Review scores
Source	Rating
AllMusic	4/5 stars
Consequence of Sound	4/5 stars
The Guardian	3/5 stars
Mojo	4/5 stars
MusicOMH	3.5/5 stars
NME	6/10
Q	4/5 stars
Record Collector	5/5 stars
Rolling Stone	3.5/5 stars
Uncut	7/10

Splinter (Songs from a Broken Mind) is the seventeenth solo studio album by the English musician Gary Numan, released on 14 October 2013 by Mortal Records and Cooking Vinyl. The album debuted at number twenty on the UK Albums Chart on sales of 6,187 copies, becoming Numan's highest-charting album since 1983's Warriors.

== Track listing ==
All tracks are written by Gary Numan.

No.	Title	Length
1.	"I Am Dust"	4:08
2.	"Here in the Black"	4:56
3.	"Everything Comes Down to This"	4:39
4.	"The Calling"	4:33
5.	"Splinter"	5:26
6.	"Lost"	4:42
7.	"Love Hurt Bleed"	4:52
8.	"A Shadow Falls on Me"	3:07
9.	"Where I Can Never Be"	3:46
10.	"We're the Unforgiven"	5:22
11.	"Who Are You"	3:45
12.	"My Last Day"	5:30

Japanese edition bonus track
No.	Title	Length
13.	"The Dark in Me"	4:52

Deluxe edition bonus disc
No.	Title	Length
1.	"I Am Dust" (Original Demo)	4:20
2.	"Here in the Black" (Original Demo)	6:16
3.	"The Calling" (Original Demo)	4:26
4.	"We're the Unforgiven" (Original Demo)	5:29
5.	"I Am Dust" (Roman Remains Remix)	4:21
6.	"Love Hurt Bleed" (Tweaker Remix)	5:04

== Personnel ==
Credits adapted from the liner notes.

- Gary Numan – vocals, keyboards
- Nathan Boddy – mixing
- Matt Colton – mastering
- Ade Fenton – keyboards, mixing, production, programming
- Robin Finck – guitar (1, 6, 9, 10)
- Doc – keyboards (1, 6, 9, 10)
- Steve Malins – art direction
- Steve Harris – guitar (1, 7, 8, 10)
- LaRoache Brothers – photography
- Tim Muddiman – guitar (2, 3, 7, 8, 11, 12); bass (2, 3, 7, 8)

== Charts ==
Chart (2013)	Peak position
Japanese Albums Chart	197
Scottish Albums Chart	24
UK Albums Chart	20
UK Indie Albums Chart	4

== Release history ==
Region	Date	Label
Japan	9 October 2013	Cooking Vinyl, Beat Records
Germany	11 October 2013	Cooking Vinyl
United Kingdom	14 October 2013	Mortal Records, Cooking Vinyl
United States	15 October 2013	Machine Music USA, Inc.
Australia	25 October 2013	Cooking Vinyl
