= Savage (Songs from a Broken World) =

Studio album by Gary Numan
- Released: 15 September 2017
- Recorded: 17 November 2015 – 12 May 2017
- Genres: Industrial rock; electronic rock; gothic rock; dark wave
- Length: 55:51
- Labels: BMG; The End
- Producer: Ade Fenton

Gary Numan chronology
Splinter (Songs from a Broken Mind) (2013)	Savage (Songs from a Broken World) (2017)	Intruder (2021)

Savage (Songs from a Broken World) is the eighteenth solo studio album by the English musician Gary Numan, released on 15 September 2017 by BMG and The End. The album was first announced to be a part of a fan-backed Pledge Music Campaign on 12 November 2015. On 9 November 2018, a follow-up EP titled The Fallen was released. The EP features similar artwork to Savage, and it was intended to complement the album.

The album reached No. 2 in the UK Top 40 album charts, becoming Numan's sixth Top 10 album, and the first since 1982. It proved to be his highest charting album outside of the number-one albums Replicas, The Pleasure Principle and Telekon from 1979 and 1980 and surpassed 1981's Dance, which reached No. 3. It became his first album since Telekon to chart in multiple countries.

== Album concept ==
Savage (Songs from a Broken World) is a concept album centered around the blending of Western and Eastern cultures in a post-apocalyptic world that has become desertified as a result of global warming. "The songs are about the things that people do in such a harsh and terrifying environment," Numan stated in an interview. "It's about a desperate need to survive and they do awful things in order to do so, and some are haunted by what they've done. That desire to be forgiven, along with some discovered remnants of an old religious book, ultimately encourages religion to resurface, and it really goes downhill from there."

== Recording, working titles, and song notes ==
In order of appearance, working demo song titles included:

- "Song 1" (became the 3:17 instrumental introduction to "Broken", after initially being retitled for the album as "If You Had Seen")
- "Dome" (became "Mercy")
- "Kontakt 7" (became "Bed of Thorns")
- "Nameless" (became "Pray for the Pain You Serve", after initially being retitled for the album as "I Belong Here")
- "March" (became "My Name Is Ruin")
- "I Heard a Voice" (became "The End of Things")
- "Save Me" (became "What God Intended")
- "Where Will You Be (When the World Comes Apart)" (was retitled to "When the World Comes Apart" for the album)

"When the world comes apart" is a line from the 1994 Sacrifice song "Magic", and "Mercy" (appearing on the album proper) was an early demo title during the 2006 Jagged sessions, which would eventually become "We Are the Lost" from Dead Son Rising.

A 'pre-Ade Fenton' mp3 of "Bed of Thorns" was made available to download on 3 September 2016. This demo version also appears on the soundtrack to the 2017 film Ghost in the Shell. To quote Numan: "I have a new song 'Bed of Thorns' on the recently released Ghost in the Shell album. To be exact it's my early demo version of the song. The version that will come out on my Savage album in a few months is considerably different." "Bed of Thorns" debuted live on 2 October 2016.

On 13 May 2016, Numan added a video and the following text to Facebook regarding the ballad "If I Said", wherein his daughters, Persia and Echo, sing the song in unison:

Please forgive the proud Dad in me but this is a clip of Persia and Echo singing the "If I Said" piano demo. I'd just finished the lyric and they had just that minute come home from school. They didn't really know the tune at all so it's a little wayward in places. They are both dyslexic, so them reading it at all was enough to make me watery-eyed, but having your own children sing one of your new songs is about as special as it gets.

== Album chart eligibility ==
Following the album's release, it was revealed that, in spite of it being predominantly recorded with electronic instruments, it had been excluded from Billboard's dance/electronic music chart, with an executive from Billboard advising BMG that “Sonically, the Numan album just does not fit in" with Billboard's perception of electronic dance music. The Billboard dance/electronic chart's number one position for September 15 was held by Calvin Harris, whose album, Funk Wav Bounces Vol. 1, sold approximately 600 fewer copies than Savage.

== Critical reception ==
Professional ratings
Aggregate scores
Source	Rating
Metacritic	74/100
Review scores
Source	Rating
AllMusic	4/5 stars
The Guardian	3/5 stars
PopMatters	8/10 stars
The Quietus	8/10 stars

Savage (Songs from a Broken World) garnered generally positive reviews. The album received an average score of 74/100 from 11 reviews on Metacritic, indicating "generally favourable reviews". AllMusic's James Christopher Monger said that Numan "can still juggle melodrama and musicality with such effortlessness is impressive, to say the least, but that he can make it so compelling is what sets him apart from his old guard new wave contemporaries." David Simpson of The Guardian had a mixed impression, saying that despite Numan sounding tired and like a faded star, his music still has a beating heart. The Quietus' Josh Gray criticised Savage (Songs from a Broken World)'s cover art and presentation as culturally and aesthetically offensive and in "poor taste," but he praised the album's songs and themes. Chris Ingalls of PopMatters called the album "a compelling cautionary tale of what may happen if we’re too complacent to give a damn about future generations. It’s also a stunningly sharp and diverse collection of songs from a living legend."

Savage entered the UK album chart at number two, on 22 September 2017, Numan's highest charting album in the United Kingdom since Telekon in 1980. It dropped out of the top twenty the following week. A re-entry to the chart in March 2018 gave the album a total chart run of 5 weeks in the Top 100.

== Release formats ==
Per Numan's website.

- Standard CD
- Deluxe hardback book CD featuring the bonus track "If I Said"
- Double LP featuring two bonus tracks "If I Said" and "Cold"
- Exclusive vinyl picture disc (includes signed 12×12 artwork print), limited to only 500 copies and features two bonus tracks "If I Said" and "Cold"
- Cassette featuring the same tracks as the standard CD.

== Track listing ==
All tracks are written by Gary Numan, except "What God Intended" written by Gary Numan/Ade Fenton.

No.	Title	Length
1.	"Ghost Nation"	4:56
2.	"Bed of Thorns"	5:24
3.	"My Name Is Ruin"	6:17
4.	"The End of Things"	5:01
5.	"And It All Began with You"	6:21
6.	"When the World Comes Apart"	5:27
7.	"Mercy"	5:35
8.	"What God Intended"	5:25
9.	"Pray for the Pain You Serve"	5:27
10.	"Broken"	5:58
Total length:		55:51

Deluxe edition bonus track
No.	Title	Length
10.	"If I Said" (placed before "Broken", which becomes track 11)	6:49

Vinyl edition bonus tracks
No.	Title	Length
9.	"If I Said" (placed before "Pray for the Pain You Serve" and "Broken", which become tracks 10 and 11 respectively)	6:49
12.	"Cold"	5:38

The Fallen EP
No.	Title	Length
1.	"It Will End Here"	4:35
2.	"The Promise"	4:26
3.	"If We Had Known"	4:45
4.	"It Will End Here" (Edit)	3:49
Total length:		17:36

== Personnel ==
- Gary Numan – vocals, keyboards
- Ade Fenton – keyboards, programming, mixing, production
- Steve Harris – guitars
- Tim Slade – bass
- Persia Numan – backing vocals
- Nathan Boddy – mixing
- Paul Carr – mixing assistant
- Matt Colton – mastering

== Charts ==
Chart (2017)	Peak position
Australian Albums (ARIA)	76
Belgian Albums (Ultratop Flanders)	59
Belgian Albums (Ultratop Wallonia)	89
German Albums (Offizielle Top 100)	87
Irish Albums (IRMA)	12
New Zealand Heatseekers Albums (RMNZ)	10
Scottish Albums (Official Charts)	3
Swiss Albums (Schweizer Hitparade)	94
UK Albums (Official Charts)	2
UK Indie Albums (OCC)	1
US Billboard 200	154

Chart (2018)	Peak position
United Kingdom (OCC)	60
Belgian Albums (Ultratop Flanders)	170
