= Yaybahar =

Turkish instrument

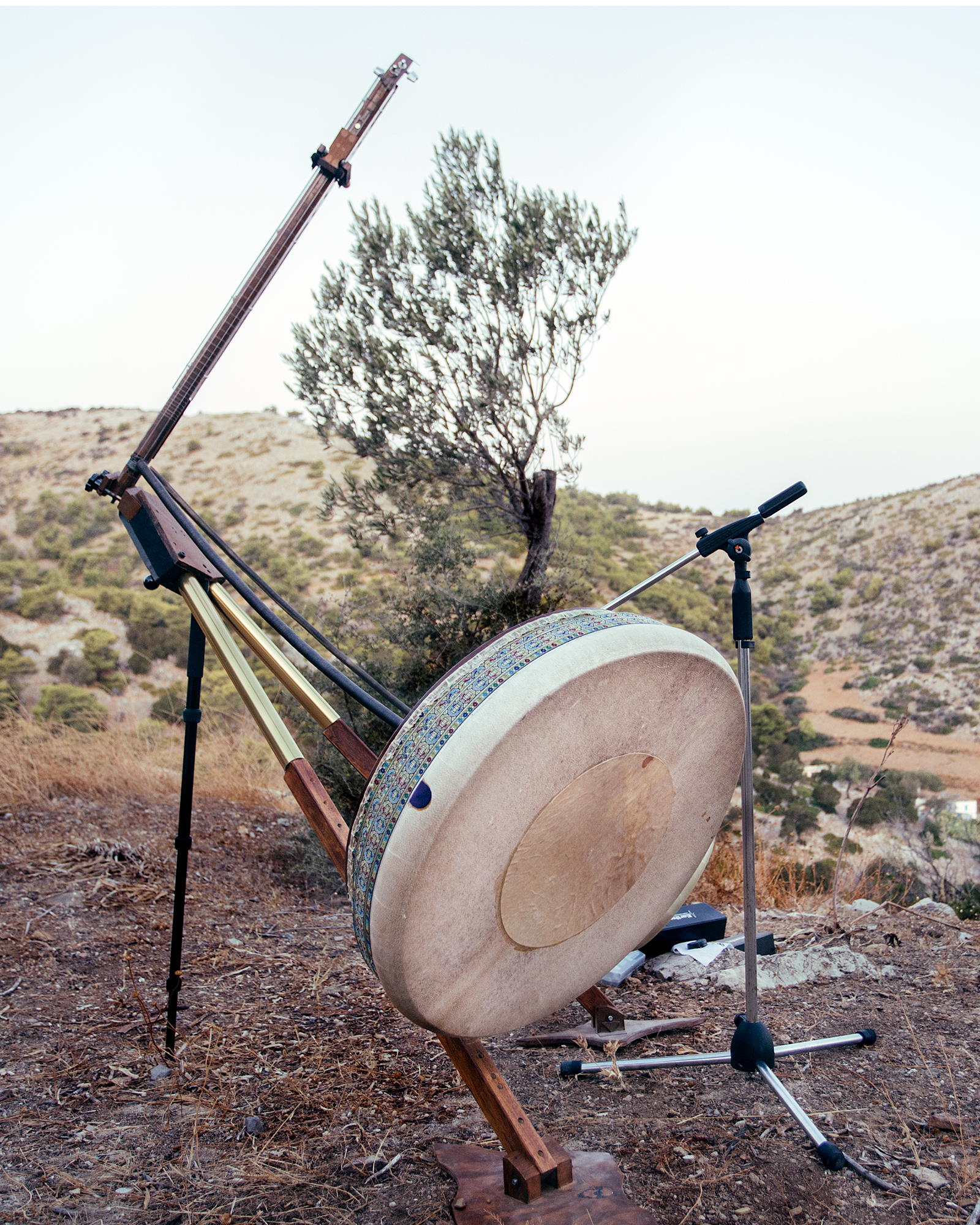
- The original yaybahar instrument made by Gorkem Sen.

acoustic string synthecizer
- Inventor: Gorkem Sen
- Developed: 2008-2015

Sound sample
- Yaybahar sound sample

The Yaybahar is an acoustic musical instrument invented by the Turkish musician Gorkem Sen (Turkish: Görkem Şen), who describes it as a "real-time acoustic string synthesizer."

== Etymology ==
The name yaybahar (pronounced /jajba'har/) has Turkish origin. It is a composite of two words: yay means a "string" or a "coiled string" and bahar means the season "spring." According to Gorkem Sen, the name is derived from the idea of a new life or a new beginning.

== Structure and function ==
The Yaybahar was inspired by several different instruments, including the Turkish ney, African thunder drum and Australian didgeridoo. It represents both Western and Eastern influences in its design and sound. In developing it, Sen invented a new system of bridges between the strings and the resonance body. Composer Ian Honeyman described the Yaybahar as "a cello like instrument that uses springs and drums for resonance rather than a wood body".

The instrument is played similarly to orchestral string instruments by hitting or sliding a wooden bow along the two long springs suspended in the center of two drum heads, by hitting the drums, or by sliding the bow at the top of the instrument, similarly to a standup bass. In its online review, Classic FM described a variety of sounds that the Yaybahar can produce, such as by dragging a mallet across the springs, tapping the ends, and using a bow. The sound produced by the Yaybahar has been compared to sci-fi movie sound effects by multiple publications.

== Manufacturing ==
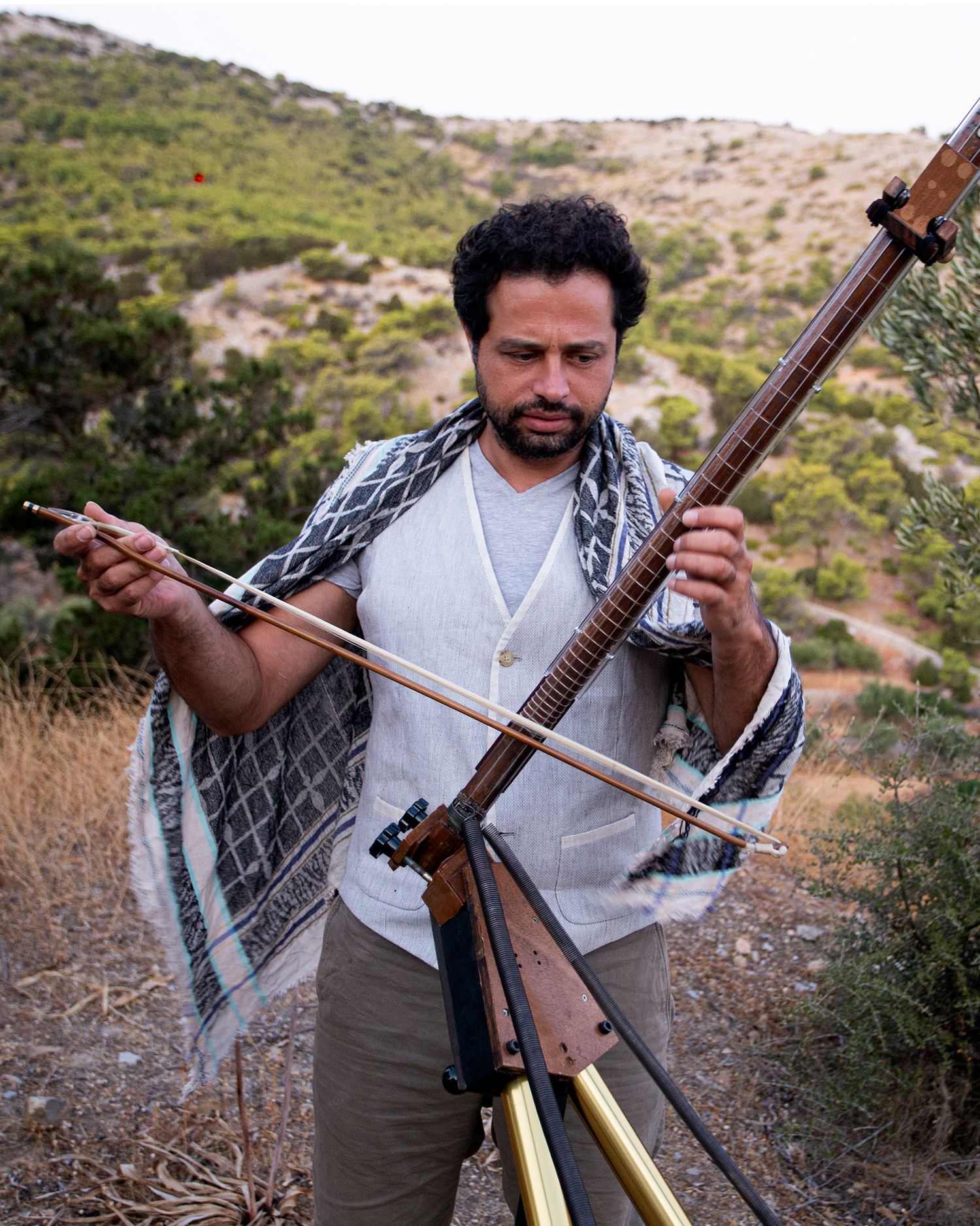
Gorkem Sen playing yaybahar. Hydra island, Greece, 2019.

The Yaybahar isn't manufactured commercially.

- Irish musician Billy Mag Fhloinn built and plays his own Yaybahar. The Irish Times describes Mag Fhloinn's Yaybahar as a "haunting instrument of his own making."
- Film music composer Ian Honeyman uses a self-made Yaybahar for some of his soundtracks.

== Notable uses ==
In 2018 Max Richter composed music featuring the Yaybahar for the film Hostiles by Scott Cooper.

The album "Thar Toinn/Seaborne" (2020) by Irish singer Muireann Nic Amhlaoibh features a Yaybahar played by her husband, musician Billy Mag Fhloinn, on its final track, "Port na bPucaí". Journal of Music described the sound of the Yaybahar in the song as "droning" and "swooping", comparing it to whale song.

The composition "Into Darkness" by Ian Honeyman uses the sound of a Yaybahar.

Gary Numan's 2021 album, Intruder, features contributions from Görkhem Sen playing the Yaybahar.

The score for the 2022-23 palaeo documentary Prehistoric Planet, by the composers Hans Zimmer, Andrew James Christie, Anže Rozman and Kara Talve makes extensive use of the Yaybahar.
