= Perou =

British photographer

perou by frances 2000

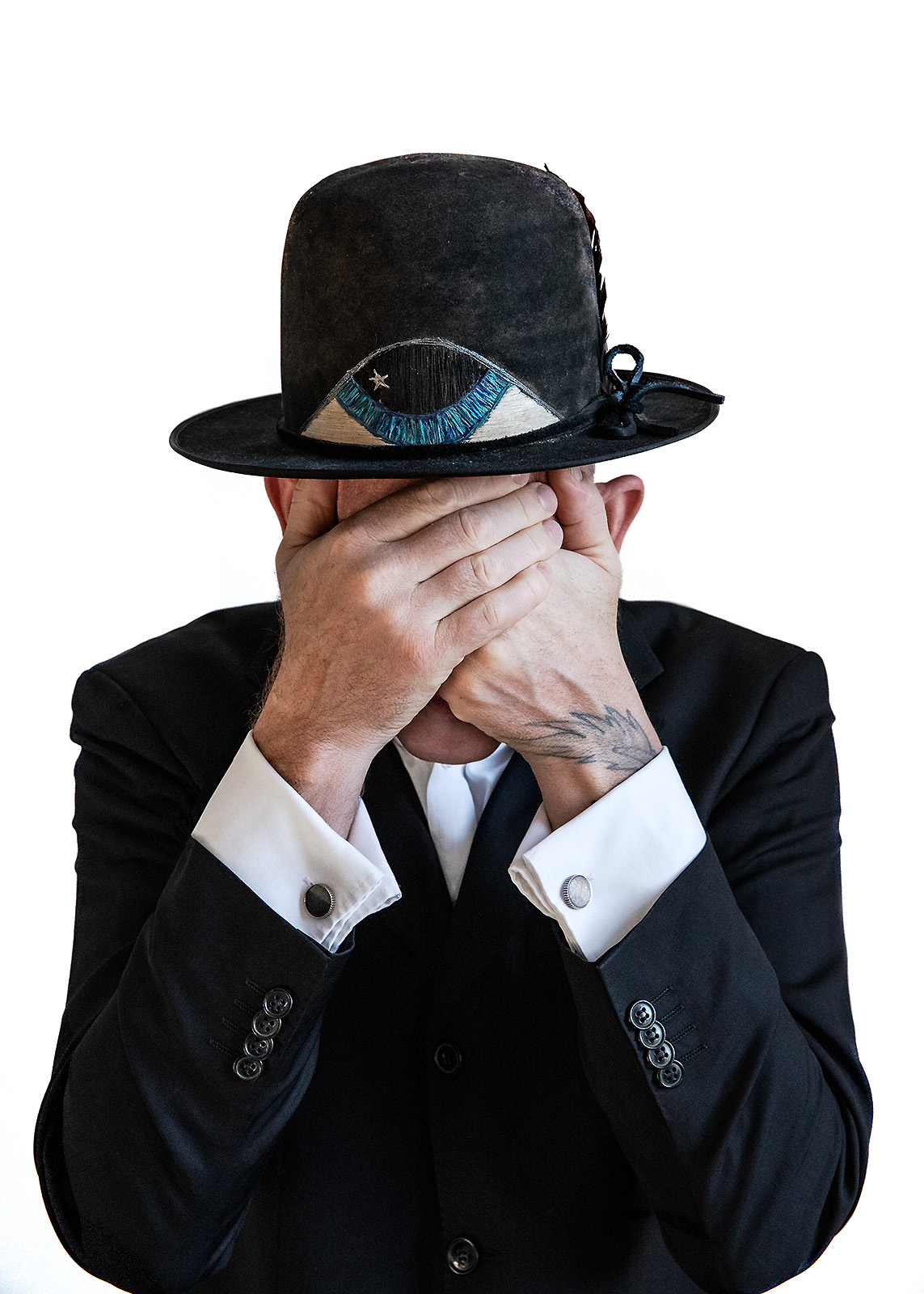
perou 2020

Ralph John Perou (born May 1970), known professionally as Perou, is a British fashion, portrait and music photographer who has also appeared as a judge on Make Me a Supermodel UK and on season 2 of Bravo TV's American Make Me a Supermodel.

== Early life ==
Perou was born in Newick, a small village in East Sussex, England. Perou has stated that he "had a very happy, carefree childhood growing up in the countryside. It's where I discovered my love of English cider". He went to primary school at Newick Church of England school and completed secondary school at Chailey and Haywards Heath Sixth form. When Perou finished his Religious Studies and Design A levels he considered a career as a long-distance lorry driver or as a missionary. But Perou states that he "saw the dark" and after a short stint as a butler he completed a BTEC OND in Design Photography at North East Surrey College of Technology.

Between 1991 and 1994 Perou studied for a BA Hons degree in Photography, Film and Video Arts at the University of Westminster.

== Professional career ==
After graduating in 1994 Perou worked at Click Studios in London as a studio manager.

It was during his time at Click Studios that Perou learned photography professionally. He started shooting for editorial clients like Time Out, Skin Two and Dazed & Confused magazines. He also started shooting bands, following work that he did with his friends who were in the band Elcka.

In 1995, Perou moved to the first floor of a converted fire station in Old Street, London. Shortly after, Dazed & Confused relocated to the ground floor of the same building and Perou started working on the picture desk with the photographic director, Phil Poynter. Perou continued to shoot for magazines and record companies and left Dazed & Confused around 1997. One of his musician shoots was with British singer/songwriter Gary Numan for his 1997 album Exile alongside Joseph Cultice.

Perou was initially known as a 'fetish photographer' through his early work for Skin Two magazine and after being featured in the book Fetish: Masters of Erotic Fantasy Photography.

In 2000, Perou opened the photographic studio, the Perou Factory in Hackney Wick (an industrial estate in the east of London). In 2006 the London Development Agency compulsorily purchased the Perou Factory as part of redevelopments for the 2012 Olympics. Perou and his family relocated to the East Kent coast.

In 2012, Perou with a team of supportive volunteers, started renovating a dilapidated warehouse in Bow, East London. In 2013 it was launched as 'The Bow Bunker', which is a flexible place for photography, film and very special events.

In May 2014 issue one of EDICT magazine was released. Perou is the Editor in Chief of EDICT, the premise of which is: "There's too much of everything. Here's some more." Each issue features one artist recommending one piece of art or other artist; one musician recommending one other band or piece of music etc. EDICT is a free publication that is distributed mainly in the UK and Tokyo, Japan.

Issue 2 of EDICT magazine was released in January 2015; issue 3 was released in September 2016.

On Friday 13th November 2015, Perou's first book Coulrophobia was released, which features self portraits of him made up like a clown. It was made in collaboration with nineteen of the world's best makeup artists and Marilyn Manson. Coulrophobia (which means the fear of clowns) was designed by Peter & Paul and supported by MAC Cosmetics.

In 2020, Perou released '21 Years in Hell: Marilyn Manson by Perou' published by ReelArt Press: a collection of photographs from the 21 years that Perou had been photographing Marilyn Manson and text from a long conversation remembering stories from the times the pictures were taken.

== Exhibitions ==
- 1991 BTEC graduate show in St Martins in the Lane Crypt. London
- 1993 A Private View by Pike and Perou video screening in Milk Bar, Soho
- 1994 PCL graduate show. Riding House Street. London
- 2000 Bosozoku, Tomato. Lexington street, London
- 2000 Bosozoku, Rapid Eye, London
- 2002 Perou Show, at Blink Gallery. London
- 2004 125 Magazine 'Smell Issue' (group show). London
- 2005 Torture Garden, Great Eastern hotel. London.
- 2005 Torture Garden, Galerie Bertin-Toublanc. Paris
- 2006 Bosozoku, Studio Apart. Amsterdam.
- 2006 Dita Von Teese, Parco buildings. Tokyo. Japan
- 2007 BT Essence of the Entrepreneur. Oxo tower Gallery. London
- 2008 BT Essence of the Entrepreneur. Oxo tower Gallery. London
- 2008 Pet Shop Boys in National Portrait Gallery. London
- 2008 Camera Press Anniversary (group show) National Portrait Gallery. London
- 2008 125 Magazine 'Future Issue' (group show) AOP gallery. London
- 2010 The Front Room. Whitstable
- 2010 Perou x mr.Miller& co. 125 Magazine live art event. The Russian Club,. London
- 2015 Coulrophobia, MAC Cosmetics pro store Carnaby Street. London
- 2015 Coulrophobia, MAC Cosmetics Paris
- 2015 Coulrophobia, MAC Cosmetics pro store Berlin
- 2015 Coulrophobia, MAC Cosmetics pro store New York. NY
- 2019 Big Cats, London Bridge Station. London
- 2020 Marilyn Manson by Perou: 21 Years in Hell, La Termica. Malaga. Spain
- 2022 Perou's low-fi Laser Show. Haywards Heath Arts Festival
- 2023 Storytellers group show by Kent Creative at The Beaney, Canterbury UK

== Modelling ==
- 1995 Catwalk Comme des Garçons. Paris
- 1996 Catwalk Sonja Nuttall. London
- 1999 Cyclefly album cover Generation Sap
- 2000 Catwalk Evisu. London
- 2005 Vivenne Westwood Tie campaign s/s 2005.

== TV ==
- 2003 Season 5 Absolutely Fabulous (cameo) in episode 'Exploiting' with Jean-Paul Gaultier
- 2004 BBC Picture of Africa.
- 2005 Channel 5 Make Me A Super Model UK Season 1 judge.
- 2006 Channel 5 Make Me A Super Model UK Season 2 judge and mentor.
- 2008 Celebrity Weakest Link 'Body Beautiful' episode.
  - (Perou would have been first out had he not intimidated Gok Wan into changing his vote).
- 2008 Bravo TV (America) Make Me A Super Model Season 2 judge.
- 2011 Channel 4 Dirty Sexy Things

== Directing ==
- 1999 Marilyn Manson rockumentary God is in the TV.
- 2001 Co-director with Chris Turner for Black Box Recorder
- 2004 Co-director with Bill Yukich for Eighties Matchbox B-Line Disaster Mister Mental
- 2007 KT Tunstall

== Published books ==
- 2015 Coulrophobia
- 2020 Marilyn Manson by Perou: 21 Years in Hell
- 2022 Tunnel Vision

== Album photography ==
- 1997 Exile by Gary Numan
- 2016 Can't Touch Us Now by Madness
