= Jagged =

Studio album by Gary Numan
- Released: 13 March 2006
- Recorded: London, 2005-06
- Genre: Industrial rock, dark wave
- Length: 62:04
- Label: Cooking Vinyl (UK); Metropolis (US)
- Producer: Gary Numan, Ade Fenton

Gary Numan chronology
Pure (2000)	Jagged (2006)	Dead Son Rising (2011)

Singles from Jagged
- 1. "In a Dark Place" Released: 29 July 2006

Professional ratings
Review scores
Source	Rating
AllMusic	2.5/5 stars
MusicOMH	4/5 stars

Jagged is the fifteenth solo studio album by English musician Gary Numan, his first original album in over five years, following Pure in 2000. Stylistically Jagged was a development of its predecessor's chorus-driven, anthemic industrial sound, utilising heavier electronics and more prominent live drumming. Although reaction to the new record was predominantly positive, critical opinion was more heavily divided than had been the case with the almost universal praise enjoyed by Pure. Reaching number 59 in the UK album charts, Jagged charted no higher than the earlier release, some commentators and fans regarding the long time between albums as a missed opportunity for consolidation in the wake of Pure's reception and the number 13 UK chart position attained by Numan's 2003 single with Rico, "Crazier". Jagged was the first album issued on Numan's own Mortal Records label, licensed to Cooking Vinyl. The US release, on Metropolis Records, included an alternate mix of "Fold" as a bonus track. In April, Numan embarked on a tour of the UK, Europe and North America to promote the album.

== Production ==
Originally planned for a 2003 release, Jagged was finally issued in March 2006 after various delays that had resulted in adverse comments from a number of fans, to which Numan responded in kind on his website, NuWorld. He cited the birth of his two children after years of unsuccessful IVF attempts, issues with his former record company Artful, and trepidation at the prospect of producing a successful follow-up to the critically praised Pure as reasons for the delay. Given the album's long gestation period, by the time it was released a number of the tracks had already been published in one form or another. "Haunted" began life as an instrumental on the 2002 compilation Exposure. "Halo" had been premiered in concert in 2003 as "Does God Bleed?", before being given a live DVD release in 2005, as had the title track.

Numan used more musicians on Jagged than on any of his releases for the past decade. The Sulpher team of Rob Holliday and Monti contributed to a number of tracks but, in the end, Numan took the finishing production touches out of their hands and completed the album with techno musician and DJ Ade Fenton. Guest performers included former Nine Inch Nails drummer Jerome Dillon, as well as Martin McCarrick from Therapy?, Siouxsie and the Banshees and other bands, and his wife Kimberlee. Long-time Numan collaborators Steve Harris, Richard Beasley and Andy Gray also played on the album.

The album sold far less than Pure and Exile, his last two albums released through Eagle Records. However Numan claimed this was down to the increasing number of illegal downloads, and stated Jagged on one site had 20,000 downloads of the album alone. The preceding US tour also saw lower numbers due to bad promotion of the album in the states.

== Style ==
The opening song, "Pressure", featured Middle Eastern sounds coupled with lyrics that obliquely alluded to the impatience of fans for new product. Numan's vocal delivery on "Halo" recalled the dance-orientated style of his late-1980s work. "Haunted" utilised a guitar riff reminiscent of Led Zeppelin's "Kashmir". "In a Dark Place", released as a single and video in July 2006, was one of a number of tracks which continued the (literal) questioning of God common to Numan's three previous albums, Sacrifice (1994), Exile (1997) and Pure. Another track debunking religious beliefs was "Melt", with the lines "I know that Heaven is a burnt out shell / I know forgiveness is the door to Hell / I know confession is a black empty lie".

A number of reviewers noted ephemeral links between Jagged and Numan's classic work from the late 1970s and early 1980s, though the composer himself claimed not to see such connections. The final/title track, as well as featuring harshly whispered vocals in the style of Numan's 2002 hit "Rip", included in its coda an echo of the distinctive siren-like 'vox humana' Polymoog sound that characterised "Cars" and other songs on The Pleasure Principle (1979), and also appeared on the Andy Gray remix Pure's "A Prayer for the Unborn".

== Track listing ==
All songs written by Gary Numan.

1. "Pressure" – 5:19
2. "Fold" – 5:47
3. "Halo" – 4:17
4. "Slave" – 6:02
5. "In a Dark Place" – 6:06
6. "Haunted" – 5:31
7. "Blind" – 7:01
8. "Before You Hate It" – 5:14
9. "Melt" – 5:18
10. "Scanner" – 6:02
11. "Jagged" – 5:27

== Remix album: Jagged Edge (2008) ==
In 2008, Numan released Jagged Edge, a remix album featuring reworked and alternative versions of songs from Jagged. The two-disc set was released through Numan's official website and in limited physical quantities. It includes both new remixes and previously unreleased alternate takes of album tracks.

=== Track listing ===
Disc 1

1. "Edge" – 4:07¹
2. "Fold" – 6:51¹
3. "Halo" – 4:32²
4. "In a Dark Place (Single Remix)" – 3:59¹
5. "Blind" – 4:47³
6. "Before You Hate It" – 5:36¹
7. "Haunted" – 5:09¹
8. "Slave" – 5:45¹
9. "Melt" – 4:04¹

Disc 2

1. "Fold" – 4:35³
2. "Jagged" – 7:37¹
3. "Before You Hate It" – 5:49¹
4. "Pressure" – 6:18¹
5. "In a Dark Place" – 6:08¹
6. "Melt" – 5:42⁴
7. "Slave" – 6:39¹
8. "Scanner" – 5:16¹

=== Production credits ===
- ¹ Produced by Ade Fenton & Gary Numan
- ² Produced by Sulpher & Gary Numan
- ³ Produced by Rob Holliday, Gordon Young & Gary Numan
- ⁴ Produced by Monti & Gary Numan

== Personnel ==
=== Performance ===
- Gary Numan – vocals, guitars, keyboards
- Richard Beasley – drums
- Jerome Dillon – drums
- Ade Fenton – keyboards, drum and sound programming
- Andy Gray – keyboards, programming
- Steve Harris – guitars
- Rob Holliday – guitars, bass
- Kimberlee McCarrick – violin
- Martin McCarrick – cello
- Monti – drums, keyboards, programming
- Gordon Young – keyboards, programming, instrumentation

=== Production ===
- Steve Gullick – photography
- Gary Numan – production, engineering, mixing engineering
- Ade Fenton – production
- James O'Connell – engineering
- Nick Watson – mastering
