= 1985–1990: The A List =

Compilation album by Wire
- Released: 18 May 1993
- Recorded: 1985–1990
- Genre: Alternative rock; alternative dance; post-punk
- Length: 74:30
- Label: Mute
- Producer: Gareth Jones; Daniel Miller; Rico Conning; David M. Allen

Wire compilation album chronology
The Peel Sessions Album (1989)	1985–1990: The A List (1993)	Behind the Curtain (1995)

Professional ratings
Review scores
Source	Rating
AllMusic	4/5 stars
Robert Christgau	A
Entertainment Weekly	B

1985–1990: The A List is a compilation album by Wire. It was released on 18 May 1993 by Mute Records. It comprises recordings by the band from 1985 to 1990 and is seen as the band's second "best of", complementing 1989's On Returning (1977–1979), the "best of" album for the first era of the band.

As the back cover states, the track listing was decided by asking various compilers to name their "Top 21" Wire tracks from the 1985–1990 era in order of preference, which were then arranged on a "football league" basis. The final chosen tracks and running order are based on this chart and the maximum running time of a compact disc, with no edits to songs.

== Critical reception ==
AllMusic's Steve Huey felt that the compilation could have been sequenced better since "the selections were simply arranged according to which ones received the largest number of votes, meaning that the compilation loses a little steam since many of the best songs appear toward the beginning." Huey called it "a handy overview of the band's uneven comeback albums" and "the best way to hear catchy slices of post-punk avant-pop like "Ahead," "Kidney Bingos," "Eardrum Buzz," and "In Vivo." He concluded that "for all but the most devoted, The A List is probably all that's necessary from this period."

== Track listing ==
All tracks are written by Wire

No.	Title	Original release	Length
1.	"Ahead"	The Ideal Copy, 1987	5:00
2.	"Kidney Bingos"	A Bell Is a Cup, 1988	4:09
3.	"A Serious of Snakes"	Snakedrill EP, 1986	4:44
4.	"Eardrum Buzz" (single version)	Single; bonus track on It's Beginning to and Back Again, 1989	4:14
5.	"Drill"	Snakedrill EP	5:03
6.	"Ambitious"	The Ideal Copy	4:11
7.	"In Vivo" (remixed single version)	Single; bonus track on It's Beginning to and Back Again	3:25
8.	"The Finest Drops"	A Bell Is a Cup	4:56
9.	"Madman's Honey"	The Ideal Copy	4:29
10.	"Over Theirs"	The Ideal Copy	5:27
11.	"Silk Skin Paws"	A Bell Is a Cup	4:51
12.	"The Queen of Ur and the King of Um"	A Bell Is a Cup	4:01
13.	"Torch It!"	Manscape, 1990	7:25
14.	"Advantage in Height"	Snakedrill EP	3:04
15.	"Point of Collapse"	The Ideal Copy	3:24
16.	"Feed Me"	The Ideal Copy	5:58

== Personnel ==
Credits adapted from the album's liner notes.

Wire

- Colin Newman
- Graham Lewis
- Bruce Gilbert
- Robert Gotobed

Production

- Gareth Jones – production, engineering, mixing [1–3, 5, 6, 8–12, 14–16]
- Daniel Miller – production, mixing [3, 5, 14], remixing [7]
- Rico Conning – production, engineering, mixing [4, 7]
- David M. Allen – production, mixing [13]
- David Heilmann – engineering [2, 8, 11, 12]
- Roy Spong – engineering [13]
- André Giere – assistant engineering [1, 6, 9, 10, 15, 16]
- Giles Martin – remixing [7]
- Colin Newman – remixing [7], editing, compilation
- Paul Kendall – editing, compilation
- Roland Brown – editing, compilation
- Jon Wozencroft – design
