= Dirty Sexy Things =

2011 British documentary TV series

- Dirty Sexy Things title card
- Genre: Reality television
- Starring: Ariella; BB; Charlotte de Carle; Jay Camilleri; Jessye B Jesse Burgess; Ocean Moon; Rob
- Country of origin: United Kingdom
- Original language: English
- No. of series: 1
- No. of episodes: 8

Production
- Running time: 60 mins

Original release
- Network: E4
- Release: 4 July – 22 August 2011

Dirty Sexy Things is a British concept documentary series that aired on E4 about eight models preparing for eight shoots which culminated in an exhibition for fashion photographer Perou. A promo for the show began airing on E4 at the end of June 2011. The show is sponsored by Rimmel London. The title music and incidental music for the show was composed by Matt Thomas of Mosquito Music.

The series featured eight episodes, the first of which aired 10pm Monday 4 July 2011 on E4 and again on Saturday 9 July on Channel 4.

The series also aired on the Canadian television channel Fashion Television under the name "A Model Life", for unknown reasons.

== Cast ==
- Perou – famous photographer of Make Me a Supermodel UK fame who wants eight models to appear in his exhibition.
- Clara – Perou's assistant.
- Hamilton – Perou's stylist who clashes with Ocean and considers her a 'Diva'
- Bunny – Hamilton's assistant.

Anastacia – Lord Rob's glamour model girlfriend.

=== Models ===
- Ariella – Described as a blonde bombshell, known to wind the other models up due to her pretentious attitude. Clashes with Perou over her principles regarding nudity (Mainly in the Iceland shoot), she exits the series early with Perou stating that he did not want to work with her due to her attitude, but returns for the final shoot.
- B.B. Kaye – A dancer-turned-model, who more recently has worked with the likes of Alexandra Burke, he struggles to balance his dancing career with his aspirations of progressing his modelling career. A bisexual, he confesses to having slept with two celebrities, he also develops a romance with Charlotte. Perou learns that BB is a stage name for 'Black Beauty'.
- Charlotte De Carle – A down-to-earth model, whose previous experience focused upon modelling her sister's lingerie. She develops a romance with B.B., but sometimes struggles with his bisexuality.
- Jay Camilleri – A bisexual party boy – chosen for his 'London' and 'Urban' look. Jay is often seen as an irritant by his fellow models, having argued with Jesse, Jessye B and BB throughout the series. Despite his hostile temper, the series explores Jay as an insecure character, with confidence issues surrounding his body.
- Jessye "B" Romeo – The daughter of a model and soul star Jazzie B (thus earning her nickname "Jessye B") she's seen as professional, having researched the majority of her employers beforehand and playing up to potential employers to get the job. She has a close friendship with B.B. and Charlotte, often seen gossiping with them. In the early stages of the series, both Jay and Ariella claim not to like her.
- Jesse Burgess – Chosen for his preppy-looks, the youngest of the models dreams of bigger things. He wants to use his modelling career to take him into a music career with his band 'lux', he also has aspirations of presenting, having nearly clinched a job with T4.
- Ocean Moon – Graduated from a fashion school and has a 'kooky' look Perou was looking for, having worked a lot within high fashion, Ocean attempts to branch out into editorial work, which appears to be successful for her. In the early stages of the series, she clashes with Perou's stylist, Hamilton, who sees her as a diva.
- Rob Walters – Often known as Lord Rob, his family dates back to King Henry VIII. He is a fitness model, looking to get more mainstream work, like Ocean, however his muscled physique often holds him back, making him less versatile than the other male models. The series also focuses on his relationship with girlfriend, Anastasia, who concentrates on her glamour modelling career, whilst supporting Rob.

== Series One ==
Perou's first photo L-R Rob, Jessye B, Jesse, Ariella, BB, Charlotte, Jay and Ocean.

Perou holds an open casting for eight models to take part in an exhibition of eight pictures. He selects BB, Jay, Rob, Jesse, Charlotte, Ariella, Ocean and Jessye B. The first week sees the group doing a lingerie shoot around central London, with a picture of all eight models selected. Following this the models take part in a Heroes and Villains shoot. Perou feels Ariella is struggling with this task but she is not given the chance to improve as BB has to leave for a dance job. In the end a single shot of Ocean is chosen. The third task sees the models taking some acting classes as they are asked to move around whilst having paint thrown at them. BB and Charlotte, who have recently become close, are chosen for the final picture. The next assignment has Jay, Charlotte, Jessye B and Jesse return to Perou's hometown of Whistable for an Ocean shoot. Jay gets drunk the night before and upsets the other models and so decides to return home instead of taking part. Charlotte has trouble as the shoot involves being covered in fish; which she hates, however it is her photo that is selected. Areilla has problems with Perou's next assignment in Iceland as it requires her to wear nothing but her underwear and a faux fur coat. Although she goes ahead with it Perou is unimpressed with the results and decides he does not want to work with her anymore. He is impressed with Charlotte but decides to select BB's picture. Following this he has Jay, Ocean and Jesse take part in his woodland shoot. He admits that he enjoys working with Jay who does well but ultimately he chooses Ocean's picture for the exhibition. The next shoot involves Rob, Jay, Charlotte, BB and Jesse posing in a deep water tank. In order to prepare for this they pose for a life during class which helps Jay overcome some of his body issues. BB, Jesse and Rob find it difficult to pose for pictures because they are uncomfortable underwater. Perou is impressed, again, with Jay but decides to select Charlotte's picture as she captures what he was looking for perfectly. For the final shot Perou sends the group to a country manor and selects a picture of all the models together in order to draw comparisons with the first shoot they did and the journey they have been on. He then unveils his exhibition and the models discover which shots were selected. BB, Charlotte and Ocean are pleased to see they all have solo shots but Jay and Jesse are particularly disappointed to see they have not. Perou reflects on his time with each of the models.

BB struggles between putting his modelling career over his dancing. He also becomes close to Charlotte and the two go on a date. Jay struggles to get signed because of his height and also decides he needs to curb his drinking habits whilst working. Ariella clashes with Perou over her principles with nudity. Jesse expresses wishes to get into TV presenting and performs his first gig with his band. Rob wants to branch out into high fashion despite his fitness background and Ocean wants to try her hand at the more commercial side of modelling.

=== Episodes ===
No.	Weekly Assignment	Original release date
1	4 July 2011	
The first episode introduces Perou and the casting in which he selects eight models to star in his exhibition and the TV show. The first task the group undertakes is a lingerie shoot around the center of London. It's an important week for the models as they all try and land spots in the converted London Fashion Week.
2	11 July 2011	
BB, Jay and Areilla head to Paris in the hopes to get signed but only one manages to succeed. Charlotte and Jessye B attend a double blind date set up by Rob. Perou splits the group into pairs for this week's Heroes and Villains photo shoot.
3	18 July 2011	
Rob, Jay and Jesse head to Milan. Rob is asked by his agent to move to Milan for a month which he must now relay to his girlfriend. BB does a shoot in Paris and gets to close Charlotte when he returns. Perou gets the group to take part in a shoot involving paint, to which Jay says he is too tired to take part and Ariella has issues with the skimpy costumes.
4	25 July 2011	
Jesse goes for a T4 audition. BB and Charlotte go on a date. Perou selects Jesse, Jay, Charlotte and Jessye B to take part in this week's shoot – set in the seaside town of Whistable but Jay upsets the others when he gets drunk the night before.
5	1 August 2011	
Jay checks into a spa for a detox. BB, Charlotte, Ariella and Jesse go to Iceland to take part in the Reykajavik fashion week and Perou's latest assignment on the black sand beach in faux fur and underwear. Perou and Ariella clash once again.
6	8 August 2011	
BB tries to get signed to an agency in Milan, whilst Rob and girlfriend Anastasia look into moving there. Ocean, Charlotte and Jessye B go on a girls night out. Jesse sets Ocean up on a blind date with one of his friends. Perou uses Ocean, Jay and Jesse for his woodland shoot.
7	15 August 2011	
BB organises a Burlesque class for himself, Jessye B, Jesse and Charlotte for the latter's birthday. Jesse hears back from his TV presenting audition and performs with his band. Jay, BB, Jesse, Rob and Charlotte pose for a life drawing class to prepare for Perou's nude underwater mermaid shoot.
8	22 August 2011	
Last episode of the series. Perous sends the group to stay in a country manor to prepare for the final shoot and his exhibition is finally uncovered.

== Reception ==
The series, so far, has been met with mixed reviews with critics citing it as yet another set-up reality show along the same lines as Made in Chelsea and Geordie Shore. Metro said "Dirty Sexy Things makes it neither Dirty nor Sexy but really rather boring". Other reviews were less negative stating the cast were "likeable bunch of model archetypes" and that the show "looks like it could offer a modicum of fun".

== See also ==
- Made in Chelsea
