= No Way Out but Forward Go =

...No Way Out but Forward Go

Live album by Killing Joke
- Released: 6 May 2001
- Recorded: 17 August 1985 at Lorelei Festival, St. Goarshausen, Germany; Full House headquarters
- Genres: Post-punk; industrial rock; gothic rock; new wave
- Length: 68:30
- Label: Pilot

Killing Joke live album chronology
BBC in Concert (1995)	...No Way Out but Forward Go (2001)	The Peel Sessions 1979–1981 (2008)

Love Like Blood re-issue
- 2002 issue by Digimode Entertainment

Alternative cover
- 2007 issue by Candlelight Records

...No Way Out but Forward Go is a semi-official live album and video by English post-punk band Killing Joke, recorded on 17 August 1985 at the Lorelei Festival, St. Goarshausen, Germany and originally released in 2001 by Pilot Records. It has been reissued several times, sometimes as Love Like Blood, without the video content.

== Release ==
The recording was licensed by the festival organisers without the band's approval, hence the title. Drummer Paul Ferguson said in 2004: "Well, it was a fantastic day. We had a hoot. The Chili Peppers, Parliament, the Blasters. They were friends of ours. So, the hotel after the show was absolutely a riot... And it was a beautiful place, overlooking the banks of the Rhine. But Killing Joke on at three in the afternoon? Excuse me, but that does not work. And it wasn't a great show. We were just there and doing it. And unfortunately, the guy that released it, released it purely because it was the only material that he could get his hands on. That's unfortunately what's happening now, because there wasn't a lot of material and now people are just trying to make a buck here and there."

...No Way Out but Forward Go was initially released on 6 May 2001 by Pilot Records in a double-disc CD edition, the first disc being a normal audio CD, the second a CD-ROM with live videos of all tracks. It was also released as a double LP, and came, of course, without any video.

It was reissued as Love Like Blood in 2002, without the accompanying videos, by Digimode Entertainment on their Brilliant (budget line) series. A remastered version, also called Love Like Blood, was released in 2007 on Candlelight Records, again without videos and with a slightly altered track listing (see below).

The band's own KJ Records released a version in 2006, which included the video content and original track listing.

== Reception ==
Professional ratings
Review scores
Source	Rating
AllMusic	2.5/5 stars
The Encyclopedia of Popular Music	3/5 stars

Jim Harper of AllMusic felt the album was "hardly a worthy substitute for a studio album, but it does showcase Killing Joke at their finest." Harper criticized the production, saying that "most of the show sounds as if it's been recorded in a rehearsal room, since the audience appears to be almost entirely lifeless", but added that "the band members give it their best effort, however, and throw themselves into the performance wholeheartedly."

== Track listing ==
No.	Title	Writer(s)	Length
1.	"The Hum"	Jaz Coleman, Kevin "Geordie" Walker, Martin Glover, Paul Ferguson	4:46
2.	"Darkness Before Dawn"	Coleman, Walker, Paul Raven, Ferguson	4:53
3.	"Requiem"	Coleman, Walker, Glover, Ferguson	3:07
4.	"Empire Song"	Coleman, Walker, Glover, Ferguson	2:31
5.	"Tabazan"	Coleman, Walker, Raven, Ferguson	4:28
6.	"Night Time"	Coleman, Walker, Raven, Ferguson	4:51
7.	"Kings & Queens"	Coleman, Walker, Raven, Ferguson	4:19
8.	"The Good Samaritan"	Coleman, Walker, Glover, Ferguson	2:28
9.	"Love Like Blood"	Coleman, Walker, Raven, Ferguson	4:21
10.	"Bloodsport"	Coleman, Walker, Glover, Ferguson	3:23
11.	"Complications"	Coleman, Walker, Glover, Ferguson	3:10
12.	"The Wait"	Coleman, Walker, Glover, Ferguson	3:39
13.	"Pssyche"	Coleman, Walker, Glover, Ferguson	5:10
14.	"Eighties"	Coleman, Walker, Raven, Ferguson	3:34
15.	"Wardance"	Coleman, Walker, Glover, Ferguson	3:56
16.	"Chessboards"	Coleman, Walker, Raven, Ferguson	5:25
17.	"Adorations"	Coleman, Walker, Raven, Ferguson	4:18

Note: the CD track listing incorrectly swaps "Chessboards" with "Adorations".

2008 remastered issue
No.	Title	Writer(s)	Length
1.	"The Hum"		4:46
2.	"Darkness Before Dawn"		4:53
3.	"Requiem"		3:07
4.	"Empire Song"		2:31
5.	"Tabazan"		4:28
6.	"Night Time"		4:51
7.	"Kings & Queens"		4:19
8.	"The Good Samaritan"		2:28
9.	"Love Like Blood"		4:21
10.	"Bloodsport"		3:23
11.	"Complications"		3:10
12.	"The Wait"		3:39
13.	"Pssyche"		5:10
14.	"Eighties"		3:34
15.	"Wardance""		3:56
16.	"Tension"	Coleman, Walker, Glover, Ferguson
17.	"Kings & Queens"

== Personnel ==
Killing Joke

- Jaz Coleman – vocals
- Kevin "Geordie" Walker – guitar
- Paul Raven – bass guitar
- Paul Ferguson – drums
- Dave Kovacevic – synthesizer
