= John Peel Session (Deep Turtle EP) =

EP by Deep Turtle
- Released: 1995
- Recorded: 9 October 1994
- Genre: Hardcore punk, mathcore
- Length: 9:20
- Label: Bad Vugum
- Producer: Mike Engles

Deep Turtle chronology
Riva! (1993)	John Peel Session (1995)	Tungo (1995)

John Peel Session is an EP by the Finnish band Deep Turtle. The songs were recorded live at the Maida Vale Studios, London on 9 October 1994 for John Peel's Radio 1 show, broadcast on 11 October 1994. Deep Turtle was the first Finnish band invited on the show. The session was later released on a 7" single and CD by the indie label Bad Vugum.

== Track listing ==
Side A

1. "Toothpaste Tastebred" – 0:37
2. "Tungo" – 2:51
3. "Hedless" – 1:15

Side B

1. "Nohand" – 1:28
2. "Ratua" – 1:49
3. "Gnülf" – 1:20

== Personnel ==
- Pentti Dassum – vocals, guitar
- Tapio Laxström – bass guitar
- Mikko Erjossaari – drums
