= The Peel Sessions Album (Wire album) =

Compilation album by Wire
- Released: 1989
- Recorded: 18 January 1978, 20 September 1978, 11 September 1979
- Genre: Post-punk
- Label: Dutch East India Trading

Wire compilation album chronology
On Returning (1977–1979) (1989)	The Peel Sessions Album (1989)	1985–1990: The A List (1993)

Professional ratings
Review scores
Source	Rating
Allmusic	3/5 stars

The Peel Sessions Album is a compilation album by English rock band Wire. It was released in 1989. It consists of nine recordings done for John Peel between 1978 and 1979.

== Track listing ==
No.	Title	Writer(s)	Length
1.	"Practice Makes Perfect"	Bruce Gilbert, Colin Newman	3:38
2.	"I Am the Fly"	Graham Lewis, Newman	3:49
3.	"Culture Vultures"	Lewis, Newman	1:57
4.	"106 Beats That"	Gilbert, Robert Gotobed, Lewis, Newman	1:07
5.	"The Other Window"	Gilbert, Lewis	2:22
6.	"Mutual Friend"	Lewis, Newman	4:16
7.	"On Returning"	Newman	2:08
8.	"Indirect Enquiries"	Lewis, Newman	4:19
9.	"Crazy About Love"	Wire	15:27

== Personnel ==
Wire

- Graham Lewis – bass guitar, vocals
- Robert Gotobed – drums
- Bruce Gilbert – guitar
- Colin Newman – vocals, guitar

Production

- Annette Green – photography
- Don Walker – remastering
- Vici MacDonald – sleeve design
