= The Peel Sessions 1979–1981 =

Live album by Killing Joke
- Released: 2008
- Recorded: 17 October 1979, 5 March 1980, and 27 April, 29 May and 16 December 1981 at BBC Radio 1 Studio D
- Genre: Post-punk; industrial rock; gothic rock
- Label: E.G.

Killing Joke live albums chronology
No Way Out But Forward Go! (2001)	The Peel Sessions 1979–1981 (2008)	Live at the Forum (2008)

Professional ratings
Review scores
Source	Rating
Allmusic	4/5 stars

The Peel Sessions 1979–1981 is a compilation album collecting the first four sessions recorded by the English post-punk band Killing Joke for the legendary BBC Radio 1 DJ John Peel, plus a session recorded for his colleague Richard Skinner's programme. The sessions had been previously available as bootlegs, but are presented here in pristine sound quality.

== Track listing ==
1. "Pssyche" – 4:58
2. "Wardance" – 3:45
3. "Nuclear Boy" – 3:06
4. "Malicious Boogie" – 2:02
  - Tracks 1–4: Peel Session recorded on 17 October 1979
5. "Change" – 4:20
6. "Tomorrow's World" – 4:54
7. "Complication" – 3:22
  - Tracks 5–7: Peel Session recorded on 5 March 1980
8. "Fall of Because" – 4:16
9. "Tension" – 3:33
10. "Butcher" – 4:36
  - Tracks 8–10: Peel Session recorded on 27 April 1981
11. "Hum" – 4:44
12. "Empire Song" – 3:24
13. "We Have Joy" – 2:52
14. "Chop Chop" – 4:46
  - Tracks 11–14: Peel Session recorded on 16 December 1981
15. "Tension" – 4:13
16. "Unspeakable" – 4:45
17. "Exit" – 2:52
  - Tracks 15–17: Skinner Session recorded on 29 May 1981

== Personnel ==
Killing Joke

- Jaz Coleman - vocals, keyboards
- Kevin "Geordie" Walker - guitar
- Martin "Youth" Glover - bass guitar
- Paul Ferguson - drums
