= The Complete John Peel Sessions (Gary Numan album) =

Live album by Gary Numan
- Released: 2007
- Recorded: 1979, 2001
- Genre: New wave, synthpop
- Length: 77:07
- Label: Maida Vale Records; MVRCD001
- Producer: Bob Sargeant, Tony Wilson, Sam Cunningham

Gary Numan chronology
Jagged (2006)	The Complete John Peel Sessions (2007)	Jagged Live (2007)

Professional ratings
Review scores
Source	Rating
Allmusic	3.5/5 stars

The Complete John Peel Sessions is a CD collection of the radio sessions recorded by English musician Gary Numan for the Radio One DJ John Peel.

It was released in 2007 on the newly formed Maida Vale Records and received generally favourable reviews. It also marked the first time the Pure session had been made commercially available.

The eight-page booklet contains an extensive July 2006 essay by Joel McIver

== Track listing ==
1. "Me! I Disconnect From You" – 3:10
2. "Down in the Park" – 4:20
3. "I Nearly Married a Human" – 6:39
4. "Cars" – 3:17
5. "Airlane" – 3:26
6. "Films" – 2:52
7. "Conversation" – 6:52
8. "Rip" – 5:04
9. "Metal" – 4:02
10. "Pure" – 5:09
11. "My Jesus" – 5:44
12. "Cars" – 4:11
13. "Listen to My Voice" – 5:18
14. "I Can't Breathe" – 5:45
15. "Down in the Park" – 5:15
16. "A Prayer for the Unborn" – 6:00
- Tracks 1–3 recorded 10 January 1979 and transmitted 16 January 1979.
- Tracks 4–7 recorded 29 May 1979 and transmitted 25 June 1979.
- Tracks 8–16 recorded and transmitted 7 February 2001.

== Personnel (tracks 1–3) ==
Gary Numan – vocals, keyboards, guitar

Paul Gardiner – bass

Jess Lidyard – drums

== Personnel (tracks 4–7) ==
Gary Numan – vocals

Chris Payne – keyboards

Billy Currie – keyboards

Paul Gardiner – bass

Cedric Sharpley – drums

== Personnel (tracks 8–16) ==
Gary Numan – vocals

Steve Harris – guitar

Richard Beasley – drums

David Brooks – bass, keyboards

Ade Orange – keyboards
