= BBC in Concert (Killing Joke album) =

Live album by Killing Joke
- Released: October 1995
- Recorded: 6 March 1985, 22 August 1986
- Genre: Post-punk; industrial rock; gothic rock; new wave
- Length: 57:33
- Label: Windsong International

Killing Joke live albums chronology
Ha (1982)	BBC in Concert (1995)	No Way Out but Forward Go (2001)

BBC in Concert is a live album by English post-punk band Killing Joke, released in October 1995 by Windsong International Records.

== Content ==
Tracks 1–10 were recorded at the 1986 Reading Festival in England (on 22 August), while the final three songs were recorded during a 1985 Paris Theatre appearance (on 6 March).

== Reception ==
Professional ratings
Review scores
Source	Rating
AllMusic	2/5 stars
The Encyclopedia of Popular Music	3/5 stars
MusicHound Rock	2.5/5 stars

It has been reviewed as a "better-than-average bootleg" due to the sound quality.

== Track listing ==
1. "Twilight of the Mortals" – 4:47
2. "Chessboards" – 5:36
3. "Kings & Queens" – 4:11
4. "Darkness Before Dawn" – 5:02
5. "Love Like Blood" – 4:44
6. "Sanity" – 4:48
7. "Love of the Masses" – 4:07
8. "Requiem" – 3:19
9. "Complications" – 3:20
10. "Wardance" – 3:50
11. "Tabazan" – 4:34
12. "Tension" – 3:50
13. "Pssyche" – 5:26

== Personnel ==
Killing Joke

- Jaz Coleman – vocals
- Kevin "Geordie" Walker – guitar
- Paul Raven – bass guitar
- Paul Ferguson – drums
- Dave Kovacevic – synthesizer
