= The Peel Sessions Album (Billy Bragg album) =

1991 live album by Billy Bragg

Live album by Billy Bragg
- Released: 1991
- Recorded: 1983–1988
- Genre: Rock
- Length: 55:23
- Label: Strange Fruit

Billy Bragg chronology
The Internationale (1990)	The Peel Sessions Album (1991)	Don't Try This at Home (1991)

Professional ratings
Review scores
Source	Rating
AllMusic	3/5 stars
NME	8/10

The Peel Sessions Album is an album by British rock artist Billy Bragg, released in 1991. It compiles recordings from Bragg's various radio sessions for John Peel's programme, recorded between 1983 and 1988.

"Jeane" is a cover version of a song which appeared as the B-side to the Smiths's single "This Charming Man". "Fear is a Man's Best Friend" is a cover of a song by John Cale and "A13: Trunk Road to the Sea" uses the music of Bobby Troup's classic "Route 66" with new lyrics talking about the A13, a road in east London.

== Track listing ==
All songs by Billy Bragg, except where stated.

1. "Lovers Town"
2. "Between the Wars"
3. "Which Side Are You On?"
4. "A Lover Sings"
5. "Days Like These"
6. "The Marriage"
7. "Jeane" (Morrissey, Johnny Marr)
8. "Greetings to the New Brunette"
9. "Chile Your Waters Run Red through Soweto" (Bernice Johnson Reagon)
10. "She's Got a New Spell"
11. "Valentine's Day Is Over"
12. "The Short Answer"
13. "Rotting on Remand"
14. "A New England"
15. "Strange Things Happen"
16. "This Guitar Says Sorry"
17. "Love Gets Dangerous"
18. "Fear Is a Man's Best Friend" (John Cale)
19. "A13 Trunk Road to the Sea" (Bragg, Bobby Troup)

== Recording dates ==
The following are the dates the tracks were recorded for the John Peel Show sessions.

- Tracks 1 – 21st Feb 84 (Produced by Mark Radcliffe)
- Tracks 2 to 4 – 18th Sep 84 (Produced by Mark Radcliffe)
- Tracks 5 to 7 – 20th Aug 85 (Produced by Ted De Bono)
- Tracks 8, 9 – 2nd Sep 86 (Produced by Dale Griffin)
- Tracks 10 to 13 – 30th Aug 88 (Produced by Mike Robinson)
- Tracks 14 to 19 – 27th Jul 83 (Produced by Ted De Bono)
