= The Peel Sessions (That Petrol Emotion EP) =

EP by That Petrol Emotion
- Released: 1987
- Recorded: 11 June 1985; First transmission: 24 June 1985
- Genre: Alternative rock, Indie
- Label: Strange Fruit
- Producer: John Williams

The Peel Sessions is an EP by Irish indie rock band. It was released by That Petrol Emotion in 1987.

== Track listing ==
1. V2 ((John O'Neill)) - 3:56
2. Lettuce (John O'Neill) - 2:15
3. Blind Spot ((John O'Neill)) - 4:12
4. Can't Stop (John O'Neill/Raymond Gorman) - 2:45

== Personnel ==
The following people worked on the EP:

- Steve Mack: Vocals
- John O'Neill: Guitar
- Raymond Gorman: Guitar
- Damian O'Neill: Bass
- Ciaran McLaughlin: Drums
