= 125 Magazine =

British magazine

- Cover of issue 20 (Autumn–Winter 2012)
- Founders: Perry Curties, Rob Crane, Jason Joyce, Martin Yates
- Categories: Adult/Photography/fashion/art/ideas
- Frequency: Twice yearly
- Founded: 2003
- Final issue Number: 2013; 21
- Country: United Kingdom
- Based in: London
- Language: English
- Website: www.125world.com

125 Magazine was a London, England, based publication for work and ideas by photographers, illustrators and artists around the world.

== Background ==
125 Magazine's founding partners and the core editorial team were photographers Perry Curties and Jason Joyce, and art directors Rob Crane and Martin Yates who started 125 in 2003 after the realization that no unbiased platform for new work by both established and emerging talent existed. The first issue (themed Fashion) was released in the UK and received a nomination in the Magazine Design Awards but was not a commercial success. The magazine grew to a 300-page, 2 kg 'gallery' of new work and ideas by photographers, stylists and illustrators around the world.

In 2013, the publishers and advertisers shut down 125. The magazine reached distribution in 23 countries, with 21 issues and 2 books.

== Print sales ==
125 had a print-sales service which makes all the photography in the magazine available as limited edition art prints through its website. Inclusion in the service is not compulsory but all contributors were offered the chance to participate, with income divided equally between photographer and 125. According to the 125 website they sold in excess of 8000 prints online and through exhibitions with companies and galleries including Paul Smith and St. Lukes advertising agency.

== Contributors ==
Each issue had a theme and contained the work of 20-25 contributors as well as interviews with creative talents such as Nick Knight, Glen Luchford, Sean Ellis, Don McCullin Rankin (photographer), and Magnum Photos.

High-profile names were commissioned to shoot for 125, such as Rankin, Richard Kern, Perou, Christopher Griffith, Alice Hawkins, Mick Rock, Shinichi Maruyama, Ernst Fischer, and Tim Simmons.

== Influences and competitors ==
The 125 founders have cited I-D, and particularly Rankin's Rank Magazine which was a short-lived independent showcase as proof that such a magazine was a viable proposition. In 2003 Tank, Exit and Big Magazine were the closest rivals to 125.
