= Dead Son Rising =

Studio album by Gary Numan
- Released: 15 September 2011
- Recorded: London, Various
- Genre: Industrial rock; gothic rock; dark wave; ambient
- Length: 52:50
- Label: Mortal Records
- Producer: Gary Numan, Ade Fenton

Gary Numan chronology
Jagged (2006)	Dead Son Rising (2011)	Splinter (Songs from a Broken Mind) (2013)

Professional ratings
Aggregate scores
Source	Rating
Metacritic	59/100
Review scores
Source	Rating
AllMusic	3.5/5 stars

Dead Son Rising is the sixteenth solo studio album by the English musician Gary Numan, released on 15 September 2011 by Mortal Records.

On 12 August 2011, The Quietus debuted a radio edit of the song "Dead Sun Rising" on their website. On 28 August 2011, the official Gary Numan website debuted a short "promo edit" of the video for the first single, "The Fall". After the album's release it spent only one week on the UK album charts, entering at number 87 but also reached number 5 in the German alternative albums chart.

== Overview ==
Dead Son Rising grew out of a set of demos Numan had left over from previous projects, but as he explained: 'The original ideas that sparked off these songs are now barely visible. It's grown into another animal, something more experimental.'

The album was co-written and co-produced by Numan with Ade Fenton (Numan's collaborator on his 2006 album Jagged). The tracks "We Are The Lost" and "Dead Sun Rising" both contain elements from a sci-fi fantasy story Numan had been writing over the previous few years. The album also includes two instrumentals, "Resurrection" and "Into Battle", showcasing some of the soundtrack-type material that Numan and Fenton had been working on recently.

== Track listing ==
All lyrics written by Gary Numan; all music composed by Gary Numan and Ade Fenton.

1. "Resurrection" – 3:24
2. "Big Noise Transmission" – 4:20
3. "Dead Sun Rising" – 4:57
4. "When the Sky Bleeds, He Will Come" – 4:47
5. "For the Rest of My Life" – 5:03
6. "Not the Love We Dream Of" – 5:10
7. "The Fall" – 4:19
8. "We Are the Lost" – 5:09
9. "For the Rest of My Life (Reprise)" – 5:44
10. "Into Battle" – 5:05
11. "Not the Love We Dream Of (Piano Version)" – 4:52
12. "Dead Sun Rising (Early Version)" (Bonus Track – Digital Only) – 5:53

An official remix, Dead Sun Rising (Grayed Out Mix), was also made available free online, and would later appear on the remix album Dead Moon Falling.

== Song notes ==
"Big Noise Transmission" had the live working titles of "Captured Underground Noise Transmission" and "Zulu" (the latter on the North American Pleasure Principle Tour in 2010).

"Dead Sun Rising" is a reworked version of "What Have I Become" from the 2006 Jagged sessions, and featured on the "Small Black Box" tour audio programme.

"When The Sky Bleeds, He Will Come" had the live working title of "Dragging Loop".

"For The Rest of My Life" is a reworked version of "Always" from the 2000 Pure sessions, and featured on the "Purified" tour audio programme.

"The Fall" is a reworked version of "Look" from the 2000 Pure sessions, and featured on the "Purified" tour audio programme. It has existed in a variety of different mixes since it debuted live several years ago.

"We Are The Lost" is a reworked version of "Mercy" from the 2006 Jagged sessions, and featured on the "Small Black Box" tour audio programme.

== Super Deluxe Edition ==
The album was released in three different formats.

The Super Deluxe Edition of Dead Son Rising

CD/DVD/VINYL

Same contents as CD, plus:

DVD

1. The Fall Promo Video
2. Behind The Scenes Footage and Interview
3. Exclusive Dead Son Rising interview
4. Slideshow
5. Gallery

12" Vinyl remixes

1. The Fall (Motor Alternative Mix)
2. The Fall (South Central Bad Trip Mix)
3. The Fall (Motor Club Mix)
- Dead Son Rising CD
- DVD with 'The Fall' promo video, interviews, exclusive behind-the-scenes footage, gallery and slide show.
- 48 Page 'Art book' each page is 315mm x 310mm. It has a 7mm spine.
- Each copy is numbered
- Signed Gary Numan Print
- Gatefold Vinyl of Album (excludes Not the Love We Dream of Piano Version)
- Exclusive 12-inch single containing remixes of The Fall by Motor and South Central

== Personnel ==
=== Production ===
- Gary Numan – vocals, keyboards
- Ade Fenton – producer, keyboards, programming, piano
- Tim Muddiman – guitar, bass
- Steve Harris – guitar
- Nathan Boddy – keyboard

== Charts ==
Chart	Peak position
UK Albums (OCC)	87
