= Intruder (album) =

Studio album by Gary Numan
- Released: 21 May 2021
- Recorded: 2020–2021
- Genres: Gothic rock; industrial
- Length: 54:52
- Labels: BMG; The End
- Producer: Ade Fenton

Gary Numan chronology
Savage (Songs from a Broken World) (2017)	Intruder (2021)

Intruder is the nineteenth solo studio album by the English musician Gary Numan, released on 21 May 2021 by BMG and The End. It entered UK Albums Chart at number two, on 28 May 2021.

== Album concept ==
Intruder is a concept album with an apocalyptic theme, and the point of view of an anthropomorphised Earth's anger towards its human inhabitants due to environmental degradation. "The planet sees us as its children now grown into callous selfishness, with a total disregard for its wellbeing, it feels betrayed, hurt, and ravaged. Disillusioned and heartbroken it is now fighting back." Numan explained in an interview. "Essentially, it considers humankind to be a virus attacking the planet. Climate change is the undeniable sign of the Earth saying enough is enough, and finally doing what it needs to do to get rid of us, and explaining why it feels it has to do it." Numan stated that "The idea behind the album actually came from a poem called "Earth" that my youngest daughter Echo wrote. She wrote the poem about the planet being upset, and why it was upset." The original poem is included inside the sleeve of the vinyl edition of the album.

== Critical reception ==
Intruder received an overall score of 77/100 from 8 reviews on Metacritic, indicating "generally favorable reviews". One reviewer called Intruder "one of the finest albums of his career", NME describing the album as "fresh and ambitious" and "thrillingly relevant", and another citing it as one of Numan's "most interesting albums". Paste magazine said "the bracing new climate-change-conscious Intruder—is sketching clear charcoal renderings of the charnel house that awaits us". Songwriter Universe said the album is "an ambitious, compelling collection of songs with a unifying theme". Riff Magazine said the album is "a science fiction soundtrack about the impending climate catastrophe that doesn't need a movie to get its urgent point across." A number of reviewers noted that Intruder was a sequel to his previous album both musically (featuring a similar blending of synthesizer-heavy industrial rock with elements of Middle Eastern music, notably with contributions by Gorkem Sen playing the yaybahar) and thematically, serving as a "complementary narrative" to Savage (Songs from a Broken World).

Intruder entered the UK album chart at number two, on 28 May 2021, but it dropped to number sixty-three the following week and dropped off the chart after that.

== Track listing ==
All tracks are written by Gary Numan, except "A Black Sun", which was written by Gary Numan and Persia Numan. On 27 May 2021, an exclusive "Alt Mix" of "Saints and Liars" was made available from the official store to customers who had pre-ordered the digital version of the album. This version clocks in at 4:44.

Intruder track listing
No.	Title	Length
1.	"Betrayed"	4:43
2.	"The Gift"	6:07
3.	"I Am Screaming"	3:53
4.	"Intruder"	4:24
5.	"Is This World Not Enough"	5:25
6.	"A Black Sun"	5:40
7.	"The Chosen"	4:44
8.	"And It Breaks Me Again"	4:46
9.	"Saints and Liars"	4:01
10.	"Now and Forever"	5:57
11.	"The End of Dragons"	5:12
Total length:		54:52

Deluxe edition bonus track
No.	Title	Length
12.	"When You Fall"	5:12
Total length:		60:04

Vinyl edition bonus tracks
No.	Title	Length
12.	"When You Fall"	5:12
13.	"The End of Dragons" (Alt)	4:58
Total length:		65:02

Digital release bonus track
No.	Title	Length
12.	"Saints and Liars (Alt Mix)"	4:44

== Personnel ==
- Gary Numan – vocals, keyboards
- Ade Fenton – keyboards, programming, mixing, production
- Steve Harris – guitars
- Tim Slade – bass
- Gorkem Sen – strings (Yaybahar)
- Gazelle Twin – backing vocals
- Persia Numan – backing vocals
- Raven Numan – backing vocals
- Nathan Boddy – mixing
- Matt Colton – mastering

== Charts ==
Chart performance for Intruder
Chart (2021)	Peak position
Australian Albums (ARIA)	78
Austrian Albums (Ö3 Austria)	63
Belgian Albums (Ultratop Flanders)	100
Belgian Albums (Ultratop Wallonia)	60
Dutch Albums (Album Top 100)	56
German Albums (Offizielle Top 100)	15
Irish Albums (IRMA)	15
Scottish Albums (Official Charts)	2
Swiss Albums (Schweizer Hitparade)	33
UK Albums (Official Charts)	2
UK Independent Albums (Official Charts)	1
