= Sacrifice (Gary Numan album) =

Studio album by Gary Numan
- Released: 24 October 1994
- Recorded: 1994
- Studio: Outland, London
- Genre: Industrial rock; dark wave; gothic rock
- Length: 45:03
- Label: Numa
- Producer: Gary Numan

Gary Numan chronology
Machine + Soul (1992)	Sacrifice (1994)	Human (1995)

Alternative cover
- Cover of 1997 U.S. Dawn release

Singles from Sacrifice
- 1. "A Question of Faith" Released: 10 October 1994

Professional ratings
Review scores
Source	Rating
AllMusic	2.5/5 stars
Music Week	3/5 stars

Sacrifice is the twelfth solo studio album by the English musician Gary Numan, released in October 1994 by Numa Records. Its release is often cited as marking the start of a critical and artistic rejuvenation for Numan. The album was released in the US in 1997 with a different title, Dawn, based on the comic book character Dawn. It also carried cover art by Joseph Michael Linsner.

A number of tracks displayed an antipathy towards religion, a stance that had been noted in isolated songs from early in Numan's career but which became more pronounced on this album and its successors, Exile (1997) and Pure (2000). While Exile was a fictional story, Numan later stated that "Sacrifice looks at my actual beliefs."

An "extended" version of Sacrifice, approximately twenty five minutes longer than the original, was released in 1995. The same year, most of the tracks appeared on Dark Light, Numan's live recording from the Sacrifice tour.

The album was released in 1999 with extra tracks in the US and UK by Eagle Records (Cleopatra Records). The US edition has a somewhat different selection of extra tracks in addition to new artwork, just like earlier reissues of albums that were first published on Numa Records.

== Production ==
Sacrifice began as a follow-up to Machine & Soul continuing with producer Kipper. This initial project was abandoned when Numan decided to instead self-produce the album and adapt several tracks from his 1994 soundtrack, The Radial Pair: Video Soundtrack. "Metal Beat", later released as a bonus track, was a demo intended for this earlier version of the album, where it would have been the title track, "Vicious".

In a 2000 interview, Numan described his approach to the recording. Prior to Sacrifice, "I spent quite a few years just trying to write songs that would get me back on the radio". For the new album, "I just went right back to the way I was when I was a teenager, first time writing songs, with all the enthusiasm for it". The resultant music, whilst not a commercial success, garnered Numan his best notices in years and coincided with the beginnings of a critical reassessment of his career and acknowledgment of his influence on such artists as Nine Inch Nails, Foo Fighters, Marilyn Manson, The Magnetic Fields, The Prodigy and Afrika Bambaataa.

== Track listing ==
All tracks written by Gary Numan.

=== 1994 Numa CD release (NUMACD 1011) ===
1. "Pray" – 3:55
2. "Deadliner" – 4:29
3. "A Question of Faith" – 4:52
4. "Desire" – 3:47
5. "Scar" – 3:25
6. "Love and Napalm" – 5:08
7. "You Walk in My Soul" – 4:39
8. "Magic" – 4:42
9. "Bleed" – 6:10
10. "The Seed of a Lie" – 5:25

=== 1994 Numa 'Extended' CD release (NUMACDX 1011) ===
1. "Pray" – 5:57
2. "Deadliner" – 8:45
3. "A Question of Faith" – 8:43
4. "Desire" – 5:33
5. "Scar" – 5:25
6. "Love and Napalm" – 8:26
7. "You Walk in My Soul" – 6:54
8. "Magic" – 6:29
9. "Bleed" – 7:41
10. "The Seed of a Lie" – 7:07

=== 1999 Cleopatra U.S. CD reissue (CLP 0336-2) ===
1. "Pray" – 3:55
2. "Deadliner" – 4:29
3. "A Question of Faith" – 4:52
4. "Desire" – 3:47
5. "Scar" – 3:25
6. "Love and Napalm" – 5:08
7. "You Walk in My Soul" – 4:39
8. "Magic" – 4:42
9. "Bleed" – 6:10
10. "The Seed of a Lie" – 5:25
11. "A Question of Faith" (Extended) – 8:43
12. "Love and Napalm" (Extended) – 8:26
13. "Metal Beat" – 3:10 (*)
14. "Play Like God" – 7:01

=== 1999 Eagle Records UK CD reissue (EAMCD076) ===
1. "Pray" – 3:55
2. "Deadliner" – 4:29
3. "A Question of Faith" – 4:52
4. "Desire" – 3:47
5. "Scar" – 3:25
6. "Love And Napalm" – 5:08
7. "You Walk in My Soul" – 4:39
8. "Magic" – 4:42
9. "Bleed" – 6:10
10. "The Seed of a Lie" – 5:25
11. "Play Like God" – 7:01
12. "Whisper of Truth" – 4:21
13. "Metal Beat" – 3:10 (*)
14. "Absolution" – 4:37

== Personnel ==
- Gary Numan – all instruments and vocals, production, arrangements
- Kipper – additional guitar on "Scar", synth bass on "Love and Napalm"
- TJ Davis – backing vocals on "Scar"
