= Ghost (Gary Numan album) =

Live album by Gary Numan
- Released: 1988
- Recorded: 25–26 September 1987, Hammersmith Odeon, London
- Genre: Synthpop, electronic music
- Label: Numa
- Producer: Gary Numan

Gary Numan chronology
| Strange Charm (1986) | Ghost (1988) | Metal Rhythm (1988) |

Alternative cover
- 2003 reissue cover

Professional ratings
Review scores
| Source | Rating |
|---|---|
| AllMusic | 2.5/5 stars |

Ghost is a live album released by British musician Gary Numan in 1988. It was recorded live at the Hammersmith Odeon in London on 25 and 26 September 1987 during Numan's Exhibition Tour (an 18-month concert tour that promoted the compilation album Exhibition). The original release was only available as a fan club, mail order double LP. It went on general release in the United Kingdom as a double CD in May 1992 before being released in the United States in 1999.

Ghost features live versions of several songs from Numan's Strange Charm (1986), an album that had not been promoted with a live concert tour.

== Track listing ==
All tracks written by Gary Numan. All timings are approximate and will vary slightly with different equipment.

=== 1988 Numa vinyl release (NUMAD 1007) ===
Side One

1. "Ghost" – 1.40
2. "Call Out the Dogs" – 4.00
3. "I Die: You Die" – 3.35
4. "Creatures" – 5.05
5. "I Can't Stop" – 3.40
6. "Me! I Disconnect From You" – 3.10

Side Two

1. "Tricks" – 5.35
2. "The Sleeproom" – 5.10
3. "My Breathing" – 6.05
4. "Cars" – 4.40

Side Three

1. "Metal" – 3.10
2. "Sister Surprise" – 6.05
3. "This Disease" – 4.00
4. "We Take Mystery (To Bed)" – 6.15
5. "We Are Glass" – 4.35

Side Four

1. "Are 'Friends' Electric?" – 6.30
2. "Down in the Park" – 4.55
3. "My Shadow in Vain" – 2.30
4. "Berserker" – 5.35

=== 1992 Numa CD reissue (NUMACD 1007) ===
Side One and Two, Three and Four were combined for the CD release.

=== 1999 Cleopatra U.S. CD reissue (CLP 0680-2) ===
Same CD track listing as Numa release. Different rear and inner tray artwork and an essay by Rod Reynolds.

=== 2003 Eagle Records CD reissue (EDMCD 159) ===
Same CD track listing as Numa release. Different front, rear and inner tray artwork and an essay by Dominic Jones.

== Personnel ==
=== Musicians ===
- Gary Numan – vocals
- Rrussell Bell – guitar
- Nick Davies – bass guitar
- Chris Payne – keyboards, viola
- John Webb – keyboards, saxophone
- Greg Brimstone – drums
- Valerie Chalmers – backing vocals
- Emma Chalmers – backing vocals

=== Production ===
- Gary Numan – producer, mixing
- Smudger – engineer
- Tim Summerhayes – engineer, mixing
