= Strange Charm =

Studio album by Gary Numan
- Released: 27 October 1986
- Recorded: 1986
- Studio: Rock City Sound Studios (London)
- Genre: Electronic; industrial; synth-pop; new wave; dark wave
- Length: 44:56
- Label: Numa
- Producer: Gary Numan; The Wave Team; Ade Orange; Bill Sharpe; Nick Smith

Gary Numan chronology
| The Fury (1985) | Strange Charm (1986) | Metal Rhythm (1988) |

Alternative cover
- 1999 UK reissue cover

Singles from Strange Charm
- 1. "This Is Love" Released: April 1986; 2. "I Can't Stop" Released: June 1986; 3. "New Thing from London Town" Released: October 1986

Professional ratings
Review scores
| Source | Rating |
|---|---|
| AllMusic | 3/5 stars |
| Record Mirror | 2/5 stars |

Strange Charm is the eighth solo studio album by the English musician Gary Numan, originally released on 27 October 1986, it was Numan's third release on his self-owned Numa Records label. The album was not released in the United States until 1999 when it was issued in a digitally remastered form with five bonus tracks by Cleopatra Records. In the same year it was also reissued with bonus tracks in the United Kingdom by Eagle Records.

== Background, production and recording ==
Strange Charm was Numan's third studio album release on his Numa Records label. It was recorded at Numan's own Rock City studio in Shepperton. It was conceived differently than his previous albums, writing the songs in the studio and working with several collaborators, such as the production team The Wave Team (Mike Smith and Ian Herron). The PPG Wave synthesizer and the use of sampling were prominent on the album, but there is also a lot of guitar, saxophone by Dick Morrissey, bass guitar played by Martin Elliott and backing vocals by Tessa Niles.

By the time of Strange Charm's recording, Numan had found himself more and more alienated from the mainstream of British pop music, while most of the money he had made during the early part of his career had now been consumed by his costly self-funded record label. Numan later recollected that the studio atmosphere was tense:

It was a hard album to finish. The career problems created a dreadful atmosphere to write in because it felt like everything I was doing was for nothing... I knew I wanted a dark and dreamy sound for Strange Charm. However, I didn't quite know in which direction I wanted to take my songwriting. I was also running out of things to write about. There were quite a few arguments and the studio atmosphere was unusually tense and bad-tempered. At one point I had three different versions of a song on the 24-track and I couldn't decide which way I wanted to go.

Not only did Numan find it very difficult to create the kind of sound that he wanted for Strange Charm, but the protracted recording sessions resulted in the album being recorded in its entirety twice, diluting Numan's enthusiasm for the finished product.

After initial plans of a September release, Strange Charm was finally released in late October 1986, many months after singles from the album had been released. "This Is Love" was released in April and peaked at No. 28 on the UK Singles Chart; "I Can't Stop" was released in June and reached No. 27, and the original version of "New Thing from London Town" was released as a Sharpe & Numan single in October and reached No. 52. The lack of radio airplay for these singles made Numan desillusioned about releasing further singles from the album. The next single "I Still Remember", was a remake of a song from Numan's previous studio album The Fury (1985). Released as a charity single for the RSPCA, "I Still Remember" reached No. 74 on the UK Singles Chart. The Strange Charm album itself peaked at No. 59 on the UK Albums Chart, and spent only two weeks in the Top 75.

For the visual look of Strange Charm, Numan abandoned the white suit-clad persona of The Fury and instead dyed his hair blond (again) and wore a Blade Runner-esque long leather jacket and sunglasses. Blade Runner was also the influence for one of the B-sides of the album, "Time to Die", which takes its title and most of its lyrical content from Roy Batty's dying speech during the climax scene of the film. Strange Charm is the third of five Numan studio albums to feature saxophonist Dick Morrissey, who performed on the Blade Runner (1982) film score. Vocal samples from the film can also be heard on Numan's studio albums The Fury (1985) and Outland (1991). Numan has referred to Blade Runner as "one of my all-time favourite films."

Numan did not support Strange Charm with a live tour (making it his first studio album since 1981's Dance not to be supported by a concert tour). However, Numan embarked on the 18-date "Exhibition Tour" in September 1987 to promote the compilation album Exhibition. A live album, Ghost, was culled from the final two shows of the tour (25–26 September 1987) and released in March 1988. Ghost features live versions of several Strange Charm tracks.

== Different releases ==
Strange Charm was originally released exclusively in the UK. The original cassette release featured "Time to Die" as an extra track at the end of side one. The album saw its first CD reissue on Numan's own Numa label in 1991. It was reissued again in 1996. In 1999 the album was reissued in the UK by Eagle Records in remastered form, with five tracks originally released as B-sides as bonus tracks (including "Time to Die"), new artwork and liner notes. In the same year it was also released in the US by Cleopatra Records, who dropped two of the instrumental bonus tracks of the UK reissue in favour of the extended mixes of "New Thing from London Town" and "I Can't Stop". Additionally the US release used a modified version of the original cover and did not feature liner notes.

== Track listing ==
All tracks written by Gary Numan, except for "New Thing from London Town", which has music by Bill Sharpe and lyrics by Numan.

1986 release

1. "My Breathing" – 6:39
2. "Unknown and Hostile" – 4:29
3. "The Sleeproom" – 5:19
4. "New Thing from London Town" – 5:57
5. "I Can't Stop" – 5:50
6. "Strange Charm" – 5:03
7. "The Need" – 7:07
8. "This Is Love" – 4:32
- The original cassette release included "Time to Die" as an extra track on side one, after "New Thing from London Town".

1999 Cleopatra US CD reissue (CLP 0534-2)

1. "My Breathing" – 6:36
2. "Unknown and Hostile" – 4:31
3. "The Sleeproom" – 5:19
4. "New Thing from London Town" – 5:56
5. "I Can't Stop" – 5:48
6. "Strange Charm" – 5:00
7. "The Need" – 7:07
8. "This Is Love" – 4:31
9. "New Thing from London Town" (12" Version) – 7:57
10. "Time to Die" – 4:19
11. "I Can't Stop" (10" Version) – 6:38
12. "Faces" – 4:54
13. "Survival" – 5:12

1999 Eagle Records CD reissue (EAMCD074)

1. "My Breathing" – 6:39
2. "Unknown and Hostile" – 4:29
3. "The Sleeproom" – 5:19
4. "New Thing from London Town" – 5:57
5. "I Can't Stop" – 5:50
6. "Strange Charm" – 5:03
7. "The Need" – 7:07
8. "This Is Love" – 4:32
9. "Survival" – 5:14
10. "Faces" – 4:54
11. "Time to Die" – 4:18
12. "River" – 3:32
13. "Mistasax (2)" – 3:08
- "River" and "Mistasax (2)" are Numan solo tracks that were used as B-sides to the Radio Heart singles "All Across the Nation" and "Radio Heart", respectively.
- "New Thing from London Town (12" Version)" is the 12" mix of the Sharpe + Numan single version, with lyrics written by Roger Odell instead of Numan. It is exclusive to the U.S. Cleopatra reissue. The original 7" mix has only ever been re-released on the 1999 Numan compilation album, New Dreams for Old: 1984–1998, and was transferred from a vinyl copy because the original master-tape of the song had been lost.

== Personnel ==
Adapted from the Strange Charm liner notes.

Musicians

- Gary Numan – vocals; keyboards; guitar
- Bill Sharpe – keyboards
- Mike Smith – keyboards
- Ade Orange – keyboards; guitar
- Russell Bell – guitar; backing vocals
- Mark Railton – guitar
- Martin Elliott – bass
- Chris Payne – violin
- Dick Morrissey – saxophone
- Ian Herron – drum machine programming
- Roger Odelle – drum programming
- Jess Lidyard – percussion on "The Need"
- Tessa Niles – backing vocals
- Linda Taylor – backing vocals

Production and artwork

- Gary Numan – producer; audio mixing
- The Wave Team – producers
- Ade Orange – producer
- Bill Sharpe – producer
- Nick Smith – producer
- Tim Summerhayes – engineer
- Arun Chekraverty – audio mastering
- Jeff Hanen – audio mastering
- Patti Burris – make-up
- Lewis Ziolek – photography
