= Crossroads Guitar Festival 2004 =

- Directed by: Ron de Moraes
- Produced by: Mitch Owgang
- Starring: Eric Clapton
- Edited by: Laura Young
- Distributed by: Reprise · Warner
- Release date: November 9, 2004
- Running time: 210 minutes
- Country: United Kingdom
- Language: English
- Box office: $69,000,000

The Crossroads Guitar Festival 2004 is a concert film, released by the British rock musician Eric Clapton. It documents live performances and interviews by various guitar players Clapton admires and is the first official Crossroads Guitar Festival. A previous benefit project titled In Concert: A Benefit for the Crossroads Centre at Antigua is sometimes regarded the first festival in the series. The video footage for the release was recorded between June 4 and 6, 2004 in Dallas, Texas. The DVD hit the international market on November 9 the same year and is distributed and licensed through Reprise and Warner Bros. Records.

== Track listing ==
=== Disc 1 ===
1. Eric Clapton – "Cocaine"
2. Robert Lockwood Jr. – "Love in Vain Blues"
3. Eric Clapton, Robert Cray, Hubert Sumlin & Jimmie Vaughan – "Killing Floor"
4. Eric Clapton, Robert Cray, Buddy Guy, Hubert Sumlin & Jimmie Vaughan – "Sweet Home Chicago"
5. Eric Clapton, Robert Cray, Robert Randolph & Jimmie Vaughan – "Six Strings Down"
6. Eric Clapton, Robert Cray, Buddy Guy, B.B. King & Jimmie Vaughan – "Rock Me Baby"
7. Dan Tyminski with Ron Block – "I Am A Man Of Constant Sorrow"
8. Dan Tyminski With Ron Block – "Road To Nash Vegas"
9. James Taylor with Jerry Douglas – "Copperline"
10. James Taylor with Joe Walsh - "Steamroller"
11. Vince Gill with Jerry Douglas - "Oklahoma Borderline"
12. Vince Gill with Jerry Douglas – "What the Cowgirls Do"
13. J. J. Cale with Eric Clapton – "After Midnight"
14. J. J. Cale with Eric Clapton – "Call Me the Breeze"
15. Robert Randolph and the Family Band – "The March"
16. Doyle Bramhall II – "Green Light Girl"
17. Carlos Santana with Eric Clapton – "Jingo"
18. John Mayer – "City Love"

=== Disc 2 ===
1. Vishwa Mohan Bhatt – "Rag Bihag"
2. John McLaughlin – "Tones for Elvin Jones"
3. Larry Carlton – "Josie"
4. David "Honeyboy" Edwards – "Going Down Slow"
5. Eric Clapton – "If I Had Possession Over Judgement Day"
6. Robert Cray – "Time Makes Two"
7. Jonny Lang – "Give Me Up Again"
8. David Hidalgo – "Neighborhood"
9. Steve Vai – "I'm the Hell Outta Here"
10. Eric Johnson – "Desert Rose"
11. Joe Walsh – "Funk 49"
12. Joe Walsh – "Rocky Mountain Way"
13. Eric Clapton – "I Shot the Sheriff"
14. Eric Clapton – "Have You Ever Loved A Woman (Blues In C)"
15. ZZ Top – "La Grange"
16. ZZ Top – "Tush"

== Chart positions ==
=== Weekly charts ===
| Chart (2004–2015) | Peak position |
|---|---|
| Portuguese Music DVD (AFP) | 10 |
| Swedish Music DVD (Sverigetopplistan) | 5 |
| Swiss Music DVD (Schweizer Hitparade) | 4 |

== Certifications ==
| Region | Certification | Certified units/sales |
|---|---|---|
| Australia (ARIA) | 3× Platinum | 45,000^{^} |
| Canada (Music Canada) | 3× Platinum | 30,000^{^} |
| France (SNEP) | Platinum | 20,000^{*} |
| New Zealand (RMNZ) | Platinum | 5,000^{^} |
| United Kingdom (BPI) | Gold | 25,000^{^} |
| United States (RIAA) | 10× Platinum | 1,000,000^{^} |
^{*} Sales figures based on certification alone.^{^} Shipments figures based on certification alone.
