= Change Your Mind (Sharpe & Numan song) =

Single by Sharpe & Numan
- Released: 1 February 1985
- Genre: Synth-pop
- Label: Polydor
- Songwriters: Bill Sharpe; Roger Odell
- Producer: Bill Sharpe

Sharpe & Numan singles chronology
"Change Your Mind" (1985)	"New Thing from London Town" (1985)

"Change Your Mind" is a song recorded by the English synth-pop duo Sharpe & Numan. Written by Shakatak members Bill Sharpe and Roger Odell and featuring lead vocals by Gary Numan.

In 1982 Sharpe was working on the production of Shakatak starting with the "Invitations" album, which was produced at Rock City Studios owned by Numan himself. It was here where Sharpe started production on his first solo album "Famous People". The engineer Nick Smith, who was also working with Numan at the time, suggested that Numan should guest his vocals on the song after it was decided Sharpe would not be appropriate for singing.

The fashion that Numan incorporated with his blue hair, white powdered face and blue tie with a white suit is an amalgamation of his 1984 image of Berserker and his 1985 then upcoming album The Fury.

It was released as a single in February 1985. It was a top 20 hit on the UK Singles Chart, peaking at No. 17 in March 1985. It was also an international success, spending four weeks & peaking 39 in the New Zealand singles chart, 22 in Ireland, 35 in the US Dance Charts and entering the Swedish Trackslistan for one week at number 19.

All songs on the single are included on Bill Sharpe's solo album Famous People (1985). The A-side "Change Your Mind" also appears on the Sharpe & Numan album Automatic, released in 1989.

In 2010, Automatic which the song featured on was repackaged on CD by Polydor.

In 2015 Change Your Mind featured on the 30th Anniversary episode of EastEnders. The episode featured numerous hits from the year 1985.

The song featured on the "Famous People Live" live album in 2018, recorded in 2016. Numan was unable to attend to perform his vocals for the song because he was living in L.A., so he was replaced with Tessa Niles who featured on the original, with a re-arrangement in the song to suit a jazz style. Numan sent over a 30 second message to introduce the song for the show.

== Track listing ==
UK 7" single

1. "Change Your Mind" - 4.10
2. "Remix, Remake, Remodel" - 3.59

UK 12" single

1. "Change Your Mind" - 8.30
2. "Remix, Remake, Remodel" - 3.59
3. "Fools in a World" - 3.43

US 12" single

1. "Change Your Mind" (Razormaid Version) - 7:25
2. "Change Your Mind" (Single Version) - 4:04
3. "Change Your Mind" (Extended Version) - 8:30

== Charts ==
Country	Peak position
UK Singles (OCC)	17
Sweden (Trackslistan)	19
Ireland (IRMA)	22
U.S. Billboard Dance Club Songs	35
New Zealand (Recorded Music NZ)	39
