= The Skin Mechanic =

Live album by Gary Numan
- Released: October 1989
- Recorded: 29 September 1988 at Dominion Theatre, London
- Genre: New wave, synthpop, electronic
- Length: 59:39
- Label: Illegal Records, IRS Records
- Producer: Gary Numan

Gary Numan chronology
Automatic (1989)	The Skin Mechanic (1989)	Outland (1991)

Professional ratings
Review scores
Source	Rating
AllMusic	2/5 stars
Record Mirror	3/5 stars

The Skin Mechanic is a live album released by the English musician Gary Numan during his stint with IRS Records. The album was recorded in 1988 and released in 1989.

Throughout September and October 1988, Numan embarked on an 18-date UK live tour to support his latest studio album, Metal Rhythm. The Skin Mechanic (which took its name from a lyric in the Metal Rhythm song "Hunger") was recorded at the Dominion Theatre, London on 28 September 1988. The album was released over a year later, in October 1989. It charted at UK#55, and was followed by a 1990 video release of the 1989 tour, also confusingly called The Skin Mechanic.

A remastered CD reissue appeared in 1999 with a shuffled track order (but no additional tracks) and a much expanded booklet that contained the lyrics and an essay by Steve Malins.

== Track listing ==
All tracks written by Gary Numan.

All timings are approximate and will vary slightly with different equipment.

=== 1989 IRS Records CD release (EIRSACD 1019) ===
1. "Survival" – 2:12
2. "Respect" – 4:09
3. "Call Out The Dogs" – 4:04
4. "Cars" – 5:20
5. "Hunger" – 4:30
6. "Down in the Park" – 5:24
7. "New Anger" – 3:13
8. "Creatures" – 5:06
9. "Are 'Friends' Electric?" – 7:46
10. "Young Heart" – 4:58
11. "We Are Glass" – 5:05
12. "I Die: You Die" – 3:58
13. "I Can't Stop" – 3:16

=== 1999 EMI CD reissue (7243 5 21406 2 6) ===
1. "Survival" – 2:12
2. "Respect" – 4:09
3. "Call Out The Dogs" – 4:04
4. "Cars" – 5:20
5. "Hunger" – 4:30
6. "Down in the Park" – 5:24
7. "New Anger" – 3:13
8. "Creatures" – 5:06
9. "Young Heart" – 4:58
10. "Are 'Friends' Electric?" – 7:46
11. "We Are Glass" – 5:05
12. "I Can't Stop" – 3:16
13. "I Die: You Die" – 3:58
- There is no explanation for the shuffled track listing on the 1999 reissue.

== Musicians ==
- Gary Numan – vocals
- Rrussell Bell – guitar
- Andy Coughlan – bass
- Chris Payne – keyboards, violin
- Ade Orange – keyboards, saxophone
- Cedric Sharpley – drums
- John Webb – miming saxophone
- Val Chalmers – vocals
- Emma Chalmers – vocals
