= Chas Jankel (album) =

Studio album by Chaz Jankel
- Released: 1980
- Studio: Various: C.J.M. Studios; The Town House
- Genre: Funk; blue-eyed soul; post-disco; reggae
- Length: 40:21
- Label: A&M
- Producer: Chaz Jankel; Peter Van Hooke; Mark Isham; Chris Warwick

Chaz Jankel chronology
Chas Jankel (1980)	Chasanova (1981)

Singles from Chas Jankel
- 1. "Ai No Corrida" Released: 1980; 2. "Am I Honest With Myself Really?" Released: 1981

Professional ratings
Review scores
Source	Rating
AllMusic	4.5/5 stars

Chas Jankel is the debut solo studio album by the English singer and multi-instrumentalist Chaz Jankel. It was originally released in 1980, on the label A&M. Ian Dury and The Blockheads's first and only album without Jankel, Laughter, was released the same year.

The first track on the album "Ai No Corrida", was covered by Quincy Jones a year later in 1981 and was a UK chart hit for him. The song has also been covered by the Nylons and Laura More with Uniting Nations.

The album was re-issued in 2005 on Angel Air in the United Kingdom as a digitally remastered CD, featuring one bonus track, "Little Eva" which was co-written by Jankel with Ian Dury and was originally released on Jankel's 1985 album Looking at You.

The track "Reverie" was used as a sample by Brooklyn-based hip hop collective Pro Era in the song, "Like Water", which is featured on the group's second mixtape as a collective, "P.E.E.P: The aPROcalypse" (2012).

== Track listing ==
All tracks are written by Chaz Jankel, except where noted

Side one
No.	Title	Writer(s)	Length
1.	"Ai No Corrida"	Chaz Jankel; Kenny Young	9:10
2.	"Peace, At Last"		2:50
3.	"Just a Thought"	Jankel; Mark Newton-Carter	5:16
4.	"Lenta Latina"		3:53

Side two
No.	Title	Writer(s)	Length
5.	"Fuse"	Mark Isham; Peter Van Hooke	0:35
6.	"Am I Honest with Myself Really?"	Jankel; Newton-Carter	14:51
7.	"Reverie"		3:46
Total length:			40:21

Bonus track on the 2005 reissue
No.	Title	Writer(s)	Length
8.	"Little Eva"	Jankel; Ian Dury	4:58

== Personnel ==
Credits are adapted from the album's liner notes.

- Chaz Jankel – lead and background vocals; guitar; keyboards; synthesizer; percussion
- Mark Isham – soprano saxophone; trumpet; synthesizer
- Chris Hunter – alto saxophone; tenor saxophone
- Peter Van Hooke – drums; percussion
- Chris Warwick – synthesizer programming; percussion
- Kuma Harada – bass guitar on "Just a Thought", and "Lenta Latina"
- Paul Westwood – bass guitar on "Ai No Corrida"

Production team

- Chaz Jankel – producer; sleeve concept
- Peter Van Hooke – producer; inner sleeve photography
- Mark Isham – producer
- Chris Warwick – producer
- Chris Jenkins – engineer
- Mick Glossop – engineer
- Philip Bagenal – engineer
- Steve Prestage – engineer
- Michael Ross – art direction
- Simon Ryan – design
- Mike Putland – back cover photography

== See also ==
- List of albums released in 1980
