= Blue (Scottish band) =

Scottish musical group

- Origin: Glasgow, Scotland
- Genres: Pop rock, soft rock
- Years active: 1973–1979; 1983–present
- Labels: RSO, Rocket
- Members: Hughie Nicholson; Ian MacMillan; David Nicholson
- Past members: Timi Donald; Jimmy McCulloch; Robert Smith; Charlie Smith

Blue are a Scottish pop rock band, formed in Glasgow in 1973. The band currently consists of Hughie Nicholson, Ian MacMillan and David Nicholson.

== Career ==
Formed and fronted by ex-Marmalade guitarist Hughie Nicholson, Blue signed to RSO Records and released their eponymous debut album the same year. Nicholson was a member of Marmalade between 1971 and 1973, writing fifteen songs to fulfil their Decca recording contract, including the hits, "Cousin Norman", "Back on the Road", and "Radancer" before he left to form Blue. He wrote the majority of Blue's material, including their most recognised number, "Gonna Capture Your Heart". Earlier in his life, he had been a member of the 1960s Scottish rock outfit, the Poets.

Blue's debut single "Little Jody" failed to chart. The original album version was recorded before Jimmy McCulloch joined the band, although the single release featured him. The single version of "Little Jody" appeared on a compilation album, 20 in 2002. They then added another guitarist, Robert "Smiggy" Smith (born 30 March 1946, Kiel, Germany) before recording and issuing their second album, Life in the Navy.

This revised line-up did not last for long, following a dispute with RSO, only MacMillan and Nicholson remained. The duo then added Charlie Smith (drummer) and David Nicholson (bass), and it was this line-up that signed to Elton John's record label named The Rocket Record Company and scored a US Billboard Hot 100 chart entry, and a UK Singles Chart top 20 hit, with "Gonna Capture Your Heart". It was their debut release from the Another Night Time Flight album which was produced by Elton John and Clive Franks. Blue released two other singles from the album which both failed to enter the UK Singles Chart.

They released one other album for Rocket; Fools' Party (1979) before parting company and re-locating to Los Angeles, California. They spent three years compiling new material and playing the local clubs such as The Roxy, The Troubadour, The Palomino, Madame Wong's and the Central Club (later The Viper). Unsuccessful in securing a contract with their new material, they returned to the UK in 1983, shortly before which Blue released the single "Don't Wanna Make You Cry" / "Moonlight" on the Zuma label (1982). Nicholson released "Love You Made a Fool of Me" (1984), and whilst continuing to record with MacMillan, also wrote and produced four singles with Gary Numan on lead vocals; "Radio Heart", "London Times" and "All Across the Nation" which were released under the name Radio Heart in 1987, and "Like a Refugee (I Won't Cry)" released under the name Numan & Dadadang in 1994. The first two releases entered the UK chart.

In 2003, the remaining personnel Hugh and David Nicholson plus Ian MacMillan took the then high flying boy band Blue to court. It was a high profile High Court case over the use of the band's name, but the judge opined that "it is not difficult to distinguish between the present day pop group, and the original users of the group's title". They subsequently came to an agreement that they could continue to share the name.

== Members ==
Current members

- Hugh Nicholson (born 30 July 1949, Rutherglen, Strathclyde, Scotland) — guitar / vocals / keyboards (1973–1979, 1983–present)
- Ian MacMillan (born 16 October 1947, Paisley, Scotland) — bass guitar / vocals (1973–1979, 1983–present)
- David Nicholson - bass (1974–present)

Former members

- Timmy Donald (born Bruce Timmy Donald, 29 September 1946, Bristol, Somerset, England) — drums (1973–1979, 1983–present) (1973-1974)
- Jimmy McCulloch - guitar (1973)
- Robert Smith - guitar (1974)
- Charlie Smith - drums (1974-2003)

== Discography ==
=== Albums ===
- Blue (1973) (RSO)
- Life in the Navy (1974) (RSO)
- Another Night Time Flight (1977) (Rocket)
- Fool's Party (1979) (Rocket)
- Country Blue (1999)
- L.A. Sessions (1999)
- Blue 20 (Greatest Hits, 2002)
- Heaven Avenue (2003)

=== Singles ===
- "Little Jody" (1973) (non-chart debut, re-released in 2002)
- "Lonesome" (1974)
- "Cookie in a Jar" (1975)
- "Round and Round" (1975)
- "Another Night Time Flight" (1977)
- "Gonna Capture Your Heart" (1977) - UK No. 18, US No. 88
- "Bring Back the Love" (1977)
- "I Understand" (1977)

== See also ==
- List of one-hit wonders on the UK Singles Chart
- List of Peel sessions
