= The Fury (album) =

1985 album by Gary Numan

Studio album by Gary Numan
- Released: 16 September 1985
- Recorded: 1985
- Studio: Rock City Studios, Shepperton (Surrey, England)
- Genre: Synth-pop; funk rock; new wave; industrial rock; dark wave
- Length: 41:45
- Label: Numa
- Producer: Gary Numan, The Wave Team, Colin Thurston

Gary Numan chronology
| Berserker (1984) | The Fury (1985) | Strange Charm (1986) |

Alternative cover
- 1999 UK reissue cover

Alternative cover
- 1998 U.S. reissue cover

Singles from The Fury
- 1. "Your Fascination" Released: July 1985; 2. "Call Out the Dogs" Released: September 1985; 3. "Miracles" Released: November 1985; 4. "I Still Remember" Released: November 1986

Professional ratings
Review scores
| Source | Rating |
|---|---|
| AllMusic | 2.5/5 stars |
| Record Mirror | 1/5 stars |

The Fury is the seventh solo studio album by the English musician Gary Numan, originally released on 16 September 1985, it was Numan's second release on his self-owned Numa Records label. It saw him continuing to explore the sample-heavy industrial sound that he had developed for his previous album Berserker in 1984.

== Background, production and recording ==
Although Numan's previous album Berserker had failed to make a notable commercial impact, Numan decided to continue with a similar sound for his next album. For the second time in his career he decided to team up with other people to produce his album, recruiting the Wave Team (Mike Smith, Ian Herron) as his co-producers. Colin Thurston assisted on the production of one track.

The Fury continued with the highly sampled, metallic, industrial sound heard on Berserker but added layers of electro-funk that he had previously experimented with on I, Assassin (1982) and Warriors (1983). The style would become a crucial part of his music as the 1980s progressed. As on Berserker, the rhythm section is dominated by aggressive electronic percussion and usage of samples, but the fretless bass that had been an important element on the previous album disappeared almost completely, with only three tracks on the new album featuring real bass. The rhythm elements were balanced with the usage of the PPG Wave synthesiser, saxophonist Dick Morrissey (who had appeared on Warriors) again provided the more melodic elements, while guitars were virtually non-existent. Tessa Niles and Tracy Ackerman contributed female backing vocals, similar to those already heard on Berserker, which would be another continuing theme in Numan's work until the early 1990s. Of the album, Numan later recalled:

The Fury possesses a very metallic, industrial feel. It's rhythmic and funky, using a wide range of staccato sounds built up throughout our experimental time with the PPG. In fact it was the first time I'd written a complete album in the studio. Until then I sat at home working out the melodies on the piano. On The Fury we went into the studio and worked on the grooves first, which were all electronic. There are no real drums, very little conventional bass playing and virtually no guitar on the album. It was more spontaneous in many ways than how I'd worked before.

The usage of sampling on the album is especially prominent on the album's anthemic opening track (and second single), "Call Out the Dogs", which uses several easily recognisable samples taken from the 1982 science fiction film Blade Runner. This marked the beginning of Numan's fascination with the film that would also resurface on his next three studio albums, Strange Charm (1986), Metal Rhythm (1988), and Outland (1991).

Numan supported The Fury with a 17-date live UK tour in September and October 1985. No live albums or videos have been released officially from the tour.

== Cover artwork ==
The original album cover artwork was very much at odds with the music, featuring an oddly Bryan Ferry-esque Numan dressed in a white suit with a red bow-tie, posing in a tilted photograph against a white-dominant background, with the album name written on a typeface reminding the viewer of 1950s futurism. Numan later admitted that the cover was "completely inappropriate," "probably did the album a great disservice" and made him look like "the man who lost it all at Monte Carlo".

== Release ==
"Your Fascination", "Call Out the Dogs", and "Miracles" were released as singles in rapid-fire succession in August, September and November 1985, charting at No. 46, No. 49, and No. 49, respectively. This was quite a poor turn-around compared to Numan's previous success (of his previous solo singles, only "My Dying Machine" had charted lower at No. 66). Numan blamed the singles' poor chart positions on the total lack of radio airplay that they had received. In November 1986 a version of "I Still Remember" was released as a charity single, with all of the proceeds going to the RSPCA. Numan wrote and sung new lyrics for this version, changing the personal anguish theme of the original for a story of a dog mistreated by its owners and eventually dying at the end of the song.

Despite the lack of successful singles, The Fury peaked at No. 24 on the UK Albums Chart, higher than both Berserker and the White Noise (1985) live album released earlier the same year. The Fury remains the highest-charting album ever released by Numa Records, and was the last of Numan's albums to reach the UK Top 30 until 2013 with the release of Splinter (Songs from a Broken Mind) reaching No. 20 on the UK Album Chart.

== Different releases ==
The album was originally released in the UK on both LP, CD and cassette. A second cassette version was also available containing extended mixes of all nine tracks; these extended mixes were released on CD in 1996. In 1998 the album was issued on CD for the first time in the United States by Cleopatra Records. This release added five bonus tracks, including three alternate versions of songs on the album, and a cover photograph different from the UK release. The following year, the album was reissued on CD in the UK by Eagle Records. This issue also featured five bonus tracks, but dropped the alternate versions in favour of three additional out-takes. This reissue also used a cover artwork similar but not identical to the original UK cover, with Numan's red bow-tie re-coloured white, amongst other changes.

== Track listing ==
All tracks written by Gary Numan, except "This Disease" and "Tricks", which were co-written by Numan with Andy Coughlan.

All timings are approximate and will vary slightly with different equipment.

=== 1985 Numa vinyl release (NUMA1003) ===
1. "Call Out the Dogs" – 4:42
2. "This Disease" – 4:04
3. "Your Fascination" – 4:46
4. "Miracles" – 3:40
5. "The Pleasure Skin" – 4:10
6. "Creatures" – 5:10
7. "Tricks" – 5:43
8. "God Only Knows" – 5:26
9. "I Still Remember" – 4:04

=== 1991 Numa CD reissue (CDNUMA 1003) ===
1. "Call Out the Dogs" – 4:42
2. "This Disease" – 4:04
3. "Your Fascination" – 4:46
4. "Miracles" – 3:40
5. "The Pleasure Skin" – 4:10
6. "Creatures" – 5:10
7. "Tricks" – 5:43
8. "God Only Knows" – 5:26
9. "I Still Remember" – 4:04

=== 1996 Numa CD reissue (NUMACDX 1003) ===
1. "Call Out the Dogs" – 6:47
2. "This Disease" – 5:19
3. "Your Fascination" – 5:14
4. "Miracles" – 4:22
5. "The Pleasure Skin" – 5:03
6. "Creatures" – 6:40
7. "Tricks" – 6:21
8. "God Only Knows" – 6:38
9. "I Still Remember" – 5:24
- All of the tracks on this version of the album feature extended running times.

=== 1998 Cleopatra U.S. CD reissue (CLP 0389-2) ===
1. "Call Out the Dogs" – 4:42
2. "This Disease" – 4:04
3. "Your Fascination" – 4:46
4. "Miracles" – 3:40
5. "The Pleasure Skin" – 4:10
6. "Creatures" – 5:10
7. "Tricks" – 5:43
8. "God Only Knows" – 5:26
9. "I Still Remember" – 4:04
10. "Call Out the Dogs" (Extended) – 6:47
11. "I Still Remember" (12" Version) – 5:22
12. "Anthem" – 3:29
13. "Tribal" – 5:57
14. "The Fear" ('95 Remix) – 6:16
- "Tribal" is a demo version of "Call Out the Dogs".
- "I Still Remember" was released as a single in 1986 for the RSPCA charity with different lyrics. The 12" version is currently only available on CD exclusive to the U.S. Cleopatra reissue.
- "The Fear" (95 remix) is actually the original full-length version from the "Miracles" 12" single.

=== 1999 Eagle Records UK CD reissue (EAMCD073) ===
1. "Call Out the Dogs" – 6:47
2. "This Disease" – 4:04
3. "Your Fascination" – 4:46
4. "Miracles" – 3:40
5. "The Pleasure Skin" – 4:10
6. "Creatures" – 5:10
7. "Tricks" – 5:43
8. "God Only Knows" – 5:26
9. "I Still Remember" – 4:04
10. "We Need It" – 7:01
11. "Anthem" – 3:29
12. "No Shelter" – 1:54
13. "Puppets" – 5:26
14. "The Fear" ('95 Remix) – 6:16
- The version of "Call Out the Dogs" that opens this edition is actually the extended 6:47 mix (rather than the regular 4:42 album mix), but is not listed as such.
- The song "Puppets" was originally released as the B-side of the 1986 single version of "I Still Remember", and features samples from the 1980 film The Blues Brothers.

=== 2025 Extended; Remaster ===
| No. | Title | Length |
|---|---|---|
| 1. | "Call Out the Dogs (2025 Remaster)" | 4:38 |
| 2. | "This Disease (2025 Remaster)" | 4:02 |
| 3. | "Your Fascination (2025 Remaster)" | 4:45 |
| 4. | "Miracles (2025 Remaster)" | 3:37 |
| 5. | "The Pleasure Skin (2025 Remaster)" | 4:09 |
| 6. | "Creatures (2025 Remaster)" | 5:10 |
| 7. | "Tricks (2025 Remaster)" | 5:39 |
| 8. | "God Only Knows (2025 Remaster)" | 5:27 |
| 9. | "I Still Remember (2025 Remaster)" | 4:03 |
| 10. | "We Need It (2025 Remaster)" | 7:01 |
| 11. | "Anthem (2025 Remaster)" | 3:29 |
| 12. | "No Shelter (2025 Remaster)" | 1:54 |
| 13. | "Puppets (2025 Remaster)" | 5:26 |
| 14. | "The Fear (2025 Remaster)" | 6:16 |
| 15. | "Tribal (Demo) [2025 Remaster]" | 5:53 |
| 16. | "Call Out the Dogs (Extended Version) [2025 Remaster]" | 6:43 |
| 17. | "This Disease (Extended Version) [2025 Remaster]" | 5:17 |
| 18. | "Your Fascination (Extended Version) [2025 Remaster]" | 5:11 |
| 19. | "Miracles (Extended Version) [2025 Remaster]" | 4:19 |
| 20. | "The Pleasure Skin (Extended Version) [2025 Remaster]" | 5:00 |
| 21. | "Creatures (Extended Version) [2025 Remaster]" | 6:38 |
| 22. | "Tricks (Extended Version) [2025 Remaster]" | 6:19 |
| 23. | "God Only Knows (Extended Version) [2025 Remaster]" | 6:37 |
| 24. | "I Still Remember (Extended Version) [2025 Remaster]" | 5:21 |
| Total length: | | 121:54 |

== Personnel ==
Adapted from The Fury liner notes.

- Gary Numan – lead and background vocals; keyboards
- The Wave Team – PPG Wave programming
- Mike Smith – keyboards
- Ian Herron – guitar
- Andy Coughlan – bass
- Martin Elliott – bass
- Tessa Niles – backing vocals
- Tracy Ackerman – backing vocals
- Dick Morrissey – saxophone
- Ian Richie – saxophone

Production

- Gary Numan – producer
- The Wave Team – producers
- Colin Thurston – producer
- Pete Buhlmann – engineer
- Andy Reilly – assistant engineer
- Gordon Vickery – mastering
- Brian Ward – photographer
