= This Is Love (Gary Numan song) =

Single by Gary Numan

from the album Strange Charm
- B-side: "Survival"
- Released: April 1986
- Studio: Rock City Sound (London)
- Length: 4:30
- Label: Numa
- Songwriter: Gary Numan
- Producers: Gary Numan; The Waveteam

Gary Numan singles chronology
"Miracles" (1985)	"This Is Love" (1986)	"I Can't Stop" (1986)

"This Is Love" is a song by the English musician Gary Numan, released in April 1986 by Numa Records as the lead single from his eighth studio album Strange Charm. It was written by Numan, and produced by Numan and the Waveteam. "This Is Love" peaked at No. 28 on the UK singles chart and remained in the charts for three weeks.

A music video was filmed to promote the single. Early copies of the single included a free interview flexi disc, while some 12" copies were issued with "Call Out the Dogs" as a free single.

== Critical reception ==
Upon its release, Newcastle Evening Chronicle described the song as a "slow romantic ballad" and Numan's "best in ages". Andy Hurt of Sounds wrote, "Maggie's self-made automaton has finally come to rest in Bowie/Eno 'Warszawa'-land, and he's still forgetting to take a packet of tunes to the studio." In a retrospective review of the album, Ned Raggett of AllMusic stated, "Numan uses silence and less-crowded arrangements to create a more dramatic impact. Flat-out successes such as "The Sleeproom" and the concluding ballad "This Is Love," with heavily echoed piano and singing leading the way, show how his decision worked wonders." In 2007, Mojo described the song as a "classy track".

== Track listing ==
7" single

1. "This Is Love" – 4:30
2. "Survival" – 5:02

12" single

1. "This Is Love" – 4:30
2. "Survival" – 5:02

12" single (UK edition with free single)

1. "This Is Love" – 4:30
2. "Survival" – 5:02
3. "Call Out the Dogs" – 6:42
4. "No Shelter" – 3:23
5. "This Ship Comes Apart" – 3:55

== Personnel ==
Musicians

- Gary Numan – vocals, keyboards
- Martin Elliott – bass guitar
- Dick Morrissey – saxophone
- Mike Smith – keyboards
- Tessa Niles – backing vocals

Production and artwork

- Gary Numan – producer
- The Waveteam – producers
- Tim Summerhayes – engineer
- Arun Chakraverty – mastering
- Francis Drake – artwork

== Charts ==
Chart (1986)	Peak position
UK singles chart	28
