= Automatic (Sharpe & Numan album) =

Studio album by Sharpe & Numan
- Released: 26 June 1989
- Recorded: Early 1988
- Genre: Synth-pop; new wave
- Length: 54:28
- Label: Polydor; 839,520-2
- Producer: Bill Sharpe

Gary Numan chronology
Metal Rhythm (1988)	Automatic (1989)	Outland (1991)

Bill Sharpe chronology
Automatic (1989)	Famous People (1989)

Singles from Automatic
- 1. "Change Your Mind" Released: 1 February 1985; 2. "No More Lies" Released: 18 January 1988; 3. "I'm on Automatic" Released: 22 May 1989

Professional ratings
Review scores
Source	Rating
AllMusic	3.5/5 stars

Automatic is a 1989 album released by Sharpe & Numan (a collaboration between Gary Numan and jazz keyboardist/producer Bill Sharpe, member of the jazz fusion group Shakatak).

== Background ==
Automatic was an attempt to recapture the success of Sharpe & Numan's collaboration single "Change Your Mind", which reached number 17 in the UK charts in 1985. Although "Change Your Mind" was initially supposed to be a one-off single, Numan recalled that "the whole experience was great fun and Bill and I left the door open for more work together." However, Numan was ambivalent about recording a Sharpe + Numan album:

After the third Sharpe and Numan single we decided to make a Sharpe and Numan album. My dad talked about it as a 'second string to our bow.' I like Bill very much, he is a very gifted writer and player, but I didn't really want a second string to my bow. I was concerned, as I had been from the start with all the collaborations I was 'encouraged' to get involved in, that it would alienate and drive away the few fans I had left. Loyalty could only be stretched so far.

Numan wrote the song lyrics on Automatic and performed the lead vocals, however, he did not contribute to the writing of the album's music. Backing vocals were provided by Tessa Niles, who had sung on Numan's four preceding solo albums. Automatic has a more lightweight-pop and commercial style in comparison to Numan's solo material of the time, although its sound is not especially incongruous in the Numan discography. The opening line of the track "I'm on Automatic" ("This is metal rhythm/A new song on the radio") explicitly references Metal Rhythm, Numan's previous solo album. Most of the album was recorded in late 1987 and part of 1988, but took 18 months for the deal to come together with Polydor Records.

== Release ==
Automatic includes "Change Your Mind" and a remixed version of the third Sharpe + Numan single, "No More Lies" (1988, UK#34). The second Sharpe + Numan single, "New Thing from London Town" (1986, UK#52) was not included on Automatic, presumably because it had already been included (albeit in re-recorded form) on Numan's 1986 solo album, Strange Charm. "I'm on Automatic" was the only single to be released from Automatic; it reached No. 44 on the UK singles chart. The album itself reached No. 59 on the UK Albums Chart, eleven spots lower than Metal Rhythm, which was released nine months before. Its disappointing sales led to plans for a second Sharpe + Numan album being abandoned, however, the electro-jazz-pop style of Automatic would influence the general sound of Numan's next solo album, Outland (1991).

Numan expressed dissatisfaction with Automatic's lack of promotion on the part of Polydor Records. Of the album itself, he recalled:

I had nothing against the Sharpe and Numan album. I think it's a good album actually, well written and beautifully produced. If my own [solo] career had been going well I would have had no qualms whatsoever about making that album, because my own status and musical direction would have been solid and successful. It was because my own career was taking on a slightly aimless feel that I was so concerned.

=== Re-release ===
Automatic was out of print for two decades; it was re-released on 18 October 2010 by the London-based reissue label Cherry Pop (CRPOP67). This expanded edition features additional tracks, extensive sleevenotes by Steve Thorpe, track comments from Bill Sharpe & Gary Numan, lyrics to all tracks, and remastered sound by Tim Turan. The release is a Captain Oi! Production (the same team behind the label's Kim Wilde and Animotion reissues released in 2009–2010).

== Track listing ==
=== 1989 edition ===
All tracks were written by Gary Numan and Bill Sharpe except where otherwise noted.

1. "Change Your Mind" (Sharpe, Roger Odell) – 4:14
2. "Turn Off the World" – 3:58
3. "No More Lies" ('89 mix) – 4:02
4. "Breathe in Emotion" – 3:25
5. "Some New Game" – 4:01
6. "I'm on Automatic" – 4:08
7. "Rip it Up" – 4:13
8. "Welcome to Love" – 3:30
9. "Voices" (Numan, Sharpe, Odell) – 3:50
10. "Night Life" – 3:41
11. "No More Lies" (original 12" mix)* – 7:46
12. "I'm on Automatic" (12" mix)* – 7:33
- CD bonus tracks marked with an asterisk.

=== 2010 edition ===
All tracks were written by Gary Numan and Bill Sharpe except where otherwise noted.

1. "Change Your Mind" (Sharpe, Roger Odell) – 4:12
2. "Turn Off the World" – 3:58
3. "No More Lies" ('89 mix) – 4:01
4. "Breathe in Emotion" – 3:25
5. "Some New Game" – 4:00
6. "I'm on Automatic" – 4:08
7. "Rip it Up" – 4:13
8. "Welcome to Love" – 3:29
9. "Voices" (Numan, Sharpe, Odell) – 3:49
10. "Night Life" – 3:42
11. "Love Like a Ghost" (single B-side) – 3:27
12. "No More Lies" (7" version) – 3:25
13. "I'm on Automatic" (12" extended version) – 7:34
14. "Voices" (extended version) – 5:34
15. "No More Lies" (12" extended version) – 7:44

Sharpe and Numan tracks not included on this re-release include the 12" extended version of "Change Your Mind"; all known versions of "New Thing from London Town" (original single version, the extended 12" version, and the Strange Charm remake), and the unreleased demo "They Say."

== Personnel ==
=== Musicians ===
- Gary Numan – lead vocals
- Bill Sharpe – keyboards
- Roger Odell – drums
- Tessa Niles – backing vocals
- John Davies – synthesiser programming (tracks 2 to 12)
- Mitch Dalton – guitar (tracks 2, 5 and 7)
- Linda Taylor – backing vocals (track 1)

=== Production ===
- Bill Sharpe – producer
- Nick Smith – mixer, engineer
- Wally Brill – mixer (track 1)
