= I Can't Stop (Gary Numan song) =

Single by Gary Numan

from the album Strange Charm
- B-side: "Faces"
- Released: June 1986
- Studio: Rock City Sound (London)
- Length: 3:23 (7" version); 5:50 (album version); 6:48 (12" version)
- Label: Numa
- Songwriter: Gary Numan
- Producers: Gary Numan; The Waveteam

Gary Numan singles chronology
"This Is Love" (1986)	"I Can't Stop" (1986)	"New Thing from London Town" (1986)

Music video
- "I Can't Stop" on YouTube

"I Can't Stop" is a song by the English musician Gary Numan, which was released in June 1986 as the second single from his eighth studio album Strange Charm. It was written by Numan, and produced by Numan and the Waveteam. "I Can't Stop" reached No. 27 on the UK singles chart, and remained on the charts for four weeks.

== Music video ==
A music video was filmed to promote the single. The nightclub performance footage was shot at Kadek TV (adjoining Shepperton Studios) and the footage of Numan flying his Harvard plane was filmed at Duxford Aerodrome. Speaking to Sound on Sound in 1986, Numan said: "The flying sequences were done with a minicam attached to the engine cowling of the plane and pointing into the cockpit. I had a trigger in one hand to start the camera shooting."

== Release ==
The first 15,000 copies of both the 7-inch and 12-inch formats came with a free flexi disc promoting Steve Braun and Hohokam, two of Numan's signings on his label Numa.

== Critical reception ==
On its release, Mark Jenkins of Sound on Sound considered the single to be Numan's "best for a long while". In a retrospective review of Strange Charm, Ned Raggett of AllMusic commented: "...even those cuts that derive all too clearly from the Berserker aesthetic, like 'Unknown and Hostile' and 'I Can't Stop,' come across as more unsettled and unexpected, making Strange Charm an imperfect but still noteworthy success." Speaking of Numan's live album The Skin Mechanic (1989), Scott Kahn of MusicPlayers.com wrote in 2006: "Tracks like 'I Can't Stop' and '"New Anger' really came to life with Numan's live band compared to the studio tracks that were marred by rigid and heavily quantized drum beats."

== Track listing ==
7-inch single

1. "I Can't Stop" – 3:23
2. "Faces" – 4:42

12-inch single

1. "I Can't Stop (Extended Mix)" – 6:48
2. "Faces" – 4:42

12-inch single (picture disc)

1. "I Can't Stop (Picture Mix)" – 5:50
2. "Faces" – 4:42

12-inch single (UK promo)

1. "I Can't Stop (Special Club Mix)" – 6:32

== Personnel ==
Musicians

- Gary Numan – vocals, keyboards, instrumentation
- Marc Railton – guitar
- Mike Smith – keyboards
- Linda Taylor – backing vocals
- Rrussell Bell – backing vocals

Production

- Gary Numan – producer
- The Waveteam – producers
- Tim Summerhayes – engineer
- Arun Chakraverty – mastering

Other

- Francis Drake – artwork

== Charts ==
Chart (1986)	Peak position
UK singles chart	27
