= Glad to Know You =

Single by Chaz Jankel

from the album Chasanova
- B-side: "3,000,000 Synths"
- Released: 1981
- Genre: Dance
- Length: 3:30 (7", Chasanova LP); 6:35 (12", Questionnaire LP)
- Label: A&M
- Songwriters: Chaz Jankel; Ian Dury
- Producers: Chaz Jankel; Philip Bagenal; Pete Van Hooke

Chaz Jankel singles chronology
"Questionnaire" (1981)	"Glad to Know You" (1981)	"Without You" (1983)

Official audio
- "Glad to Know You" on YouTube

"Glad to Know You" is a 1981 dance single by Chaz Jankel, the former keyboardist and guitarist for Ian Dury and the Blockheads. After previous single releases "3,000,000 Synths" and "Ai No Corrida", "Glad to Know You" reached number one on the US Billboard Hot Dance Club Play chart, remaining there for seven weeks, and becoming the biggest dance single of 1982. On other US charts, "Glad to Know You", reached number 57 on the US R&B chart. It also reached number 102 on the Bubbling Under Hot 100 chart.

== Cover versions ==
- In 1983 Kitty Grant recorded a cover version of the song for her second studio album of the same name.
- In 2012 the Venezuelan band Los Amigos Invisibles recorded an English-language cover.
