= Chazablanca =

Studio album by Chaz Jankel
- Released: 1983
- Studio: Eastcote Productions (London, England); Compass Point Studios (Nassau, Bahamas)
- Genre: Electronic; synth-pop; funk; blue-eyed soul; reggae
- Length: 35:01
- Label: A&M

Chaz Jankel chronology
Chasanova (1981)	Chazablanca (1983)	Looking at You (1985)

Singles from Chazablanca
- 1. "Without You" Released: 1983; 2. "I Can Get Over It (If You Can Get Over Here)" Released: October 1983

Chazablanca is the third solo studio album by the English singer and multi-instrumentalist Chaz Jankel. It was originally released in 1983, on the label A&M.

== Track listing ==
All tracks are written by Chaz Jankel and Laura Weymouth, except where noted

Side one
No.	Title	Writer(s)	Length
1.	"Theme to Chazablanca (Double Bunk)"	Fishman; Pratt; Black	0:30
2.	"Without You"		4:06
3.	"I Can Get Over It (If You Can Get Over Here)"	Chaz Jankel; Andrew L. Terner; Laura Weymouth; Peter Van Hooke	4:35
4.	"Tell Me"		4:05
5.	"Pretty Thing"		5:25

Side two
No.	Title	Writer(s)	Length
6.	"Whisper"		4:18
7.	"All I Want to Do Is Dance"	Jankel; Ian Dury	4:30
8.	"Davis"	Jankel	4:10
9.	"Thank You Very Much"		3:22
Total length:			35:01

== Personnel ==
Credits are adapted from the album's liner notes.

Musicians

- Chas Jankel – lead and background vocals; guitar; keyboards; percussion
- Jamie Lane – drums; synthesizer
- Kendal Stubbs – bass guitar; percussion
- Neil Richmond – synthesizer programming
- Janie Romer – backing vocals
- Laura Weymouth – backing vocals

Production and artwork

- Philip Bagenal – engineer; mixing
- Steven Stanley – engineer
- Chaz Jankel – mixing
- Mark Sayer-Wade – mixing
- Paul Etienne – mixing
- Aaron Chakraverty – mastering
- Richard Haughton – photography
- Peter Saville – typography

== See also ==
- List of albums released in 1983
