= Chasanova =

Studio album by Chaz Jankel
- Released: 1981
- Recorded: January–July 1981
- Studio: Eastcote Products Recording Studios (London)
- Genre: Electronic; funk; blue-eyed soul; reggae
- Length: 37:34
- Label: A&M
- Producer: Philip Bagenal; Chaz Jankel; Peter Van Hooke

Chaz Jankel chronology
Chas Jankel (1980)	Chasanova (1981)	Chazablanca (1983)

Singles from Chasanova
- 1. "109" Released: 1981; 2. "Questionnaire" Released: 1981; 3. "Glad to Know You" Released: 1981

Chasanova is the second solo studio album by the English singer and multi-instrumentalist Chaz Jankel. It was originally released in 1981, on the label A&M. The album was also released under the title Questionnaire.

The album was recorded over a period of seven months between January and July 1981, in sessions that took place at Eastcote Products Recording Studios, in London. The album featured major lyrical contributions from Ian Dury and musical contributions from two of the Blockheads, bassist Norman Watt-Roy and drummer Charlie Charles and also contained the US dance hit "Glad to Know You", which was one of the tracks with lyrics written by Dury, plus the MTV music video of its title track.

== Track listing ==
All tracks are written by Chaz Jankel and Ian Dury, except where noted.

Side one
No.	Title	Writer(s)	Length
1.	"109"	Chaz Jankel	3:53
2.	"Johnny Funk"		4:57
3.	"Now You're Dancing"		3:38
4.	"Magic of Music"		4:53

Side two
No.	Title	Writer(s)	Length
5.	"Glad to Know You"		3:40
6.	"Boy"	Jankel; Charlie Charles; Norman Watt-Roy	3:53
7.	"Questionnaire"		5:18
8.	"3,000,000 Synths"	Jankel; Philip Bagenal	6:27
Total length:			37:34

== Personnel ==
Credits are adapted from the album's liner notes.

"109"

- Chaz Jankel – lead vocals; piano; Wurlitzer; claptrap; Hammond organ; guitar; Oberheim OB-X; clavinet
- Norman Watt-Roy – bass guitar
- Peter Van Hooke – Linn LM-1 programming
- Laura Weymouth – backing vocals

"Johnny Funk"

- Chaz Jankel – lead vocals; guitars; Oberheim OB-X; Hammond organ; percussion; simulated car crash
- Peter Van Hooke – Linn LM-1 programming; tom-toms; gourd shaker
- Chris Warwick – Oberheim programming micro composer
- Steve Prestage – simulated car crash
- Philip Bagenal – simulated car crash
- Ingrid Mansfield Allman – backing vocals

"Now You're Dancing"

- Chaz Jankel – lead vocals; guitars; piano; Hammond organ; Oberheim OB-X; tom-toms; sound effects other than bells
- Norman Watt-Roy – bass guitar
- Peter Van Hooke – Linn LM-1 programming
- Chris Warwick – Oberheim programming
- Philip Bagenal – bells
- Tessa Webb – backing vocals
- Pepe Lemer – backing vocals
- Jo Collins – backing vocals
- Mick Leeson – backing vocals
- Pete Vale – backing vocals
- Alan Carvell – backing vocals

"Magic of Music"

- Chaz Jankel – lead vocals; Oberheim OB-X; percussion
- Mick Jacques – guitar
- Cecil Roy-Doeman – drums
- Kuma Harada – bass guitar
- Rico Rodriguez – trombone
- Dick Cuthell – trumpet
- Groko – percussion
- Janie Romer – backing vocals
- Laura Weymouth – backing vocals

"Glad to Know You"

- Chaz Jankel – lead vocals; piano; Hammond organ; Oberheim OB-X; bass guitar
- Peter Van Hooke – Linn LM-1 programming; Simmons SDSV
- Mickey Feat – bass guitar
- Tessa Webb – backing vocals
- Pepe Lemer – backing vocals
- Jo Collins – backing vocals
- Ingrid Mansfield Allman – backing vocals

"Boy"

- Chaz Jankel – lead vocals; electric piano; piano; Hammond organ; guitar; claptrap
- Charlie Charles – drums
- Norman Watt-Roy – bass guitar

"Questionnaire"

- Chaz Jankel – lead vocals; piano; electric piano
- Charlie Charles – drums; bongos; timbales solo
- Norman Watt-Roy – bass guitar
- Bill Skeat – tenor saxophone
- Bob Sydor – alto saxophone
- Malcolm Griffith – trombone
- Henry Lowther – trumpet
- Alan Downie – trumpet
- Martin Drover – trumpet
- Peter Van Hooke – agogô
- Juan Carnache – maracas
- John Altman – horn arrangement
- Tessa Webb – chorus vocals
- Jo Collins – chorus vocals
- Pepe Lemer – chorus vocals
- Janie Romer – backing vocals
- Laura Weymouth – backing vocals

"3,000,000 Synths"

- Chaz Jankel – Rhodes piano; Oberheim OB-X
- Chris Warwick – Oberheim programming
- Peter Van Hooke – Linn LM-1 programming
- Philip Bagenal – vocal; dubbing

Production team

- Philip Bagenal – producer; recording; mixing
- Chaz Jankel – producer; mixing
- Peter Van Hooke – producer; mixing
- Steve Prestage – mixing
