= White Noise (Gary Numan album) =

Live album by Gary Numan
- Released: March 1985
- Recorded: December 1984
- Venues: Hammersmith Odeon, London
- Genres: New wave, synthpop
- Length: 93:03
- Label: Numa
- Producer: Gary Numan

Gary Numan chronology
| The Plan (1984) | White Noise (1985) | The Fury (1985) |

Professional ratings
Review scores
| Source | Rating |
|---|---|
| AllMusic | 2.5/5 stars |

White Noise is a double live album by British musician Gary Numan and originally released in 1985. The album was reissued as a double CD in 1998 before a remastered version was released in 2003.

The White Noise album was recorded on 11 December 1984 – the second-last show of Numan's Berserker Tour. It was released in March 1985 and reached number 29 in the UK album chart, outperforming the Berserker (1984) album. White Noise also enjoyed great success in Belgium where it went to number 2. An edited version of the show was released on video as The Berserker Tour in 1985 (subsequent DVD releases featured this shortened version of the show, until the entire concert was released on DVD in early 2008 under the title Cold Warning).

A month after the release of White Noise, four tracks from the album ("Are 'Friends' Electric?", "Berserker", "Cars" and "We Are Glass") were released as The Live EP. It reached #27 on the UK Singles Chart, outperforming the two singles released in 1984 from Numan's Berserker album (the title track, which reached #32, and "My Dying Machine", which reached #66).

== Track listing ==
All tracks written by Gary Numan.

All timings are approximate and will vary slightly with different equipment.

=== 1985 Numa vinyl and MC release (NUMAD/C 1002) ===
Side One

1. "Intro" – 1:58
2. "Berserker" – 5:42
3. "Metal" – 3:32
4. "Me! I Disconnect From You" – 3:21
5. "Remind Me to Smile" – 3:21
6. "Sister Surprise" – 6:11

Side Two

1. "Music for Chameleons" – 6:10
2. "The Iceman Comes" – 4:37
3. "Cold Warning" – 6:09
4. "Down in the Park" – 5:28

Side Three

1. "This Prison Moon" – 3:28
2. "I Die: You Die" – 3:55
3. "My Dying Machine" – 5:42
4. "Cars" – 3:38
5. "We Take Mystery (to Bed)" – 6:31

Side Four

1. "We Are Glass" – 4:57
2. "This is New Love" – 6:21
3. "My Shadow in Vain" – 5:45
4. "Are 'Friends' Electric?" – 6:09
- Side One and Two, Three and Four were combined for the MC release.

=== 1993 Numa CD reissue (NUMACD 1002) ===
Side One and Two, Three and Four were combined for the CD release.

=== 1998 Cleopatra U.S. CD reissue (CLP 0303-2) ===
Same CD track listing as Numa release. Different rear and inner tray artwork and an essay by Dave Thompson.

=== 2003 Eagle Records CD reissue (EDMCD 158) ===
Same CD track listing as Numa release. Different front, rear and inner tray artwork and an essay by Dominic Jones.

=== 2024 Numa Digital Media reissue ===
Part of "The Numa Years" album reissues.

- Numan can be heard breaking into laughter during the show's closing number, "Are 'Friends' Electric?" This was because members of the support act, the music group Hohokam, put on women's clothing and broke onto the stage during the song's performance. One of the pranksters lifted his bra cup and "flashed" Numan, causing Numan to laugh.
