= Tessa Niles =

English singer (born 1961)

- Born: Tessa Margaret Webb; 27 January 1961 (age 65); Ilford, Essex, England
- Occupation: Singer
- Instrument: Vocals
- Years active: 1979–present
- Website: tessaniles.com

Tessa Margaret Niles (née Webb; born 27 January 1961) is an English singer, best known as a backing singer for a wide variety of contemporary artists. She began her professional singing career in 1979.

== Early life and career ==
Niles began her professional singing career, as both a lead and a backing vocalist, in 1979. Throughout her career, Niles has worked with many artists including ABC, Eric Clapton, Kiri Te Kanawa, The Rolling Stones, Annie Lennox, Tears For Fears, Duran Duran, Kylie Minogue, David Bowie, The Police, Take That, Grace Jones, Tina Turner, Paul McCartney, George Harrison, Steve Winwood, Morrissey–Mullen, Snowy White, Tom Jones, Marillion, Fish, Pet Shop Boys, Buddy Guy, B*Witched, Victoria Beckham, Nick Carter, Living in a Box, Cliff Richard, Mike + The Mechanics, Zucchero, Status Quo, Robbie Williams, Bill Sharpe, Gary Numan, Wham!, Andrew Ridgeley, Dusty Springfield, The The, Jimmy Nail, Cher, Cabaret Voltaire, Seal, Liza Minnelli, John Denver and The Escape Club.

In 1985, Niles signed with Rainbow Records as a solo artist. Her debut single, "The President's Girl", was released in November 1985 and was followed in May 1986 with "Tough Girls". Both singles failed to reach the UK Singles Chart and Rainbow Records folded before Niles' album could be released.

In the mid-1980s, Niles was featured the lead vocalist (along with Clive Griffin) for the jazz ensemble Bandzilla, which was led by her then-husband Richard Niles. The band toured and were featured as the resident house band on the Channel 4 television show Don't Miss Wax in 1987. In 1991, the band released their debut album, Blue Movies, again featuring Niles as lead vocalist.

Niles has also voiced and sung on various television commercials for products including Barbie, Levi's, Cadillac, Diet Pepsi, Delta Air Lines, Aquafresh, KFC and DHL.

Her association with Eric Clapton began with his 1986 album August. She toured with him from 1988 to 1992, again in October 1997, and again on his 1999 tour of Japan. She sang backing vocals during the George Harrison/Eric Clapton tour of Japan in 1991 and for Clapton's Unplugged concert in 1992. Niles also appeared at Clapton's Crossroads Benefit Concert on 30 June 1999 and the Concert for George on 29 November 2002.

Niles performed vocals during one version of the song "All I Want For Christmas Is You" for the 2003 film Love Actually.

Niles also performed at Live Aid at Wembley Stadium in 1985, where she provided backing vocals for David Bowie (who introduced her as "Theresa" in the prelude to "Heroes"). On 16 & 17 June 1989 she performed vocals at Cliff Richard's gigs: From a Distance: The Event recorded at Wembley Stadium. In 1993, she featured in the Cliff Richard´s studio album The Album.

== Personal life ==
She is the former wife of American musician Richard Niles, whom she married in 1982. Later she married Eduardo Chivambo Mondlane Jr., the son of Eduardo Mondlane. In 1998, Niles gave birth to twins.

== Career highlights ==
Date	Album	Artist	Contribution
1981	Chasanova	Chas Jankel	Backing vocals
1982	The Lexicon of Love	ABC	Additional vocals
1983	It's About Time	Morrissey–Mullen	Author, vocals
1983	Synchronicity	The Police	Backing vocals
1984	Private Dancer	Tina Turner	Backing vocals
1984	Berserker	Gary Numan	Backing vocals
1984	Intolerance	Tik & Tok	Backing vocals
1985	Famous People	Bill Sharpe	Lead and backing vocals
1985	The Explorers	The Explorers	Backing vocals
1985	Heaven Knows	Jaki Graham	Backing vocals
1985	Looking at You	Chaz Jankel	Backing vocals
1985	Out of the Darkest Night	Barbara Pennington	Backing vocals
1985	Paul Hardcastle	Paul Hardcastle	Backing vocals
1985	Slave to the Rhythm	Grace Jones	Backing vocals
1985	The Fury	Gary Numan	Backing vocals
1986	August	Eric Clapton	Backing vocals
1986	Baby the Stars Shine Bright	Everything But The Girl	Backing vocals
1986	Break Every Rule	Tina Turner	Backing vocals
1986	Breaking Away	Jaki Graham	Backing vocals
1986	Count Three & Pray	Berlin	Backing vocals
1986	Dancing in My Sleep	Dave Adams	Backing vocals
1986	Infected	The The	Backing vocals
1986	Loz Netto	Loz Netto	Backing vocals
1986	Notorious	Duran Duran	Backing vocals
1986	Salamandra	Miguel Bosé	Backing vocals
1986	Strange Charm	Gary Numan	Backing vocals
1987	Alphabet City	ABC	Backing vocals
1987	American English	Wax	Backing vocals
1987	Clutching at Straws	Marillion	Backing vocals
1987	First (The Sound of Music)	Then Jerico	Backing vocals
1987	Fortune and Men's Eyes	Jennifer Hall	Backing vocals
1987	Living in a Box	Living in a Box	Backing vocals
1987	Saint Julian	Julian Cope	Backing vocals
1987	She Loves Me Not	Alan Rankine	Backing vocals
1987	Pop Goes the World	Men Without Hats	Backing vocals
1987	Walk on Fire	Silent Running	Backing vocals
1988	Big Thing	Duran Duran	Backing vocals
1988	Fur	Jane Wiedlin	Backing vocals
1988	Introspective	Pet Shop Boys	Backing vocals
1988	Metal Rhythm	Gary Numan	Backing vocals
1988	Roll With It	Steve Winwood	Backing vocals
1988	Wild Wild West	The Escape Club	Backing vocals
1988	Step By Step	Clive Griffin	Backing vocals
1988	The Corporate World	Gail Ann Dorsey	Backing vocals
1989	Anderson Bruford Wakeman Howe	Anderson Bruford Wakeman Howe	Backing vocals
1989	Automatic	Sharpe + Numan	Backing vocals
1989	Foreign Affair	Tina Turner	Backing vocals
1989	Gatecrashing	Living in a Box	Backing vocals
1989	Results	Liza Minnelli	Backing vocals
1989	Steel Wheels	The Rolling Stones	Backing vocals
1989	The Seeds of Love	Tears for Fears	Backing vocals
1989	The Golden Mile	Workshy	Backing vocals
1989	Journeyman	Eric Clapton	Backing vocals
1989	Passion	Shirley Lewis	Author
1990	1234	Propaganda	Backing vocals
1990	Circle of One	Oleta Adams	Backing vocals
1990	Everybody Knows	Sonia Evans	Backing vocals
1990	In ogni senso	Eros Ramazzotti	Backing vocals
1990	Liberty	Duran Duran	Backing vocals
1990	Reputation	Dusty Springfield	Backing vocals
1990	Son of Albert	Andrew Ridgeley	Backing vocals
1990	From a Distance: The Event	Cliff Richard	Backing vocals
1990	Vigil in a Wilderness of Mirrors	Fish	Backing vocals
1991	24 Nights	Eric Clapton	Backing vocals
1991	Blue Movies	Bandzilla	Lead vocals (with Clive Griffin)
1991	Outland	Gary Numan	Backing vocals
1991	24 Nights(Reprise Records, 1991)	Eric Clapton	Backing vocals
1991	Changing Faces	Bros	Backing vocals
1991	Flashpoint	The Rolling Stones	Backing vocals
1991	Live in Japan	George Harrison	Backing vocals
1992	All the Fool's in Town	Sweet Addiction	Backing vocals
1992	Great Expectations	Tasmin Archer	Backing vocals
1992	Unplugged	Eric Clapton	Backing vocals
1992	And Still I Rise	Alison Limerick	Backing vocals
1992	Dream Juice	Efua	Backing vocals
1992	In the Running	Howard Jones	Backing vocals
1992	Miserere	Zucchero	Backing vocals
1992	The Curse of the Higsons	The Higsons	Backing vocals
1993	Breakaway	Kim Appleby	Backing vocals
1993	Clive Griffin	Clive Griffin	Backing vocals
1993	The Album	Cliff Richard	Backing vocals
1993	The Wedding Album	Duran Duran	Backing vocals
1993	Beverley Craven	Beverley Craven	Backing vocals
1993	Very	Pet Shop Boys	Backing vocals
1993	Painted Desert Serenade	Joshua Kadison	Backing vocals
1994	Dog Man Star	Suede	Backing vocals
1994	Sean Maguire	Sean Maguire	Backing vocals
1994	The Lead and How to Swing It	Tom Jones	Backing vocals
1995	Arabesque	Mike Batt	Backing vocals
1995	Big River	Jimmy Nail	Backing vocals
1995	Hold On	Jaki Graham	Backing vocals
1995	Live!	The Police	Backing vocals
1995	Nobody Else	Take That	Backing vocals
1995	Thank You	Duran Duran	Backing vocals
1996	Don't Stop	Status Quo	Backing vocals
1996	The View from the Hill	Justin Hayward	Backing vocals
1996	Wildest Dreams	Tina Turner	Backing vocals
1997	Across from Midnight	Joe Cocker	Backing vocals
1997	Salvation	Alphaville	Backing vocals
1998	11 Maneras De Ponerse Un Sombrero	Miguel Bosé	Backing vocals
1998	Eden	Sarah Brightman	Backing vocals
1998	Marshall & Alexander	Marshall & Alexander	Backing vocals
1998	Awake and Breathe	B*Witched	Backing vocals
1999	Nightlife	Pet Shop Boys	Backing vocals
1999	Prince's Trust Rock Gala	Various (Mark Knopfler, Elton John, Eric Clapton)	Backing vocals
2000	Here and Now	Worlds Apart	Backing vocals
2000	Sing When You're Winning	Robbie Williams	Backing vocals
2001	Closer to Heaven	Pet Shop Boys & Jonathan Harvey	Backing vocals
2001	White Lilies Island	Natalie Imbruglia	Backing vocals
2002	Escapology	Robbie Williams	Backing vocals
2002	Concert for George	Various (Eric Clapton)	Backing vocals
2003	What My Heart Wants to Say	Gareth Gates	Backing vocals
2003	Live at Knebworth – Live Summer 2003	Robbie Williams	Backing vocals
2003	Pop Art	Pet Shop Boys	Backing vocals
2003	Seven Years - Ten Weeks	David Sneddon	Backing vocals
2003	Seal IV	Seal	Backing vocals
2004	Allow Us to Be Frank	Westlife	Backing vocals
2004	Astronaut	Duran Duran	Backing vocals
2004	A Concert For The Prince's Trust – Live at Wembley Arena London 2004	Various (Trevor Horn)	Backing vocals
2018	Change Your Mind (Live)	Bill Sharpe	Lead vocals
