= Bill Sharpe (musician) =

British musician (born 1952)

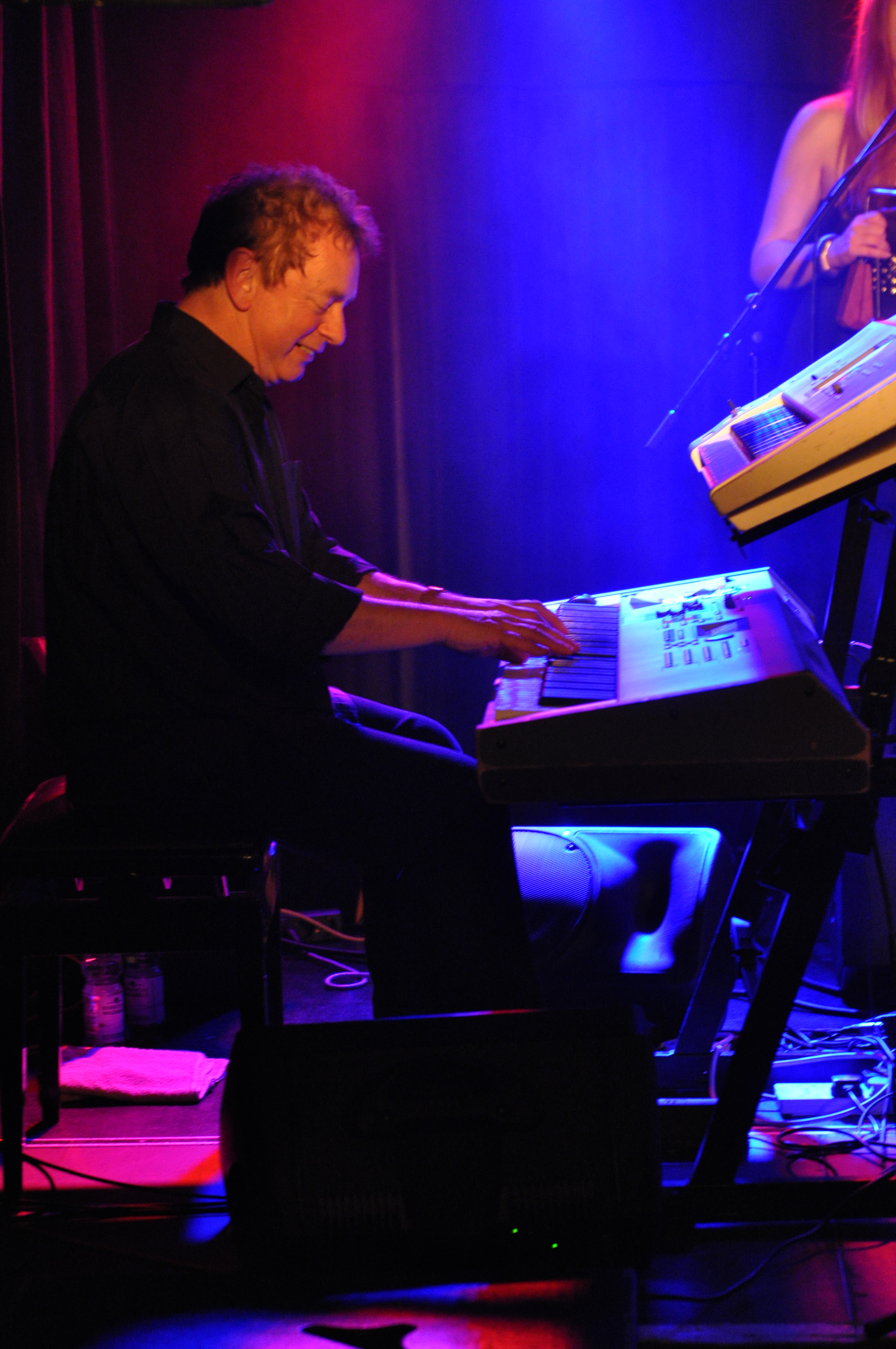
- Sharpe performing with Shakatak in Wuppertal, Germany, 2014

Background information
- Birth name: William Jeffrey Revell Sharpe
- Born: 19 November 1952 (age 72); Bishop's Stortford, Hertfordshire, England
- Genres: Pop; jazz funk
- Occupation: Musician
- Instrument: Keyboards
- Years active: 1980s–present

Bill Sharpe (born William Jeffrey Revell Sharpe; 19 November 1952) is a British musician, who has worked as a member of Shakatak, as a solo artist, and with others, such as Gary Numan and Don Grusin.

== Life and career ==
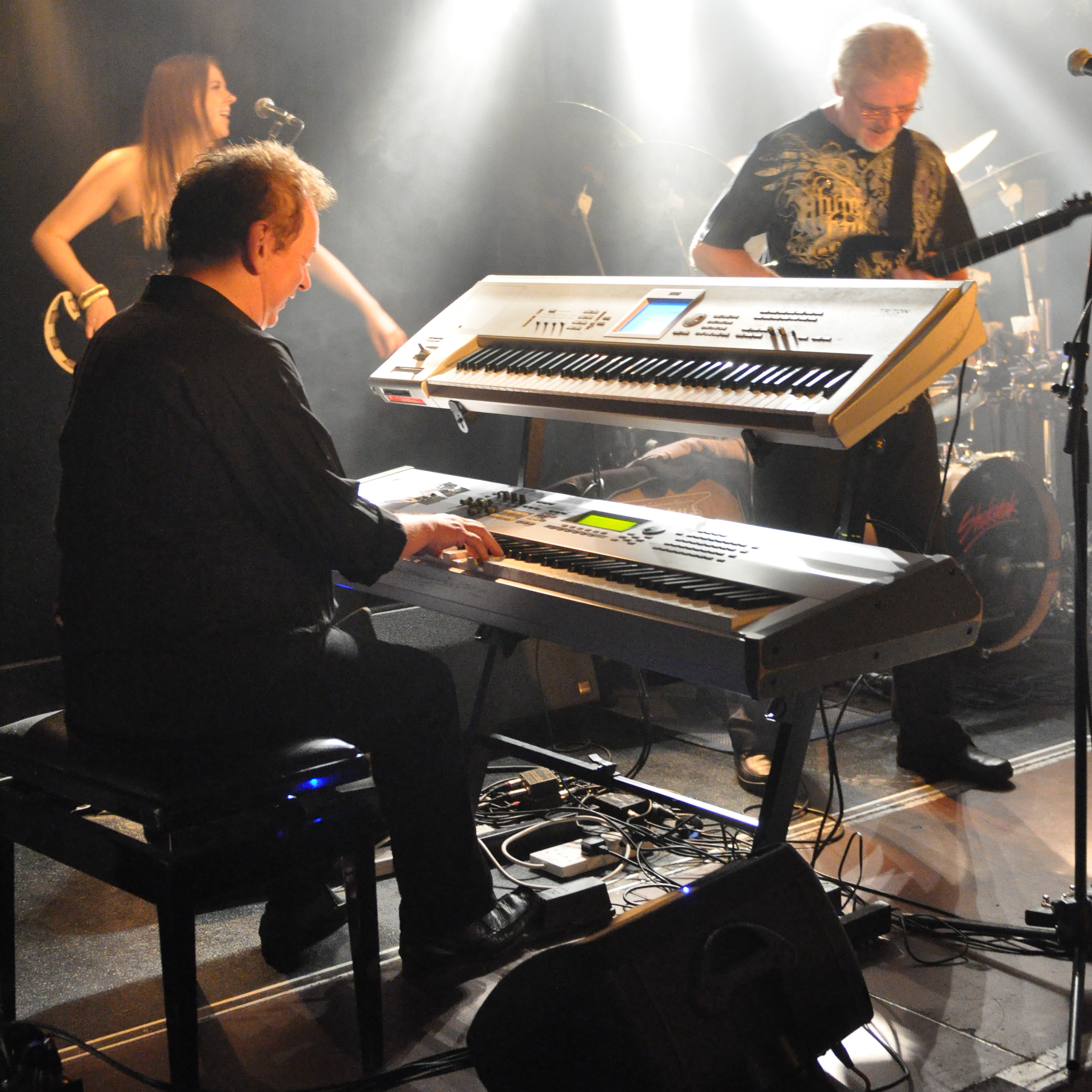
Sharpe as Member of Shakatak in Wuppertal, Germany (2014)

Sharpe was educated at Bishop's Stortford College. From there he studied music at Birmingham University where he gained an honours degree.

Sharpe had classical tuition on piano from an early age. As a teenager, his main interest was piano music from the romantic era, but eventually he found an interest in jazz and rock music. He joined several jazz rock bands as a keyboard player around his native Bishop's Stortford, one of the most successful ones featuring Trevor Horn on bass guitar.

He worked for the BBC as a tape op and sound engineer at the Maida Vale Studios for six years, engineering sessions for the John Peel and Kid Jensen shows. During this time, in the early 1980s, he was a founding member of the group Shakatak. After Shakatak had achieved a handful of hit singles he became a full time musician.

=== Shakatak ===
Shakatak was founded in 1980. Following three singles that reached or stalled just outside the top 50 on the UK singles chart, they had their first major success with "Easier Said Than Done", which reached no. 12 on the singles chart in late 1981. It was followed by the UK top 10 hit "Night Birds", peaking at no. 9 in April 1982, and the album of the same title, which reached no. 4 on the albums chart during a 28-week chart stay. In 1984, they scored their second UK top 10 hit with the single "Down on the Street". In total, Shakatak achieved 14 singles and 6 albums on the UK top 75 in the 1980s. The band also gained a huge popularity in Japan, releasing a number of albums exclusive for the Japanese market, such as the 1983 double album Shakatak – Live in Japan!.

=== Sharpe & Numan and solo album ===
In 1985, he teamed with Gary Numan, billed as Sharpe & Numan. The duo scored a British top 20 hit with the single "Change Your Mind". That same year, Sharpe released his debut solo album, Famous People, which included the duet with Numan. Other vocalists featured on the album include then-frequent Numan backing singer Tessa Niles, who sang the title track. It was released as the second single from the album, but did not chart.

A follow-up Sharpe & Numan single, "New Thing from London Town", was featured on Numan's 1986 album Strange Charm. Two years later, Sharpe & Numan returned with the single "No More Lies", and in early 1989 the duo released a full album together, Automatic. A second single, "I'm on Automatic", was a modest UK Top 40 hit. "Change Your Mind" was also included on that album.

=== Later career ===
In 1999, he recorded his second solo album, State of the Heart in Los Angeles, co-produced by Don Grusin. This featured many artists, including Jeffrey Osborne and Gerald Albright. He continued to work with Don Grusin on a joint project called Geography, released in 2007. Sharpe's second collaboration with Grusin, Trans Atlantica, was released on 3 September 2012 through the London label, Secret Records, and included their first album Geography as a special 2-CD package. In recent years, he has worked with Jah Wobble on the album Kingdom of Fitzrovia; Roberto Tola on the album Bein' Green and "Fast" Eddie Clarke on his album, Make My Day.

Sharpe continues to tour and record with Shakatak.

== Discography ==
Solo

- Famous People (1985) Polydor Ltd POLHC 20
- State of the Heart (1999)
- Close to My Heart: Shakatak Hits on Solo Piano (2006)
- Trans Atlántica (2012, with Don Grusin)
- Kingdom of Fitzrovia (2013, with Jah Wobble)
- Famous People Live (recorded 2016, released 2018)

Sharpe & Numan

- "Change Your Mind" (1985, single, UK #17)
- "New Thing from London Town" – (1986, single, UK #52)
- "No More Lies" – (1988, single, UK #34)
- "I'm on Automatic" – (1989, single, UK #44)
- Automatic (1989, UK #59)

As featured artist

- Make My Day: Back to Blues – "Fast" Eddie Clarke (2014)
- Bein' Green – Roberto Tola (2017)
