= In Concert: A Benefit for the Crossroads Centre at Antigua =

- Directed by: Joel Gallen
- Produced by: Joel Gallen
- Starring: Eric Clapton
- Cinematography: Kevin Mazur
- Edited by: Bill DeRonde
- Distributed by: Warner Bros. Records
- Release date: 26 October 1999
- Running time: 108:00 minutes
- Country: United Kingdom
- Language: English

In Concert: A Benefit for the Crossroads Centre at Antigua is a live concert film featuring performances by the British blues musician Eric Clapton and invited friends, such as David Sanborn, Sheryl Crow, Mary J. Blige and Bob Dylan. The DVD and VHS formats were released on 26 October 1999 under license of Warner Bros. Records. The concert tickets revenue was donated to the Crossroads Centre Foundation. It was the first Crossroads Guitar Festival, although titled differently at the time. The release reached various national charts and sold more than 225,000 copies worldwide.

== Chart performance ==
In Australia, the video album release was awarded a Platinum disc for shipments over 15,000 DVDs in 2005 by the Australian Recording Industry Association. In Concert: A Benefit for the Crossroads Centre at Antigua reached position two on the official music DVD chart compiled by the Associação Brasileira dos Produtores de Discos in Brazil and was certified with a Gold disc commemorating the sale of more than 25,000 copies in the country. In Denmark, the concert film reached number five on the Hitlisten Top 10 music video albums chart and was awarded a Gold status for DVD and VHS shipments of 25,000. The 1999 release peaked at number one on the Portuguese music video chart, selling more than 16,000 copies while on charting. It was certified double Platinum by the Associação Fonográfica Portuguesa in January 2000. In Sweden, In Concert: A Benefit for the Crossroads Centre at Antigua reached number nine on the Sverigetopplistan-chart. It was certified with a Gold disc on 28 October 1999 – two days after its release and quickly achieved a Platinum award on 29 October the same year. In the United Kingdom and the United States, the release was awarded a Gold and Platinum presentation by the British Phonographic Industry and the Recording Industry Association of America for shipments of respectively 25,000 and 100,000 units. In Portugal and Brazil, the video reached the year-end music DVD charts of 2000, where they placed themselves on rankings thirty-one and forty-five.

== Personnel ==
Musicians and special guests

- Eric Clapton – Guitar · Lead vocals
- David Sanborn – Saxophone
- Mary J. Blige – Lead vocals
- Sheryl Crow – Lead vocals · Bass guitar
- Bob Dylan – Guitar · Lead vocals
- Andy Fairweather Low – Rhythm guitar · vocals
- Nathan East – Bass guitar · vocals
- Steve Gadd – Drums
- Tim Carmon – Keyboards · Hammond Organ
- Dave Delhomme – Keyboards · Hammond Organ
- Tessa Niles – Background vocals
- Katie Kissoon – Background vocals

Concert production team

- J. Shannon Curran – Director of production
- Rick Austin – Producer of show opening
- John Beug – Executive producer
- Eric Clapton – Executive producer
- Joel Gallen – Out-producer
- Rose-Ellen Iannucci – Line-producer
- Wayne Isaak – Executive producer for VH1
- Robert F. Katz – Executive producer for VH1
- Jay Karas – Coordinating producer
- John Sykes – Executive producer
- Lili Fini Zanuck – Executive producer
- Stephen 'Scooter' Weintraub – Executive producer

Other selected involvements

- John Harris – Sound mix
- Ted Hall – Post-production sound mix
- Bryan Leskowicz – Sound assistant
- Allen Branton – Lighting designer
- Victor Fable – Lighting director
- Nevis Cameron – Official photography
- Virginia Lohle – Official photography
- Gary Lanvy – Stage set
- Albert Strittmatter – Show power
- Dan Denitto – Dolly grip
- Matty Randazzo – Video controller
- John Meiklejohn – Camera operator

== Critical reception ==
Professional ratings
Review scores
Source	Rating
João Santos	5/5 stars
AllMusic	3/5 stars
CD Universe	4.5/5 stars

The Portuguese music journalist João Santos calls the video album "a great picture with great sound" for his review in the daily newspaper Público. He also notes "Eric Clapton having a fantastic performing ability", which is presented "in full circle" in the music movie. Santos also likes the "various special guests either singing or playing" on In Concert: A Benefit for the Crossroads Centre at Antigua. He rated the release with five out of five stars. AllMusic critic Heather Phares calls the track listing "a somewhat routine selection of Clapton's hits" and adds that "his collaborations with the aforementioned guests add some interesting twists". For his review, Phares notes "the unusual combination of Blige and Clapton [...] works surprisingly well". Coming to the conclusion, the AllMusic critic thinks the release "is not Clapton's most inspired concert video and the disc offers little in the way of extra features, [but] still may please his hardcore fans". Phares awards the concert film three out of five possible stars. Critics from the music website Guitar Nine liked the Dolby Digital surround sound. Music journalists from Examiner.com called the release "great".

== Chart positions ==
=== Weekly charts ===
Chart (1999–2002)	Peak position
Brazilian Music DVD (ABPD)	2
Danish Music DVD (Hitlisten)	5
Portuguese Music DVD (AFP)	1
Swedish Music DVD (Sverigetopplistan)	9

=== Year-end charts ===
Chart (2000)	Position
Brazilian Music DVD (ABPD)	45
Portuguese Music DVD (AFP)	31

== Certifications ==
Region	Certification	Certified units/sales
Australia (ARIA)	Platinum	15,000^{^}
Brazil (Pro-Música Brasil)	Gold	25,000^{*}
Denmark (IFPI Danmark)	Gold	25,000^{^}
Portugal (AFP)	2× Platinum	16,000^{^}
Sweden (GLF)	Platinum	20,000^{^}
United Kingdom (BPI)	Gold	25,000^{*}
United States (RIAA)	Platinum	100,000^{^}
^{*} Sales figures based on certification alone.^{^} Shipments figures based on certification alone.
