= Metal Rhythm =

Studio album by Gary Numan
- Released: 26 September 1988
- Recorded: Late 1987–mid 1988
- Genre: Electronic; pop rock; funk; synth-pop; industrial rock
- Length: 39:41
- Label: I.R.S.; Illegal
- Producer: Gary Numan

Gary Numan chronology
Strange Charm (1986)	Metal Rhythm (1988)	Automatic (1989)

Alternative Cover
- US Release cover.

Singles from New Anger
- 1. "New Anger" Released: 19 September 1988; 2. "America" Released: 21 November 1988

Professional ratings
Review scores
Source	Rating
AllMusic	3/5 stars

Metal Rhythm is the ninth solo studio album by the English musician Gary Numan, released in September 1988 by I.R.S. Records.

== Overview ==
Gary Numan's previous three studio albums had been released on his own record label, Numa Records. The disappointing sales of those albums led to Numan closing down the label and signing a recording contract with I.R.S. Records. Most of the album had been recorded before Numan signed with the label. I.R.S. therefore had little opportunity to make changes to the recorded material, but the label was still able to exert influence on the album's release. Numan wanted to call the album Cold Metal Rhythm after its song of the same name, but I.R.S. believed that the shortened title sounded less negative and more commercial.

Musically, Metal Rhythm represented a move by Numan into a more commercial sound, although it preserved continuity with Numan's previous studio albums. Metal Rhythm made liberal use of female backing vocals, which Numan had incorporated into his four previous albums; also, the futuristic funk that characterised Numan's previous albums remained on Metal Rhythm, but the programmed beats, hustling vocals and rock power chords gave the album an edgier, more psyched-up vibe. The album's sense of aggression is present lyrically as well as musically. On the liner notes for the album's 1999 re-release, Steve Malins writes that "like Trent Reznor's NIN debut, the persona projected on Metal Rhythm is restless, emotionally unstable, scathing about human frailties and flaws, self loathing about his own." In the songs "This Is Emotion", "New Anger" and "Devious", Numan lashes out at the emotional desolation and manipulative personalities he had encountered throughout his career, and "Respect" is rumoured to be about Numan's falling out with Hohokam, a band signed to Numa Records and Numan's support act during the 1984 Berserker tour. Numan himself remarked:

I must admit that one of my reasons for wanting to get back into the charts was revenge. I wanted to get back at everyone who had put the knife in. In fact the Metal Rhythm album is one of the most aggressive of my career. I poured out my nerves and frustration into my music, making it very psyched-up, raw and uncompromising.

Metal Rhythm was released in September 1988 and although its edgy, industrial-funk sound met with favour from fans and some positive reviews in the UK music press, it sold poorly. The album charted at No. 48, while its singles, "New Anger" and "America", charted at No. 46 and No. 49 respectively. Numan later recalled:

I think IRS expected to have success with me straight away. I remember the managing director of the UK division, Steve Tannet, leaping around his office when he played the first single from the album, "New Anger". I was happy about his enthusiasm but a little embarrassed at the sight of such a chubby man dancing around. IRS had chosen the title track after listening to the finished album and felt it particularly strong from the very beginning. Steve was full of it, the song was going to be a big hit, it would do this, that and the other. He forgot about that in October when it reached 46 in the UK charts. We were up in his office a few weeks after the release and he said, 'Of course, you chose the wrong single there, we never wanted that one at all.' 'Hello, 'I thought, 'Earth calling Tannet.' He flatly denied that he'd chosen the single and danced around his office. It was record company bullshit supreme.

For its American release, and against Numan's wishes, the record label changed the album's title to New Anger, changed the artwork colour shade from black to blue, remixed several of its tracks and even replaced two tracks ("Hunger" and "Young Heart") with tracks originally recorded for Numan's sixth solo studio album Berserker (1984).

Numan released two more albums with I.R.S. – The Skin Mechanic (1989), a live album from the Metal Rhythm tour, and the studio album Outland (1991) – before quitting the label and reactivating Numa Records.

Numan supported Metal Rhythm with an 18-date UK live tour (September–October 1988) from which the live album The Skin Mechanic was released in 1989. Culled from two shows at the Dominion Theatre, London in September 1988, The Skin Mechanic charted at UK No. 55, and was followed by a 1990 video release of the tour.

== Track listing ==
All tracks written by Gary Numan.

All timings are approximate and will vary slightly with different equipment.

=== 1988 Illegal Records UK CD release (ILPCD035) ===
1. "This Is Emotion" – 4:05
2. "Hunger" – 4:30
3. "New Anger" – 3:22
4. "Devious" – 4:19
5. "America" – 3:32
6. "Voix" – 5:00
7. "Respect" – 4:10
8. "Young Heart" – 5:04
9. "Cold Metal Rhythm" – 4:28
10. "Don't Call My Name" – 3:42

=== 1999 EMI UK CD reissue (7243 5 22133 2 0) ===
1. "This Is Emotion" – 4:05
2. "Hunger" – 4:30
3. "New Anger" – 3:22
4. "Devious" – 4:19
5. "America" – 3:32
6. "Voix" – 5:00
7. "Respect" – 4:10
8. "Young Heart" – 5:04
9. "Cold Metal Rhythm" – 4:28
10. "Don't Call My Name" – 3:42
11. "I Don't Believe" – 3:22
12. "Children" – 3:10
13. "My Dying Machine" (William Orbit Mix) – 6:33
14. "Devious" (Andy Piercy Mix) – 3:37
15. "America" (Remix) – 2:50

=== 1989 IRS US CD release as New Anger (IRSD-82005) ===
1. "Devious" (Andy Piercy Mix) – 3:37
2. "America" – 3:32
3. "Cold Metal Rhythm" – 4:28
4. "This Is Emotion" – 4:05
5. "Don't Call My Name" – 3:42
6. "Voix" – 5:00
7. "Respect" – 4:10
8. "New Anger" – 3:22 (Listed as 'remixed by Andy Piercy' but is identical to the UK version.)
9. "My Dying Machine" (William Orbit Mix) – 6:33
10. "A Child with the Ghost" – 4:04
- "A Child with the Ghost" was originally released on Numan's sixth solo studio album Berserker (1984), as was the original version of "My Dying Machine"
- "America (Remix)" was released as a single on both vinyl and CD. The CD version contains three bonus live tracks – "Respect" and "New Anger" being recorded on the Metal Rhythm tour at the Dominion Theatre, London on 28 September 1988 and "Call Out the Dogs" recorded on the Exhibition tour at the Hammersmith Odeon in London on 25 September 1987.

== Personnel ==
Adapted from the Metal Rhythm liner notes.

Musicians

- Gary Numan – vocals; keyboards; drum machine programming
- Keith Beauvais – guitar
- Pete Haycock – guitar; slide guitar
- Rrussell Bell – guitar
- Ian Herron – percussion
- Mike Smith – keyboards
- Andy Coughlan – bass
- Martin Elliott – bass
- Dick Morrissey – saxophone
- Chris Payne – violin
- Tessa Niles – backing vocals
