= Like a Refugee (I Won't Cry) =

Single by Numan & Dadadang
- Released: 1994
- Genre: Pop rock
- Length: 3:54
- Label: The Record Label
- Songwriter(s): Hugh Nicholson
- Producer(s): Hugh Nicholson; David Nicholson

Gary Numan singles chronology
"Cars (1993 remix)" (1993)	"Like a Refugee (I Won't Cry)" (1994)	"A Question of Faith" (1994)

"Like a Refugee (I Won't Cry)" is a song by English singer and musician Gary Numan, which was released in 1994 as a non-album single under the name "Numan & Dadadang". It was written by Hugh Nicholson, and produced by Hugh and David Nicholson. "Like a Refugee (I Won't Cry)" reached No. 78 in the UK Singles Chart in May 1994.

== Background ==
Hugh Nicholson wrote "Like a Refugee (I Won't Cry)" in 1993 about the plight of young Africans seeking refuge in Europe. Nicholson recalled in 2015, "I was moved to write the song in response to an article detailing the harrowing journey of young African stowaways seeking shelter in Europe from fear, hunger, and persecution."

After Nicholson recorded a demo of the song, he approached Numan with the opportunity of providing his own vocals on the track. Nicholson and his brother David had previously collaborated with Numan on three singles for their music project Radio Heart in 1987. Numan listened to the demo version in his dressing room prior to his concert at Birmingham Town Hall on 27 October 1993. He then recorded his vocals the following day in London over the existing backing track.

== Release ==
"Like a Refugee" was later included on the 1999 Nicholson/Numan compilation album 1987-1994, as well as the 2018 Demon Music Group re-release of the 1988 Radio Heart album. Nicholson's demo version, which was originally given the title "Over on the Other Side", first appeared on 1987-1994. It was also included on Nicholson's 2011 solo album Loving You.

== Music video ==
The song's music video was filmed in Bergamo, Italy, and featured the Italian percussionists Dadadang. In his 2020 autobiography, Numan recalled, "They dressed like robots and marched through the streets of Italy in costumes that glowed in the dark. It really was quite spectacular." The video was directed by Vittorio Panza.

== Critical reception ==
Alan Jones of Music Week described "Like a Refugee" as "an unusually edifying single from Numan and Italian percussionists Dadadang" which "benefits greatly from the use of thunder drums and uilleann pipes, which help give it an ethnic, folky flavour". He added, "It is certainly Numan's best shot at the chart for some time". In a 2017 beginner's guide to Numan, Chi Ming Lai of The Electricity Club considered the song to be a "rousing and melodic number" which "would have actually made a good Eurovision entry".

== Track listing ==
Cassette single

1. "Like a Refugee (I Won't Cry)" (Radio Version) – 3:54
2. "Like a Refugee (I Won't Cry)" (Acoustic Version) – 4:33

12" single

1. "Like a Refugee (I Won't Cry)" (Pandemonium Mix) – 4:37
2. "Like a Refugee (I Won't Cry)" (Radio Mix) – 3:54
3. "Like a Refugee (I Won't Cry)" (Instrumental) – 5:25

CD single

1. "Like a Refugee (I Won't Cry)" (Radio Version) – 3:54
2. "Like a Refugee (I Won't Cry)" (Extended Version) – 5:35
3. "Like a Refugee (I Won't Cry)" (Acoustic Version) – 4:33

CD single (UK CD #2)

1. "Like a Refugee (I Won't Cry)" (Radio Mix) – 3:54
2. "Like a Refugee (I Won't Cry)" (Pandemonium Mix) – 4:37
3. "Like a Refugee (I Won't Cry)" (Instrumental Mix) – 3:55
4. "Machine and Soul" (Live Version) – 6:20

== Personnel ==
Production

- Hugh Nicholson, David Nicholson – producers
- Danton Supple – engineer
- Lee Phillips – second engineer
- Ian MacCabe – art direction

== Charts ==
Chart (1994)	Peak position
UK Singles (OCC)	78
