= Exhibition (album) =

1987 compilation album

Compilation album by Gary Numan / Tubeway Army
- Released: 14 September 1987
- Genre: New wave, electronic, synthpop
- Length: 101:51 LP and Cassette; 145:25 CD
- Label: Beggars Banquet Records; BEGA 88 (CD)
- Producer: Gary Numan, Dramatis, Simon Heywood, Kenny Denton

Gary Numan / Tubeway Army chronology
Strange Charm (1986)	Exhibition (1987)	Radio Heart (1987)

Singles from Exhibition
- 1. "Cars (E Reg Model)" Released: 7 September 1987

Professional ratings
Review scores
Source	Rating
Smash Hits	6/10

Exhibition (1987) is a double disc compilation album of Gary Numan's hits and selected other tracks released on the Beggars Banquet Records label. The songs cover Numan's career from 1978 (with Tubeway Army) to 1983.

It was released by Beggars Banquet Records in September 1987 as an LP, cassette and, with an expanded track listing, double CD.

The album peaked at #43 in the UK Album Chart. A remix of Numan's 1979 single "Cars", entitled "Cars ('E' Reg Model)" was released to promote the album and peaked at #16.
