= Looking at You (album) =

Studio album by Chaz Jankel
- Released: 1985
- Genre: Electronic; pop rock; synthpop
- Length: 48:33
- Label: A&M
- Producer: Zeus B. Held; Philip Bagenal; Chaz Jankel

Chaz Jankel chronology
Chazablanca (1983)	Looking at You (1985)	Out of the Blue (2001)

Singles from Looking at You
- 1. "Number One" Released: 1985; 2. "Looking at You" Released: 1985

Looking at You is the fourth solo studio album by the English singer and multi-instrumentalist Chaz Jankel. It was originally released in 1985, on the label A&M. It was his last solo album until 2001's Out of the Blue, as well as his last to be released on A&M, after Jerry Moss, the recording executive of A&M, rejected the release of his fifth album and terminated his recording career with the label in the same year.

The album featured some lyrical contributions from Ian Dury and musical contributions from two of the Blockheads, bass player Norman Watt-Roy and drummer Charlie Charles.

The track "Number One" was featured in the 1985 movie Real Genius starring Val Kilmer.

== Track listing ==
All tracks are written by Chaz Jankel, except where noted

Side one
No.	Title	Writer(s)	Length
1.	"Hard Music"	Andy Heath; Chaz Jankel	5:40
2.	"Tonight's Our Night"		4:11
3.	"Rhythm in My Life"		4:08
4.	"Little Eva"	Jankel; Ian Dury	5:00
5.	"Eastern Light"	Jankel; Kenny Young	4:15

Side two
No.	Title	Writer(s)	Length
6.	"Number One"	Jankel; Dury; Norman Watt-Roy	7:18
7.	"Tell Me, Tell Me"		4:14
8.	"Looking at You"		5:28
9.	"The Boy on the Bridge"	Jankel; Dury	4:16
10.	"Love Rhythms"	Jankel; Young; Watt-Roy	4:03
Total length:			48:33

== Personnel ==
Credits are adapted from the album's liner notes.

- Chaz Jankel – lead vocals; guitar; keyboards; drum machine programming; percussion
- Robbie Taylor – keyboards; drum machine programming
- Charlie Charles – drums; additional percussion
- Norman Watt-Roy – bass guitar
- Zeus B. Held – Fairlight CMI programming
- Steve Rance – Fairlight CMI programming
- Paul Samuelson – Fairlight CMI programming
- Derek Watkins – trumpet; horn arrangements
- Caroline Lavelle – cello; string arrangements
- Peter Van Hooke – Simmons tom fills
- Jeff Daly – saxophone
- Andy Macintosh – saxophone
- Tim Sanders – saxophone
- Johnny Rees – violin
- Liz Layton – violin
- Andy Brown – viola
- Martin Ditcham – Latin percussion
- Chris Taylor – Latin percussion
- Geraldo – Latin percussion
- Tessa Niles – backing vocals
- Kenny Young – backing vocals
- Germaine Johnson – backing vocals
- Terry Roberts – backing vocals

Production team

- Zeus B. Held – producer
- Philip Bagenal – producer; engineer; editing
- Chaz Jankel – producer
- Keiron De Lancey-Wheeler – assistant engineer
- Bob Carbone – mastering
- Aaron Chuckraverty – mastering
- Michael Ross – art direction
- Richard Haughton – photography
- Helen Backhouse – design
- Jeremy Williams – design

== See also ==
- List of albums released in 1985
