= Six Strings Down =

Song by Jimmie Vaughan

from the album Strange Pleasure
- Released: 1994
- Recorded: 1994
- Genre: Blues, Blues rock
- Length: 4:25
- Label: Epic
- Songwriters: Eric Kolb; Aaron Neville; Charmaine Neville; Cyril Neville; Kelsey Smith; Jimmie Vaughan
- Producer: Nile Rodgers

"Six Strings Down" is a blues song recorded by Jimmie Vaughan in 1994. It is a tribute to his brother, Stevie Ray Vaughan, who died in 1990, and the memory of other deceased guitarists. The song was written by Art Neville, Eric Kolb, Aaron Neville, Cyril Neville, Kelsey Smith, and Vaughan. It first appeared on Vaughan's album Strange Pleasure, in 1994.

The song was originally performed as an acoustic blues. The opening line, "Alpine Valley, in the middle of the night", refers to the Alpine Valley Music Theater, near East Troy, Wisconsin, where the helicopter carrying Stevie Ray Vaughan and several others crashed following a concert in 1990. The song also mentions several other deceased blues guitarists: Jimi Hendrix (as the "voodoo child"), Albert Collins, Muddy Waters, and Lightnin' Hopkins. Its refrain includes the lyric "Heaven done called another blues stringer back home".

Later versions of the song have been performed as electric blues with accompaniment. Live recordings include a 1996 tribute concert to Stevie Ray Vaughan, with Jimmie Vaughan, Eric Clapton, B.B. King, Robert Cray, Dr. John, Bonnie Raitt, Art Neville and Buddy Guy. Vaughan, Clapton, and others performed it at the Crossroads Guitar Festival in 2004 and again in 2010 by Vaughan, Clapton, Robert Cray and Hubert Sumlin.
