= Radio Heart (band) =

Scottish band

- Origin: United Kingdom
- Years active: 1986–1988

Radio Heart was a music project by the Scottish brothers Hugh and David Nicholson, formerly of Blue, who are best known for their collaboration with Gary Numan in 1987.

== History ==
Radio Heart was formed as a music project by brothers Hugh and David Nicholson as a vehicle for a number of songs Hugh Nicholson had written. Gary Numan became involved with Radio Heart through the Nicholson's brother, Matt Nicholson, who at the time formed part of the management team for Numan's label Numa Records, alongside Numan and his father Tony Webb.

In 1986, as Numa Records was in the process of being wound up, Matt Nicholson suggested Numan provide vocals on the song "Radio Heart". Once the Nicholson brothers had recorded most of the backing track, Ade Orange provided keyboards and Numan then contributed vocals. The song was released as a single in March 1987 under the name 'Radio Heart featuring Gary Numan' and reached number 35 on the UK singles chart in April. Two further songs were recorded with Numan and released as singles during the year; "London Times" reached number 48 in the UK in June 1987 and "All Across the Nation" reached number 81 in November 1987.

Following the release of "London Times", the Nicholsons approached Numan about recording an album's worth of material with him on vocals. Numan suggested they forward songs for his consideration and he would pick the ones he liked, leaving the rest for other singers. However, Numan was not keen on the material beyond the three songs he had already recorded, and the singer did not make further contributions towards the project.

The album Radio Heart was released in January 1988, with Hugh Nicholson as vocalist on the rest of the material. In addition to Numan's involvement, Elton John plays keyboards on two of the album's tracks, "Strange Thing" and "The Victim". The album sleeve heavily promoted Numan and John's involvement without their approval and the album was soon withdrawn due to legal issues.

In 1993, the Nicholsons teamed up with Numan again to record the Hugh Nicholson-penned "Like a Refugee (I Won't Cry)". Numan listened to the song's demo in his dressing room, prior to his concert at Birmingham Town Hall on 27 October 1993, and arranged to record his vocals the following day. The song was released as a single under the name 'Numan & Dadadang' and reached number 78 in the UK Singles Chart in May 1994. A music video was shot in Bergamo and featured the marching band Da Da Dang.

In 1999, a compilation album, 1987-1994, was released under the name Nicholson/Numan. The release combined the three Radio Heart singles and "Like a Refugee (I Won't Cry)" with various remixes and demo versions. In 2018, Demon Music Group released the Radio Heart album as a double-LP set with bonus tracks, including remixes and B-sides.

On 18 February 2024, "Radio Heart", under the name of Gary Numan, entered number 35 on "Mike Read's Heritage Chart Show". On its seventh week in the chart it had reached number 1 and remained there for two weeks. Currently it has been in the chart for ten weeks.

== Discography ==
Albums

- Radio Heart (1988)

Compilations

- 1987–1994 (as Nicholson/Numan) (1999)

Singles

- "Radio Heart" (1987)
- "London Times" (1987)
- "All Across the Nation" (1987)
