= Sharpe & Numan =

British synth-pop musical duo

- Origin: England
- Genres: Synth-pop
- Years active: 1985–1989
- Label: Polydor
- Past members: Bill Sharpe; Gary Numan

Sharpe & Numan was a British synth-pop duo formed by Shakatak's Bill Sharpe (keyboards, record producer) and Gary Numan (vocals).

They had success with their first single "Change Your Mind" which was a top 20 hit on the UK singles chart, peaking at No. 17 in March 1985. Subsequent singles were less successful and in 1989 they released their debut and sole studio album Automatic. Their music has been characterized as a mix of synth-pop and soul typical of the mid-1980s.

== History ==
The duo teamed up when they happened to be recording in the same studio. Sharpe had written a collection of songs for a solo album and Gary Numan provided vocals for "Change Your Mind". Released as a single on Polydor Records, it reached number 17 on the UK singles chart in March 1985.

Intended as a one-off collaboration, Sharpe and Numan eventually returned with "New Thing from London Town" in 1986. Released on Numan's label Numa Records, it was only a minor chart hit peaking at number 52. Signed to Polydor, they subsequently reunited again and released the single "No More Lies" in 1988 which fared slightly better on the UK chart, reaching the top 40.

In 1989, the single "I'm on Automatic" was another minor hit and the same year they released their first and only album Automatic, which spent only one week on the UK Albums Chart at number 59.

== Discography ==
=== Album ===
- 1989: Automatic – UK No. 59

=== Singles ===
- 1985: "Change Your Mind" – UK No. 17
- 1986: "New Thing from London Town" – UK No. 52
- 1988: "No More Lies" – UK No. 34
- 1989: "I'm on Automatic" – UK No. 44
