= Chaz Jankel =

English rock musician (born 1952)

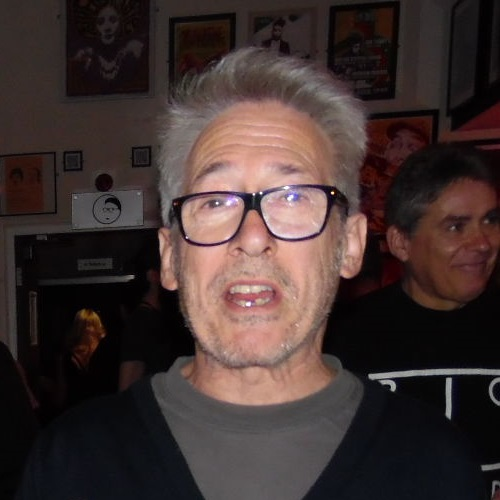
- Jankel before a concert with the Blockheads at Band on the Wall in Manchester, England, 2016

Background information
- Also known as: Chas Jankel
- Born: Charles Jeremy Jankel; 16 April 1952 (age 74); Stanmore, Middlesex, England
- Origin: London, England
- Genres: New wave; blue-eyed soul; disco; funk; R&B; punk rock; soul
- Occupations: Musician; songwriter; arranger; composer; record producer
- Instruments: Vocals; guitar; piano; keyboards; synthesizer; organ; percussion
- Years active: 1973–present
- Labels: GM; Stiff; Polydor; Demon; Ronnie Harris; A&M; Virgin; Tirk; CJ
- Member of: The Blockheads
- Formerly of: Byzantium
- Website: chazjankel.com

Charles Jeremy Jankel (born 16 April 1952) is an English musician and songwriter. In a music career spanning more than 50 years, he came to prominence in the late 1970s as the guitarist and keyboardist of the rock band Ian Dury and the Blockheads. With Dury, Jankel co-wrote some of the band's best-known songs including "Sex & Drugs & Rock & Roll", "Hit Me with Your Rhythm Stick" and "Reasons to Be Cheerful, Part 3".

In addition to his work with the Blockheads, Jankel has had a solo career which has resulted in ten studio albums. He has a long list of credits as both a performer and as songwriter.

== Early life ==
Charles Jeremy Jankel was born on 16 April 1952 in Stanmore, Middlesex. Inspired by the skiffle singer Lonnie Donegan, he started to learn how to play the Spanish guitar at age 7, and then went on to study the piano. He attended the boarding school Mill Hill School in London and became a fan of the American rock, funk and soul band Sly and the Family Stone during his time there. Jankel's fondness for this style was later responsible for much of the funk influence on the Blockheads' music and also influenced Jankel's solo career. As a student at the art college Saint Martin's School of Art he played with a rock band called Byzantium from 1972 to 1973.

== Career ==
In 1973, Jankel contributed a track titled "Let's Go" to Long John Baldry's studio album Good to Be Alive. He then joined the folk rock band Jonathan Kelly's Outside and played lead guitar on three tracks on their only studio album ...Waiting on You, released in February 1974. Jankel first started working with Ian Dury as part of the pub rock band Kilburn and the High Roads in the early part of the 1970s. He went on to work with Dury on studio albums such as 1977's New Boots and Panties!! and the Blockheads' albums including the 1979 release Do It Yourself before leaving the band. He wrote funk songs such as "Hit Me with Your Rhythm Stick", and "Sex & Drugs & Rock & Roll". In 1981, Jankel joined Dury again, without the Blockheads, for his second solo studio album Lord Upminster, which spawned the US Top 40 dance hit "Spasticus Autisticus", which he co-wrote.

After leaving the Blockheads, Jankel pursued a solo career and issued four studio albums for A&M, including his 1980 self-titled debut and 1981's Chasanova, which was also released under the title Questionnaire. This album featured major lyrical contributions from Ian Dury, and musical contributions from two of the Blockheads, bassist Norman Watt-Roy, and drummer Charlie Charles and also contained the US dance hit "Glad to Know You", which was one of the tracks with lyrics written by Dury, plus the MTV music video of its title track. In 1981, Quincy Jones had a UK chart hit with a cover version of Jankel's "Ai No Corrida", which reached No. 14 in April of that year. The song was also covered by the Nylons, and Laura More with Uniting Nations. In 2005, the Uniting Nations' version peaked at No. 18 in the UK.

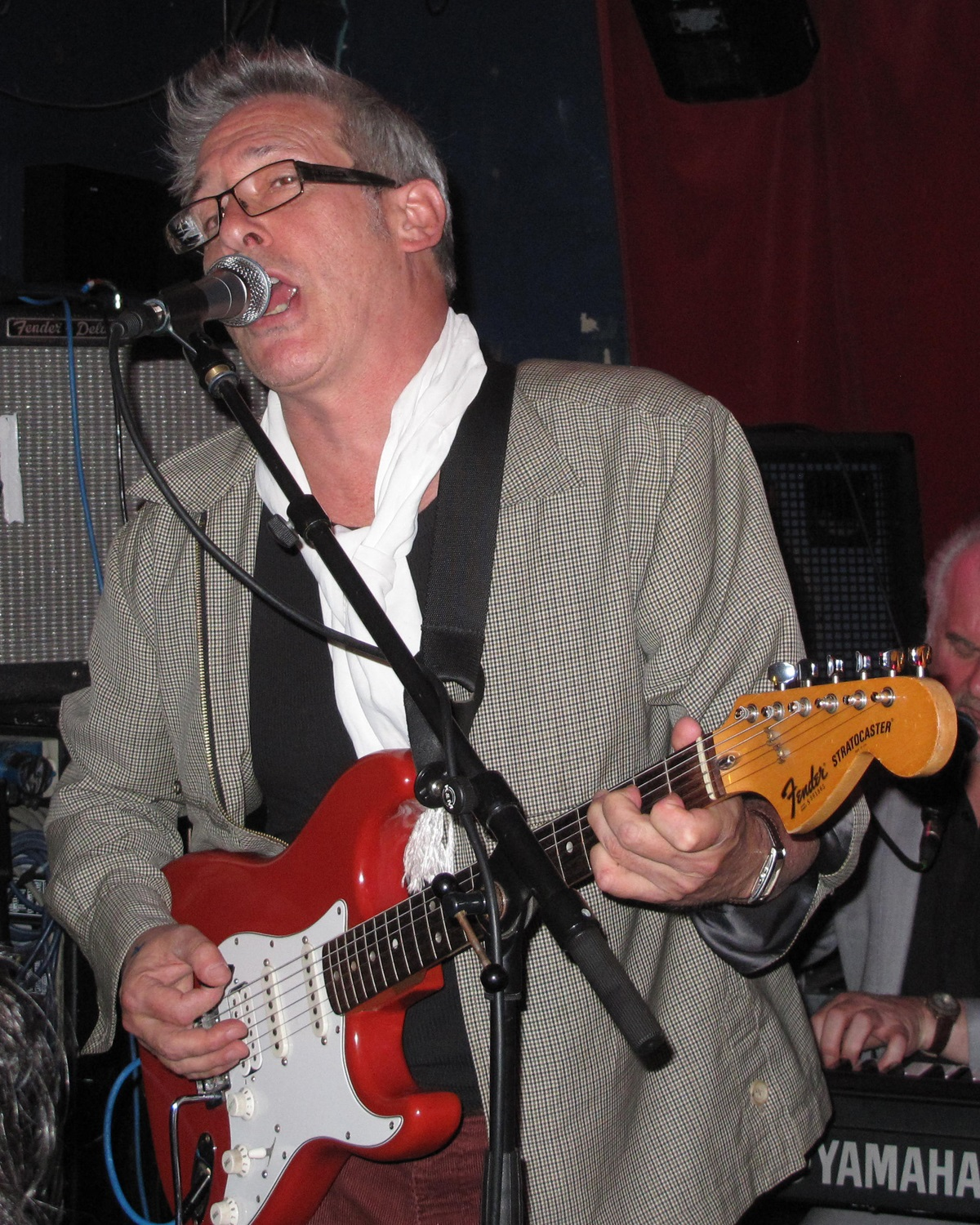
Jankel performing live with the Blockheads at The Water Rats in London, England, 2011

Jankel hit No. 1 on the Hot Dance Music/Club Play chart in 1982 with the triple A-side "Glad to Know You"/"3,000,000 Synths"/"Ai No Corrida". His single "Number One" went to No. 1 in the clubs in France and was used in the American science fiction comedy film Real Genius (1985), starring Val Kilmer. He went on to release the studio albums Chazablanca in 1983 and Looking at You in 1985. In 1985 Jerry Moss, the recording executive of A&M, rejected the release of his fifth studio album, and terminated his recording contract with the label.

After both of Jankel's parents died, he moved to the US in 1988 and lived there for several years before returning to the UK to rejoin the Blockheads, working with Dury on their final two studio albums with him: Mr. Love Pants (1998), and Ten More Turnips from the Tip (2000) on which later album he took lead vocals on the song "I Could Lie". After Dury's death in 2000, Jankel continued to write and perform with the Blockheads, with Dury's former friend and minder Derek Hussey being Dury's replacement.

Jankel has several composer credits for films, including D.O.A. (1988), starring Dennis Quaid and Meg Ryan, which was co-directed by his sister Annabel Jankel, and K2 (1991), starring Michael Biehn. Jankel composed the majority of the music for the Dury biographical film Sex & Drugs & Rock & Roll (2010), in which he was portrayed by Tom Hughes. Jankel received a BAFTA nomination for the film's music.

In 2010, Jankel released his first compilation album titled My Occupation – The Music of Chaz Jankel which included the songs "Ai No Corrida", "Glad to Know You" and "You're My Occupation". This album also contained the additional song "Get Myself Together"

Since 2001 Jankel had issued records on his own CJ Records label. Jankel recorded a single with Cherry Cameron in 2016.

== Personal life ==
In September 1988 Jankel moved to Venice, Los Angeles, where he lived with his Swedish girlfriend Catharina Hemberg. They were married on the island of Kauai in Hawaii. Jankel and Hemberg have a son, Tao Hemberg Jankel, born in Hollywood in 1990. Tao lives and works in Oslo, Norway and is a successful DJ; when he was very young, his parents divorced and his mother moved back to Sweden.

In 1992 Jankel moved back to the UK, where he met artist Elaine O'Halloran, on the set of the comedy drama film The Rachel Papers (1989), where she was assistant editor. The couple married and have a son, Lewis Shay Jankel, born in 1993, who is a DJ, record producer, singer and songwriter, using the stage name Shift K3y. He went on to have hits with his 2014 singles "Touch", which peaked at number 3 on the UK Singles Chart, and "I Know".

His sister Annabel Jankel is a film and television director who, in 2018, directed the British film drama Tell It to the Bees; Jankel wrote a piano piece called "Unresolved" which features in the soundtrack.

== Discography ==
=== Solo albums ===
Year	Title	Label
1980	Chas Jankel	A&M
1981	Chasanova	A&M
1983	Chazablanca	A&M
1985	Looking at You	A&M
2001	Out of the Blue	CJ
2003	Zoom	CJ
2005	Experience	CJ
2008	A Bit on the Side	CJ
2010	The Submarine Has Surfaced	CJ
2023	Flow	CJ

=== Singles ===
Year	Title	B-side	Album
1974	"One Morning One Evening"	"Let's Work It Together"	non-album single
1980	"Ai No Corrida"	"Lenta Latina"	Chas Jankel
1981	"Am I Honest with Myself Really?" [Promo-only]	"Lenta Latina"	Chas Jankel
1981	"109"	"3,000,000 Synths"	Chasanova
1981	"Questionnaire"	"Boy"	Chasanova
1981	"Glad to Know You"	"3,000,000 Synths"/"Ai No Corrida"	Chasanova
1982	"Without You"	"To Wou Lady Kong"/"Rêve De Chèvre"	Chazablanca
1983	"I Can Get Over It (If You Can Get Over Here)"	"To Wou Lady Kong"	Chazablanca
1985	"No. 1"	"Tonight's the Night"/"Ai No Corrida (New York '85 Mix)"	Looking at You
1985	"Looking at You"	"Little Eva"	Looking at You
1986	"You're My Occupation" (featuring Brenda Jones of the Jones Girls)	"You're My Occupation (Dub Mix)"	non-album single
1988	"Nicaragua"	"Manon Manon"	non-album single
2009	"I Come Alive" (featuring Natalia Scott)	"Give It Up (Yam Who? Remix)"/"Give It Up (Original Version)"	non-album single
