= New Thing from London Town =

1986 single by Sharpe & Numan

Single by Sharpe & Numan
- Released: 22 September 1986
- Studio: Rock City Studios (Shepperton)
- Genre: Synth-pop
- Label: Numa
- Songwriter(s): Bill Sharpe; Roger Odell; Gary Numan
- Producer(s): Bill Sharpe

Sharpe & Numan singles chronology
"Change Your Mind" (1985)	"New Thing from London Town" (1986)	"Voices" (1988)

Music video
- "New Thing from London Town" on YouTube

"New Thing from London Town" is a song by the English synth-pop duo Sharpe & Numan, released as a single in September 1986 by Numa Records. Composed by Bill Sharpe with lyrics by Roger Odell and featuring lead vocals by Gary Numan, it spent three weeks on the UK singles chart, peaking at number 52.

Musically similar to the duo's previous hit single "Change Your Mind", Sharpe and Numan recorded the song at Rock City Studios, Shepperton with synthesizers and drum programming by Sharpe and vocals by Numan. The track was completed to its finished form in five days. A version of the song with new lyrics by Numan was included on his eighth solo studio album Strange Charm (1986), released shortly after the single.

== Critical reception ==
Upon its release, "New Thing from London Town" was "Single of the Forthnight" in Smash Hits, reviewer Ian Cranna writing: "The pair that brought you "Change Your Mind" now serve up brutally relentless crashing drums, sweeping but briskly melodic piano and synthesizer lines laced with chopped-up laughter and old Gazza's distinctive, erm, "singing" - quite apt here - to make a startingly efficient, almost dehumanised record."

== Track listing ==
7" single

- "New Thing from London Town" – 3:30
- "Time to Die" – 3:00

12" single

- "New Thing from London Town" – 8:00
- "Time to Die" – 4:10
