= Outland (Gary Numan album) =

Studio album by Gary Numan
- Released: 18 March 1991
- Recorded: 1990
- Studio: Outland Studio
- Genre: Funk; pop rock; synth-pop; industrial rock; new wave
- Length: 43:25
- Label: I.R.S.; EMI
- Producer: Gary Numan

Gary Numan chronology
| Automatic (1989) | Outland (1991) | Machine + Soul (1992) |

Singles from Outland
- 1. "Heart" Released: 4 March 1991; 2. "My World Storm" Released: June 1991 (US)

Professional ratings
Review scores
| Source | Rating |
|---|---|
| AllMusic | 3/5 stars |
| Q | 2/5 stars |

Outland is the tenth solo studio album by the English musician Gary Numan, released on 18 March 1991. It was Numan's second and last studio album to be released by I.R.S. Records. It reached Number 39 on the UK charts. The songs "Heart" and "My World Storm" were released as singles; "Heart" charted at Number 43, while "My World Storm" eventually became a US-only promo single after a planned UK release was shelved due to the inner turmoil at the label around the release of the album. The latter however reached Number 46 on the US dance chart. The reaction to it was mixed with Q Magazine calling it 'repetitive and full of affectation'.

== Overview ==
Musically, Outland maintained previous albums' synth-pop/dance-funk style, which would continue until the artist's 1994 industrial album Sacrifice. The rhythmic stylings of Outland are reminiscent of Numan's 1989 collaboration album with Bill Sharpe, Automatic, although its dystopian lyrics are more typical of Numan's solo work. Outland could almost be described as a concept album, as its songs share common themes and (in the case of the tracks "Confession" and "From Russia Infected") common musical and lyrical motifs. Indeed, Outland features more overt references to science-fiction than any other album Numan has released. The album features many vocal samples from notable sci-fi/action movies of the 1980s, including Blade Runner, The Terminator, Aliens and Predator (the title of Outland itself may be a reference to the 1981 science fiction film of the same name). The instrumental interludes on Outland add to the album's cinematic atmosphere. Of the album, Numan recalled:

The American producers Jam and Lewis were a big influence on Outland. I thought their grooves were extremely clever...Perhaps I should've taken the percussion thing and added something else to it, but my songwriting followed the black funk/dance/rock style as well. It wasn't entirely what my fans had been hoping for, although some thought it was one of my best albums. Being so involved, and responsible, for virtually every aspect of it, from writing to production to engineering, I felt it was a very personal record. By mastering the technology I was able to get closer to the sounds in my head.

== Track listing ==
All tracks are written by Gary Numan.

| No. | Title | Length |
|---|---|---|
| 1. | "(Interval 1)" | 1:13 |
| 2. | "Soul Protection" | 3:36 |
| 3. | "Confession" | 4:16 |
| 4. | "My World Storm" | 3:43 |
| 5. | "Dream Killer" | 4:22 |
| 6. | "Dark Sunday" | 4:02 |
| 7. | "Outland" | 4:05 |
| 8. | "Heart" | 4:06 |
| 9. | "(Interval 2)" | 0:18 |
| 10. | "From Russia Infected" | 4:30 |
| 11. | "(Interval 3)" | 0:38 |
| 12. | "Devotion" | 4:13 |
| 13. | "Whisper" | 4:20 |
| Total length: | | 43:25 |

1999 EMI re-issue
| No. | Title | Length |
|---|---|---|
| 14. | "Shame" | 4:48 |
| 15. | "Icehouse" | 3:19 |
| 16. | "Tread Careful" | 4:14 |
| 17. | "My World Storm" (US Promo Mix) | 5:45 |
| 18. | "My World Storm" (Alternative Mix) | 3:41 |
| Total length: | | 65:12 |

== Notes ==
- "My World Storm (US Promo Mix)" features a snippet from "Cars".
- "Shame" was planned as the first single in early 1990, but with the length of time taken for the final release of the album, the single was demoted to the b-side of the eventual first single, "Heart".

== Personnel ==
- Gary Numan – vocals, keyboards, bass, drum programming, percussion programming, acoustic guitar (track 5)
- Keith Beauvais – guitar
- Mike Smith – drum machines, keyboards, acoustic guitar (track 13), slide guitar (track 7), guitar (track 8), bass (track 8), bongos (track 8)
- Dick Morrissey – saxophone (track 5)
- Tim Whitehead – saxophone (tracks 6 and 8)
- Russell Bell – guitar (track 7)
- Nick Beggs – bass (track 8)
- Paul Harvey – rhythm guitar (track 12), slide guitar (track 12)
- Cathi Ogden – backing vocals
