= Wire discography =

Discography of the English post-punk band Wire

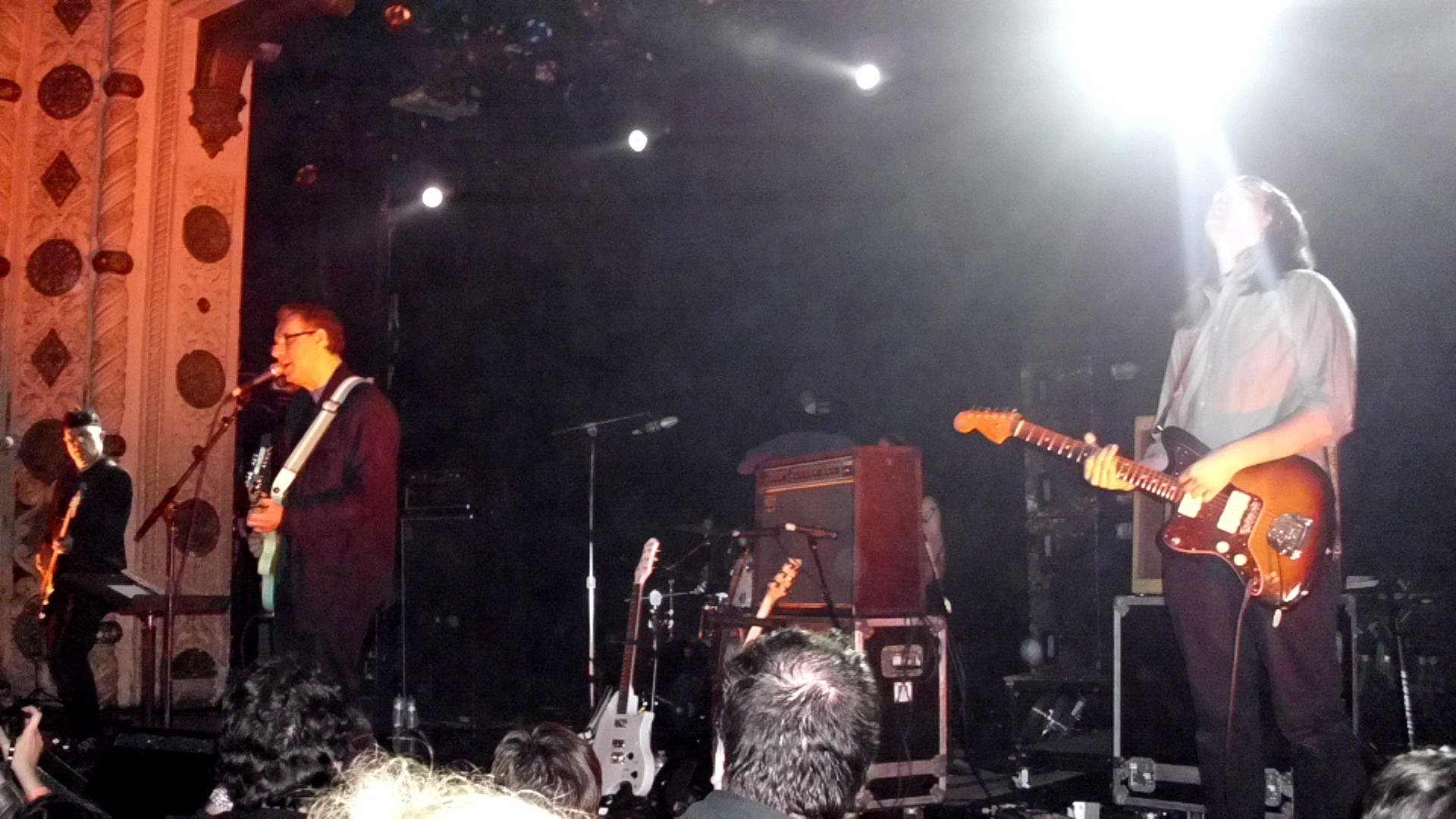
- Studio albums: 17
- Extended plays: 11
- Live albums: 26
- Compilation albums: 11
- Singles: 24
- Box sets: 3

The discography of Wire, an English rock band, consists of seventeen studio albums, twenty-six live albums, eleven compilation albums, eleven EPs, and twenty-four singles.

== Albums ==
=== Studio albums ===
Title	Album details	Peak chart positions					
Title	Album details	UK	UK Indie	BEL (FL)	SCO	US	US Heat.
Pink Flag	Released: November 1977; Label: Harvest; Formats: LP, MC, 8-track	—	—	—	—	—	—
Chairs Missing	Released: 8 September 1978; Label: Harvest; Formats: LP, MC	48	—	—	—	—	—
154	Released: 21 September 1979; Label: Harvest; Formats: LP, MC, 8-track	39	—	—	—	—	—
The Ideal Copy	Released: April 1987; Label: Mute; Formats: CD, LP, MC	87	1	—	—	—	—
A Bell Is a Cup... Until It Is Struck	Released: 16 May 1988; Label: Mute; Formats: CD, LP, MC	—	2	—	—	—	—
It's Beginning to and Back Again	Released: 30 May 1989; Label: Mute; Formats: CD, LP, MC	—	3	—	—	135	—
Manscape	Released: May 1990; Label: Mute; Formats: CD, LP, MC	—	5	—	—	—	—
The Drill	Released: April 1991; Label: Mute; Formats: CD, LP, MC	—	—	—	—	—	—
The First Letter	Released: 14 October 1991; Label: Mute; Formats: CD, LP, MC; As Wir	—	—	—	—	—	—
Object 47	Released: 7 July 2008; Label: Pinkflag; Formats: CD	—	—	—	—	—	—
Red Barked Tree	Released: 20 December 2010; Label: Pinkflag; Formats: CD	—	—	—	—	—	49
Change Becomes Us	Released: 18 March 2013; Label: Pinkflag; Formats: CD, 2xLP, digital download	—	44	165	—	—	23
Wire	Released: 13 April 2015; Label: Pinkflag; Formats: CD, LP, digital download	71	12	92	61	—	—
Nocturnal Koreans	Released: 22 April 2016; Label: Pinkflag; Formats: CD, LP, digital download	98	9	181	50	—	—
Silver/Lead	Released: 31 March 2017; Label: Pinkflag; Formats: CD, LP, digital download	96	8	124	54	—	—
Mind Hive	Released: 24 January 2020; Label: Pinkflag; Formats: CD, LP, digital download	82	6	155	22	—	—
"—" denotes releases that did not chart or were not released in that territory.

=== Live albums ===
Title	Album details	Peak chart positions
Title	Album details	UK Indie
Document and Eyewitness	Released: July 1981; Label: Rough Trade; Formats: 2xLP, MC	3
It's All in the Brochure	Released: May 2000; Label: Pinkflag; Formats: CD; Limited release	—
Wire on the Box: 1979	Released: 4 October 2004; Label: Pinkflag; Formats: CD+DVD	—
The Scottish Play: 2004	Released: 28 March 2005; Label: Pinkflag; Formats: CD+DVD	—
Live at the Roxy, London – April 1st & 2nd 1977/Live at CBGB Theatre, New York – July 18th 1978	Released: 13 November 2006; Label: Pinkflag; Formats: CD	—
Legal Bootleg Series: 25 Oct 1978 Bradford University	Released: 5 July 2010; Label: Pinkflag; Formats: digital download	—
Legal Bootleg Series: 21 Jul 1988 Astoria, London	Released: 5 July 2010; Label: Pinkflag; Formats: digital download	—
Legal Bootleg Series: 08 Dec 2000 Queen's Hall, Edinburgh	Released: 5 July 2010; Label: Pinkflag; Formats: digital download	—
Legal Bootleg Series: 14 Sept 2002 Metro, Chicago	Released: 5 July 2010; Label: Pinkflag; Formats: digital download	—
Legal Bootleg Series: 01 Dec 1987 The Town & Country, London	Released: 29 November 2010; Label: Pinkflag; Formats: digital download	—
Legal Bootleg Series: 19 April 2002 Fleece & Firkin, Bristol	Released: 29 November 2010; Label: Pinkflag; Formats: digital download	—
Legal Bootleg Series: 12 Nov 1978, SO36, Berlin	Released: 27 April 2011; Label: Pinkflag; Formats: digital download	—
Legal Bootleg Series: 17 Dec 1985 Paradiso, Amsterdam	Released: 27 April 2011; Label: Pinkflag; Formats: digital download	—
Legal Bootleg Series: 02 May 2000 Great American, San Francisco	Released: 27 April 2011; Label: Pinkflag; Formats: digital download	—
The Black Session: Paris, 10 May 2011	Released: 14 February 2012; Label: Pinkflag; Formats: CD, digital download	—
Legal Bootleg Series: Set 2 – 23 February 2000 Nottingham Social (Recycling Sherwood Forest)	Released: 16 January 2013; Label: Pinkflag; Formats: digital download	—
Legal Bootleg Series: Set 2 – 04 April 2011 WFMU, Jersey City – 13 April 2011 KEXP, Seattle	Released: 16 January 2013; Label: Pinkflag; Formats: digital download	—
Legal Bootleg Series: 10 Nov 1979 Jeannetta Cochrane Theatre, London	Released: 18 February 2013; Label: Pinkflag; Formats: digital download	—
Legal Bootleg Series: Set 2 – 12 June 1987 Maxwell's, Hoboken	Released: 18 February 2013; Label: Pinkflag; Formats: digital download	—
Legal Bootleg Series: Set 2 – 21 May 1990 Hibernian, London	Released: 18 February 2013; Label: Pinkflag; Formats: digital download	—
Legal Bootleg Series: Set 2 – 17 February 1978 West Runton Pavilion, Cromer	Released: 18 February 2013; Label: Pinkflag; Formats: digital download	—
Legal Bootleg Series: Set 2 – 12 July 1991 Mean Fiddler, London	Released: 21 October 2013; Label: Pinkflag; Formats: digital download	—
Legal Bootleg Series: Set 2 – 05 March 1979 Carre, Amsterdam	Released: 21 October 2013; Label: Pinkflag; Formats: digital download	—
Legal Bootleg Series: Set 2 – 09 August 2009 Off Festival, Myslowice	Released: 21 October 2013; Label: Pinkflag; Formats: digital download	—
Legal Bootleg Series: Set 2 – 09 March 1979 Pavilion, Montreux	Released: 23 June 2014; Label: Pinkflag; Formats: digital download	—
Legal Bootleg Series: Set 2 – 19 July 1979 Notre Dame Hall, London	Released: 23 June 2014; Label: Pinkflag; Formats: digital download	—
"—" denotes releases that did not chart.

=== Compilation albums ===
Title	Album details	Peak chart positions
Title	Album details	UK Indie
And Here It Is...Again...	Released: November 1984; Label: Sneaky Pete; Formats: LP; Germany-only release	—
Wire Play Pop	Released: March 1986; Label: The Pink Label; Formats: LP	4
In the Pink	Released: August 1986; Label: Dojo; Formats: LP	—
On Returning (1977–1979)	Released: July 1989; Label: Harvest/EMI; Formats: CD, LP, MC	—
The Peel Sessions Album	Released: January 1990; Label: Strange Fruit; Formats: CD, LP, MC	—
1985–1990: The A List	Released: 17 May 1993; Label: Mute; Formats: CD, 2xLP, MC	—
Behind the Curtain: Early Versions 1977 & 78	Released: 5 May 1995; Label: EMI; Formats: CD	—
Turns and Strokes	Released: May 1996; Label: WMO; Formats: CD, 2xLP	—
Coatings	Released: 21 October 1997; Label: WMO; Formats: CD	—
PF456 Redux	Released: 28 April 2003 (LP); Rereleased: 13 August 2021 (CD); Label: Pinkflag; Formats: LP, CD; Limited release LP	—
Send	Released: 28 April 2003; Label: Pinkflag; Formats: CD	—
Send Ultimate	Released: 1 July 2010; Label: Pinkflag; Formats: CD	—
10:20	Released: 19 June 2020; Label: Pinkflag; Formats: CD, LP, digital download	23
PF456 Deluxe	Released: 12 June 2021; Label: Pinkflag; Formats: LP, digital download	
Not About To Die	Released: 23 April 2022 (LP); Released: 24 June 2022 (CD); Label: Pinkflag; Formats: CD, LP, digital download	
Nine Sevens	Released: 13 April 2025; Label: Pinkflag; Formats: 2xLP, digital download; Rerelease of Nine Sevens box set	
"—" denotes releases that did not chart.

=== Box sets ===
Title	Album details
The Drill	Released: 1991; Label: Mute; Formats: 3xLP+7"; Limited release
Wire: 1977–1979	Released: 14 May 2006; Label: Pinkflag; Formats: 5xCD; US-only limited release
Nine Sevens	Released: 21 April 2018; Label: Pinkflag; Formats: 9x7"

== EPs ==
Title	Album details	Peak chart positions
Title	Album details	UK Indie
Snakedrill	Released: November 1986; Label: Mute; Formats: 12"	3
Ahead	Released: March 1987; Label: Mute; Formats: 12"	—
The Peel Sessions	Released: November 1987; Label: Strange Fruit; Formats: 12", MC	18
Silk Skin Paws	Released: June 1989; Label: Mute; Formats: CD, 12"	—
The Third Day	Released: 1 February 2000; Label: Pinkflag; Formats: CD	—
Read & Burn 01	Released: 17 June 2002; Label: Pinkflag; Formats: CD	—
Read & Burn 02	Released: 1 October 2002; Label: Pinkflag; Formats: CD	—
Read & Burn 03	Released: 5 November 2007; Label: Pinkflag; Formats: CD	—
Daytrotter Session	Released: 10 November 2008; Label: Daytrotter; Formats: digital download	—
Strays	Released: January 2011; Label: Pinkflag; Formats: CD, digital download; Limited release with Red Barked Tree; Rereleased as part of 10:20	—
Daytrotter Session	Released: 23 January 2013; Label: Daytrotter; Formats: digital download	—
Vien+	Released: 12 April 2025; (2 of 3 tracks first released on Touch label CD EP "Vien" in 1997): Label: Pinkflag; Formats: 12"; As Wir; Record Store Day 2025	—
"—" denotes releases that did not chart or were not released in that territory.

== Singles ==
Title	Year	Peak chart positions			Album
Title	Year	UK	UK Indie	US Alt	Album
"Mannequin"	1977	—	—	—	Pink Flag
"I Am the Fly"	1978	—	—	—	Chairs Missing
"Dot Dash"	1978	—	—	—	Non-album single
"Outdoor Miner"	1979	51	—	—	Chairs Missing
"A Question of Degree"	1979	—	—	—	Non-album single
"Map Ref. 41˚N 93˚W"	1979	—	—	—	154
"Our Swimmer"	1981	—	13	—	Document & Eyewitness
"Crazy About Love"	1983	—	28	—	Non-album single
"Ahead"	1987	—	2	—	The Ideal Copy
"Kidney Bingos"	1988	88	8	—	A Bell Is a Cup... Until It Is Struck
"Silk Skin Paws"	1988	—	4	—	A Bell Is a Cup... Until It Is Struck
"Eardrum Buzz"	1989	68	5	2	It's Beginning to and Back Again
"In Vivo"	1989	—	11	24	It's Beginning to and Back Again
"Life in the Manscape" (US-only release)	1990	—	—	—	Manscape
"In Every City?" (US promo-only release)	1991	—	—	—	The Drill
"So and Slow It Grows" (as Wir)	1991	—	—	—	The First Letter
"The First Letter" (as Wir)	1997	—	—	—	Non-album singles
"Twelve Times You" (limited release)	2000	—	—	—	Non-album singles
"Short Elevated Period"	2017	—	—	—	Silver/Lead
"Joust & Jostle"	2017	—	—	—	Wire
"Cactused"	2019	—	—	—	Mind Hive
"Primed and Ready"	2020	—	—	—	Mind Hive
"Small Black Reptile"	2020	—	—	—	10:20
"The Art of Persistence"	2020	—	—	—	10:20
"—" denotes releases that did not chart or were not released in that territory.
