= 10:20 (Wire album) =

Compilation album by Wire
- Released: 19 June 2020
- Recorded: 2010–2019
- Studios: Resident Studios (London); Swim Studio (London); Rockfield Studios (Monmouth, Wales)
- Genres: Art punk; post-punk
- Length: 38:16
- Label: Pinkflag
- Producer: Colin Newman

Wire chronology
Mind Hive (2020)	10:20 (2020)

Singles from 10:20
- 1. "Small Black Reptile" Released: 11 March 2020; 2. "The Art of Persistence" Released: 19 June 2020

10:20 is a compilation album by English art punk band Wire, released on 19 June 2020 through their own Pinkflag label.

The band considers it a collection of "stray" tracks that didn't fit on previous albums, including rerecorded songs dating back to the 1980s that evolved substantially through live performance, and which the band felt deserved a new life on an album. 10:20 was originally planned for the cancelled Record Store Day in April 2020 as vinyl-only, but was eventually released in multiple formats. The album title alludes to the recording dates of the album and its release (2010–2020), and also ten years of guitarist Matthew Simms being in the band.

== Tracks background ==
The first four tracks on the album were recorded in November 2010 and feature contributions from Margaret Fiedler McGinnis, Wire's touring guitarist between 2008 and 2009, and Matthew Simms, touring guitarist since 2010 and official member since 2012. The tracks were previously available on the limited edition bonus EP Strays, included with early copies of Red Barked Tree in 2010. The last four tracks were recorded in the late 2010s with the current lineup of Simms and original members Colin Newman, Graham Lewis, and Robert Grey.

Album opener "Boiling Boy" first appeared on 1988's A Bell Is a Cup... Until It Is Struck. The 10:20 recording uses the arrangement that developed in the 2000s, where it became a staple in the band's live sets. "German Shepherds" was originally recorded for 1989's It's Beginning To And Back Again, and is another Wire song that gained a second lease on life through the live shows. "He Knows" was developed in 2000 and reinvigorated in 2008 when it too became a staple of Wire's live set. This is the only studio recording to have surfaced. "Underwater Experiences" was originally demoed for 1978's Chairs Missing. It later appeared on the 1981 live album Document and Eyewitness and on 2013's Change Becomes Us, retitled as "Attractive Space".

"The Art of Persistence" was previously only available as a rehearsal run-through on 2000's The Third Day EP and as a live recording on Legal Bootleg Series: Set 2 – 23 February 2000 Nottingham Social (Recycling Sherwood Forest). "Small Black Reptile" originally appeared on the 1990 album Manscape, and is the song on 10:20 that has changed the most, from an electronic-driven version to a melodic rock track. "Wolf Collides" was written in 2015 and included in that year's live set. This recording is an outtake from the sessions for 2017's Silver/Lead. "Over Theirs" appeared on 1987's The Ideal Copy and has made sporadic visits to Wire's live shows since 1985. "The Art of Persistence", "Small Black Reptile" and "Over Theirs" were all recorded during the Mind Hive sessions between 2018 and 2019 for an abandoned book edition of the album with extra tracks on it.

== Reception ==
Professional ratings
Aggregate scores
Source	Rating
Metacritic	76/100
Review scores
Source	Rating
AllMusic	4/5 stars
Exclaim!	7/10
The Fire Note	3.5/5 stars
PopMatters	7/10 stars
The Spill Magazine	9/10 stars

PopMatters called it "both essential for fans and an excellent primer for new listeners." The Spill Magazine awarded the album 9 out of 10, describing it as "a brilliant snapshot of songs in a state of chrysalis, like a momentary acknowledgement that nothing truly ends."

== Track listing ==
All lyrics are written by Graham Lewis, except "Boiling Boy" by Bruce Gilbert; all music is composed by Colin Newman (song) and Wire (music).

10
No.	Title	Length
1.	"Boiling Boy" (10:20 version)	6:22
2.	"German Shepherds" (10:20 version)	4:28
3.	"He Knows"	4:40
4.	"Underwater Experiences" (10:20 version)	2:20

20
No.	Title	Length
5.	"The Art of Persistence"	3:47
6.	"Small Black Reptile" (10:20 version)	3:42
7.	"Wolf Collides"	4:06
8.	"Over Theirs" (10:20 version)	8:51

== Personnel ==
Wire

- Colin Newman – vocals, electric guitar, keyboards (5–8), acoustic guitar (5)
- Graham Lewis – bass, backing vocals (1–4), intro/outro loop (7), noises (8)
- Robert Grey – drums
- Matthew Simms – electric guitar, drone (8)

Additional musicians

- Margaret Fiedler McGinnis – electric guitar (1, 3, 4), spoken voice (2)

Technical personnel

- Colin Newman – producer, mixing
- Sean Douglas – engineer (1–6, 8)
- Jeroen Melchers – engineer (7)
- Matthew Simms – additional engineer (5–8)
- Denis Blackham – mastering
- Jon Wozencroft – art direction, photography

Tracks 1–4 recorded at Resident Studios, London and Swim Studio, London; tracks 5–8 recorded at Rockfield Studios, Monmouth, Wales and Swim Studio

== See also ==
- List of 2020 albums
