= Red Barked Tree =

Studio album by Wire
- Released: 20 December 2010
- Recorded: February–October 2010
- Studios: Resident Studios, London; Press Play Studios, London; Swim Studio, London
- Genres: Post-punk; experimental rock
- Length: 39:03
- Label: Pinkflag
- Producer: Colin Newman

Wire chronology
Object 47 (2008)	Red Barked Tree (2010)	Change Becomes Us (2013)

Red Barked Tree is the twelfth studio album by the English post-punk band Wire, digitally released on 20 December 2010, and as a CD on 10 January 2011 on the Pinkflag label. Featuring eleven tracks covering a diverse range of musical styles, the record was well received by critics, who found the record representing "the essence of their best work", covering "virtually all aspects of Wire's varied history" to create "a stylistic best-of composed of new material".

== Writing and recording ==
The departure of founding member Bruce Gilbert in 2006 left Wire as a trio composed of Colin Newman (vocals, guitar, various), Graham Lewis (bass, vocals, various) and Robert Grey (drums). Having released Object 47 in 2008, the band had originally intended to record Red Barked Tree in December 2009 at Githead and Wire soundman Frankie Lievaart's studio in Rotterdam, but Lievaart proved unable to trace having left the country with Gogol Bordello. The only alternative would have been Newman's Swim studio, but as Newman explained to emusic.com, this would not have been suitable: "I can produce fairly decent-sounding mixes here [at Swim], but for physical recording, if you're going to record drums in a nice room, first of all you've got to have a nice room and someone who knows how to record drums. If you're going to record a whole band, you've got to have the right place to do it." With their preferred option not being available the band decided to book four days in a commercial studio in London, Resident Studios, which put the recording date back to February 2010.

Newman had written some songs for the album. He said, "My method of writing songs, which I hadn't used for 30 years, is to write them on acoustic guitar. They take an average of five minutes each. If it's not written in five minutes, it's not going to get written. I'd sit on the couch, play a bit, if I had some words from Graham, jam 'em in, record it to my iPhone, then I'd present a bunch of songs to Rob and Graham. Rob said [derisively], 'It sounds like the '70s' and Graham said, 'I hate acoustic guitar,' so I knew we were onto a winner. That's so classic Wire." Lewis would contribute two compositions to the album, "Please Take" and "Bad Worn Thing".

However, one week before recording was due to start, a dearth of material became apparent: "I had four songs written, because that was all the lyrics I had from Graham. And I realized I wasn't getting any more words out of him. So I had to write a song a day so there was enough. Graham came with a couple of things but there was no way he would come with enough songs to fill out the rest of the record. So I took an instant editorial decision that was what was going to happen. Some of those words stayed, and some of those words got worked on by Graham and me. That was it, basically." The band worked on more than a dozen songs, dropping those that were not "working quite well enough". Many of the songs were recorded in a single take, the band playing as a threesome: "You have to understand, as a three-piece, we'd very rarely played together. [...] So [for Red Barked Tree,] I thought, 'Let's see how it goes in the studio.' We worked with an engineer that we'd never worked with before, who was Irish. We did 'Moreover,' and after we were done playing, he came in and said, 'You make a big fookin' noise for three.'" The band felt vindicated. Newman then worked through spring at his Swim studio, putting the tracks together, and after a further two-day session in June at Press Play Studios in London, the tracks were again worked on by Newman at Swim. By October, the mixing of the album was completed.

== Release ==
The album was released digitally on 20 December 2010, and in CD format on 10 January 2011, on the band's Pinkflag label. It was Wire's twelfth studio album, their third since the turn of the millennium, and the second since the departure of Gilbert. The Wire website, pinkflag.com, announced that the first 2,000 mail order customers for Red Barked Tree would also receive a free copy of Strays, a bonus EP featuring new studio recordings of the songs "Underwater Experiences", "He Knows", "German Shepherds" and "Boiling Boy". In 2020, the four tracks were included on the 10:20 album.

While it had taken the band three months to come up with a title for their previous album, Object 47, they almost immediately agreed on naming the current record Red Barked Tree. According to Lewis, the cover artwork by Jon Wozencroft – based on a photograph showing a detail of an untitled work by Arte Povera artist Jannis Kounellis – reflects the idea of alchemy as a quest for knowledge.

== Style ==
A press release announcing the album stated that it "rekindles a lyricism sometimes absent from Wire's previous work and reconnects with the live energy of performance, harnessed and channeled from extensive touring over the past few years." Featuring songs that "range from the hymnal 'Adapt' to the barking sledgehammer art-punk of 'Two Minutes', the album encompasses the full palette of style and nuance that has always endeared Wire to pastel-tinged pop aficionados and bleeding-edge avant-rockers alike."

"Two Minutes"
Described in the New Zealand Herald as "mad but disciplined guitar thrash". Robert Grey said about the lyrics: "I did think the words were very strange until Colin told me that he'd collected them from random texts."

"Down To This"
"A manifesto lamenting contemporary discontents," the Kansas City Star said. Graham Lewis stated, "It projects a creeping sense of doom: urban malfunction ..."

"Red Barked Trees"
Colin Newman was particularly pleased with this track: "There's nothing in our catalogue that sounds anything like it, and that pleases me immensely."

A guitar-dominated album, its musical styles range from thrash, art pop and power pop to psychedelic folk featuring acoustic guitar. Pitchfork described Red Barked Tree as "a shrewdly sequenced album," a necessity arising from the variety of different styles represented on it. "Its 11 songs are more or less positioned along a logical arc, where a sense of ominous unease gives way to violent release before simmering into a peaceful comedown." Grey stated in an interview with The Quietus, "I was asked to propose a track sequence for the album, and I found it difficult initially. Then I realised that if I thought of the tracks as a series of scenes in a play or a film, it made it easier. I like the idea of the tracks telling a story: the story was the album from beginning to end."

As described by Pitchfork, the album's lyrics address "the emotional and environmental costs of modernity run amok". "Red Barked Trees", the track that inspired the album title, was said by Lewis to be "about dismay and hope, and the wonder of technology versus the ancient knowledge of alchemy. Will we destroy rare invaluable flora and fauna before we can research and exploit their unique properties? In the end, is it going to be the red-barked tree that's going to hold the cure for cancer?" Newman stated about the song, "It's got an open-eyed beauty to it, looking at the world as a mysterious place. It's more like Pentangle than Wire! Wire have never made a track anything like it: it's in ¾ time, with acoustic guitars, bouzouki and organ. It's an innovative track for Wire – perhaps the most different. There's nothing in our catalogue that sounds anything like it, and that pleases me immensely." Newman revealed that the track "Two Minutes" is "a kind of construct lyrically," a set of tweets he collected that were "completely abstracted out."

== Reception ==
Professional ratings
Aggregate scores
Source	Rating
Metacritic	77/100
Review scores
Source	Rating
AllMusic	3/5 stars
BBC	(favourable)
Robert Christgau	(2-star Honorable Mention)
The Independent	4/5 stars
MusicOMH	4/5 stars
New Zealand Herald	(4/5)
NME	(8/10)
Pitchfork	(8.0/10)
PopMatters	8/10 stars
Rave Magazine	4.5/5 stars

The album has been well received by critics. The BBC review by Garry Mulholland described the record as "40 minutes of gorgeous nothings, full of intricate curlicues of sparkling Colin Newman guitar and synth given beef by the surging rhythms of Robert Grey aka Gotobed and Graham Lewis [...] if you love alternative guitar music, you will love this, because Wire play alternative guitar music better than any young British band you can name." PopMatters rated Red Barked Tree 8 out of 10, stating, "Selecting a standout track is no easy feat when there's so much to sink one's teeth into. [...] Over 11 tracks of fantastically unapproachable guitars and vocals, of deceivingly simple rhythms and unswerving purpose, Wire sound perfectly comfortable in their own skin and sense of history on Red Barked Tree." The Quietus described the record as "a Wire album, through and through [...] Red Barked Tree reclaims the essence of their best work – the irreverence, the serene self-assuredness and the melody, but it's their lesser recognized attribute – a gamely grace – that eclipses all else here [...] as products of the post-punk generation their songs are full of contradictions: simultaneously friendly and unfamiliar; arithmetical but rolling; and rabble-rousing but vaguely neutral. The overall outcome is a sound much like a summer cold – woebegone and chilled but caressed with ripples of tingly heat, valanced by Newman's nacreous rhythm guitar that twirls through the wet, refined production beautifying everything it touches." The Pitchfork review by Stuart Berman noted the presence of acoustic guitars in three tracks and the record's "impulsive stylistic shifts – from mechanized thrash to psychedelic folk to nervy power-pop – mirror[ing] the 'age of fragmentation' that Colin Newman is railing against. [...] Wire have successfully reinvented themselves, this time as wise elder statesmen cautioning against a world where over-reliance on GPS systems has replaced the basic survivalist skill of knowing your map references."

The New Zealand Herald gave the record four stars out of five, stating that "aside from disconcerting lyrics throughout which are droll and sometimes sharply witty – there are blasts of their more recent musical menace here too: 'Two Minutes' is a mad but disciplined guitar thrash; 'Moreover' and 'Smash' are crafted Erasehead-grind metallic pop; the brooding 'Down to This' rides on electrostatic and repeated guitar and keyboard phrases. Smart, sharp, approachable and economic, Wire again give art-rock a very good name." The Kansas City Star commented, "virtually all aspects of Wire's varied history are covered, creating a stylistic best-of composed of new material. It may be the band's best work since 1979's 154. [...] If influence were sufficient currency to buy one's way into the Rock and Roll Hall of Fame, Wire would be a contender. You can count bands as diverse as R.E.M., Guided By Voices, the Manic Street Preachers, Minor Threat and the Cure as among those who confess a fondness for Wire that extends to inspiration. Red Barked Tree demonstrates that Wire can be a sustained influence; it's a most worthy addition to the band's estimable catalog." The Independent gave the album a 4-star rating, stating that "on this showing, the feral rage of [Wire's] punk youth has matured into a pleasingly poised disaffection, with no loss of acuity," while The Guardian, reviewing a live performance, concluded that Red Barked Tree sees Wire "operating at full strength. Theirs are succinct and eloquent songs; in a long career Wire continue to deal in short, sharp shocks." The review by Tim Klingbiel on Australian music website FasterLouder noted that from "seething political references to prophetic statements about the environment. Red Barked Tree deals with a range of subjects in a magnificently compelling and thought provoking way", adding that the record "serves as an indication that Wire have returned to form in a massive way, and remain just as relevant today as they were 35 years ago". By contrast, longtime music critic Robert Christgau remarked in a two-star review, "Even formalists get the grays, well – especially formalists." AllMusic reviewer "j. poet" considered the album "another strong effort", but commented, "While Wire is still making music that shatters expectations, after 30 years they're sounding a lot like the mainstream rockers they once despised." Mojo placed the album at number 48 on its list of the "Top 50 Albums of 2011". Classic Rock reviewer John Doran awarded the album 8 points out of 10 and defined it as "yet another post-80s success of Wire."

== Track listing ==
All tracks are written by Wire.

No.	Title	Length
1.	"Please Take"	3:50
2.	"Now Was"	2:23
3.	"Adapt"	2:51
4.	"Two Minutes"	2:00
5.	"Clay"	3:12
6.	"Bad Worn Thing"	3:33
7.	"Moreover"	4:34
8.	"A Flat Tent"	2:15
9.	"Smash"	3:55
10.	"Down to This"	4:56
11.	"Red Barked Trees"	5:34

Bonus EP Strays

No.	Title	Length
1.	"Boiling Boy" (original studio version from A Bell Is a Cup... Until It Is Struck, 1988)	6:23
2.	"German Shepherds" (original studio version from It's Beginning To And Back Again, 1989)	4:31
3.	"He Knows" (previously unrecorded)	4:42
4.	"Underwater Experiences" (a live recording was included on the Document and Eyewitness live album, 1981)	2:16

Strays was recorded in November 2010 at Resident Studios in London and performed by Wire, augmented by guitarists Matthew Simms and Margaret Fiedler McGinnis.

== Personnel ==
Adapted from the album liner notes.

Wire

- Colin Newman – vocals, guitar, various, mixing
- Graham Lewis – bass, vocals, various
- Robert Grey – drums

Production

- Sean Douglas – engineer (at Resident Studios)
- Andy Ramsay – engineer (at Press Play Studios)
- Denis Blackham – mastering
- Jon Wozencroft – art direction, photography
- Jannis Kounellis – cover image (Untitled, 2010)

== Charts ==
Chart (2011)	Peak position
US Heatseekers Albums (Billboard)	49
