= Nocturnal Koreans =

Studio album by Wire
- Released: 22 April 2016
- Recorded: 2014–2015
- Studios: Rockfield Studios outside Rockfield, Monmouthshire, Wales, UK; Brighton Electric, Brighton, England, UK; Swim studio, London, England, UK
- Genres: Post-punk; art punk; alternative rock
- Length: 25:55
- Label: Pinkflag (PF23CD / PF23LP)
- Producer: Colin Newman

Wire chronology
Wire (2015)	Nocturnal Koreans (2016)	Silver/Lead (2017)

Nocturnal Koreans is a mini-album and the fifteenth studio album by British post-punk band Wire. It was released on 22 April 2016 through the band's own Pinkflag label.

Professional ratings
Aggregate scores
Source	Rating
AnyDecentMusic?	7.4/10
Metacritic	78/100
Review scores
Source	Rating
AllMusic	4/5 stars
The Arts Desk	3/5 stars
Consequence of Sound	B−
The Guardian	4/5 stars
The Irish Times	4/5 stars
The Line of Best Fit	7.5/10
Monsters and Critics	3.5/5 stars
Pitchfork	7/10
PopMatters	7/10
Spin	8/10
TeamRock	4/5 stars
Under the Radar	8.5/10

== Background ==
The album grew out of tracks initially recorded for Wire's self-titled 2015 album. At that time, the band had recorded a total of 19 tracks, 11 of which were selected for WIRE.

In a press release for the album, however, guitarist and singer Colin Newman, drew a distinction between the material selected for WIRE and that for Nocturnal Koreans: “The WIRE album was quite respectful of the band, and Nocturnal Koreans is less respectful of the band—or, more accurately, it’s the band being less respectful to itself—in that it’s more created in the studio, rather than recorded basically as the band played it, which was mostly the case with WIRE. A general rule for this record was: any trickery is fair game, if it makes it sound better.”

== Accolades ==
On 21 April 2016, Stereogum named Nocturnal Koreans their album of the week.

Publication	Accolade	Year	Rank	Ref.
The Quietus	Albums of the Year 2016	2016	94	

== Track listing ==
No.	Title	Lyrics	Music	Length
1.	"Nocturnal Koreans"	Graham Lewis	Colin Newman (song) / Wire (music)	2:58
2.	"Internal Exile"	Lewis	Newman (song) / Wire (music)	2:54
3.	"Dead Weight"	Newman	Newman (song) / Wire (music)	3:03
4.	"Forward Position"	Lewis	Newman (song) / Wire (music)	4:50
5.	"Numbered"	Newman	Newman (song) / Wire (music)	2:30
6.	"Still"	Lewis	Newman (song) / Wire (music)	3:29
7.	"Pilgrim Trade"	Lewis	Newman (song) / Wire (music)	3:11
8.	"Fishes Bones"	Lewis	Robert Grey, Lewis, Newman, Matthew Simms (song) / Wire (music)	3:02
Total length:				25:55

== Personnel ==
Adapted from the album liner notes.

Wire

- Colin Newman – vocals [1–7], electric guitar [1–8], baritone electric guitar [3], acoustic guitar [2, 5, 7], keyboards [1–8], mandola [7], beatbox [1], production, engineering, mixing
- Graham Lewis – bass guitar [1–3, 5–8], vocals [3, 4, 8], MS-10 [3, 5], loops [8], inside photography
- Robert Grey – drums [1–3, 5–8], glass [4], percussion [8]
- Matthew Simms – electric guitar [1–8], lap steel guitar [1, 2, 4], acoustic guitar [2], trumpet [2], modular synth [5], piano [8], fx [4]

Production

- Sean Douglas – engineering
- Denis Blackham – mastering
- Jon Wozencroft – art direction, photography

== Charts ==
Chart (2016)	Peak position
Belgian Albums (Ultratop Flanders)	181
UK Albums (Official Charts)	98

== See also ==
- List of 2016 albums
