= Wire (Wire album) =

Studio album by Wire
- Released: 13 April 2015
- Recorded: 2014 at Rockfield Studios outside Rockfield, Monmouthshire, Wales, UK; overdubs added December 2014 at Brighton Electric, Brighton, England, UK; additional recording at Swim Studio, London, England, UK
- Genres: Post-punk; art punk; alternative rock
- Length: 44:01
- Label: Pinkflag
- Producer: Colin Newman

Wire chronology
Change Becomes Us (2013)	Wire (2015)	Nocturnal Koreans (2016)

Wire is the self-titled fourteenth studio album by British post-punk band Wire. It was released on 13 April 2015 through the band's Pinkflag label.

Professional ratings
Aggregate scores
Source	Rating
AnyDecentMusic?	7.4/10
Metacritic	75/100
Review scores
Source	Rating
AllMusic	4/5 stars
The A.V. Club	B
Consequence of Sound	B−
The Guardian	4/5 stars
Mojo	3/5 stars
MusicOMH	4.5/5 stars
Paste Magazine	8.2/10
Pitchfork	7.0/10
PopMatters	7.0/10
Record Collector	3/5 stars

== Background ==
The material on the album is a combination of songs which were written and performed live on tour preceding the recording and material written by Colin Newman just prior to entering the studio. The band chose eleven songs out of nineteen they’d been preparing, and Newman has stated that the band will issue the remaining material in “… a second release, probably early next year.” Although he later confirmed that this material would be released in April 2016 as Read & Burn 04., the subsequent album was instead entitled Nocturnal Koreans.

According to the band's official webpage for the release, Wire is the first time that guitarist Matthew Simms, who joined in 2012, was heavily involved in the creation of album material. Colin Newman said of Simms: "This is the first album where Matt's been involved in the whole process. It would be overstating to say that we're in a Renaissance, but we are definitely getting somewhere, and I think that Matt is very much part of that."

== Track listing ==
No.	Title	Lyrics	Music	Length
1.	"Blogging"	Graham Lewis	Colin Newman (song) / Wire (music)	3:46
2.	"Shifting"	Lewis	Newman (song) / Wire (music)	3:17
3.	"Burning Bridges"	Lewis	Newman (song) / Wire (music)	3:58
4.	"In Manchester"	Lewis	Newman (song) / Wire (music)	2:41
5.	"High"	Lewis	Newman (song) / Wire (music)	1:52
6.	"Sleep-Walking"	Newman	Newman (song) / Wire (music)	7:30
7.	"Joust & Jostle"	Lewis	Newman (song) / Wire (music)	2:12
8.	"Swallow"	Lewis	Newman (song) / Wire (music)	4:17
9.	"Split Your Ends"	Lewis	Newman (song) / Wire (music)	3:30
10.	"Octopus"	Newman	Newman (song) / Wire (music)	3:16
11.	"Harpooned"	Lewis	Newman (song) / Wire (music)	8:23

== Personnel ==
Adapted from the album liner notes.

Wire

- Colin Newman – lead vocals, electric guitar, baritone electric guitar [1, 7, 8, 11], acoustic guitar [1, 2, 8], keyboards, mandola [6], production, engineering, mixing
- Graham Lewis – bass guitar, high bass guitar [3], backing vocals [1, 4, 9, 10], keyboards [6], bass fx [6], vox pop [6]
- Robert Grey – drum kit, water tank [6]
- Matthew Simms – electric guitar, 12-string electric guitar [2, 3, 9], lap steel guitar [3, 6], keyboards [1, 2, 4, 6], modular synth [4–6, 8–10], fx [11], loop [8]

Production

- Sean Douglas – engineering (at Rockfield Studios and Brighton Electric)
- Denis Blackham – mastering
- Jon Wozencroft – art direction, photography

== Charts ==
Chart (2015)	Peak position
Belgian Albums (Ultratop Flanders)	92
UK Albums (Official Charts)	71

== See also ==
- List of 2015 albums
