= First Fits =

Studio album by Fitted
- Released: November 8, 2019
- Recorded: 2017–2018
- Studios: Casa Hanzo, San Pedro, US; The Record Room, Kent, UK; Tip Top Studio, Uppsala, Sweden; Juno Studio, London, UK; BoP Garage, Alskog, Gotland, Sweden; Downtown Rehearsal, Los Angeles, US
- Genre: Alternative rock
- Length: 37:17
- Label: ORG Music

First Fits is the debut album by alternative rock band Fitted, featuring Mike Watt (The Minutemen, Firehose), Graham Lewis (Wire), Matthew Simms (Wire), Bob Lee (The Black Gang).

== Production and release ==
The album was recorded from 2017 to 2018 with Lewis and Watt trading lead vocals. The first single was "Training Pit Bulls For The Navy."

The first two singles, "Training Pitbulls for the Navy" and "The Legend of Lydmar Lucia", preceded the release of the full album.

== Reception ==
Kevin Quinn of Music-News.com gave the album five stars. James Bennett of SLUG Magazine praised the album yet found it difficult to describe saying "Every track is an adventure, and every adventure is full of more twists and turns than could ever be reasonably anticipated." Chattanooga Pulse described it as "a true joy of creation with expansive, genuinely stirring rock numbers."

== Track listing ==
1. "Plug in the Jug" – 8:10
2. "Training Pit Bulls for the Navy" – 5:08
3. "The Legend of Lydmar Lucia" – 5:39
4. "Magically Blessed" – 7:19
5. "The Chunk That Got Chewed" – 4:28
6. "The First Fit" – 6:33

== Personnel ==
- Mike Watt – bass, vocals
- Graham Lewis – bass, synth, vocals
- Matthew Simms – guitar, modular synth, electric organ
- Bob Lee – drums
