= Object 47 =

Studio album by Wire
- Released: 7 July 2008
- Recorded: 2007–2008
- Studios: Swim Studio, London; Metropolis 22, Rotterdam; Ticktop, Sweden
- Genres: Post-punk; experimental rock; dance-rock
- Length: 35:02
- Label: Pinkflag
- Producer: Colin Newman

Wire studio album chronology
| Send (2003) | Object 47 (2008) | Red Barked Tree (2011) |

Object 47 (Object Forty-Seven) is the eleventh studio album by the English post punk band Wire, named so because it is the 47th item in the Wire discography – a methodology harking back to the name of their 1979 album, 154, which was named after the number of concerts they had played to that point. It is the first Wire album without the participation of guitarist Bruce Gilbert. It was released on 7 July 2008 in the UK and on 15 July in the US through the band's own Pinkflag label.

== Background ==
Object 47 was Wire's first studio album since 2003's Send. Recording for the album began in early 2007 at Metropolis 22 in Rotterdam, where the band mainly recorded drum tracks, and continued until early 2008 at guitarist Colin Newman's Swim Studio in London. Concurrently with Object 47, the band also recorded the Read & Burn 03 EP, which was released in November 2007. Between 2003 and 2007, the band had amassed material which was split between the EP and the album. Tracks selected for the EP was material which the departed Bruce Gilbert had been involved with. Bassist Graham Lewis: "We grouped together anything Bruce had had a hand in, or just waved at, and that was Read & Burn 03; then everything else went onto Object 47."

The track "All Fours" features Page Hamilton of American alternative metal band Helmet on guest guitar.

== Critical reception ==
Professional ratings
Aggregate scores
| Source | Rating |
|---|---|
| Metacritic | 77/100 |
Review scores
| Source | Rating |
| AllMusic | 4/5 stars |
| BBC | Favourable |
| Billboard | 4/5 stars |
| Guardian Unlimited | 2/5 stars |
| The Observer | 4/5 stars |
| Pitchfork | (7.5/10) |
| PopMatters | (9/10) |
| Prefix | (9/10) |
| Spin | 4/5 stars |
| The Sunday Times | 4/5 stars |

Many reviewers noted the album's melodic sensibility, with AllMusic writing, "Object 47 highlights Wire's pop credentials, but the band hasn't lost its edge." Stereogum ranked it 12th (out of 15) in their 2015 "Wire Albums from Worst to Best" list, saying that it is "the most normal sounding album from a band interested in being anything but." Despite the album missing "the abstract and artful twist that made Wire's early post-punk records unique," it is "actually pretty good," and with a radio-friendly sound, one of Wire's "catchiest hours."

Guardian Unlimited wasn't impressed, writing, "Wire have consistently proclaimed a dedication to looking forward, yet many of the dance-rock collisions here seem rooted in the late 1980s/early 90s."

== Track listing ==
All tracks are written by Wire.

1. "One of Us" – 3:45
2. "Circumspect" – 3:13
3. "Mekon Headman" – 2:58
4. "Perspex Icon" – 3:16
5. "Four Long Years" – 3:45
6. "Hard Currency" – 3:50
7. "Patient Flees" – 5:23
8. "Are You Ready?" – 4:43
9. "All Fours" – 4:05

== Personnel ==
Wire

- Colin Newman – vocals, guitar, various, recording, mixing
- Graham Lewis – bass, vocals [lead vocals on 3, 8], various, photography
- Robert Grey – drums

Additional musicians

- Page Hamilton – guitar [9] (credited with "feedback storm")

Production

- Frank Lievaart – recording (at Metropolis 22)
- Denis Blackham – mastering
- Jon Wozencroft – art direction
