= Silk Skin Paws =

EP (mini-album) by Wire
- Released: 1988
- Genre: Alternative rock, post-punk, alternative dance
- Length: 18:34
- Label: Mute

Wire EP chronology
Kidney Bingos (1988)	Silk Skin Paws (1988)	Eardrum Buzz (1989)

Professional ratings
Review scores
Source	Rating
Robert Christgau	C+

Silk Skin Paws is an EP by English rock band Wire. It was released in 1988. The cover sticker describes the EP as a "specially priced mini-album for the Wire connoisseur."

== Track listing ==
12" vinyl/CD EP version

1. "Silk Skin Paws (Full Length Version)" (remix by Dave Allen) (4.48)
2. "German Shepherds" (4.44)
3. "Ambitious (Remix)" (5.20)
4. "Come Back in Two Halves (Rerecorded)" (3.41)

7" single version

1. "Silk Skin Paws (7" Remix)"
2. "German Shepherds"
