= Pink Flag =

Studio album by Wire
- Released: 25 November 1977
- Recorded: September–October 1977
- Studio: Advision (London)
- Genres: Punk rock; art punk; post-punk
- Length: 35:26
- Label: Harvest
- Producer: Mike Thorne

Wire chronology
Pink Flag (1977)	Chairs Missing (1978)

Pink Flag is the debut album by the British post-punk band Wire. It was released on 25 November 1977 through Harvest Records. It was produced by Mike Thorne, recorded from September to October, 1977, in Advision Studios, London. The album was acclaimed on release, and has since been highly influential; today it is regarded as a landmark in the development of post-punk music.

== Critical reception ==
Professional ratings
Review scores
Source	Rating
AllMusic	5/5 stars
Christgau's Record Guide	A
The Encyclopedia of Popular Music	4/5 stars
The Great Rock Discography	8/10
MusicHound Rock	5/5 stars
Pitchfork	10/10
Q	5/5 stars
The Rolling Stone Album Guide	5/5 stars
Sounds	5/5 stars
Spin Alternative Record Guide	10/10
Uncut	5/5 stars

Reviewing in 1978 for The Village Voice, Robert Christgau called Pink Flag a "punk suite", praised its "simultaneous rawness and detachment" and detected a rock-and-roll irony similar to but "much grimmer and more frightening" than the Ramones. In a 1978 Trouser Press review, Ira Robbins said that "Wire [push] minimalism to new heights" and that the band "dredges up images of...beat poetry--short fragments of impressions set to music." He further said that the 21 tracks are "not songs...There's no easy structure or meter. Each explores or describes or electrifies or challenges. There's no easy listening ... I can't say this is an enjoyable album. Maybe it's just a stupid bit of rubbish. But you won't know unless you find out."

In a retrospective review, Steve Huey of AllMusic opined that Pink Flag was "perhaps the most original debut album to come out of the first wave of British punk" and also "recognizable, yet simultaneously quite unlike anything that preceded it. Pink Flag's enduring influence pops up in hardcore, post-punk, alternative rock, and even Britpop, and it still remains a fresh, invigorating listen today: a fascinating, highly inventive rethinking of punk rock and its freedom to make up your own rules." Retrospectively, Trouser Press called the album "a brilliant 21-song suite" in which the band "manipulated classic rock song structure by condensing them into brief, intense explosions of attitude and energy, coming up with a collection of unforgettable tunes". Pitchfork writer Joe Tangari summarized the album as "a fractured snapshot of punk alternately collapsing in on itself and exploding into song-fragment shrapnel."

== Legacy ==
Although the album has received acclaim, it was not a big seller. It was listed at number 412 on Rolling Stone's list of The 500 Greatest Albums of All Time in 2012 – jumping up to number 310 in its 2020 edition – and at number 378 in NME's list of the same name in 2013. Music journalist Stuart Maconie described it as "extraordinary" by the standards of the time at which it was produced. Pitchfork ranked Pink Flag number 22 in its list "Top 100 Albums of the 1970s". The album was included in Robert Dimery's 1001 Albums You Must Hear Before You Die.

R.E.M. frontman Michael Stipe cited Pink Flag as an influence, and R.E.M. covered "Strange" on its 1987 album Document. The Britpop band Elastica were influenced by Wire; they used a riff similar to that of "Three Girl Rhumba" for their song "Connection". Graham Coxon of Blur cited Pink Flag as an influence on his eighth studio album, A+E. Hüsker Dü bassist Greg Norton listed Pink Flag as one of his three favorite punk albums.

== Track listing ==
Credits adapted from the 2018 Special Edition. (Note: The songwriting credits for Pink Flag have been modified on all reissues since 2006. All tracks were originally credited to Bruce Gilbert, Graham Lewis, Colin Newman and Robert Gotobed, except "Different To Me", which was credited to Annette Green.) All music written by Colin Newman, except where noted. All lyrics written by Graham Lewis, except where noted.

Side one
No.	Title	Lyrics	Length
1.	"Reuters"		3:03
2.	"Field Day for the Sundays"		0:28
3.	"Three Girl Rhumba"	Newman	1:23
4.	"Ex Lion Tamer"		2:19
5.	"Lowdown"		2:26
6.	"Start to Move"		1:13
7.	"Brazil"		0:41
8.	"It's So Obvious"		0:53
9.	"Surgeon's Girl"	Newman	1:17
10.	"Pink Flag"		3:45
Total length:			17:28

Side two
No.	Title	Lyrics	Music	Length
11.	"The Commercial"	instrumental	Lewis	0:49
12.	"Straight Line"	Bruce Gilbert	Gilbert; Newman	0:44
13.	"106 Beats That"			1:12
14.	"Mr. Suit"	Newman		1:25
15.	"Strange"	Gilbert	Gilbert; Newman	3:59
16.	"Fragile"			1:18
17.	"Mannequin"			2:37
18.	"Different to Me"	Annette Green		0:43
19.	"Champs"			1:46
20.	"Feeling Called Love"	Newman		1:28
21.	"12 X U"	Gilbert; Lewis		1:57
Total length:				17:58 35:26

== Personnel ==
Credits adapted from the liner notes of the 2018 Special Edition.

Wire

- Bruce Gilbert – guitar, sleeve concept
- Robert Gotobed – drums
- Graham Lewis – bass guitar, backing vocals, sleeve concept
- Colin Newman – vocals, guitar, backing vocals

Additional personnel and production

- Kate Lukas – flute on "Strange"
- Dave Oberlé – backing vocals on "Mannequin"
- Mike Thorne – production, piano on "Reuters", backing vocals on "Reuters" and "Mr. Suit", flute arrangement on "Strange", electric piano on "Options R"
- Paul Hardiman – engineer
- Ken Thomas – assistant engineer
- David Dragon – art direction
- Annette Green – front and back cover photography
- Richard Bray – back cover photography
- Lynda House – back cover photography
- Tim Chacksfield – project co-ordination (1994 reissue)
- Phil Smee – packaging (1994 reissue)
- Denis Blackham – remastering (2006 and 2018 reissue)
- Jon Wozencroft – art direction (2018 reissue)
- Jon Savage – liner notes (2018 reissue)
- Graham Duff – liner notes (2018 reissue)
