= It Hugs Back =

English indie rock/dream pop band

it hugs back
- Origin: England
- Genres: Indie rock, dream pop
- Years active: 2009–present
- Labels: 4AD, Safe and Sound
- Members: Matthew Simms; Jack Theedom; Will Blackaby; Paul Michael

It Hugs Back (stylized as it hugs back) is an English indie rock and dream pop band featuring Wire guitarist Matthew Simms.

== History ==
Schoolmates guitarist Matthew Simms and bassist Paul Michael formed their first band at age twelve. Keyboardist/guitarist Jack Theedom and drummer Will Blackaby joined the band after all four graduated from university.

Their debut album, Inside Your Guitar, was released in 2009 on 4AD. Their second album, Laughing Party, was released in 2012 on Safe and Sound. Recommended Record followed in 2013 and Slow Wave, their most recent album, was released in 2015.

== Discography ==
- Slow Wave (2015)
- Recommended Record (2013)
- Laughing Party (2012)
- Inside Your Guitar (2009)
