= The Ideal Copy =

Studio album by Wire
- Released: April 1987
- Recorded: November–December 1986 (mixed January 1987)
- Studios: Hansa Tonstudio, Berlin, West Germany
- Genres: Post-punk; alternative rock; alternative dance; electronic
- Length: 34:39 (LP); 63:18 (CD)
- Labels: Mute; Enigma (North America)
- Producer: Gareth Jones

Wire studio album chronology
154 (1979)	The Ideal Copy (1987)	A Bell Is a Cup (1988)

Singles from The Ideal Copy
- 1. "Ahead" Released: March 1987

The Ideal Copy is the fourth studio album by the English rock group Wire, released in April 1987 by Mute Records. It was the first full-length recording following the band's hiatus of 1980–1985 (The band had also recorded and released the Snakedrill EP in 1986 after reuniting). The Ideal Copy peaked at number 87 in the UK albums chart.

== Background ==
Wire had used electronic instruments on the albums Chairs Missing (1978) and 154 (1979), but following their hiatus, Wire more openly embraced the use of sequencers, synthesisers, and drum machines. This prompted music critics to compare The Ideal Copy to groups such as New Order. One critic, Kirk Fillmore, further compared the electric bass's sound on the single "Ahead" to that of New Order's Peter Hook, though bassist Graham Lewis had played in such a style on previous Wire albums. Indeed, journalist Richard Grabel pointed out that "New Order and any number of other synths-and-guitars bands took cues from late-70s Wire," suggesting that "things [had] come full circle."

In May 1988, The Ideal Copy became the first popular music recording to be commercially released on DAT format.

== Album title ==
The phrase "the ideal copy" is repeated throughout the song "Ambitious." Graham Lewis, in a Creem interview, stated "the ideal copy" ultimately refers to DNA, "but Bruce [Gilbert] had a dream about it and decided we had to take that out of the song".

== Lyrical content ==
Typical of Wire, the album's lyrics include a wide range of cultural references.

"Madman's Honey" refers to mad honey, honey produced by bees using pollen from grayanotoxin-containing plants, particularly Rhododendron, produced traditionally in Nepal and the Black Sea region of Turkey. The song also includes references to Nemrut Dağı, a mountain in Turkey with a rich archaeological history (including colossal statues of Greek and Persian deities and a tomb complex dating to the first century BCE), the ancient Turkish settlement of Urfa, and the fishpond at Balıklıgöl in neighboring Harran. The line "Master, cut the stone out, my name is Lubbert Das", is taken from Cutting the Stone, also called The Extraction of the Stone of Madness or The Cure of Folly, a painting by Hieronymus Bosch completed around 1500.

The tracks, "Up to the Sun" (previously released on the Snakedrill EP), and its live version, "Vivid Riot of Red", are a partial performance of an incantation against jaundice from the late Vedic scripture, the Atharvaveda:

Up to the sun shall go thy heart-ache and thy jaundice: in the colour of the red bull do we envelop thee!
We envelop thee in red tints, unto long life. May this person go unscathed, and be free of yellow colour!
The cows whose divinity is Rohini, they who, moreover, axe (themselves) red (róhinih)-(in their) every form and every strength we do envelop thee.
Into the parrots, into the ropanâkâs (thrush) do we put thy jaundice, and, furthermore, into the hâridravas (yellow wagtail) do we put thy jaundice.

— Atharvaveda I, 22, Hymns of the Atharva-Veda, Translated by Maurice Bloomfield, in The Sacred Books of the East, Max Muller, ed.

== Critical reception ==
Professional ratings
Review scores
Source	Rating
AllMusic	3/5 stars
Christgau's Record Guide	B−
Encyclopedia of Popular Music	4/5 stars
The Great Rock Discography	7/10
MusicHound	3.5/5
Rolling Stone	(Not Rated)
The Rolling Stone Album Guide	3/5 stars
Spin Alternative Record Guide	6/10

AllMusic said the album was a "stunning comeback picking up where 154 left off while also reflecting the strides made by the members' solo work" and that the album was "experimental and forward-thinking". Trouser Press felt that, "for the first time, Wire no longer sounded ahead of its time: New Order had already done this sort of thing better." And while the album has its moments of tunefulness, they wrote, "mechanical sameness is no substitute for the old diversity."

Stereogum ranked it 6th (out of 15) in their 2015 "Wire Albums from Worst to Best" list, writing, "what mostly defines the album is the updated, late '80s sheen that blankets every song, and with mostly satisfying results ... Glossy, in this case, doesn't necessarily denote commercial, however, and one dynamite single ["Ahead"] doesn't stop Wire from making the rest of the album uniquely – and accessibly – weird. As peculiar and sometimes frustrating as Wire's second act would become, it certainly started out strong."

== Track listing ==
All titles are written by Wire (Graham Lewis, Colin Newman, Bruce Gilbert and Robert Gotobed).

No.	Title	Length
1.	"The Point of Collapse"	3:18
2.	"Ahead"	4:53
3.	"Madman's Honey"	4:23
4.	"Feed Me"	5:50
5.	"Ambitious"	4:00
6.	"Cheeking Tongues"	2:02
7.	"Still Shows"	4:00
8.	"Over Theirs"	5:18

Bonus tracks

In addition to the eight album tracks, the compact disc and cassette configurations appended the Snakedrill EP in its entirety, along with three concert recordings.

No.	Title	Length
9.	"A Serious of Snakes" (from Snakedrill, 1986)	4:53
10.	"Drill" (from Snakedrill)	5:05
11.	"Advantage in Height" (from Snakedrill)	3:05
12.	"Up to the Sun" (from Snakedrill)	2:50
13.	"Ambulance Chasers" (live) (from "Ahead" 12" single, 1987)	3:02
14.	"Feed Me" (live) (from "Ahead" 7" single)	4:27
15.	"Vivid Riot of Red" (live) (from "Ahead" 12" single)	2:28

The UK CD edition on Mute Records (CD STUMM 42), in addition to the eight album tracks, appends a different version of "Ahead", as well as the Snakedrill EP and the three concert recordings.

No.	Title	Length
9.	"Ahead (II)"	3:29
10.	"A Serious of Snakes"	4:42
11.	"Drill"	5:03
12.	"Advantage in Height"	3:02
13.	"Up to the Sun"	2:42
14.	"Ambulance Chasers" (live)	2:55
15.	"Feed Me" (live)	4:28
16.	"Vivid Riot of Red" (live)	2:22

Notes

- The Snakedrill EP was recorded in summer 1986 at The Strongroom, London, UK and released in November 1986.
- Live tracks recorded 19 October 1986 at Metropol, Berlin, West Germany.

== Personnel ==
Wire

- Colin Newman – voice, guitar, various
- Lewis – voice, bass guitar, various
- B. C. Gilbert – guitar
- Robert Gotobed – drums, various

Production

- Gareth Jones – production, engineer
- Andre Giere – assistant engineer
- John Fryer – mixing (live tracks)
- Graham Lewis (credited as "Sven") – front cover image
