= Fitted =

Alternative rock supergroup

- Years active: 2017–present
- Label: Org Music
- Members: Mike Watt; Graham Lewis; Matthew Simms; Bob Lee

Fitted (stylized as FITTED) is an alternative rock band featuring Mike Watt (The Minutemen, Firehose), Graham Lewis (Wire), Matthew Simms (Wire), and Bob Lee (The Black Gang). Graham Lewis' Wire was one of the influences for Mike Watt's Minutemen.

Initially formed as a one-off group for Wire's Drill festival in Los Angeles, the four decided to record an album.

Their debut album, First Fits, was recorded from 2017 to 2018 with Lewis and Watt trading lead vocals. The first single was "Training Pit Bulls for the Navy". James Bennett of SLUG Magazine praised the album yet found it difficult to describe saying "Every track is an adventure, and every adventure is full of more twists and turns than could ever be reasonably anticipated." Chattanooga Pulse described it as "a true joy of creation with expansive, genuinely stirring rock numbers".

== Discography ==
- First Fits (Org Music, 2019)
