= Change Becomes Us =

Studio album by Wire
- Released: 25 March 2013
- Recorded: 2012
- Studios: Rockfield Studios, Monmouth, Wales, UK; Swim Studio, London, England, UK
- Genres: Post-punk; art punk; alternative rock
- Length: 48:45
- Label: Pinkflag
- Producer: Colin Newman

Wire chronology
Red Barked Tree (2011)	Change Becomes Us (2013)	Wire (2015)

Professional ratings
Aggregate scores
Source	Rating
Metacritic	78/100
Review scores
Source	Rating
AllMusic	4/5 stars
Consequence of Sound	3.5/5 stars
The Fire Note	4/5 stars
Pitchfork	(8.2/10)
PopMatters	(8/10)
Spin	(8/10)

Change Becomes Us is the thirteenth studio album by British post-punk band Wire. It was released on 25 March 2013 through the band's own label, Pinkflag. It is the first studio album to feature guitarist Matthew Simms, who initially joined Wire as a touring guitarist in 2010.

== Album information ==
The album features songs based on ideas from 1979/1980 that were originally quick sketches for live performances. In particular, "Doubles and Trebles", "Keep Exhaling", "Reinvent Your Second Wheel", "Stealth of a Stork", "Time Lock Fog", "Eels Sang", "Love Bends", "& Much Besides" and "Attractive Space" are reworked versions of "Ally in Exile", "Relationship", "ZEGK HOQP", "Witness to the Fact", "5/10", "Eels Sang Lino", "Piano Tuner (Keep Strumming Those Guitars)", "Eastern Standard" and "Underwater Experiences" respectively, which originally appeared on the 1981 live album Document and Eyewitness; similarly, "B/W Silence", "Magic Bullet", "Adore Your Island" and "As We Go" revise "Lorries", "Over My Head", "The Spare One" and "Part of our History", each of which were compiled on Turns and Strokes. The material underwent radical changes in the general process of working on it, with arrangements, lyrics and even the music being changed in many songs, or only a small part of the original remaining. Wire's Colin Newman called it "a wholesale rewriting of texts, as there was a wholesale rewriting of tunes, vocal melodies."

Newman has stated that there were four main sources for the material: Document and Eyewitness, the Legal Bootleg Series, home demos, and "stuff that came out of my head." In its embryonic form, "Doubles and Trebles" was based on the earlier song "Ally in Exile," which had already been brought back into the fold in 2000 and turned it into another song, "I Don’t Understand," on 2002's Read & Burn 01 EP. On "Love Bends," 10 seconds of intro was taken from "Piano Tuner (Keep Strumming Those Guitars)", while the rest of the song is new. "As We Go", musically, is an entirely new song to anyone outside of Newman. "Re-invent Your Second Wheel" reuses the lyrics from "ZEGK HOQP" in its chorus with completely new music. "ZEGK HOQP" was an attempt to use all the letters of the alphabet in a song. "Eels Sang"–originally "Eels Sang Lino"– is made entirely out of anagrams. The original title is an anagram of "in Los Angeles".

Newman has called recording the album "a slightly absurd and nonsensical exercise," saying, "That was almost the raison d'être: "Let's do this because it's the most stupid thing we could imagine doing." And also do it in a way which is not about recreating the past in any way, because that would be anathema to the band. So, as we went into the process, it became more and more absurd, and then it started to make more sense, and then it just became the new album, through this weird process. But it was never intended to be."

The basic recording for the album was made during one week in spring 2012 at Rockfield Studios in Wales with overdubs and mixing taking place at Newman's London studio over a six-month period. Change Becomes Us was made available on CD and digital on 25 March, followed by a special edition on vinyl on 20 April 2013 (Record Store Day). Also released was a special limited-edition of the CD as a hard-backed book featuring documentation of the story of the album with studio photographs and the complete lyrics.

The album cover is a photograph of the red hallway in Seattle's Central Library.

== Track listing ==
No.	Title	Lyrics	Music	Origin	Length
1.	"Doubles & Trebles"	Graham Lewis	Colin Newman (song) / Wire (music)	"Ally in Exile"	3:50
2.	"Keep Exhaling"	Lewis	Newman (song) / Wire (music)	"Relationship"	1:39
3.	"Adore Your Island"	Lewis	Newman (song) / Wire (music)	"The Spare One"	2:45
4.	"Re-Invent Your Second Wheel"	Lewis	Lewis, Newman (song) / Wire (music)	"Zegk Hoqp"	3:45
5.	"Stealth of a Stork"	Lewis	Newman (song) / Wire (music)	"Witness to the Fact"	1:54
6.	"B/W Silence"	Lewis	Newman (song) / Wire (music)	"Lorries"	4:40
7.	"Time Lock Fog"	Lewis	Newman (song) / Wire (music)	"5/10"	5:45
8.	"Magic Bullet"	Lewis	Newman (song) / Wire (music)	"Over My Head"	3:41
9.	"Eels Sang"	Lewis	Lewis, Newman (song) / Wire (music)	"Eels Sang Lino"	2:15
10.	"Love Bends"	Lewis	Newman (song) / Wire (music)	"Piano Tuner"	4:01
11.	"As We Go"	Lewis	Newman (song) / Wire (music)	"Part of Our History"	4:36
12.	"& Much Besides"	Newman	Newman (song) / Wire (music)	"Eastern Standard"	6:13
13.	"Attractive Space"	Lewis	Newman (song) / Wire (music)	"Underwater Experiences (Chairs Missing version)"	3:33

== Personnel ==
Adapted from the special edition liner notes.

Wire

- Colin Newman – lead vocals [1–3, 5–8, 10–13], electric guitar [1–6, 8–13], Mellotron [1–12], baritone electric guitar [1, 4, 7, 11], acoustic guitar [1, 6], organ [2, 3, 8, 10, 12], piano [4, 9], mandolin [7], bass guitar [9], guitar fx [9], backing vocals [1, 6], handclaps [5], production, mixing
- Graham Lewis – bass guitar [1–8, 10–13], lead vocals [4, 9], baritone electric guitar [8], piano [12], Monotron [12], handclaps [5]
- Robert Grey – drums [1–5, 8–13], cymbals [6], floor percussion [7, 12], bottle [7], radiator [7], handclaps [5]
- Matthew Simms – electric guitar [1–13], guitar fx [7, 9, 10, 13], Mellotron [11, 13], acoustic guitar [12], twelve-string guitar [12], handclaps [5]

Production

- Sean Douglas – engineer (at Rockfield Studios)
- Denis Blackham – mastering
- Jon Wozencroft – art direction, photography

== Charts ==
Chart (2013)	Peak position
Belgian Albums (Ultratop Flanders)	165
US Heatseekers Albums (Billboard)	23
