= A Bell Is a Cup =

A Bell Is a Cup... Until It Is Struck

Studio album by Wire
- Released: May 1988
- Recorded: December 1987; Live tracks recorded 1 December 1987 at the Town and Country Club, London, with the Manor Mobile
- Studios: Preußen Tonstudio, Berlin, West Germany
- Genres: Post-punk; alternative rock; electronic
- Length: 44:11 (LP); 70:19 (CD)
- Labels: Mute, Enigma
- Producer: Gareth Jones

Wire studio album chronology
| The Ideal Copy (1987) | A Bell Is a Cup... Until It Is Struck (1988) | It's Beginning To And Back Again (1989) |

A Bell Is a Cup... Until It Is Struck is the fifth studio album by the British post-punk group Wire.

== Critical response ==
Professional ratings
Review scores
| Source | Rating |
|---|---|
| AllMusic | 4.5/5 stars |
| Christgau's Record Guide | B+ |
| Encyclopedia of Popular Music | 2/5 stars |
| The Great Rock Discography | 5/10 |
| MusicHound | 2.5/5 |
| NME | 9/10 |
| Rolling Stone | 4/5 stars |
| The Rolling Stone Album Guide | 2.5/5 stars |
| Spin Alternative Record Guide | 5/10 |

In 1989, the Trouser Press Record Guide described the album as "a stylized set of dreamscapes and consciousness streams... It's arguably Wire's most ruminative album, and while immersion in it won't, as 'Silk Skin Paws' suggests, 'wring your senses' – that's more a job for Chairs Missing – it will twirl your lobes a time or two." However, in a later edition, Trouser Press held a more critical view, writing "Wire stayed the dance-pop course with diminishing results on A Bell Is a Cup."

At the time of the album's release, Wire faced accusations that they had abandoned their earlier rough-edged sound for a softer, more refined style. Graham Lewis dismissed such criticism:

This is a fallacy... When [Wire's early albums] were released, they were considered more polished than other records at the time. Every record that's been made, the same criticism of being less abrasive has been levelled at it. The abrasion is actually in the content – both lyrics and sound.

AllMusic gave the album a laudatory review, describing the record as "arguably Wire's best album and certainly its most accessible... a work of modern rock genius."

== Cover art ==
The sculpture shown is the Selene horse from the Parthenon Marbles.

== Track listing ==
All tracks published by Stainless Music.

All tracks are written by Wire.

| No. | Title | Length |
|---|---|---|
| 1. | "Silk Skin Paws" | 4:53 |
| 2. | "The Finest Drops" | 5:01 |
| 3. | "The Queen of Ur and the King of Um" | 4:03 |
| 4. | "Free Falling Divisions" | 3:39 |
| 5. | "It's a Boy" | 4:26 |
| 6. | "Boiling Boy" | 6:22 |
| 7. | "Kidney Bingos" | 4:12 |
| 8. | "Come Back in Two Halves" | 2:43 |
| 9. | "Follow the Locust" | 4:22 |
| 10. | "A Public Place" | 4:30 |

The CD version appends the following tracks:

| No. | Title | Length |
|---|---|---|
| 11. | "The Queen of Ur and the King of Um" (alternative version) | 4:02 |
| 12. | "Pieta" | 7:29 |
| 13. | "Over Theirs" (live) | 6:36 |
| 14. | "Drill" (live) | 8:01 |

== Personnel ==
Wire

- Bruce Gilbert
- Robert Gotobed
- Graham Lewis (credited as "Lewis")
- Colin Newman

Production

- Gareth Jones – production
- David Heilmann – engineer
- Paul Davis – front of house engineer [13, 14]
- Simon Hardiman – stage monitor engineer [13, 14]
- Ifan Thomas – backline [13, 14]
- Slim Smith – layout
