= Document and Eyewitness =

Live album by Wire
- Released: July 1981
- Recorded: Electric Ballroom, London, 29 February 1980; Notre Dame Hall, London, 19 July 1979; Le Pavillon, Montreux, 9 March 1979
- Genre: Punk rock; post-punk; experimental rock
- Length: 68:43
- Label: Rough Trade

Wire live album chronology
Document and Eyewitness (1981)	It's All in the Brochure (2000)

Alternative cover
- 1991 Mute CD reissue

Alternative cover
- 2014 Pinkflag CD reissue

Document and Eyewitness is the first live album by the post-punk band Wire, released in July 1981 by Rough Trade Records. It marked the end of the first period of Wire's activity (1977–1980) and the end of their association with EMI. Recorded in February 1980 at the Electric Ballroom in London – at the final gig of Wire's first period – the original release came with a 45 rpm 12" EP that featured recordings from a July 1979 show at the Notre Dame Hall in London, along with one track from a March 1979 gig at Le Pavillon in Montreux, Switzerland.

The Electric Ballroom show records Wire after the release of 1979's 154 album, who were no longer interested in playing previous material and were stylistically progressing forward. Of the seven songs from the Notre Dame Hall show, three were never recorded in-studio by Wire and the rest were captured as B-sides and other ephemeral recordings. Nine of the songs recorded live for the album were reworked and recorded for the band's 2013 album Change Becomes Us. Three songs would also surface on Colin Newman's solo albums, and one would be recorded by Graham Lewis and Bruce Gilbert for their Dome project.

== Background ==
The Electric Ballroom show demonstrates Wire creating a surreal and challenging show that not only included almost all new material, but also a Dadaist cabaret including a moving 6'x12' sheet behind which the band performed, assorted headdresses and props, and an MC, Wire's manager Mick Collins, who tried to keep control of proceedings. The show was performed before a restive punk crowd who were little appeased by a version of "12XU" (edited down to a 15-second fragment for this release) and reacted with a thrown bottle during the unnamed instrumental. The recording was made on an eight-track tape recorder that was set up incorrectly, resulting in a distorted two-track mix. The live version of "Heartbeat" was recorded in Montreux, when Wire supported Roxy Music on the continental leg of their Manifesto Tour.

Colin Newman has stated that the idea of Document and Eyewitness "was to make it an art statement, as opposed to just releasing a rubbishly recorded gig." In his book Read and Burn: A Book About Wire, Wilson Neate wrote that the album was consequently not presented as a standard live album, that the band was "undercutting the illusion of the live moment with after-the-fact commentary and observations on the night's occurrences." The spoken commentary between selected tracks by two Wire fans, Adrian Garston and Russell Mills, constitutes the "eyewitness" in the album title.

== Album cover ==
The album's sleeve art, created by Graham Lewis, is a cut-up version of a poster made by Bruce Gilbert for two shows that Wire played at Notre Dame Hall on 19 and 20 July 1979. Recordings from the first of these two shows make up most of sides three and four of Document and Eyewitness.

== Releases ==
The original vinyl release by Rough Trade was a double with the Electric Ballroom tracks on sides one and two, and the Notre Dame Hall and Montreux tracks on sides three and four. The 1991 compact disc reissue by Mute Records switched the running order, beginning with Notre Dame and Montreux and following with the Electric Ballroom tracks. "Our Swimmer" and "Midnight Bahnhof Cafe" were originally released on Rough Trade as a 7" single (RT79) in 1981 and are bonus tracks on Mute's CD reissue. In 2014, the band's label Pinkflag released a new version of the album, which revises the original track list of the album and also includes a bonus disc, this disc also including the original CD bonus tracks. The release was remastered from the original tapes.

== Critical reception ==
Professional ratings
Aggregate scores
Source	Rating
Metacritic	63/100
Review scores
Source	Rating
AllMusic	2/5 stars
Robert Christgau	B
Dusted Magazine	4/5 stars
Louder Than War	9/10
Pitchfork Media	6.0/10
PopMatters	3/10
Prog	(mixed)
Record Collector	3/5 stars
The Wire	3.5/5 stars
Wireviews	(mixed)

In a 1982 review for Trouser Press, Alec Ross said, "there are high spots," but "[t]his live stuff...is just boring–a meandering parody of what made Wire intriguing." Robert Christgau, in his "Consumer Guide" column, wrote, "At first I diagnosed the grungy sound and semipro execution of this live LP-plus-EP as the band's worst case of arty-farty yet. But for all the chatter and false starts and extended instrumental nothings, it packs real momentum–you could even say it gets wild."

The album is included in The Quietus' 2013 list of its writers' "40 Favourite Live Albums".

== Track listing ==
All tracks are written by Bruce Gilbert, Robert Gotobed, Graham Lewis and Colin Newman, except where noted.

=== Original vinyl release ===
Side one

1. "5/10" M.C.'s request spot – 5:30
2. "12 X U (Fragment)" – 2:16
3. "Underwater Experiences" – 2:39
4. "Everythings Going to Be Nice" (Lewis) Woman enters pulling 2 tethered men and an inflatable jet – 1:05
5. "Piano Tuner (Keep Strumming Those Guitars)" Vocalist attacks gas stove – 5:19
6. "We Meet Under Tables" (Newman) Vocalist wears black knee length veil – 3:30

Side two

7. "Zegk Hoqp" 12 percussionists with newspaper head dresses – 5:00
8. "Eastern Standard" M.C. attempts geographical explanation – 3:03
9. "Instrumental (Thrown Bottle)" – 2:11
10. "Eels Sang Lino" Vocalist accompanied and lit by illuminated goose – 3:05
11. "Revealing Trade Secrets" – 2:34
12. "And Then..." (Gilbert, Lewis) Vocalist eats 2 loaves and then blank scrolls are unrolled – 4:50
13. "Coda" – 4:09

=== 45 rpm 12" ===
Side three

1. "Go Ahead" – 4:00
2. "Ally in Exile" – 4:19
3. "Relationship" – 1:20
4. "Underwater Experiences" – 2:41

Side four

5. "Witness to the Fact" – 2:50
6. "2 People in a Room" (Gilbert, Newman) – 1:52
7. "Our Swimmer" – 3:00
8. "Heartbeat" (Newman) – 3:08

Sides one and two recorded 29 February 1980 at Electric Ballroom, London. Sides three and four recorded 19 July 1979 at Notre Dame Hall, London, except "Heartbeat", recorded 9 March 1979 at Le Pavillon, Montreux.

=== 1991 Mute CD reissue ===
1. "Go Ahead" – 4:00
2. "Ally in Exile" – 4:19
3. "Relationship" – 1:20
4. "Underwater Experiences" – 2:41
5. "Witness to the Fact" – 2:50
6. "2 People in a Room" (Gilbert, Newman) – 1:52
7. "Our Swimmer" – 3:00
8. "Heartbeat" (Newman) – 3:08
9. "5/10" – 5:30
10. "12 X U (Fragment)" – 2:16
11. "Underwater Experiences" – 2:39
12. "Everythings Going to Be Nice" (Lewis) – 1:05
13. "Piano Tuner (Keep Strumming Those Guitars)" – 5:19
14. "We Meet Under Tables" (Newman) – 3:30
15. "Zegk Hoqp" – 5:00
16. "Eastern Standard" – 3:03
17. "Instrumental (Thrown Bottle)" – 2:11
18. "Eels Sang Lino" – 3:05
19. "Revealing Trade Secrets" – 2:34
20. "And Then..... Coda" (Gilbert, Lewis) – 9:01
21. "Our Swimmer" – 3:34 (CD bonus track; non-album single, 1981)
22. "Midnight Bahnhof Cafe" (Lewis, Newman) – 4:33 (CD bonus track; B-side to "Our Swimmer")

Tracks 21 and 22 recorded December 1979 at Magritte Studio, Harmondsworth. Produced by Wire; engineered by Dan Priest.

Note

- Track 20 was listed as two separate tracks on the original vinyl release.

=== 2014 Pinkflag CD reissue ===
Disc one

- As per original vinyl release including EP

Disc two

1. "Our Swimmer" (non-album single) – 3:30
2. "Midnight Bahnhof Cafe" (Lewis, Newman) (B-side to "Our Swimmer") – 4:32
3. "Second Length (Our Swimmer)" (B-side to non-album single "Crazy About Love", 1983) – 2:49
4. "Catapult 30" (B-side to "Crazy About Love") – 5:05
5. "Ally in Exile" (personal demo) – 4:31
6. "Go Ahead" (rehearsal recording) – 5:56
7. "Remove for Improvement" (rehearsal recording) – 2:03
8. "Over My Head" (rehearsal recording) – 4:07
9. "Safe" (rehearsal recording) – 1:58
10. "Relationship" (rehearsal recording) – 1:13
11. "Underwater Experiences" (rehearsal recording) – 2:38
12. "Eels Sang Lino" (rehearsal recording) – 1:41
13. "Cancel Your Order" (rehearsal recording) – 3:07
14. "Part Of Our History (Emerges)" (rehearsal recording) – 14:36

Tracks 1 and 2 recorded December 1979 at Magritte Studio, Harmondsworth; tracks 3 and 4 recorded April–May 1980 at Scorpio Sound, London; track 5 recorded January 1979 in Cadaqués, Spain; tracks 6–14 recorded in 1979 and 1980 in rehearsal rooms in London. Tracks 1–4 produced by Wire; 1 and 2 engineered by Dan Priest; 3 and 4 engineered by Steve Parker.

== Personnel ==
Credits adapted from the 2014 reissue liner notes.

Wire

- Colin Newman – vocals, guitar, bass
- Graham Lewis – bass, vocals, saxophone, keyboards, sleeve design
- Bruce Gilbert – guitar, bass, poster image
- Robert Gotobed – drums, percussion, saxophone

Additional personnel

- David Quinn – occasional saxophone
- Geoff Travis – compilation
- Wire – compilation
