= Tramps! =

2022 Canadian documentary film

- Directed by: Kevin Hegge
- Written by: Kevin Hegge
- Produced by: Kevin Hegge; Brian Robertson
- Cinematography: Jack Reynolds
- Edited by: Neil Cavalier
- Music by: Kat Duma; Verity Susman; Matthew Simms
- Production company: Low End
- Distributed by: Bohemia Media; Game Theory Films
- Release date: March 26, 2022 (BFI Flare)
- Running time: 104 minutes
- Country: Canada
- Language: English

Tramps! is a Canadian documentary film, directed by Kevin Hegge and released in 2022. The film is a portrait of the New Romantic scene, including Duggie Fields and Judy Blame, that emerged in the United Kingdom in the late 1970s and early 1980s.

== Release ==
The film premiered as the closing gala film at BFI Flare in 2022, and had its Canadian premiere at the Inside Out Film and Video Festival.

== Reception ==
Kat Duma, Verity Susman and Matthew Simms received a Canadian Screen Award nomination for Best Original Music in a Documentary at the 12th Canadian Screen Awards in 2024.

In 2024, Nadine Whitney of InSession Film said "(B+) It’s a little misty eyed for her and her nostalgia for a seemingly golden period. Austerity is back and life is elsewhere again...Tramps! reminds the audience that there are those who will never Fade to Grey."
