= Silver/Lead =

Studio album by Wire
- Released: 31 March 2017
- Recorded: 2016
- Studios: Rockfield Studios outside Rockfield, Monmouthshire, Wales, UK; Swim studio, London, England, UK
- Genres: Post-punk, art punk, alternative rock
- Length: 36:09
- Label: Pinkflag PF24CD / PF24LP / PF24SE
- Producer: Colin Newman

Wire chronology
Nocturnal Koreans (2016)	Silver/Lead (2017)	Mind Hive (2020)

Silver/Lead is the sixteenth studio album by British post-punk band Wire. It was released on 31 March 2017.

Professional ratings
Aggregate scores
Source	Rating
AnyDecentMusic?	7.1/10
Metacritic	77/100
Review scores
Source	Rating
The Arts Desk	4/5 stars
The A.V. Club	C+
DIY Magazine	4/5 stars
The Guardian	4/5 stars
Lincoln Journal Star	8.5/10 stars
Paste	8.9/10
Pitchfork	7.1/10
PopMatters	8/10 stars
The Quietus	4/5 stars
The Times	3/5 stars

== Background ==
Silver/Lead was conceived to arrive in conjunction with the fortieth anniversary of Wire's first gig as a four-piece band on 1 April 1977 at The Roxy in London (there had been three previous gigs with a fifth member, George Gill, earlier that year). In recalling the occasion, singer-guitarist Colin Newman remarked, "It struck me in 2013 that the first of April, 2017, was going to be the 40th anniversary of the first proper Wire gig. And I thought, 'Well, should we do something about it or should we not?' But – and this partly comes from fine art, partly from pop culture – there's this idea of a narrative. People like a story. They like to connect the dots somehow." The album was recorded both at Newman's own home studio and at Rockfield Studios in Monmouth, a studio Newman claims is well-suited for Wire because "there is not much else to do there."

Wire announced the impending release of Silver/Lead on their website on 17 January 2017, describing the music on the album as "a uniquely addictive 21st century psychedelic post-punk" that was "about as far from nostalgia as you could get." The album was released in four different form factors: a standard CD, a digital download, a vinyl version, and a special limited-edition CD/hard-backed book box featuring text by Graham Duff, interviews, and exclusive color photographs.

The band released two streaming singles off of the album prior to the full release. The first single, "Short Elevated Period", was released on 23 January 2017 on NPR Music. Bob Boilen, writing for NPR, describes the track as "music that looks at the present and forward to the future, still with its artful guitar driven snap, all the more surprising for a band that didn't look like it would make it past the three-year mark." The second single, “Diamonds In Cups”, was released for streaming on Stereogum on 28 February 2017. Stereogum's Kim Ilkowski wrote that the song "[features] some exceptional guitar work that takes you up and down on a blissful, bouncing ride."

== Track listing ==
All lyrics are written by Graham Lewis; all music is composed by Colin Newman except where noted.

Silver/Lead track listing
No.	Title	Composer(s)	Length
1.	"Playing Harp for the Fishes"	Lewis, Wire	3:44
2.	"Short Elevated Period"		2:54
3.	"Diamonds in Cups"		4:09
4.	"Forever & a Day"	Lewis, Wire	4:07
5.	"An Alibi"		3:10
6.	"Sonic Lens"		4:31
7.	"This Time"	Lewis, Wire	4:17
8.	"Brio"		3:37
9.	"Sleep on the Wing"		3:00
10.	"Silver/Lead"		2:40

== Personnel ==
Wire

- Colin Newman – lead vocals (2, 3, 5, 6, 8–10), electric guitar, keyboards, acoustic guitar (5, 6, 8, 10), 12-string guitar (3), mandola (8), M-Tron baritone (7), fx (10), production, mixing
- Graham Lewis – bass guitar, lead vocals (1, 4, 7), backing vocals (2, 3, 8), Casio SK-1 (8), loops and samples (1, 4, 8), cover image
- Robert Grey – drums
- Matthew Simms – electric guitar (1–7, 9, 10), lap steel (8), mandola (2), modular synth 5, 7), Korg MS-10 (1, 3, 6), fx (4, 6), autoharp (8)

Production

- Tim Lewis – engineering
- Jeroen Melchers – engineering
- Denis Blackham – mastering
- Jon Wozencroft – art direction

== Charts ==
Chart (2017)	Peak position
Belgian Albums (Ultratop Flanders)	124
Belgian Albums (Ultratop Wallonia)	143
UK Albums (Official Charts)	96

== See also ==
- List of 2017 albums
