= Matthew Simms =

English guitarist

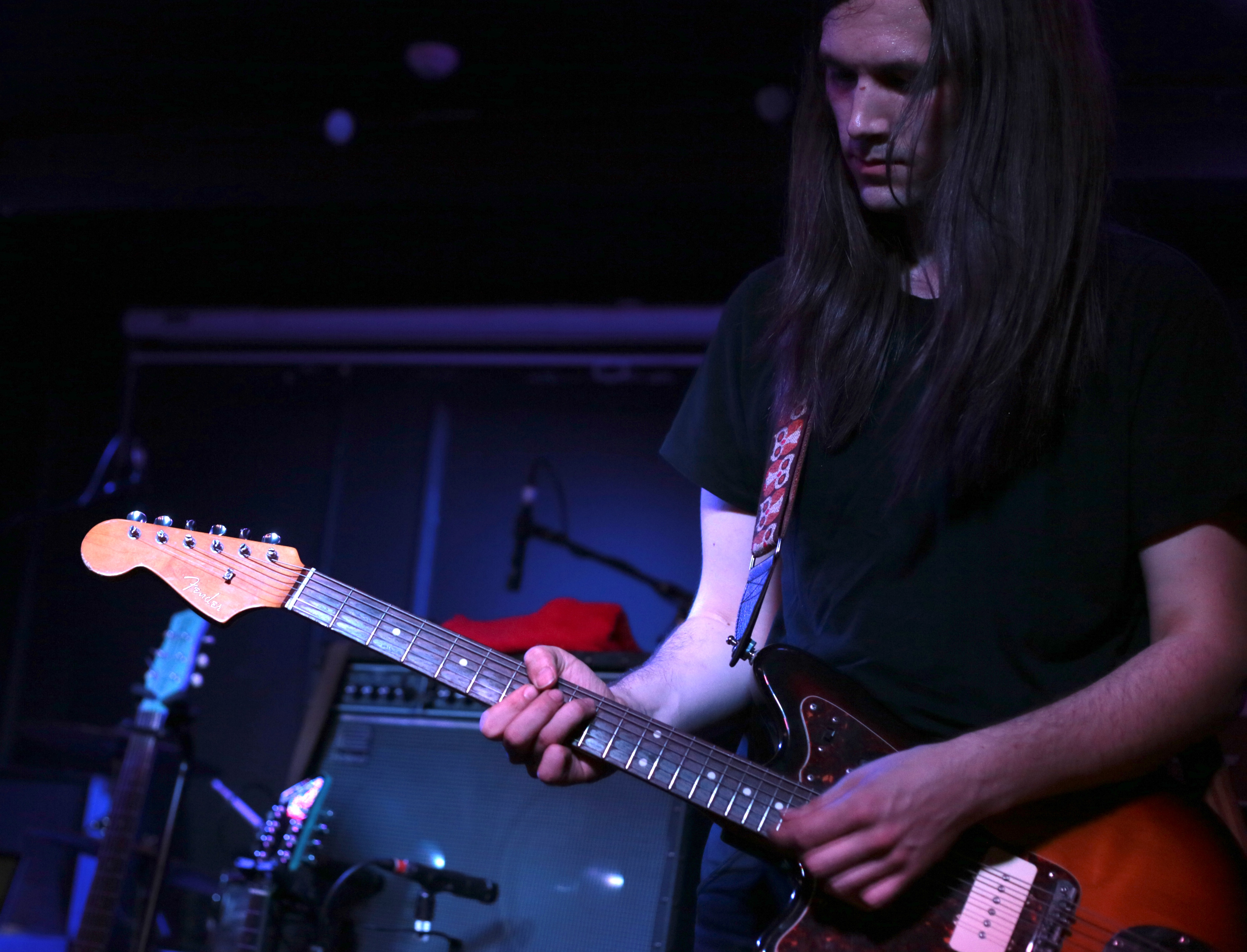
- Simms performing with Wire in 2013

Background information
- Origin: England
- Genres: Post-punk; experimental rock; electronic; alternative rock
- Occupation: Guitarist
- Instruments: Guitar; organ
- Labels: Pink Flag; ORG Music

Matthew Simms is an English guitarist best known for his work with the band Wire.

Simms formed the band It Hugs Back with schoolmates Paul Michael, Jack Theedom and Will Blackaby. Their debut album, Inside Your Guitar, was released in 2009. Their second album, Laughing Party, was released in 2012.

In 2010 Simms joined Wire for their Red Barked Tree tour initially as a touring guitarist but then as a full member of the band. The first Wire album Simms appeared on was 2013's Change Becomes Us. He went on to appear on: Wire, Nocturnal Koreans, Silver/Lead, and Mind Hive (2020).

Since joining Wire Simms has balanced his work with both Wire and It Hugs Back.

With fellow Wire-mate Graham Lewis Simms joined bassist Mike Watt (Minutemen) and drummer Bob Lee to form FITTED. Initially formed as a one-off group for Wire's DRILL festival in Los Angeles, the four decided to record an album.

First Fits, their debut album, was recorded from 2017 to 2018 with Lewis and Watt trading lead vocals. "Training Pit Bulls For The Navy" was the first single.

Simms also records solo work under the pen name "Slows", an experimental electronic project in which Simms plays electric organ. He performed at London South Bank University at their inaugural Magnetic South festival in April 2016.

Simms, Verity Susman and Kat Duma received a Canadian Screen Award nomination for Best Original Music in a Documentary at the 12th Canadian Screen Awards in 2024 for their work on Tramps!.

Simms and Susman formed the band MEMORIALS in 2022, having previously collaborated and worked on film soundtrack projects together. The duo officially launched MEMORIALS around their 2023 film scores of Tramps! and Women Against The Bomb. They later signed to Fire Records for their albums Memorial Waterslides (2024) and All Clouds Bring Not Rain (2026).
