= Manscape =

Studio album by Wire
- Released: 15 May 1990
- Recorded: 1989–1990
- Studios: RAK Studios, London; Worldwide Studios, London; Mixed at RAK Studios, London and Konk Studios, London
- Genres: Alternative dance; post-punk
- Length: 63:26 (CD); 48:55 (LP)
- Labels: Mute (UK); Restless (US)
- Producer: David M. Allen

Wire studio album chronology
It's Beginning To And Back Again (1989)	Manscape (1990)	The Drill (1991)

Singles from Manscape
- 1. "Life in the Manscape" Released: May 1990 (US)

Alternative cover
- Vinyl version cover

Manscape is the seventh studio album by the British post-punk group Wire, released in May 1990 by Mute Records. It was produced by David M. Allen, mostly recorded and mixed at RAK Studios, engineered by Roy Spong, and published by Dying Art Ltd.

== Background ==
Manscape saw Wire exploring electronica more deeply than on previous works. Bass and drums were mostly sequenced, and a 1990 UK and European tour saw the band performing live without drummer Robert Gotobed. They played mostly new material from the LP, as well as a few older songs reworked to fit the electronic instrumentation. The rise and evolution of dance music informed the record, while lyrically it remained part cut-up and part obliquely referential.

"The Morning Bell" is about the British public school system, while "Small Black Reptile" is about the political system. The record's centrepiece, "You Hung Your Lights in the Trees/A Craftsman's Touch", spans over ten minutes. Bassist Graham Lewis's wife, Liv Elvander, co-wrote the lyrics for "What Do You See?".

"Life in the Manscape", which was recorded at Worldwide Studios after the album sessions at RAK Studios, was added to the CD version of the album when the RAK sessions had failed to produce a single. The track was released as the album's only single.

The original vinyl release has a significantly different running order and omits "Life in the Manscape", "Stampede" and "Children of Groceries".

== Critical reception ==
Professional ratings
Review scores
Source	Rating
AllMusic	2/5 stars
Entertainment Weekly	B+

In a contemporary review, Entertainment Weekly wrote that the music is "wonderfully crafted, amounting to a textbook in evocative synthesizer sound. It's expressive, too, oscillating between pain and meditations. No matter what discomfort the lyrics might indicate, the music is strangely beautiful." On release the NME's Stuart_Maconie said "Mostly though, 'Manscape' is an idiosyncratic triumph.", giving it a 7 out of 10. AllMusic's retrospective review said, "taken for what it is, Manscape is edgy, brainy dance music, but taken as part of the largely brilliant Wire oeuvre, it's a disappointment." Trouser Press thought the album was soulless and called it "Wire's absolute nadir."

In their 2015 "Wire Albums from Worst to Best" list, Stereogum ranked it 14th out of 15, writing, "There are flashes of intriguing material, like "Sixth Sense" ... "Small Black Reptile" is a fun slice of atmospheric pop, and "Torch It" even approaches Nine Inch Nails, if Trent Reznor sounded like a more distinguished British punk. But beyond these few highlights, so much of the album gets lost in meandering MIDIscapes that remove both the edge and the character from the band's songwriting. Add to that the slap-bass keyboard patches and flanger-heavy fuzz guitar, and for all of the things that Manscape does right, it's still an album that sounds hopelessly trapped in the early '90s."

== Track listing ==
All tracks written by Bruce Gilbert, Robert Gotobed, Graham Lewis and Colin Newman, except as indicated.

1. "Life in the Manscape" – 3:28
2. "Stampede" – 4:35
3. "Patterns of Behaviour" – 4:33
4. "Other Moments" – 3:50
5. "Small Black Reptile" – 3:14
6. "Torch It!" – 7:31
7. "Morning Bell" – 4:22
8. "Where's the Deputation?" – 3:51
9. "What Do You See?" (Liv Elvander, Gilbert, Gotobed, Lewis, Newman) – 6:47
10. "Goodbye Ploy" – 3:50
11. "Sixth Sense" – 4:19
12. "Children of Groceries" – 3:03
13. "You Hung Your Lights in the Trees/A Craftsman's Touch" – 10:03

UK Vinyl Version (Mute STUMM 80)

1. "Patterns of Behaviour" – 4:16
2. "Goodbye Ploy" – 3:47
3. "Morning Bell" – 4:19
4. "Small Black Reptile" – 3:12
5. "Torch It!" – 7:25
6. "Other Moments" – 3:47
7. "Sixth Sense" – 4:18
8. "What Do You See? (Welcome)" (Elvander, Gilbert, Gotobed, Lewis, Newman) – 6:46
9. "Where's the Deputation?" – 3:46
10. "You Hung Your Lights in the Trees / A Craftsman's Touch" (edited) – 7:19

== Personnel ==
Wire

- Colin Newman
- Graham Lewis
- Bruce Gilbert
- Robert Gotobed

Production

- David M. Allen – production
- Roy Spong – engineer on [2–13] (at RAK Studios)
- Paul Kendall – engineer on [1] (at Worldwide Studios)
- Joe Gibb – engineer on [1] (at Konk Studios)
- Jon Wozencroft – design
- Neville Brody – design
