= Kidney Bingos =

Song by Wire

from the album A Bell Is A Cup
- Released: 1988
- Studio: Preussen Tonstudio, Berlin (tracks 1 and 3); 1 December 1987 at Town and Country Club, London, England (tracks 2 and 4)
- Genre: Alternative rock
- Label: Mute
- Producer(s): Gareth Jones

Professional ratings
Review scores
Source	Rating
Rolling Stone	2/5 stars
Allmusic	No Rating
Hard Report	No Rating

"Kidney Bingos" is a single/EP by English post punk band Wire. It was released in 1988 and is taken from the album A Bell Is A Cup.

The track peaked at number 88 on the UK Singles Chart in March 1988.

== Track listing ==
All tracks are written by Wire.

No.	Title	Length
1.	"Kidney Bingos" (mixed by Daniel Miller)	4:13
2.	"Over Theirs"	6:36
3.	"Drill"	8:04
4.	"Pieta"	1:14

== Personnel ==
Production

- Paul Davis – engineer
- Simon Hardiman – engineer
- David Heilmann – engineer
- Gareth Jones – engineer
