= It's Beginning To And Back Again =

Studio album by Wire
- Released: 30 May 1989
- Recorded: June–December 1988
- Studios: Kitsch, Brussels, Belgium; Terminal 24, London, UK
- Genres: Alternative rock; electronic; experimental rock; experimental pop
- Length: 47:37 (LP); 59:43 (CD)
- Labels: Mute; Enigma (North America)
- Producers: Paul Kendall; John Fryer; Wire

Wire studio album chronology
A Bell Is a Cup (1988)	It's Beginning To And Back Again (1989)	Manscape (1990)

Singles from It's Beginning To And Back Again
- 1. "Eardrum Buzz" Released: April 1989; 2. "In Vivo" Released: July 1989

It's Beginning To And Back Again, also known by its acronym IBTABA, is the sixth studio album by the British post-punk group Wire, released in May 1989 by Mute Records.

The title of the album derives from the lyrics of the third song, "German Shepherds". Half of the album consists of reinterpretations of live performances of material from the band's previous record, A Bell Is a Cup...Until It Is Struck. The recordings are "based on performances in Chicago, Portugal and London." Live tracks were deconstructed in the studio and remixed by Wire. The album contains the single "Eardrum Buzz", which was the band's most successful single in their history, charting at No. 2 on the Billboard Modern Rock Tracks chart and No. 68 in the UK.

== Recording ==
Wire started recording It's Beginning To And Back Again in November 1988 at Kitsch Studios in Brussels, Belgium. The sessions would last one month and included live recordings from June and October 1988, taped at the Metro in Chicago and Pavilhão do Belenenses in Lisbon. Instead of cleaning up the live recordings for release, Wire started from scratch, overdubbing new instruments and removing crowd noise. The exercise was to explore the 'live album' form. Wire's Colin Newman has explained that the band "took the recordings from the Metro in Chicago and Lisbon and took off everything but the drums and vocals, and played along to it, playing everything else again. The concept was that it was a band doing 'a remix-by-playing'."

The album includes alternate versions of five tracks originally released on Wire's previous two albums; plus "German Shepherds", which had been released in June 1988 as the B-side to the "Silk Skin Paws" single; and the previously unreleased "Eardrum Buzz" and "Illuminated". Since the project was unlikely to produce any chart-bound tracks, Mute Records' Daniel Miller had asked the band to record some potential singles, separately from the recording of the album. "Eardrum Buzz" (12" version), "In Vivo" and "The Offer" were therefore recorded at Terminal 24 Studios in London prior to the Brussels sessions and appeared as bonus tracks on the CD release of the album.

== Critical reception ==
Professional ratings
Review scores
Source	Rating
AllMusic	4/5 stars
Robert Christgau	B−
NME	7/10

AllMusic retrospectively gave the album 4 out of 5 stars, writing, "while the record is respectable on its own terms, it's impossible to discern its relevance – neither a true live album nor a remix collection, its original intentions remain lost in the translation." Trouser Press felt that "the studio trickery was more inspired than the music."

Stereogum ranked it 8th (out of 15) in their 2015 "Wire Albums from Worst to Best" list, writing, "As the centerpiece of Wire's second act, IBTABA reaches neither zenith nor nadir, as the band seemingly opts for having fun rather than breaking ground.

== Track listing ==
All tracks written by Bruce Gilbert, Robert Gotobed, Graham Lewis and Colin Newman.

=== Original edition ===
No.	Title	Length
1.	"Finest Drops"	4:28
2.	"Eardrum Buzz"	4:16
3.	"German Shepherds"	4:39
4.	"Public Place"	6:05
5.	"It's a Boy"	3:59
6.	"Illuminated"	6:51
7.	"Boiling Boy"	8:17
8.	"Over Theirs"	9:24

=== CD bonus tracks ===
No.	Title	Length
9.	"Eardrum Buzz" (12" version)	4:15
10.	"The Offer"	2:55
11.	"In Vivo"	4:34

== Personnel ==
Adapted from the album liner notes.

Wire

- Colin Newman
- Graham Lewis
- Bruce Gilbert
- Robert Gotobed

Production

- Paul Kendall – production, engineer, mixing [1–8]
- John Fryer – production, mixing [1–8]
- Wire – production [1–8]
- Rico Conning – engineer, mixing [9–11] (at Terminal 24 Studios)
- Designland – sleeve Layout
