= Chairs Missing =

1978 album by the punk band Wire

Studio album by Wire
- Released: 8 September 1978
- Recorded: May 1978
- Studios: Advision, London, England, UK
- Genres: Post-punk; art punk; avant-pop
- Length: 42:27
- Label: Harvest
- Producer: Mike Thorne

Wire studio album chronology
| Pink Flag (1977) | Chairs Missing (1978) | 154 (1979) |

Singles from Chairs Missing
- 1. "I Am the Fly" Released: 1978; 2. "Outdoor Miner" Released: 1979; 3. "A Question of Degree" Released: 1979

Chairs Missing is the second studio album by the English rock band Wire. It was released on 8 September 1978 through Harvest Records. It uses more developed song structures than the minimalist punk rock of the group's first album. The record was met with widespread critical acclaim.

The album peaked at number 48 in the UK Albums Chart. The single "Outdoor Miner" was a minor hit, peaking at number 51 in the UK singles chart.

== Music ==
Although it features some of the minimalist punk rock of the band's debut Pink Flag, Chairs Missing contains more developed song structure (taking some cues from 1970s prog-rock, psychedelia, and art rock), keyboard and synthesizer elements brought in by producer Mike Thorne, and a broader palette of emotional and intellectual subject matter. The title is said to be a British slang term for a mildly disturbed person, as in "that guy has a few chairs missing in his front room".

The album was released through Harvest Records on 8 September 1978.

== Critical reception ==
Professional ratings
Review scores
| Source | Rating |
|---|---|
| AllMusic | 5/5 stars |
| The Encyclopedia of Popular Music | 4/5 stars |
| The Great Rock Discography | 9/10 |
| MusicHound Rock | 4.5/5 stars |
| Pitchfork | 10/10 |
| Q | 5/5 stars |
| The Rolling Stone Album Guide | 4/5 stars |
| Spin Alternative Record Guide | 9/10 |
| Uncut | 5/5 stars |
| Under the Radar | 8.5/10 stars |

In a 1979 Trouser Press review, Jim Green said, "Wire are disconcerting, laconic yet eloquent in fragmented visions, jarring even at their most accessible. They disdain cliche, pushing out the limits of rock; the easy way is too boring...Their stripped-down rhythms take on the quality of being familiar yet somehow alien, just as their bleak lyrics lift the everyday from its context and illuminate its ironies." Green concluded that "[y]ou have to listen for yourself." The Sandwell Evening Mail wrote that "the songs are sparse, sometimes rather frightening, but often superbly constructed."

In its retrospective review, Steve Huey of AllMusic wrote: "The arty darkness of Chairs Missing, combined with the often icy-sounding synth/guitar arrangements, helps make the record a crucial landmark in the evolution of punk into post-punk and goth, as well as a testament to Wire's rapid development and inventiveness." BBC Music called the album a "glorious avant-pop coup" and (referring to the 2006 edition of the album) "the most satisfying of the three reissues [the others being Pink Flag and 154]." In 2004 Pitchfork listed Chairs Missing as 33rd best album of the 1970s. In 2013 NME listed the album as the 394th greatest album of all time.

== Legacy ==
In 2004 the US record label Words-on-Music released A Houseguest's Wish, a CD tribute album to the band consisting solely of 19 different versions of the Chairs Missing track "Outdoor Miner".

In 2016 Paste named the album as the third-best post-punk release of all time. Their staff writer assessed: "It's hard to imagine 'post-punk' even existing as a genre tag without this record; although a couple of songs recall the minimal, straight-forward punk of Pink Flag, the rest of the album adds synthesisers, guitar effects, a disco beat on 'Another the Letter,' and various other flourishes and experiments that clearly marked this as something new and different at the time. It foreshadowed so much of the punk-derived music that followed that you can draw a straight line from Chairs Missing to a handful of different indie-rock subgenres."

== Track listing ==
Credits adapted from the 2018 Special Edition.

All music written by Colin Newman, except where noted. All lyrics written by Graham Lewis, except where noted.

Side one
| No. | Title | Lyrics | Music | Length |
|---|---|---|---|---|
| 1. | "Practice Makes Perfect" | Bruce Gilbert | | 4:11 |
| 2. | "French Film Blurred" | | | 2:34 |
| 3. | "Another the Letter" | Gilbert | | 1:07 |
| 4. | "Men 2nd" | | Lewis, Newman (Note: The songwriting credits for Chairs Missing have been modified on all reissues since 2006. "Men 2nd" was originally credited to Graham Lewis alone.) | 1:43 |
| 5. | "Marooned" | Gilbert, Lewis | | 2:21 |
| 6. | "Sand in My Joints" | | Lewis | 1:50 |
| 7. | "Being Sucked in Again" | Newman | | 3:14 |
| 8. | "Heartbeat" | Newman | | 3:16 |

Side two
| No. | Title | Lyrics | Music | Length |
|---|---|---|---|---|
| 9. | "Mercy" | | | 5:46 |
| 10. | "Outdoor Miner" | | | 1:44 |
| 11. | "I Am the Fly" | | | 3:09 |
| 12. | "I Feel Mysterious Today" | | | 1:57 |
| 13. | "From the Nursery" | | | 2:58 |
| 14. | "Used To" | Gilbert, Lewis | Gilbert, Newman (Note: "Used To" was originally credited to Bruce Gilbert and Graham Lewis alone.) | 2:23 |
| 15. | "Too Late" | Gilbert | Gilbert, Newman (Note: "Too Late" was originally credited to Bruce Gilbert alone.) | 4:14 |

Bonus tracks
| No. | Title | Lyrics | Music | Length |
|---|---|---|---|---|
| 16. | "Go Ahead" (1989 reissue, single B-side) | | Gilbert, Robert Gotobed, Lewis, Newman | 4:01 |
| 17. | "Outdoor Miner (Long Version)" (1994 reissue, single A-side) | | | 2:54 |
| 18. | "Former Airline" (1989 and 1994 reissues, single B-side) | Gilbert | Gilbert | 3:20 |
| 19. | "A Question of Degree" (1989 and 1994 reissues, single A-side) | | | 3:09 |

*The bonus tracks on the 1989 and 1994 reissues were removed from the 2006 remastered reissue because they, according to the band, didn't honour the "conceptual clarity of the original statements".

=== 2018 Special Edition ===
Disc two (Singles, B-sides, and Studio Recordings)
| No. | Title | Lyrics | Music | Length |
|---|---|---|---|---|
| 1. | "I Am the Fly" (single version A-side) | | | 3:06 |
| 2. | "Dot Dash" (single A-side) | | | 2:24 |
| 3. | "Options R" (single B-side) | | Lewis, Newman (Note: "Options R" was originally credited to Graham Lewis alone.) | 1:35 |
| 4. | "Outdoor Miner" (single version A-side) | | | 2:52 |
| 5. | "Practice Makes Perfect" (single version B-side) | Gilbert | | 4:05 |
| 6. | "Underwater Experiences" (Advision Studios version) | | | 3:32 |
| Total length: | | | | 17:34 |

Disc three (Fourth and Fifth Demo Sessions)
| No. | Title | Lyrics | Music | Length |
|---|---|---|---|---|
| 1. | "Practice Makes Perfect" (Fourth demo session, December 1977, Riverside Studios, London, England) | Gilbert | | 3:46 |
| 2. | "Oh No Not So" (Fourth demo session, December 1977, Riverside Studios, London, England) | | | 1:35 |
| 3. | "Culture Vultures" (Fourth demo session, December 1977, Riverside Studios, London, England) | | | 2:06 |
| 4. | "It's the Motive" (Fourth demo session, December 1977, Riverside Studios, London, England) | | | 1:19 |
| 5. | "Love Ain't Polite" (Fourth demo session, December 1977, Riverside Studios, London, England) | Newman | | 1:06 |
| 6. | "French Film Blurred (Version 1)" (Fourth demo session, December 1977, Riverside Studios, London, England) | | | 1:14 |
| 7. | "Sand in My Joints" (Fourth demo session, December 1977, Riverside Studios, London, England) | | Lewis | 1:49 |
| 8. | "Too Late" (Fourth demo session, December 1977, Riverside Studios, London, England) | Gilbert | Gilbert, Newman | 4:12 |
| 9. | "I Am the Fly" (Fourth demo session, December 1977, Riverside Studios, London, England) | | | 6:00 |
| 10. | "Heartbeat" (Fourth demo session, December 1977, Riverside Studios, London, England) | Newman | | 2:42 |
| 11. | "Underwater Experiences" (Fourth demo session, December 1977, Riverside Studios, London, England) | | | 3:14 |
| 12. | "Stalemate" (Fourth demo session, December 1977, Riverside Studios, London, England) | Newman | | 2:15 |
| 13. | "I Feel Mysterious Today" (Fourth demo session, December 1977, Riverside Studios, London, England) | | | 1:40 |
| 14. | "Dot Dash" (Fifth demo session, April 1978, Riverside Studios, London, England) | | | 2:19 |
| 15. | "French Film Blurred (Version 2)" (Fifth demo session, April 1978, Riverside Studios, London, England) | | | 2:15 |
| 16. | "Options R" (Fifth demo session, April 1978, Riverside Studios, London, England) | | Lewis, Newman | 1:48 |
| 17. | "Finistaire (Mercy)" (Fifth demo session, April 1978, Riverside Studios, London, England) | | | 5:45 |
| 18. | "Marooned" (Fifth demo session, April 1978, Riverside Studios, London, England) | Gilbert, Lewis | | 2:16 |
| 19. | "From the Nursery" (Fifth demo session, April 1978, Riverside Studios, London, England) | | | 2:50 |
| 20. | "Indirect Enquiries (Version 1)" (Fifth demo session, April 1978, Riverside Studios, London, England) | | | 1:42 |
| 21. | "Outdoor Miner" (Fifth demo session, April 1978, Riverside Studios, London, England) | | | 1:43 |
| 22. | "Chairs Missing (Used To)" (Fifth demo session, April 1978, Riverside Studios, London, England) | Gilbert | Gilbert, Newman | 4:09 |
| 23. | "Being Sucked in Again" (Fifth demo session, April 1978, Riverside Studios, London, England) | Newman | | 3:38 |
| 24. | "Men 2nd" (Fifth demo session, April 1978, Riverside Studios, London, England) | | Lewis, Newman | 1:45 |
| 25. | "Another the Letter" (Fifth demo session, April 1978, Riverside Studios, London, England) | Gilbert | | 1:06 |
| 26. | "No Romans" (Fifth demo session, April 1978, Riverside Studios, London, England) | | | 1:12 |
| Total length: | | | | 66:26 |

== Charts ==
| Chart (1979) | Peak position |
|---|---|
| New Zealand Albums (RMNZ) | 41 |

== Personnel ==
Credits adapted from the liner notes of the 2018 Special Edition.

Wire

- Colin Newman – vocals, guitar, backing vocals, arrangement
- Bruce Gilbert – guitar, arrangement, concept
- Graham Lewis – bass, vocals on "Sand in My Joints", backing vocals, arrangement, concept, original sleeve design
- Robert Gotobed – drums, percussion, arrangement

Additional personnel and production

- Kathryn Lukas – flute on "Heartbeat"
- Mike Thorne – production, keyboards, synthesizers, backing vocals on "Being Sucked in Again", arrangement
- Paul Hardiman – engineering
- Ken Thomas – assistant engineering
- Annette Green – photography
- Brian Palmer – art direction
- Tim Chacksfield – project co-ordination (1994 reissue)
- Phil Smee – packaging (1994 reissue)
- Chris Blair – cutting engineering (1994 reissue)
- Andrew Day – design (2006 reissue)
- Denis Blackham – Remastering (2006 and 2018 reissues)
- Nick Glennie-Smith – engineering (disc 3, 2018 reissue)
- Jon Wozencroft – art direction, layout (2018 reissue)
- HQ – layout (2018 reissue)
- Malka Spigel-Newman – photo restoration (2018 reissue)
- Jon Savage – liner notes (2018 reissue)
- Graham Duff – liner notes (2018 reissue)
- Craig Grannell – booklet editor (2018 reissue)
