= Wire (band) =

English rock band

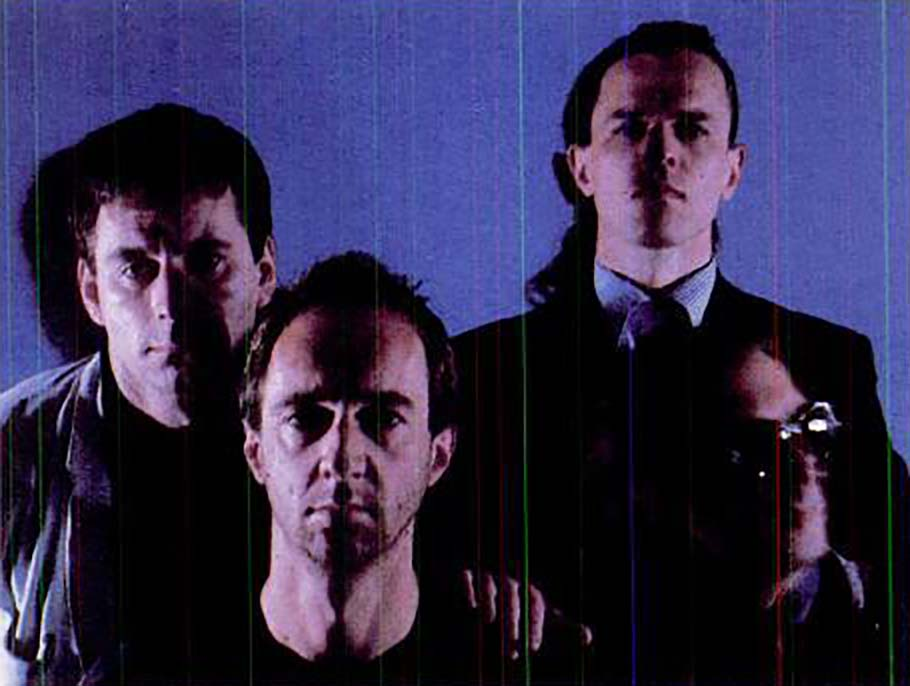
- Wire in 1987. From left: Colin Newman, Robert Grey, Graham Lewis, Bruce Gilbert.

Background information
- Also known as: Wir
- Origin: London, England
- Genres: Post-punk; art punk; punk rock; new wave
- Works: Discography
- Years active: 1976–1980, 1985–1992, 1999–present
- Labels: Pinkflag; Mute; Harvest; Warner Bros.; Rough Trade
- Members: Colin Newman; Graham Lewis; Robert Grey; Matthew Simms
- Past members: George Gill; Bruce Gilbert; Margaret Fiedler McGinnis
- Website: www.pinkflag.com

Wire are an English rock band. They were formed in London in October 1976 by Colin Newman (vocals, guitar), Graham Lewis (bass, vocals), Bruce Gilbert (guitar), George Gill (lead guitar) and Robert Grey (aka Robert Gotobed; drums). They were originally associated with the punk rock scene, appearing on The Roxy London WC2 album, and were instrumental in the development of post-punk, while their debut album, Pink Flag, was influential for hardcore punk.

Wire are regarded as an influential band within the art punk and post-punk genres. Their sound evolved from an early noise rock style into a more complex and atmospheric approach characterized by the increased use of guitar effects and synthesizers, particularly on Chairs Missing (1978) and 154 (1979). Throughout their career the band have been noted for experimentation with song structures and arrangements.

== History ==
=== 1976 to 1980 ===
Wire began as a five-piece band in October 1976. In its early period, guitarist George Gill served as the group's principal songwriter. Following a leg injury that left him unable to perform, Gill departed the band in February 1977. After his departure, the remaining members discontinued most of the material he had written, although several of the band's early songs were later released as demos or included on compilation albums. Wire's debut album, Pink Flag (1977) – "perhaps the most original debut album to come out of the first wave of British punk", according to AllMusic – contains songs that are diverse in mood and style, but most use a minimalist punk approach combined with unorthodox structures. "Field Day for the Sundays", for example, is only 28 seconds long.

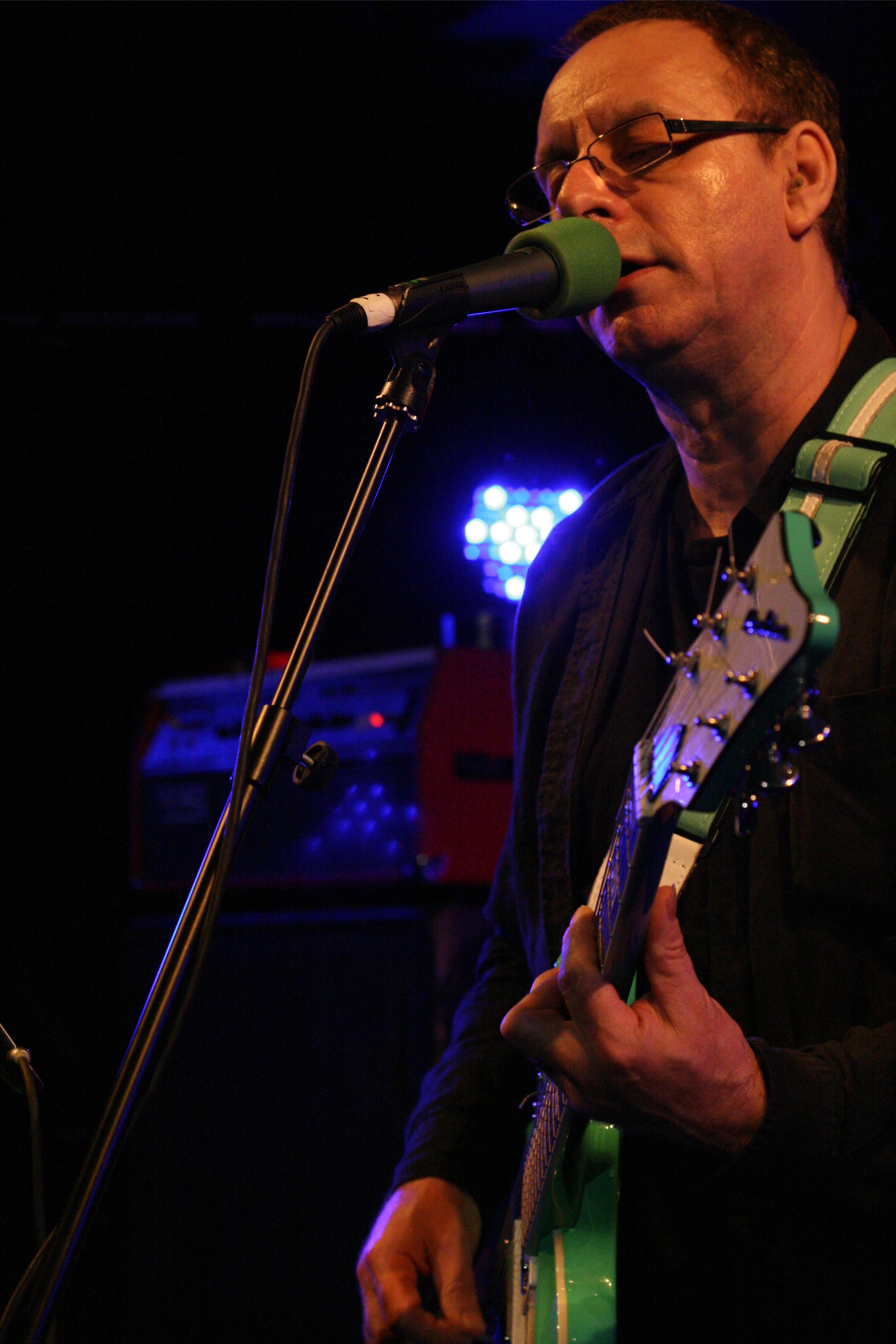
Colin Newman, 2011

"Outdoor Miner"
Sample of "Outdoor Miner", taken from Chairs Missing (1978)

Their second album, Chairs Missing (1978), showed a substantial elaboration of the stark minimalism of Pink Flag, with longer, more atmospheric songs and synthesizer parts added by producer Mike Thorne. "Outdoor Miner" was a minor hit, peaking at number 51 in the UK singles chart. The experimentation was even more prominent on 154 (1979).

Wire's unorthodox ideas to promote 154 led to a falling out with their label. According to Newman, "We'd worked out a sales strategy for 154 that EMI couldn't see at all...They couldn't understand a rock band that wanted to do a week in a theater as an event, and wanted to promote 154 with videos or left-field TV adverts. We wanted to help them sell records; they thought we were simply being intransigent." According to Jim Green in an interview with Newman, "personnel changes at EMI had left Wire without any support." Colin Newman's solo album, "A-Z was planned as the fourth Wire album, but EMI cancelled studio time in the wake of failed negotiations with the band, and then dropped Wire's option."

Lacking a recording deal and money, creative differences split the band in 1979, leading to the Document and Eyewitness LP (1981), a recording of a live performance that featured, almost exclusively, new material. The album was described as "disjointed", "unrecognizable as rock music" and "almost unlistenable". The LP came packaged with an EP of a different performance of more new material. Some of these songs, along with others performed but not included on the album, were included on Newman's post-Wire solo albums (5/10, We Meet Under Tables), while others were released by Gilbert's and Lewis' primary post-Wire outlet Dome (And Then..., Ritual View).

Between 1981 and 1985, Wire ceased recording and performing in favour of solo and collaborative projects such as Dome, Cupol, Duet Emmo and several Colin Newman solo efforts.

=== 1985 to 1992 ===
In 1985, the group re-formed as a "beat combo" (a joking reference to early 1960s beat music), with greater use of electronic musical instruments. Wire announced that they would perform none of their older material, hiring Ex-Lion Tamers (a Wire cover band from Hoboken, New Jersey, named after a song title from Pink Flag) as their opening act for a 1987 U.S. Tour. Ex-Lion Tamers played Wire's older songs, and Wire played their new material.

In June 1988, Wire were part of a lineup that included Orchestral Manoeuvres in the Dark and Thomas Dolby supporting Depeche Mode at the Pasadena Rose Bowl where they played to over 60,000 people. In 1989, Wire released IBTABA, a "live" album of mostly reworked versions of songs from The Ideal Copy and A Bell Is a Cup, heavily rearranged, edited, and remixed. A new song from the album, "Eardrum Buzz", was released as a single and peaked at number 68 in the UK singles chart.

Gotobed left the band in 1990, after the release of the album Manscape. After his departure, the band dropped one letter from its name, becoming "Wir" (still pronounced "wire"), and released The First Letter in 1991. There followed a further period of solo recordings, during which Newman founded the swim ~ label, and later Githead with his wife (ex-Minimal Compact bassist Malka Spigel), while Wire remained an occasional collaboration. It was not until 1999 that Wire again became a full-time entity.

=== 1999 to present ===
With Gotobed back in the line-up (now using his birth name, Robert Grey), the group initially reworked much of their back catalogue for a performance at Royal Festival Hall in 2000. Wire's reception during a short tour in early May of the US, and a number of UK gigs, convinced the band to continue. Two EPs, Read & Burn 01 and Read & Burn 02 were released in 2002. Seven of the tracks from the two EPs were collected with four previously unreleased tracks on the 2003 album, Send. Wire collaborated with stage designer Es Devlin and artists Jake and Dinos Chapman. In 2005, The Scottish Play: 2004, which contained recordings of live performances from this era, was released.

In 2006, Wire's 1970s albums were remastered and re-released with the original vinyl track listings. In 2007, Read & Burn 03 was released. According to Newman, Gilbert featured in a minimal capacity on this EP; Gilbert would no longer feature in Wire after this release. Later, in 2010, Wire would release Send Ultimate which added a bonus disc to the Send album. Send Ultimate collected all the tracks from the first two Read and Burn EPs along with other unreleased material and both sides of the "Twelve Times You" single. A full-length album of new material entitled Object 47 was released in July 2008 with Wire now consisting of three members.

In January 2011, Wire released Red Barked Tree, which according to the band's press release "rekindles a lyricism sometimes absent from Wire's previous work and reconnects with the live energy of performance, harnessed and channelled from extensive touring over the past few years". The album was written and recorded by Newman, Lewis and Grey, but speaking to Marc Riley on the day of the release, Newman introduced as "a new boy" guitarist Matt Simms (from It Hugs Back), who had been a touring member with the band since April 2010.

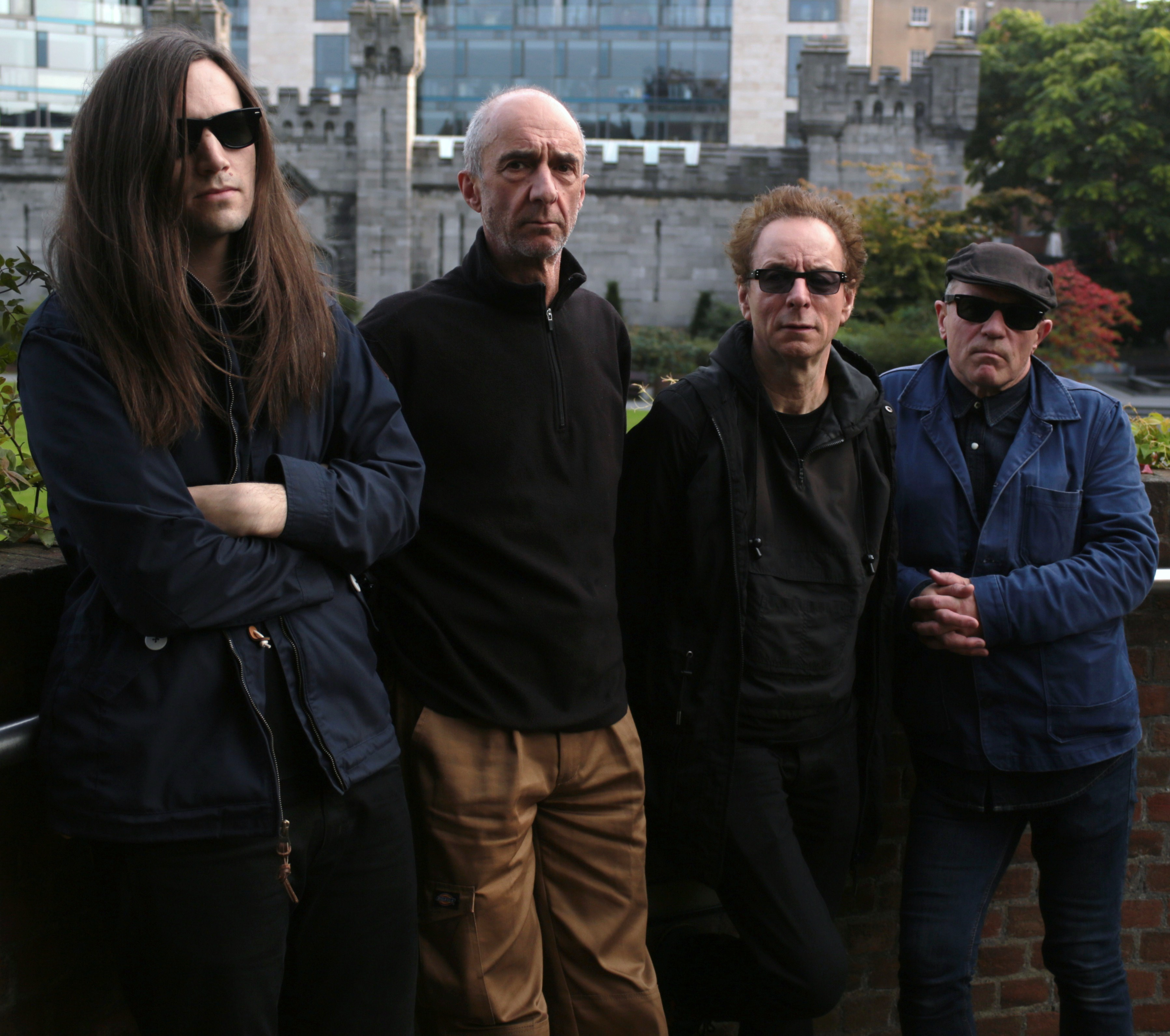
Wire in 2013; left to right: Matthew Simms, Robert Grey, Colin Newman, Graham Lewis

In March 2013 the band released Change Becomes Us, their 13th studio album, which was very well received. Their fourteenth album, eponymously titled Wire, was released in April 2015. The following year, in April 2016, the band's 15th studio album, entitled Nocturnal Koreans, was released on their label Pinkflag. The album consisted of eight songs recorded during the sessions for their previous album which were as of then unreleased. Stereogum named Nocturnal Koreans the Album of the Week. Reviews for the album were mostly positive. In 2017 Wire celebrated 40 years since their debut gig on 1 April 1977 by releasing their 16th studio album, Silver/Lead, and headlining the Los Angeles edition of their DRILL : FESTIVAL.

In 2018, Wire released multi-disc special editions of their first three albums. Each album was housed in a book containing lyrics and other information about the album. The three releases collected non-LP singles and the demo sessions from this era along with remastered versions of the original albums. Also in 2018, Wire released a nine-disc vinyl box set, Nine Sevens, which compiled their first eight singles and the free EP given away with 154. Nine Sevens was rereleased in April 2025 as a double vinyl set as part of Record Store Day.

In January 2020, Wire released Mind Hive on their own Pinkflag label. The band appeared on the front cover of Wire magazine (issue 432) published in January 2020; it featured an interview with the band about the new album and discussed the enduring nature of the group.

On Record Store Day, June 2020, Wire released an eight-song album entitled 10:20. Side one of the vinyl LP consists of four tracks that were originally released as the limited edition Strays EP, which was given away with mail ordered copies of Red Barked Trees. Side two contains four tracks that were recorded during the Mind Hive sessions but not released until their appearance on 10:20.

In June 2021, in conjunction with Record Store Day, Wire released PF456 Deluxe an 18-song vinyl-only compilation of the first two Read and Burn EPs, the "Twelve Times You" single, and the four unreleased tracks from Send. Concurrently, Wire released a CD version of PF456 Redux, a 16-song vinyl-only compilation, originally released in 2003, of edited versions of all the songs from the first two Read and Burn EPs along with the unreleased songs on Send.

In April 2022, in conjunction with Record Store Day, Wire released Not About to Die which was originally released as a bootleg in the early 1980s. The album consists of recordings made for EMI as demos for the 1978 and 1979 albums, Chairs Missing and 154. The songs on Not About to Die were also previously released in 2018 by Wire on the special editions of the two EMI albums.

== Musical style and influences ==
Despite Wire being considered pioneers of post-punk, Newman has denied any association with punk. He has stated: "Wire really never were a punk band... we happened to be there at the same time. You could list the Ramones as one of our influences, but we were never interested in just doing that genre. (...) [T]here's basically two views of Wire: you either think we were not a punk band, or that we were the best punk band ever because we broke every single rule of punk."

In addition to the Ramones, the band have also cited German krautrock and kosmische musik bands such as Neu!, Can and Kraftwerk. Other influences included Roxy Music, Brian Eno, the Velvet Underground, Captain Beefheart, Patti Smith, Television, Syd Barrett's Pink Floyd, Talking Heads, the Stooges, the New York Dolls, Jonathan Richman and Teenage Jesus and the Jerks.

== Legacy ==
Wire's influence has outshone their comparatively modest record sales. In the 1980s and 1990s, Big Black, Minutemen, and Sonic Youth all expressed a fondness for the group. Minutemen bassist Mike Watt described their influence as key, saying of Pink Flag: "I don't know what we would have sounded like if we didn't hear it."

"And the sound was incredible," he continues. "It was like that NYC band Richard Hell and the Voidoids without the studio gimmickry, but Wire was way more 'econo' with the instrumentation and the radical approach to song structure. And the way Wire wrote words were artistic without being elitist; some of the slang was trippy, too. All the 'old' conventions from all the other 'old' bands went out the window after we heard Wire. They were big-time liberating on us."

Wire were influential on American hardcore punk. Fans included Ian MacKaye of Minor Threat and Henry Rollins, formerly of Black Flag. Minor Threat covered "12XU" for the Flex Your Head compilation, as did Boss Hog on their I Dig You EP. Rollins, as Henrietta Collins & The Wife-Beating Childhaters, covered "Ex Lion Tamer" on the EP Drive by Shooting. Michael Azerrad reported, in the book Our Band Could Be Your Life, that at Minor Threat's second gig, each of the seven bands on the roster performed a version of a Wire song.

Robert Pollard once declared Wire's 154 to be "the greatest album of all time", and has stated that "[t]here's always some Wire influence in my stuff." Numerous other bands and artists have cited Wire as an influence, including Soundgarden, Manic Street Preachers, Hüsker Dü, Quicksand, Mission of Burma, Mary Timony, and A Certain Ratio.

Big Black covered Wire's "Heartbeat" twice, once as a studio version that was released as a single (also included on The Rich Man's Eight Track Tape compilation) and also as a live version, featuring Bruce Gilbert and Graham Lewis, included on the VHS version of the live album Pigpile. R.E.M. covered "Strange" on their album Document. My Bloody Valentine covered "Map Ref 41°N 93°W" for the Wire tribute album Whore. The slowcore band Low included an early, previously unreleased cover of "Heartbeat" on their career-spanning box set in 2007. Ampere and New Bomb Turks have both covered Wire's "Mr. Suit". The British electronic band Ladytron included Wire's "The 15th" on the mix compilation Softcore Jukebox. Ladytron member Reuben Wu claimed Wire as a musical influence.

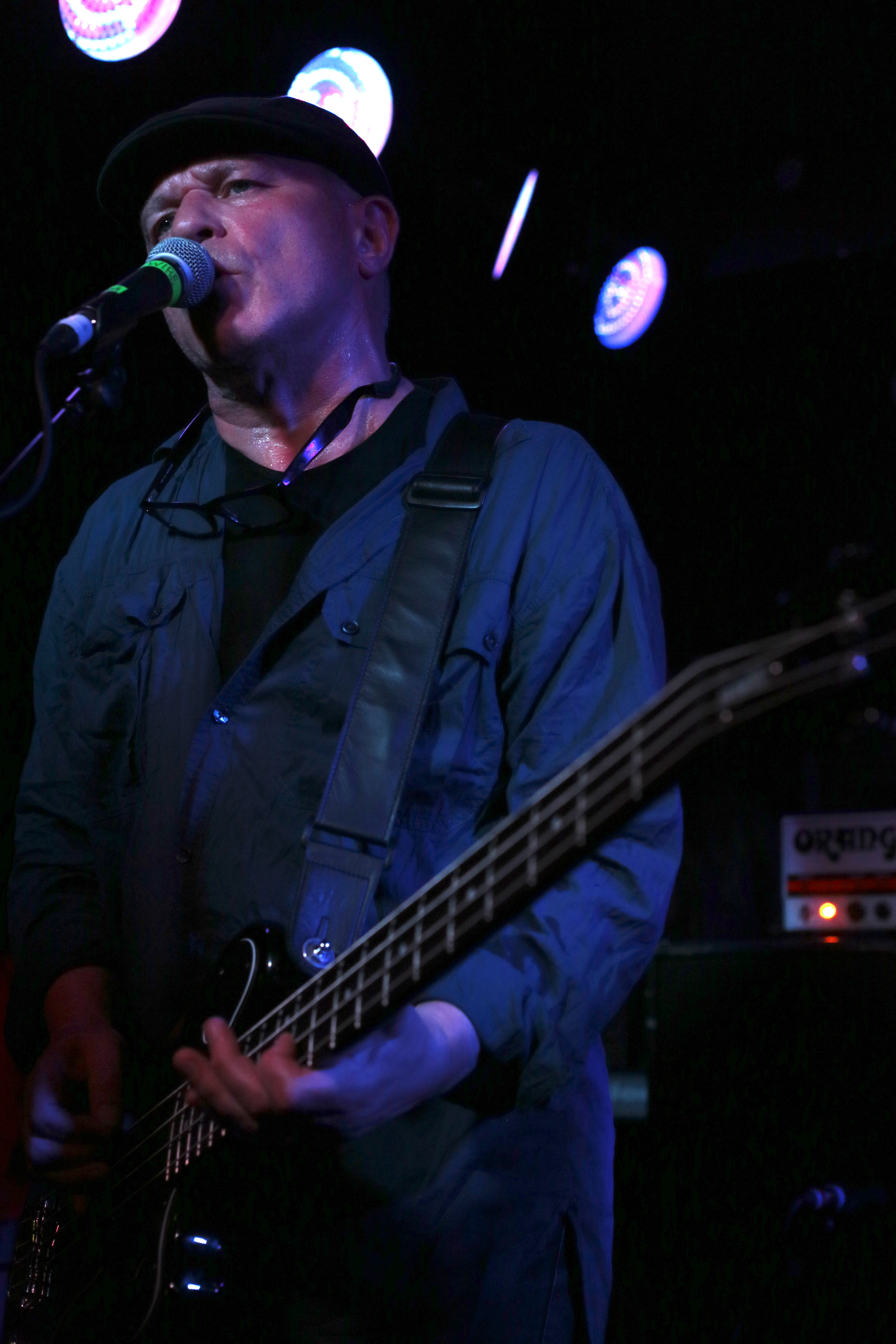
Graham Lewis, 2013

A plagiarism case between Wire's music publisher and Elastica over the similarity between Wire's 1977 song "Three Girl Rhumba" and Elastica's 1995 hit "Connection" resulted in an out-of-court settlement. It has also been noted that two other songs on Elastica's debut album, "Line Up" and "2:1", both borrowed heavily from the Wire song "I Am The Fly".

Alternative Press included Wire in their 1996 list of 100 underground inspirations of the past 20 years, stating that "as long as there are listeners equally lured by tough, intelligent riffs and fearless experimentalism, Wire will remain a crucial benchmark."

Fischerspooner (who covered "The 15th" on their album #1), Britpop bands like Elastica and Menswe@r and post-punk revival bands like Bloc Party, Futureheads, Blacklist and Franz Ferdinand have cited Wire as an influence. The Smiths' Johnny Marr has confirmed that he is a fan of the band and has acknowledged that seeing Wire live helped give him the confidence to release his first solo album in 2013.

The chorus of Ministry's "Thieves" was influenced by the Wire song "Mr. Suit". Helmet guitarist Page Hamilton cites Wire as one of his "top five bands" and as an influence on his music.

== Band members ==
- Colin Newman – vocals, guitar (1976–1980, 1985–1992, 1999–present)
- Graham Lewis – bass guitar, vocals (1976–1980, 1985–1992, 1999–present)
- Robert Grey – drums (1976–1980, 1985–1990, 1999–present)
- Matthew Simms – guitar (2010–present)

Former members

- Bruce Gilbert – guitar (1976–1980, 1985–1992, 1999–2004)
- George Gill – lead guitar (1976–1977)
- Margaret Fiedler McGinnis – guitar (2008–2009 – touring musician)

Timeline

== Discography ==
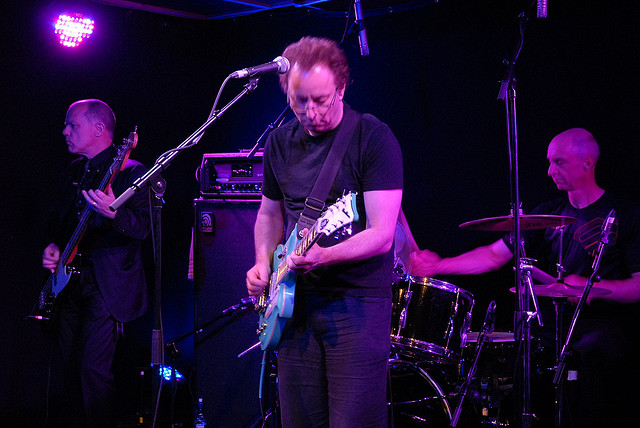
Wire performing in 2008. L to R: Lewis, Newman, Grey.

Studio albums

- Pink Flag (1977)
- Chairs Missing (1978)
- 154 (1979)
- The Ideal Copy (1987)
- A Bell Is a Cup (1988)
- IBTABA (1989)
- Manscape (1990)
- The Drill (1991)
- The First Letter (1991)
- Send (2003)
- Object 47 (2008)
- Red Barked Tree (2010)
- Change Becomes Us (2013)
- Wire (2015)
- Nocturnal Koreans (2016)
- Silver/Lead (2017)
- Mind Hive (2020)
