= Jon Wozencroft =

English graphic designer, author and instructor

Jon Wozencroft (born 1 June 1958, in Epsom, England) is a graphic designer, author and instructor.

Wozencroft founded Touch, an independent multimedia publishing company. Between 1982 and 1986 Touch "released around 15 products, concentrating on producing interactive, audiovisual magazines such as Feature Mist and Touch Travel, both of which sold over 5000 copies without any advertising (which we could not afford)." Touch is still active today.

In 1988 Wozencroft's book on his colleague Neville Brody was published as The Graphic Language of Neville Brody. Wozencroft and Brody went on to found and publish FUSE – an experimental publication of graphics and experimental fonts.

In 1999, Wozencroft released Touch & Fuse, a monograph anthologising his visual work, record sleeves and posters.

In 2012, Wozencroft, together with scholar Paul Devereux, lanched the online research project Landscape & Perception, which resulted from five years of investigations into sound and landscape.

According to his biography, Wozencroft has had extensive experience teaching design. He has been a lecturer at Central St Martins College of Art & Design and at the Royal College of Art, both in London. According to his RCA biography, "In 1994 he was appointed main tutor and assistant course director for MA Interactive Multimedia at the Royal College of Art. He is currently a Senior Tutor on the Visual Communication course at the Royal College of Art."

== Books by Jon Wozencroft ==
- The Graphic Language of Neville Brody, Thames & Hudson Ltd, 1988. (ISBN 978-0500274965)
- The Graphic Language of Neville Brody 2, Thames & Hudson Ltd, 1994. (ISBN 0500277702)
- Touch & Fuse: the aftershock of the invisible, University of Porto, 1999. (Depósito Legal 136162/99)

== Articles by Jon Wozencroft ==
- "Out of the Blue", TATE ETC., Issue 10, Summer 2007. Article on Peter Saville's design for Joy Division's Unknown Pleasures. Text online
