= Robert Grey (musician) =

British drummer

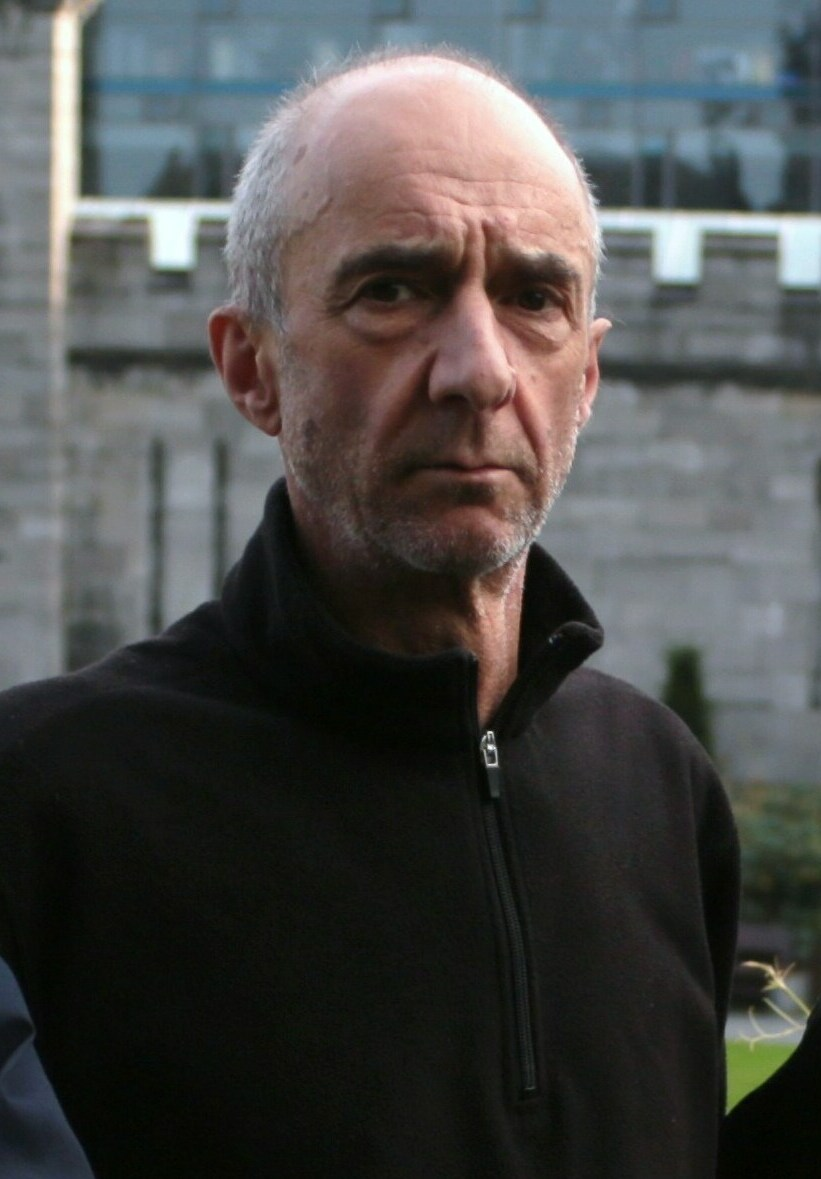
- Grey in 2013

Background information
- Also known as: Robert Gotobed
- Born: 21 April 1951 (age 75); Marefield, Leicestershire, England
- Origin: London, England
- Genres: Punk rock; art punk; post-punk; experimental rock
- Instrument: Drums
- Years active: 1973–present
- Member of: Wire
- Website: pinkflag.com

Robert Grey (born 21 April 1951) is an English musician best known as the drummer for Wire. He is sometimes credited as Robert Gotobed.

== Career ==
In 1973, Grey joined his first band, an R&B group called the Snakes, as vocalist. The Snakes released one single, "Teenage Head". After the group folded, Grey began teaching himself to drum.

He has been Wire's regular drummer since their start in 1976; at first he used the stage name 'Robert Gotobed'. The group broke up in 1980, reforming in 1985. Grey left Wire in 1990, after the release of the album Manscape, because of Wire's increasing use of sequencers, computers, and drum machines: he began to feel uncomfortable with the computer-based environment. After his departure, the band dropped one letter from its name, becoming "Wir". Grey began to explore African drumming and devoted his time to organic agriculture, running a small farm in the Midlands.

He rejoined Wire in 2000, dropping his Robert Gotobed alias and using his birthname Robert Grey. He has recorded and toured with the band since.
