= Graham Lewis =

British musician (born 1953)

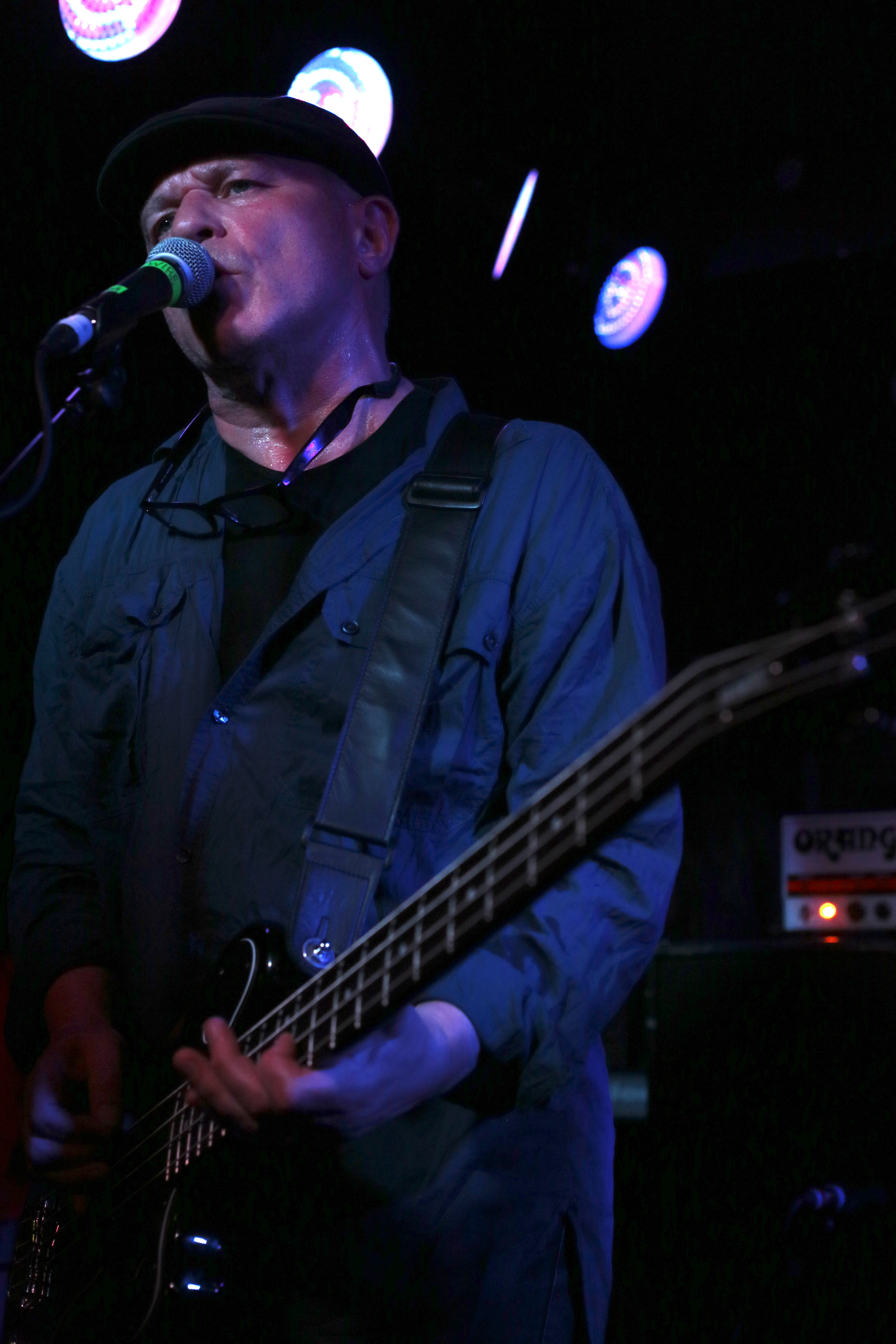
- Lewis performing in September 2013

Background information
- Born: 22 February 1953 (age 73); Grantham, Lincolnshire, England.
- Origin: England
- Occupation: Musician
- Instruments: Bass; vocals; guitar; keyboards
- Label: Mute

Graham Lewis (born Edward Graham Lewis, 22 February 1953) is an English musician. He is best known as a bassist, songwriter, and vocalist with punk rock/post-punk band Wire, of which he has been a core member since founding in 1976.

== Biography ==
On Wire's first studio album Graham Lewis was credited as Lewis; he continued to be known by this abbreviation; however some subsequent record credits give his full name.

Graham studied textiles at Middlesex Polytechnic in London in the early seventies. He later switched to fashion but formed the band before he was able to have a substantial career in this world. The time at art school influenced his later music as he was able to attend performances by a range of bands (usually pub bands) such as Kilburn and the High Roads, the Ramones, and Dr. Feelgood.

He has worked on other projects, such as Dome (with fellow Wire member B.C. Gilbert), Duet Emmo (with Gilbert and Daniel Miller, founder of Mute Records) P'o, Kluba Cupol, Ocsid (with Jean-Louis Huhta), Where Everything Falls Out (with Kenneth Cosimo and Anna Livia Löwendahl-Atomic), He Said Omala, and Halo. His solo projects include He Said and Hox.

Lewis also formed the band UUUU with Wire member Matthew Simms, Drummer Valentina Magaletti and Thighpaulsandra, releasing the album s/t in 2017.

With Matthew Simms, Mike Watt (Minutemen) and Bob Lee (The Black Gang), Lewis formed FITTED and released their first album First Fits in November 2019.

Lewis lives in Uppsala, Sweden.
