= Profile (Githead album) =

Studio album by Githead
- Released: 2005
- Genre: Post-punk
- Length: 44:21
- Label: swim ~

Githead chronology
Headgit (2004)	Profile (2005)	Art Pop (2007)

Professional ratings
Review scores
Source	Rating
Pitchfork Media	(6.9/10.0)

Profile is second release and first full-length album by the British rock band Githead, issued in 2005.

== Track listing ==
1. "Alpha" – 5:54
2. "My LCA (Little Box of Magic)" – 3:50
3. "Cosmology for Beginners" – 4:25
4. "Antiphon" – 4:46
5. "They Are" – 3:39
6. "Option Paralysis" – 5:26
7. "Wallpaper" – 5:40
8. "Raining Down" – 7:14
9. "Pylons" – 3:27

== Personnel ==
- Colin Newman - vocals, guitar
- Malka Spigel - bass, vocals
- Max Franken - drums
- Robin Rimbaud - guitar
