= Art Pop (album) =

Studio album by Githead
- Released: 2007
- Genre: Post-punk
- Length: 49:18
- Label: swim ~

Githead chronology
Profile (2005)	Art Pop (2007)	Landing (2009)

Professional ratings
Review scores
Source	Rating
Allmusic	4/5 stars
Pitchfork Media	(6.2/10.0)

Art Pop is the third release and second full-length album by the British rock band Githead, issued in 2007.

== Track listing ==
1. "On Your Own" – 3:08
2. "Drop" – 4:41
3. "Drive By" – 3:42
4. "Lifeloops" – 3:17
5. "These Days" – 3:58
6. "Jet Ear Game" – 4:10
7. "Space Life" – 5:31
8. "All Set Up" – 4:30
9. "Darkest Star" – 5:05
10. "Rotterdam" – 3:34
11. "Live In Your Head" – 7:42

== Personnel ==
- Colin Newman - vocals, guitar
- Malka Spigel - bass, vocals
- Max Franken - drums
- Robin Rimbaud - guitar
