= Immersion (duo) =

Music duo composed of Colin Newman and Malka Spigel

- Origin: London, England
- Genres: Electronic
- Years active: 1994–present
- Label: swim ~
- Members: Malka Spigel; Colin Newman
- Website: http://www.swimhq.com/

Immersion are a sound and art duo composed of Wire and Githead's Colin Newman and Minimal Compact and Githead's Malka Spigel.

The duo made three albums in the 1990s on the swim ~ label and also made video-driven performances in venues such as the Royal Festival Hall in London and the Knitting Factory in New York City. Their second album Full Immersion was a collaboration with a number of other electronic music artists including g-man, Claude Young, Fred Giannelli, Scanner, Vapourspace and Mick Harris.

== Discography ==
- Oscillating (1994)
- The Full Immersion: The Remixes, Vol. 1 (1995)
- Low Impact (1999)
- Analogue Creatures (EP, 2016)
- Analogue Creatures Living on an Island (2016)
- Sleepless (2018)
- Nanocluster Vol. 1 (with Tarwater, Laetitia Sadier, Ulrich Schnauss and Scanner) (2021)
- Nanocluster Vol. 2 (with Cubzoa, Thor Harris and Matt Schulz) (2024)
- Nanocluster Vol. 3 (with SUSS) (2025)
- WTF?? (2025)
- What Is Lost Will Return (2026)
