= Headgit =

Extended play by Githead

EP by Githead
- Released: November 1, 2004
- Genre: Post-punk, modern rock
- Length: 21:20
- Label: swim ~

Githead chronology
Headgit (2004)	Profile (2005)

Professional ratings
Review scores
Source	Rating
Allmusic	4/5 stars
Pitchfork Media	(7.7/10.0)

Headgit is first EP by the British rock band Githead. It was released in 2004.

== Track listing ==
1. "Reset" – 4:00
2. "Fake Corpses" – 3:38
3. "To Have & to Hold" – 3:53
4. "Craft Is Dead" – 3:40
5. "Profile" – 3:38
6. "12 Buildings" – 2:31

== Personnel ==
- Colin Newman - vocals, guitar
- Malka Spigel - bass, vocals
- Robin Rimbaud - guitar
