= Behind the Curtain (album) =

Compilation album by Wire
- Released: 5 May 1995
- Recorded: 1977–1978
- Genre: Post-punk, art punk, punk rock
- Label: EMI
- Producer: Mike Thorne

Wire compilation album chronology
1985-1990: The A List (1993)	Behind the Curtain (1995)	Turns and Strokes (1996)

Professional ratings
Review scores
Source	Rating
Allmusic	3/5 stars
Robert Christgau	B+

Behind the Curtain is a compilation album by English rock band Wire. It was released in 1995, composed of outtakes and early versions of songs from 1977–1978. The first six songs on the compilation come from the band's performance at The Roxy in London in April 1977 which was their first performance as a four-piece without George Gill on guitar. The full recording of this concert would later be released in 2006 as part of the Live at the Roxy, London – April 1st & 2nd 1977/Live at CBGB Theatre, New York – July 18th 1978 live album. The other twenty-five songs come from demos Wire made for their first three albums and include both songs that were rerecorded for those albums or for singles released in that time period and songs that were previously unreleased. The full demo sessions have since been released in 2018 on the special editions of the first three albums. The song "Stablemate" appears as "Stalemate" on the special edition of Chairs Missing.

== Track listing ==
No.	Title	Writer(s)	Length
1.	"Mary Is a Dyke"	Bruce Gilbert, George Gill, Robert Gotobed, Graham Lewis, Colin Newman	1:08
2.	"Too True"	Gilbert, Gotobed, Lewis, Newman	1:05
3.	"Just Don't Care"	Gilbert, Gotobed, Lewis, Newman	1:22
4.	"TV"	Gilbert, Gotobed, Lewis, Newman	1:26
5.	"New York City"	Gilbert, Gotobed, Lewis, Newman	1:12
6.	"After Midnight"	J.J. Cale	1:30
7.	"Pink Flag"	Gilbert, Gotobed, Lewis, Newman	2:35
8.	"Love Ain't Polite"	Gilbert, Gotobed, Lewis, Newman	1:05
9.	"Oh No Not So"	Gilbert, Gotobed, Lewis, Newman	1:37
10.	"It's the Motive"	Gilbert, Gotobed, Lewis, Newman	1:24
11.	"Practice Makes Perfect"	Gilbert, Newman	3:49
12.	"Sand in My Joints"	Lewis	1:51
13.	"Stablemate"	Gilbert, Gotobed, Lewis, Newman	2:17
14.	"I Feel Mysterious Today"	Lewis, Newman	1:41
15.	"Underwater Experiences"	Gilbert, Gotobed, Lewis, Newman	3:15
16.	"Dot Dash"	Lewis, Newman	2:20
17.	"Options R"	Lewis	1:51
18.	"From the Nursery"	Lewis, Newman	2:53
19.	"Finistaire"	Lewis, Newman	2:17
20.	"No Romans"	Gilbert, Gotobed, Lewis, Newman	1:12
21.	"Another the Letter"	Gilbert, Newman	1:07
22.	"40 Versions"	Gilbert	3:19
23.	"Blessed State"	Gilbert	3:14
24.	"A Touching Display"	Lewis	5:19
25.	"Once Is Enough"	Newman	2:39
26.	"Stepping Off too Quick"	Gilbert, Gotobed, Lewis, Newman	1:24
27.	"Indirect Inquiries"	Lewis, Newman	3:20
28.	"Map Ref. 41°N 93°W"	Gilbert, Lewis, Newman	3:50
29.	"A Question of Degree"	Lewis, Newman	2:58
30.	"Two People in a Room"	Gilbert, Newman	2:04
31.	"Former Airline"	Gilbert	1:12

== Personnel ==
Production

- Tim Chacksfield – project co-ordination
- Kevin S. Eden – compilation, liner notes
- Bruce Gilbert – concept
- Graham Lewis – concept
- Jon Savage – compilation, liner notes
- Mike Thorne – producer
- Jon Wozencroft – compilation, liner notes, design
