= Wire on the Box: 1979 =

Live album by Wire
- Released: 4 October 2004
- Recorded: 14 February 1979
- Venue: WDR Studio L (Cologne, Germany)
- Genre: Post-punk
- Length: 58:07
- Label: Pinkflag

Wire live album chronology
| It's All In The Brochure (2000) | Wire on the Box: 1979 (2004) | The Scottish Play: 2004 (2005) |

Wire on the Box: 1979 is a live album and DVD by English rock band Wire. Whilst recorded in 1979, it was released on 4 October 2004 as the first in a series of archival releases on Wire's own Pinkflag label. It features the complete live television recording for the German Rockpalast music television show, broadcast by Westdeutscher Rundfunk (WDR). The live set consists largely of tracks from 1978's Chairs Missing and the then-yet-to-be-released 154, and is the second live recording to be released from Wire's original phase since 1981's Document and Eyewitness.

== Background ==
Wire performed on Rockpalast at the invitation of Alan Bangs, a German-based British disc jockey and radio/TV presenter. "What's remarkable about it was that it took a Brit living in Germany to get Wire on the telly. Nobody in Britain would do it at the time," Wire's Colin Newman said in 2012. "He put us on when The Old Grey Whistle Test wouldn't have us ... and if it wasn't for that there'd be no serious visual record of us playing in the 70s. For that, we're really grateful."

The Rockpalast recording was released by Wire themselves after being in the WDR archive for years. The band discovered that "as artists you have the legal rights to release it - another company couldn't, but the artist could," Newman said.

== Critical reception ==
Professional ratings
Review scores
| Source | Rating |
|---|---|
| AllMusic | 4/5 stars |
| The Austin Chronicle | 2.5/5 stars |
| Pitchfork | 8.1/10 |
| Prefixmag | 8.0/10 |

AllMusic found Wire's performance to be "energetic and dynamic," writing, "On the Box catches Wire at the height of its powers and this material still sounds remarkably fresh." Pitchfork also noted the band's "energy and passion" as well as being "tight, focused, even demented in their intensity at times." They described the performance as "spot-on" with a "spectacularly clear" sound.

The Austin Chronicle was less positive, feeling that "without the bold psychedelic flourishes of the Mike Thorne-produced Chairs Missing, ... this rather skeletal set rings hollow." They felt, however, that the band's performance on the release "brims with punch and fire ... and with decent fidelity to boot."

== Track listing ==
CD/DVD track listing
| No. | Title | Writer(s) | Length |
|---|---|---|---|
| 1. | "Introduction" | | 0:50 |
| 2. | "Another the Letter" | Bruce Gilbert, Colin Newman | 1:07 |
| 3. | "The 15th" | Newman | 2:29 |
| 4. | "Practice Makes Perfect" | Gilbert, Newman | 3:00 |
| 5. | "Two People in a Room" | Gilbert, Newman | 1:59 |
| 6. | "I Feel Mysterious Today" | Graham Lewis, Newman | 1:44 |
| 7. | "Being Sucked in Again" | Newman | 2:49 |
| 8. | "Once Is Enough" | Newman | 2:47 |
| 9. | "Blessed State" | Gilbert | 3:00 |
| 10. | "A Question of Degree" | Lewis, Newman | 2:44 |
| 11. | "Single K.O." | Lewis, Newman | 2:24 |
| 12. | "Mercy" | Lewis, Newman | 5:44 |
| 13. | "40 Versions" | Gilbert, Newman | 4:06 |
| 14. | "Former Airline" | Gilbert | 1:08 |
| 15. | "A Touching Display" | Lewis | 6:14 |
| 16. | "French Film Blurred" | Lewis, Newman | 2:34 |
| 17. | "Men 2nd" | Lewis, Newman | 1:39 |
| 18. | "Map Ref. 41°N 93°W" | Lewis, Newman | 3:37 |
| 19. | "Heartbeat" | Newman | 4:42 |
| 20. | "Pink Flag" | Lewis, Newman | 3:26 |

DVD bonus feature
| No. | Title | Length |
|---|---|---|
| 1. | "Interview" | 19:35 |

== Personnel ==
Wire

- Colin Newman – guitar, vocals
- Graham Lewis – bass, vocals
- Bruce Gilbert – guitar
- Robert Gotobed – drums

Production

- Alan Bangs – DVD interview
- Denis Blackham – remastering
- David Coppenhall – design
