= 3R4 =

Studio album by B.C. Gilbert & G. Lewis
- Released: 8 November 1980
- Recorded: September 2–7, 1980
- Studio: Blackwing Studios, London SE1
- Label: 4AD
- Producer: B.C. Gilbert, G. Lewis

B.C. Gilbert & G. Lewis chronology
Dome 2 (1980)	3R4 (1980)	Dome 3 (1981)

Professional ratings
Review scores
Source	Rating
AllMusic	4.5/5 stars

3R4 is an album by Bruce Gilbert and Graham Lewis, credited as B.C. Gilbert and G. Lewis, respectively. It was released in 1980 by record label 4AD.

== Content ==
Trouser Press wrote: "3R4 moves into the ambient drone music pioneered by Brian Eno, and its four tracks achieve an almost symphonic effect".

== Track listing ==
Side one
No.	Title	Writer(s)	Length
1.	"Barge Calm"	Gilbert, Lewis	1:11
2.	"3.4..."	Lewis	17:03

Side two
No.	Title	Writer(s)	Length
1.	"Barge Calm"	Gilbert, Lewis	1:08
2.	"R"	Gilbert	20:03

== Personnel ==
- B.C. Gilbert - guitar, bass, percussion
- G. Lewis - guitar, synthesizer, tapes, percussion
- Davyd Boyd - bass, voices
- Russell Mills - percussion

Technical

- Eric Radcliffe - engineer
- John Fryer - assistant engineer, tapes

== See also ==
- Dome
