= Dome (band) =

British post-punk duo

Background information
- Origin: London, England
- Genres: Experimental rock; post-punk; industrial; post-rock; electronic; ambient
- Labels: Dome
- Past members: Bruce Gilbert; Graham Lewis

Dome was an English musical duo formed in 1980, consisting of Bruce Gilbert (guitar, vocals, synthesizer) and Graham Lewis (bass, vocals, synthesizer) of Wire.

== Background ==
Gilbert and Lewis formed Dome during Wire's 1980–1984 hiatus. Over its first three albums, Wire's music had progressed from rapid-fire punk rock to moody, ambitious post-punk. Dome continued the experimentation, often abandoning traditional song structures in favor of found sounds, melodic fragments, and what critics Steven Grand and David Sheridan described as "lurching mechanical noises infrequently keeping a vague beat".

Between 1980 and 1981 Dome released three studio albums: Dome (1980), Dome 2 (1980) and Dome 3 (1981), on its own Dome Records label. In press photos, they presented themselves in business attire with tall cylindrical masks surrounding their heads and covering their faces.

As well as releasing albums as Dome, Gilbert and Lewis produced and released records by Desmond Simmons (who played on Wire bandmate Colin Newman's solo albums A-Z and Not To) and A.C. Marias, who had initially appeared on the band's first album, on the Dome label.

An album 3R4 was released in 1980 under the name B.C. Gilbert & G. Lewis as well as a single "Ends With the Sea" in 1981, followed by an EP Like This for Ages released as Cupol, all on the 4AD record label. In 1982 it released MZUI (Waterloo Gallery), an LP of recordings made at the Waterloo Gallery with Russell Mills.

In 1983 Gilbert and Lewis worked with Dome collaborator Angela Conway (aka A.C. Marias) to release Whilst Climbing Thieves Vie for Attention, an LP under the name P'O. The same year, they released an LP Or So It Seems under the name Duet Emmo—an anagram of "Dome" and "Mute"—with Daniel Miller, head of Mute Records, and released Will You Speak This Word a.k.a. Dome 4 on the Uniton label.

Wire reformed in 1984, although Dome continued to perform and record occasionally. Yclept, a collection of Dome's later work, was released on WMO in 1998.

== Discography ==
=== Studio albums ===
- Dome (1980)
- Dome 2 (1980)
- Dome 3 (1981)
- Will You Speak This Word (1982)

==== B.C. Gilbert & G. Lewis ====
- 3R4 (1980)

==== bcGilbert, gLewis & russellMills ====
- MZUI (1982)

==== Cupol ====
- Like This for Ages (1980)

==== Duet Emmo ====
- Or So It Seems (1983)

==== P'O ====
- Whilst Climbing Thieves Vie for Attention (1983)

=== Compilations and reissues ===
- 1 + 2 (1992)
- 3 + 4 (1992)
- Yclept (1999)
- 1-4+5 (2011)

=== Singles ===
- "Jasz" (1981)
- "Ends with the Sea" (1981) (as B.C. Gilbert & G. Lewis)
