= Dome 3 =

Studio album by Dome
- Released: October 1981
- Recorded: 13 November 1980 - 11 June 1981
- Studio: Blackwing Studios, London
- Genre: Post-punk; experimental rock; ambient; minimalism
- Length: 39:06
- Label: Dome
- Producer: Bruce Gilbert; Graham Lewis

Dome chronology
Dome 2 (1980)	Dome 3 (1981)	Will You Speak This Word (1982)

Professional ratings
Review scores
Source	Rating
AllMusic	4.5/5 stars

Dome 3 is the third studio album by the English post-punk band Dome, released in 1981 by the record label Dome.

== Content ==
Trouser Press wrote that Dome 3 "breaks stride" from Dome's previous releases, "lifting the beats of other cultures and mixing them with abstracted bits of psychedelia and disembodied noises."

== Track listing ==
All songs written by Bruce Gilbert and Graham Lewis unless otherwise indicated.

Side one
No.	Title	Writer(s)	Length
1.	"Jasz"		3:48
2.	"Ar-Gu"		5:25
3.	"An-An-An-D-D-D"	Gilbert, Lewis, Angela Conway	4:20
4.	"Ba-Dr"		4:04
5.	"D-D-Bo"	Gilbert, Lewis, Conway	3:52
6.	"Na-Drm"		1:39
Total length:			23:08

Side two
No.	Title	Length
1.	"Ur-Ur"	3:31
2.	"Danse"	3:34
3.	"Dasz"	3:03
4.	"Roos-An"	5:50
Total length:		15:58

== Personnel ==
Credits adapted from liner notes.

Engineering

- Eric Radcliffe
- John Fryer

Dome

- Bruce Gilbert - vocals, instruments, production
- Graham Lewis - vocals, instruments, production

Additional Musicians

- A.M.C. - vocals (tracks 1, 2, 6, 9, 10)
- Peter Price - drums, percussion (tracks 1, 2, 4, 5, 7)
- D.O. Miller - saxophone (tracks 1, 5, 7)
- Russell Mills - percussion, vocals (tracks 2, 5)
- Eric Radcliffe - guitar (track 2)
