= Rami Fortis =

Israeli musical artist (born 1954)

Rami Fortis רמי פורטיס
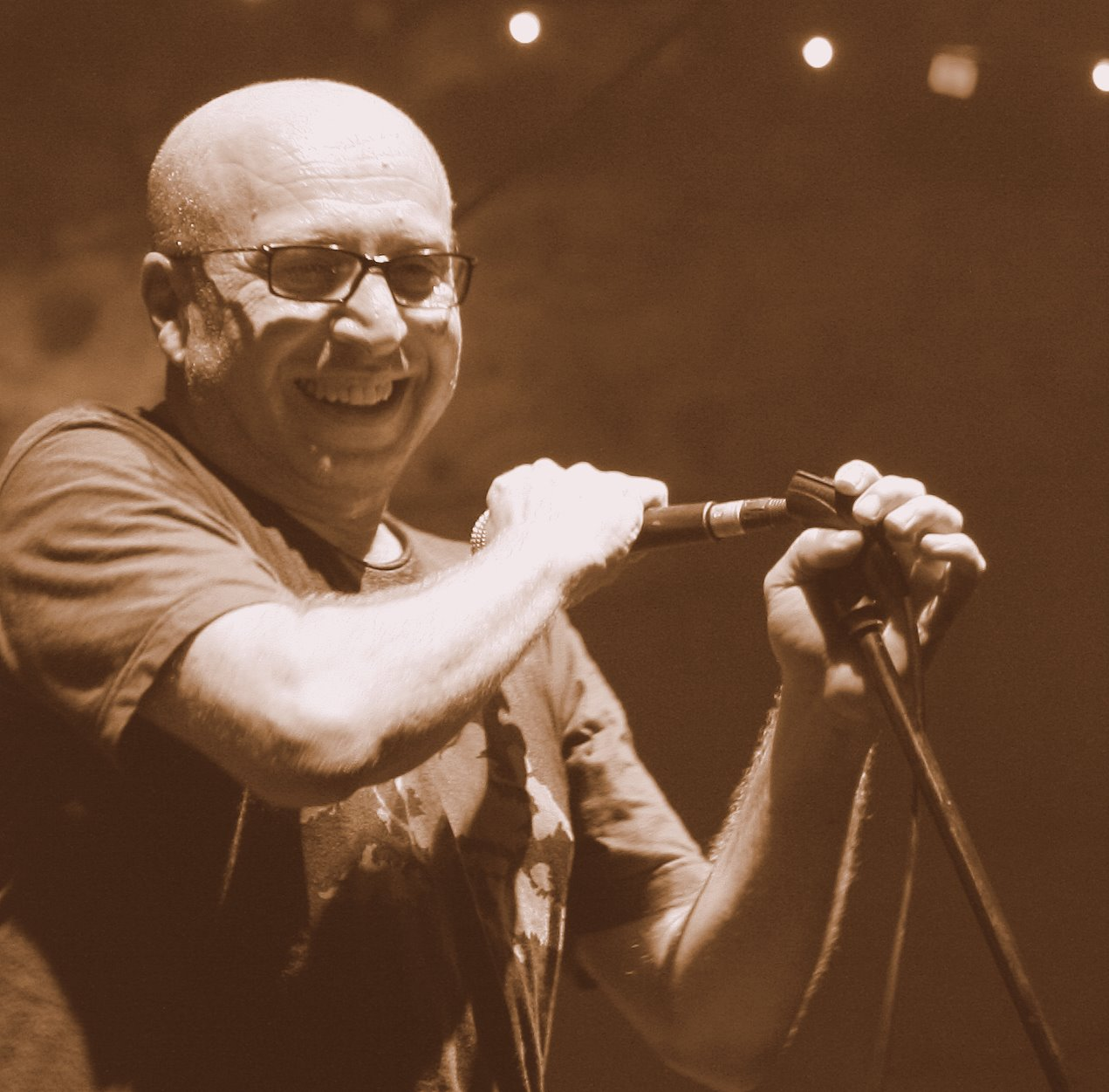
- 2007 concert

Background information
- Born: Ram Ephraim Fortis; 7 July 1954 (age 72); Kiryat Ono, Israel
- Origin: Tel Aviv, Israel
- Genres: Rock, punk rock
- Years active: 1975–present
- Labels: CBS; Nana Disc; Hed Arzi; Helicon
- Website: 4tis.com

Rami Fortis (Hebrew: רמי פורטיס; born 7 July 1954), or simply Fortis, is an Israeli rock singer. Born in Tel Aviv, Fortis became known as a pioneer of Israeli punk rock. His debut album Plonter, released in 1978, was not a commercial success at the time, though today it is considered an influential cult album. His fame in Israel came with the release of a Hebrew language album, Sipurim Me'hakufsa (Tales from the Box), in 1988. Due to his behaviour on stage he was nicknamed The Madman (HaMeshuga).

Apart from his work in music, Rami Fortis served as a judge for the first season of The X Factor Israel.

== Biography ==
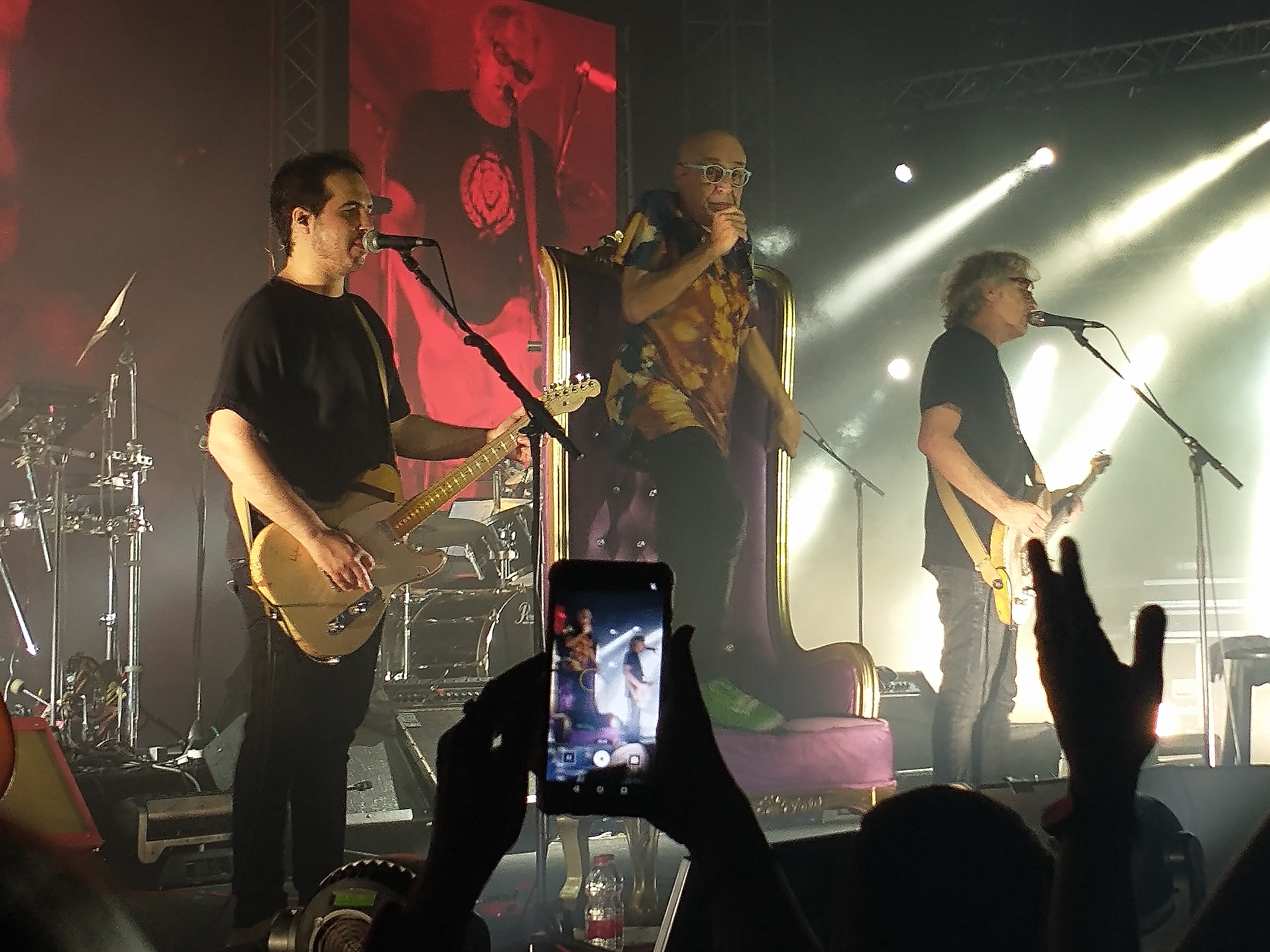
Left to right: Guy Fortis, Rami Fortis and Berry Sakharof, 2021

Rami Fortis is of Italian-Jewish and Iraqi-Jewish origin. He served in the 1973, Yom Kippur War and was influenced by his experiences at the front. He began his musical career in 1975 as a lighting-man in the shows of Tamuz - one of Israel's prominent rock groups at that time. The band would get him on stage to sing one or two songs in their concerts.

His 1978 debut album, Plonter, is considered a breakthrough in Israeli music. It was regarded as one of the wildest and noisiest albums ever to be recorded in Israel, way ahead of its time. Influenced by such artists as The Clash, Sex Pistols, Iggy Pop and The Ramones, it was characterized by topics and a style that were unfamiliar and unconventional in Israel at the time.

A group of his Tel Aviv friends, guitar player Berry Sakharof (with whom Fortis had played in S.O.B), bass player Malka Spigel (who was Fortis' girlfriend at the time) & singer/ poet Samy Birnbach (who had contributed lyrics to Plonter) formed Minimal Compact in 1981 in Amsterdam. The band established itself as an alternative rock band in Europe, signing to Belgium's Crammed Records label, making two albums and adding the Dutch drummer Max Franken. In 1984, Fortis was asked to join and stayed with them up to the first split in 1988. He was part of the line up which produced the band's two best known albums: Deadly Weapons produced by Tuxedomoon's Peter Principle and Raging Souls produced by Wire's Colin Newman. He went on to tour with them extensively in Europe and Japan. Minimal Compact remain notable as the first (mainly) Israeli band to have gained considerable success outside of the country. They had a song ("When I go") included in Wim Wenders' Wings of Desire soundtrack and had covers designed by Neville Brody and Russell Mills.

On his return to Israel in 1988, Fortis recorded his second album, Sipurim Mehakufsa (Tales from the Box), a collaboration with Berry Sakharof which has been described as "the best thing to happen to Israeli Rock". Later albums included a collaboration with Mashina's Shlomi Bracha. Since 2004 the collaboration with Berry Sakharof has been revived with the reformation of the duo Fortisakharof.

When Fortisakharof disbanded, Fortis started a new band, first with drummer/producer Yuval Shafrir, then joined by Oren Kaplan on guitar and Amir Rosiano ("Jango") on bass. The band was named Fortis Brothers and recorded two albums, Cop, Criminal and the Whispering Giant (1994) and Where Are The Horses? (1996), at their own studio FAFA near the Carmel Market with sound engineer Dadi Tal, who also mixed both albums.

In September 2001, the film 1999?, directed by Israel Yerushalmi and documenting Fortis during the 1999 elections and the political turmoil of that year, was screened at festivals and cinematheques.

In 2008, Fortis was featured on the documentary movie On the Move about Ehud Banai and the Refugees.

In 2011, Fortis released an album called The Friend I, influenced by Nikola Tesla. His band for the album consisted of guitarist Ido Agmon, bassist Gil Smetana, and Yuval Shafrir on drums (the latter two also having been part of the original line-up of Fortisakharof), and the album was recorded and mixed by Shafrir at his studio in Tel Aviv.

== Discography ==
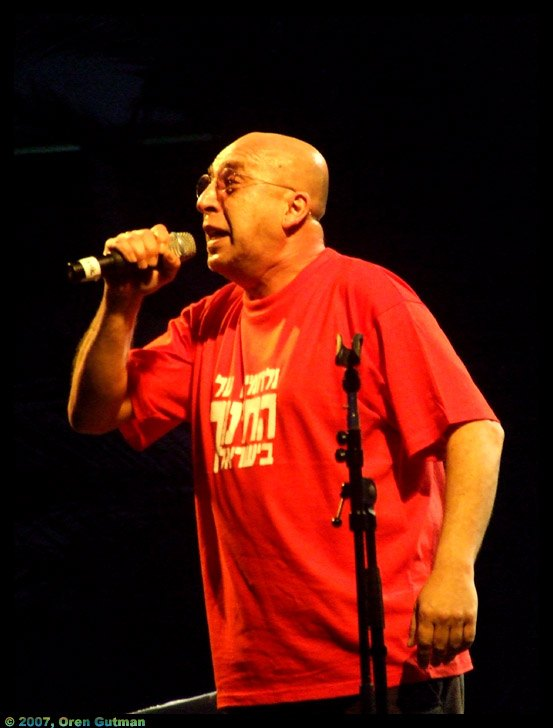
A performance during the International Students' Day

- 1978 – Plonter (Tangle), (Hebrew: פלונטר)
- 1988 – Sipurim Mehakufsa (Tales from the Box), (Hebrew: סיפורים מהקופסא)
- 1990 – 1900? (Fortisakharof)
- 1992 – Lehitraot Bechalomotai (See You in My Dreams), (Hebrew: להתראות בחלומותי)
- 1992 – Kshehagitara Menaseret Et Halaila (When the Guitar Saws the Night) (Live, Fortisakharof), (Hebrew: כשהגיטרה מנסרת את הלילה)
- 1994 – Shoter Poshea VeHa’anak Halochesh (Cop Crook and the Whispering Giant), (Hebrew: שוטר פושע והענק הלוחש)
- 1996 – Eifo Hasusim (Where are the Horses) (Fortis Bros.), (Hebrew: איפה הסוסים)
- 1998 – Ratz Al Haketzeh (Running on the Edge) (With Shlomi Bracha), (Hebrew: רץ על הקצה)
- 2001 – Hatzi Otomati (Semi Automatic), (Hebrew: חצי אוטומטי)
- 2006 – Al Hamishmeret (On Guard) (Fortisakharof), (Hebrew: על המשמרת)
- 2009 - Fortis Meshulash (Triangle, also meaning Triple) (3-cd set), (Hebrew: פורטיס משולש)
- 2011 - Hachaver Ani (The Friend I), (Hebrew: החבר אני)
- 2015 - Toldot Hackoteret (History of the title), (Hebrew: תולדות הכותרת)
- 2017 - Mador Feiyot (Fairy section), (Hebrew: מדור פיות)
