= Commercial Suicide =

Studio album by Colin Newman
- Released: 1986
- Genre: Chamber pop, art pop, minimal wave
- Length: 41:54
- Label: Crammed Discs
- Producer: Colin Newman

Colin Newman chronology
Not To (1982)	Commercial Suicide (1986)	It Seems (1988)

Commercial Suicide is the fourth studio album by English musician Colin Newman, released in 1986 by record label Crammed Discs.

A massive change in style for Newman, Commercial Suicide is reflective and highly orchestrated. His next LP, It Seems, followed a similar path, albeit with far more use of sequencers – something Newman would continue to work with for a number of years. Both Commercial Suicide and It Seems featured Malka Spigel, who married Newman in 1986, and who has been included in all subsequent solo and collaborative work.

== Reception ==
Professional ratings
Review scores
Source	Rating
AllMusic	4/5 stars

The album received positive reviews. Fact called it "an unmitigated delight: a complex, consoling, literate pop classic", going on to rank it the 69th best album of the 1980s. Wilson Neate of AllMusic wrote that the album "approaches listeners in a more subtle, measured fashion, its sound often deliberate and spacious, at times recalling the abstract textures of Provisionally Entitled the Singing Fish (1981). That's not to say this album lacks a pop sensibility." He went on to write that it "prefigure[s] [...] the deconstructed symphonic pop done so well by Blur." Jim Derogatis and Wilson Neate, writing in Trouser Press, said that Commercial Suicide combined Newman's "ambient and pop interests by bringing a more spacious, minimalist approach to vocal-driven tunes."

== Track listing ==
1. "Their Terrain" - 5:01
2. "2-Sixes" - 5:17
3. "Metarkest" - 5:12
4. "But I..." - 4:53
5. "Commercial Suicide" - 4:02
6. "I'm Still Here" - 3:47
7. "Feigned Hearing" - 4:02
8. "Can I Explain The Delay?" - 4:55
9. "I Can Hear Your..." - 4:46
