= Domer =

Domer may refer to:

- a nickname for an alumnus of the University of Notre Dame, South Bend, Indiana, U.S.
- the original mascot (a turtle) of the Rogers Centre, Toronto, Canada
- the nickname for alumni of the State University of New York Maritime College, U.S.
- the nickname of Twitch streamer Trainwreckstv
- Ali Hamra Domer (1927–1985), a Syrian poet and author

== See also ==
- Chilthorne Domer, a village in Somerset, England
- Dome (disambiguation)
- Dormer, roof structure
