= Turns and Strokes =

Compilation album by Wire
- Released: May 1996
- Recorded: 19 July 1979 at Notre Dame Hall, London (tracks 1 and 2); November 1979 at Stoke Newington (track 3); 10 November 1979 at Cochrane Theatre (tracks 4–6); 29 February 1980 at Electric Ballroom (tracks 7–10)
- Genre: Post-punk, experimental rock
- Label: WMO

Wire compilation album chronology
Behind the Curtain (1995)	Turns and Strokes (1996)	Coatings (1997)

Professional ratings
Review scores
Source	Rating
Allmusic	3/5 stars

Turns and Strokes is a live compilation album by English rock band Wire. It was released in May 1996, consisting of various live recordings and rehearsal tapes from 1979 and 1980 with versions of previously unavailable songs, as well as two cuts from the band's EP release. In some ways, it can be considered a follow-up to the band's 1981 release Document and Eyewitness. The album cover, which features a saltire, was originally the cover for the band's 1983 single "Crazy About Love".

== Track listing ==
No.	Title	Writer(s)	Length
1.	"Safe"	Graham Lewis, Colin Newman	1:38
2.	"Lorries"	Newman	4:08
3.	"A Panamanian Craze?"	Lewis	16:15
4.	"Remove for Improvement"	Bruce Gilbert, Newman	1:56
5.	"The Spare One"	Gilbert, Robert Gotobed, Lewis, Newman	2:58
6.	"Over My Head"	Gilbert, Gotobed, Lewis, Newman	4:10
7.	"12XU"	Gilbert, Gotobed, Lewis, Newman	2:07
8.	"Inventory"	Newman	3:03
9.	"Ritual View"	Gilbert, Lewis	2:36
10.	"Part of Our History"	Gilbert, Gotobed, Lewis, Newman	6:02
11.	"Second Length (Our Swimmer)"	Gilbert, Gotobed, Lewis, Newman	2:49
12.	"Catapult 30"	Gilbert, Gotobed, Lewis, Newman	5:03

== Personnel ==
Wire

- Bruce Gilbert – guitar
- Robert Gotobed – drums
- Graham Lewis – bass guitar, vocals
- Colin Newman – guitar, vocals

Production

- Denis Blackham – mastering
- Dave Coppenhall – design
- Kevin S. Eden – liner notes
- Bruce Gilbert – design
- Steve Parker – engineer
- Annette Wakefield – photography
- Dennis Weinreich – engineering
