= Coatings (album) =

Compilation album by Wire
- Released: 21 October 1997
- Recorded: 1985–1990
- Genre: Alternative dance, experimental rock, post-punk
- Length: 89:15
- Label: WMO

Wire compilation album chronology
Turns and Strokes (1996)	Coatings (1997)	1977–1979 (2006)

Professional ratings
Review scores
Source	Rating
Allmusic	3/5 stars

Coatings is a compilation album by English rock band Wire. It was released on 21 October 1997 and compiles studio recordings from the band's second era (1985–90) that appeared only as B-sides, alternate mixes, bonus tracks previously unavailable in the UK and several Peel Session tracks.

== Track listing ==
All tracks are written by Bruce Gilbert, Robert Gotobed, Graham Lewis, and Colin Newman

No.	Title	Length
1.	"Ambulance Chasers" (Original Version)	5:09
2.	"A Serious of Snakes" (Alternate Mix)	6:13
3.	"Ambitious" (Alternate Mix)	5:11
4.	"Madman's Honey" (Alternate Mix)	3:03
5.	"Kidney Bingos" (Original Mix)	5:19
6.	"It's a Boy" (Instrumental)	3:56
7.	"German Shepherds" (John Peel Session, May 10, 1988)	5:33
8.	"Boiling Boy" (John Peel Session, May 10, 1988)	5:36
9.	"Drill" (John Peel Session, May 10, 1988)	8:33
10.	"In Vivo" (Club Mix)	6:28
11.	"Who Has Nine?"	6:05
12.	"It Can't Be True Can It?"	4:06
13.	"Gravity Worship"	5:09
