= Bastard (Colin Newman album) =

1997 album by Colin Newman

Studio album by Colin Newman
- Released: July 29, 1997
- Genre: Electronica
- Length: 50:43
- Language: English
- Label: Swim ~
- Producer: Colin Newman

Colin Newman chronology
| It Seems (1988) | Bastard (1997) |

Professional ratings
Review scores
| Source | Rating |
|---|---|
| AllMusic | 4/5 stars |
| NME | 5/10 |

Bastard is the sixth studio album by Colin Newman, lead singer of post-punk band Wire. It was released in 1997 on Newman's label Swim ~.

The album is almost entirely instrumental, with tracks largely built from guitar loops and samples. The first pressing of the album was packaged with a free copy of Newman's four-track Voice EP. Despite Newman's name being on the cover, he has stated that these releases, along with several others on Swim ~, are essentially collaborative efforts with his wife and musical partner, Malka Spigel.

== Critical reception ==
The album received mostly positive reviews. Jim Derogatis and Wilson Neate, writing in Trouser Press, called the album "an attractive, subtle hybrid of melodic electronica and rock". John Bush, writing for AllMusic, called Bastard "a mighty progression" from the previous album It Seems, "with no concessions to song-based forms, but instead a willingness to use those styles to create diverting music." Franklin Bruno, in CMJ New Music Monthly, noted that the album reiterates Newman's longstanding interest in musical repetition and found the approach "intriguing", but also said that the music "doesn't exactly invite the listener in", likening the album to "a party after everyone's left".

Writing in the NME, and giving it 5/10, Dele Fadele said that Newman and Spiegel "seem more concerned with repetition and with testing the listener's levels of endurance than with anything that resembles a conventional tune, and so 'Bastard' roles inexplorably on to its conclusion - somehow out of time, out of place and finally, out of stream."

== Track listing ==
All tracks are written by Colin Newman and Malka Spigel.

| No. | Title | Length |
|---|---|---|
| 1. | "Sticky" | 5:21 |
| 2. | "May" | 5:56 |
| 3. | "Slowfast (Falling Down the Stairs With a Drumkit)" | 5:51 |
| 4. | "Without" | 6:53 |
| 5. | "G-Deep" | 4:51 |
| 6. | "Spaced In" | 3:42 |
| 7. | "Spiked" | 5:15 |
| 8. | "The Orange House and The Blue House" | 6:28 |
| 9. | "Turn" | 6:26 |
| Total length: | | 50:43 |
