= Provisionally Entitled the Singing Fish =

1981 album by Colin Newman

Studio album by Colin Newman
- Released: 1981
- Studio: Scorpio, London, England
- Genre: Post-punk
- Language: English
- Label: Beggars Banquet, 4AD
- Producer: Colin Newman

Colin Newman chronology
A-Z (1980)	Provisionally Entitled the Singing Fish (1981)	Not To (1982)

Professional ratings
Review scores
Source	Rating
AllMusic	3/5 stars

Provisionally Entitled the Singing Fish is the second studio album by Colin Newman, lead singer of post-punk band Wire. It was released in 1981, through record labels Beggars Banquet and 4AD.

The album is entirely instrumental, with each song titled simply "Fish One," "Fish Two," and so on. Newman took inspiration in part from the experimental work of Newman's Wire bandmates Bruce Gilbert and Graham Lewis as Dome, and from Brian Eno's ambient work. It marked a break from his partnership with producer Mike Thorne over disagreements about pursuing a more commercial, chart-friendly sound.

Record label 4AD reissued both Provisionally Entitled the Singing Fish and Newman's third solo album, Not To, as a single disc in 1988.

== Critical reception ==
The album received mixed reviews, and less attention than other albums in Newman's discography. AllMusic gave it 3 out of 5 stars but no written review. Richard Cook of the British music magazine NME called the album, along with Newman's previous work A-Z, "erratic and needlessly fussy affairs that creak under pretensions to alchemy when studio pottering is nearer the mark."

== Track listing ==
All tracks are written by Colin Newman

Side A
No.	Title	Length
1.	"Fish One"	2:31
2.	"Fish Two"	1:49
3.	"Fish Three"	3:04
4.	"Fish Four"	4:58
5.	"Fish Fiver"	4:05
6.	"Fish Six"	2:17

Side B
No.	Title	Length
7.	"Fish Seven"	2:30
8.	"Fish Eight"	4:07
9.	"Fish Nine"	3:45
10.	"Fish Ten"	3:01
11.	"Fish Eleven"	1:58
12.	"Fish Twelve"	3:34

== Personnel ==
- Colin Newman – instruments, mouth noise, cover and production
- Robert Gotobed – drums on "Fish Nine"
- Steve Parker – engineering
