= It Seems =

1988 album by Colin Newman

Studio album by Colin Newman
- Released: 1988
- Studio: Daylight Studios, Brussels
- Genre: Post-punk
- Language: English
- Label: Crammed Discs
- Producer: Colin Newman, Giles Martin

Colin Newman chronology
Commercial Suicide (1986)	It Seems (1988)	Bastard (1997)

Professional ratings
Review scores
Source	Rating
AllMusic	3/5 stars

It Seems is the fifth studio album by Colin Newman, lead singer of post-punk band Wire. It was released in 1988 by Crammed Discs.

It Seems built on the reflective and highly orchestrated of his 1986 album Commercial Suicide, albeit with far more use of sequencers – something Newman would continue to work with for a number of years. Both Commercial Suicide and It Seems featured Malka Spigel, who married Newman in 1986, and who has been included in all subsequent solo and collaborative work.

== Critical reception ==
The album received positive reviews. Jim Derogatis and Wilson Neate, writing in Trouser Press, said that It Seems built on what they called the "spacious, minimalist approach" of Newman's 1986 album Commercial Suicide, saying that It Seems "refines this sound and has several songs ('Quite Unrehearsed,' 'Round & Round' and the title track) that are as striking as anything Wire recorded." Neate, writing for AllMusic, noted the album's "serene, reflective quality" and said that it "laid the foundation" for Newman's subsequent exploration of electronic music. Option magazine called it "dreamily beautiful."

== Track listing ==
All tracks are written by Colin Newman, unless otherwise noted

No.	Title	Writer(s)	Length
1.	"Quite Unrehearsed"		4:16
2.	"Can't Help Being"		3:25
3.	"Rite of Life"	Newman/Bonnar/Spigel	3:36
4.	"An Impressive Beginning"	Newman/Bonnar	3:32
5.	"It Seems"	Newman/Bonnar	4:02
6.	"Better Late Than Never"	Newman/Bonnar	4:16
7.	"Not Being in Warsaw"		4:14
8.	"At Rest"		4:01
9.	"Convolutions"		3:22
10.	"Round and Round"	Newman/Spigel	4:11
11.	"Si Tu Attends"	Angelo/Newman	3:52

== Personnel ==
- Colin Newman – instruments, vocals
- Malka Spigel – instruments, vocals
- John Bonnar – instruments, vocals
- Robert Gotobed – drums
- Luc van Lieshout – trumpet
- Rino Christ – French horn
- Jean-Paul Danhier – trombone
- Marc Hollander – clarinet
- Engineered by Giles Martin
- Produced by Colin Newman and Giles Martin
