= Will You Speak This Word =

Studio album by Dome
- Released: 1982
- Recorded: 1982
- Studio: Blackwing Studios, London
- Genre: Post-punk; experimental rock; ambient; minimalism
- Length: 37:08
- Label: Uniton
- Producer: Bruce Gilbert; Graham Lewis

Dome chronology
Dome 3 (1981)	Will You Speak This Word (1982)	Yclept (1999)

Will You Speak This Word is the fourth studio album by English post-punk band Dome, released in 1982 by Norwegian record label Uniton.

== Content ==
According to Trouser Press, Will You Speak This Word "combines some of Dome 3's ethnic borrowings with the repetitive minimalism of earlier works."

== Reception ==
Professional ratings
Review scores
Source	Rating
AllMusic	4.5/5 stars

AllMusic called it "even more intriguing" than Dome 3, "if in some ways impenetrable". Trouser Press called it "a progressive album in the truest sense of the term".

== Track listing ==
All songs written by Bruce Gilbert and Graham Lewis unless otherwise indicated.

Side one
No.	Title	Writer(s)	Length
1.	"To Speak"	Gilbert, Lewis, David Drinkwater	18:15
Total length:			18:15

Side two
No.	Title	Length
1.	"To Walk, To Run"	4:06
2.	"To Duck, To Dive"	4:07
3.	"This"	3:25
4.	"Seven Year"	5:04
5.	"Atlas"	2:11
Total length:		18:53

== Personnel ==
Credits adapted from liner notes.

Engineering

- Eric Radcliffe

Dome

- Bruce Gilbert - vocals, production
- Graham Lewis - vocals, production

Additional Musicians

- Vincent Clark - vocals, Fairlight Computer Synthesizer (track 1)
- Deborah Danahey - vocals (track 1)
- David Drinkwater - violin (track 1)
- Terrence Leach - saxophone (tracks 1, 3, 4, 6)
