= Not To =

1982 album by Colin Newman

Studio album by Colin Newman
- Released: 1982
- Studio: Scorpio, London, England
- Genre: Post-punk
- Language: English
- Label: Beggars Banquet, 4AD
- Producer: Colin Newman

Colin Newman chronology
Provisionally Entitled the Singing Fish (1981)	Not To (1982)	Commercial Suicide (1986)

Professional ratings
Review scores
Source	Rating
AllMusic	3/5 stars

Not To is the third studio album by Colin Newman, lead singer of post-punk band Wire. It was released in 1982, through record labels Beggars Banquet and 4AD.

Like Newman's first solo record A-Z, much of the material on Not To was reworked from songs intended for Wire's never-completed fourth album, and the other members of Wire, particularly Graham Lewis, are co-credited on several of the songs.

Record label 4AD reissued both Not To and Newman's second solo album, Provisionally Entitled the Singing Fish, as a single disc in 1988.

== Critical reception ==
The album received positive reviews. Jim Derogatis and Wilson Neate, writing in Trouser Press, called Newman's solo work "the most rewarding" of any Wire member's projects outside the main band. Discussing A-Z and Not To, they wrote, "Both albums are inventive and full of hooks, and they continue the cinematic style of Chairs Missing and 154. Richard Cook of the British music magazine NME thought the album was a return to form after Newman's first two solo albums, A-Z and Provisionally Entitled the Singing Fish, calling it "icicle-cool pop" and a "reversion to melodic strength, [striking] out a course for singsong appeal without apology," further declaring that Not To, in comparison to what he called the "aimless greyness" of other Wire members' solo works, showed that Newman was "the principal creative force behind Wire." AllMusic gave it 3 out of 5 stars but no written review.

== Track listing ==
All tracks are written by Colin Newman, unless otherwise noted.

Side A
No.	Title	Writer(s)	Length
1.	"Lorries"		3:51
2.	"Don't Bring Reminders"	Newman/Lewis	3:27
3.	"You Me and Happy"		2:37
4.	"We Meet Under Tables"		3:47
5.	"Safe"	Newman/Lewis	2:34
6.	"Truculent Yet"		3:49

Side B
No.	Title	Writer(s)	Length
7.	"5/10"	Newman/Lewis/Gilbert/Gotobed	3:32
8.	"1, 2, 3, Beep Beep"		2:14
9.	"Not To"		3:33
10.	"Indians!"	Newman/Simmons/Gillham/Gotobed	3:05
11.	"Remove for Improvement"	Newman/Gilbert	4:07
12.	"Blue Jay Way"	George Harrison	3:11

== Personnel ==
- Robert Gotobed – drums, percussion
- Colin Newman – vocals, guitars, piano, tabla, vibes, percussion
- Simon Gillham – bass, vocals
- Desmond Simmons – guitars, piano, recorder, vocals
- Bruce Gilbert – "guest greatest hits guitar" on "Indians!"
- Colin Newman – producer
- Steve Parker – engineering
