= Sundome (disambiguation) =

Sundome (Japanese: すんドめ) is a Japanese seinen manga comic book and media franchise.

Sundome, Sun Dome, SunDome, or variation, may refer to:

== Facilities ==
- Yakima SunDome, in Yakima, Washington, United States; a multipurpose arena
- USF Sun Dome, a multipurpose arena at the University of South Florida, Tampa, Florida, United States
- MTN Sundome, in Johannesburg, South Africa; an event venue
- Sun Dome Fukui, in Echizen, Fukui, Japan; a multipurpose arena
- Sundome Nishi Station (Japanese: サンドーム西駅), a Fukui Railway Fukubu Line railway station located in Sabae, Fukui Prefecture, Japan.

== Music ==
- "Sundome", a song by Battles from their 2011 album Gloss Drop

== See also ==
- Dome (disambiguation)
- Sun (disambiguation)
