= Too True (disambiguation) =

Too True is a 2014 album by the Dum Dum girls.

Too True may also refer to:

- "Too True", a song by Ken Stringfellow from 1997 album This Sounds Like Goodbye
- "Too True", a song by Wire from 1995 album Behind the Curtain
- "Too True", a song by Mighty Joe Plum from 1997 album Happiest Dogs

== See also ==
- Too True to Be Good 1932 comedy by playwright George Bernard Shaw
