= The Scottish Play: 2004 =

Live album by Wire
- Released: 28 March 2005
- Recorded: 30 April 2004 at The Triptych Festival, The Tramway Theatre, Glasgow, Scotland (tracks 1–14); 26 April 2003 at Barbican Hall, Barbican Centre, London, England (DVD tracks 15–18)
- Length: 53:09 (CD); 66:24 (DVD)
- Label: Pinkflag

Wire live album chronology
Wire on the Box: 1979 (2004)	The Scottish Play: 2004 (2005)	Live at the Roxy, London - April 1st & 2nd 1977/Live at CBGB Theatre, New York - July 18th 1978 (2006)

Professional ratings
Review scores
Source	Rating
Allmusic	4/5 stars
PopMatters	8/10

The Scottish Play: 2004 is a live album and DVD by English rock band Wire. It contains an audio CD of performances at The Triptych Festival at The Tramway Theatre in Glasgow, Scotland and Barbican Hall at Barbican Centre in London, England as well as an accompanying DVD of the same performances. It was released on 25 March 2005.

== Track listing ==
All tracks are written by Wire

No.	Title	Length
1.	"99.9"	7:44
2.	"Germ Ship"	1:39
3.	"Mr. Marx's Table"	4:29
4.	"1st Fast"	1:32
5.	"Read & Burn"	2:50
6.	"The Agfers of Kodack"	4:04
7.	"Comet"	2:43
8.	"In the Art of Stopping"	3:43
9.	"Spent"	4:20
10.	"I Don't Understand"	4:22
11.	"Strange"	3:08
12.	"106 Beats That"	1:27
13.	"Surgeon's Girl"	1:20
14.	"Pink Flag"	9:42

== Personnel ==
Production

- Denis Blackham – mastering
- Colin Newman – mixing
- Tom Gidley – direction and editing on DVD tracks 1–14
