= Live at the Roxy, London – April 1st & 2nd 1977/Live at CBGB Theatre, New York – July 18th 1978 =

Live at the Roxy, London - April 1st & 2nd 1977/Live at CBGB Theatre, New York - July 18th 1978

Live album by Wire
- Released: 2006
- Recorded: 1–2 April 1977 at The Roxy, London, England; 18 July 1978 at CBGB, New York City, United States
- Genre: Post-punk, art punk
- Label: Pinkflag
- Producer: Colin Newman, Mike Thorne

Wire live album chronology
The Scottish Play: 2004 (2005)	Live at the Roxy, London - April 1st & 2nd 1977/Live at CBGB Theatre, New York - July 18th 1978 (2006)	Legal Bootleg Series: 25 Oct 1978 Bradford University (2007)

Alternative cover

Professional ratings
Review scores
Source	Rating
Allmusic	3.5/5 stars
BBC Music	(favourable)
Robert Christgau	(3-star Honorable Mention)
Record Collector	3/5 stars

Live at the Roxy, London – April 1st & 2nd 1977/Live at CBGB Theatre, New York – July 18th 1978 is a live double album by English rock band Wire. It was released in 2006. It comprises 1 and 2 April 1977 performances at The Roxy, London, England and an 18 July 1978 performance at CBGB, New York City, United States.

== Track listing ==
Disc one
Live at the Roxy, London - April 1st & 2nd 1977

FRI 1st April 1977
No.	Title	Writer(s)	Length
1.	"The Commercial"	Graham Lewis	1:00
2.	"Mary Is a Dyke"	George Gill, Colin Newman	1:08
3.	"Too True"	Newman	1:05
4.	"Just Don't Care"	Lewis, Newman	1:21
5.	"Strange"	Bruce Gilbert, Newman	2:29
6.	"Brazil"	Lewis, Newman	0:47
7.	"It's So Obvious"	Lewis, Newman	0:56
8.	"Three Girl Rhumba"	Newman	1:29
9.	"TV"	Gilbert, Newman	1:26
10.	"Straight Line"	Gilbert, Newman	0:53
11.	"Lowdown"	Lewis, Newman	2:23
12.	"Feeling Called Love"	Newman	1:20
13.	"NYC"	Lewis, Newman	1:12
14.	"After Midnight"	J.J. Cale	1:27
15.	"12XU"	Gilbert, Lewis, Newman	2:03
16.	"Mr Suit"	Newman	1:50
17.	"Glad All Over"	Dave Clark, Mike Smith	1:43

SAT 2nd April 1977
No.	Title	Writer(s)	Length
18.	"The Commercial"	Lewis	1:02
19.	"Mary Is a Dyke"	Gill, Newman	1:39
20.	"Too True"	Newman	1:06
21.	"Just Don't Care"	Lewis, Newman	1:27
22.	"Strange"	Gilbert, Newman	2:40
23.	"Brazil"	Lewis, Newman	1:04
24.	"It's So Obvious"	Lewis, Newman	1:00
25.	"Three Girl Rhumba"	Newman	1:39
26.	"TV"	Gilbert, Newman	1:18
27.	"Straight Line"	Gilbert, Newman	1:40
28.	"Lowdown"	Lewis, Newman	1:48
29.	"Feeling Called Love"	Newman	1:21
30.	"NYC"	Lewis, Newman	1:10
31.	"After Midnight"	Cale	1:08
32.	"12XU"	Gilbert, Lewis, Newman	2:01
33.	"Glad All Over"	Clark, Smith	1:21
34.	"Mr Suit"	Newman	2:07

Disc two
Live at CBGB Theatre, New York - July 18th 1978

No.	Title	Writer(s)	Length
1.	"Men 2nd"	Lewis, Newman	1:41
2.	"Reuters"	Lewis, Newman	2:34
3.	"106 Beats That"	Lewis, Newman	1:02
4.	"From the Nursery"	Lewis, Newman	2:38
5.	"Dot Dash"	Lewis, Newman	2:19
6.	"Another the Letter"	Gilbert, Newman	1:07
7.	"Practice Makes Perfect"	Gilbert, Newman	2:34
8.	"Marooned"	Gilbert, Lewis, Newman	2:19
9.	"I Am the Fly"	Lewis, Newman	3:12
10.	"Lowdown"	Lewis, Newman	2:10
11.	"Mercy"	Lewis, Newman	5:41
12.	"Outro"		1:31

== Personnel ==
Wire

- Bruce Gilbert – guitar
- Robert Gotobed – drums
- Graham Lewis – bass guitar, backing vocals
- Colin Newman – guitar (disc two), vocals

Production

- Denis Blackham – mastering
- David Coppenhall – design
- Chris Hollebone – engineering (disc one)
- Charles Martin – theatre mix (disc two)
- Phil Newell – engineering (disc one)
- Colin Newman – liner notes, production (post-production)
- Gus Stewart – cover photography
- Mike Thorne – original project production
