= Dome (album) =

Studio album by Dome
- Released: July 1980
- Recorded: 10 March – 1 April 1980
- Studio: Blackwing Studios, London
- Genre: Post-punk; experimental rock; ambient; minimalism
- Length: 36:03
- Label: Dome
- Producer: Bruce Gilbert; Graham Lewis

Dome chronology
Dome (1980)	Dome 2 (1980)

Dome is the debut studio album by English post-punk band Dome, released in 1980 by record label Dome.

== Reception ==
Professional ratings
Review scores
Source	Rating
AllMusic	2/5 stars

Trouser Press wrote: "Dome abandons conventional song form for a hodgepodge of treated instruments and voices, with lurching mechanical noises infrequently keeping a vague beat; melodies fragment under studio manipulation", calling it "eerie".

== Track listing ==
All songs written by Bruce Gilbert and Graham Lewis unless otherwise indicated.

Side one
No.	Title	Writer(s)	Length
1.	"Cancel Your Order"		2:13
2.	"Cruel When Complete"	Gilbert, Angela Conway	3:14
3.	"And Then..."		4:19
4.	"Here We Go"		3:15
5.	"Rolling Upon My Day"		3:46
Total length:			16:47

Side two
No.	Title	Writer(s)	Length
1.	"Say Again"		3:36
2.	"Linasixup"	Lewis	4:14
3.	"Airmail"		3:28
4.	"Ampnoise"		4:26
5.	"Madmen"		3:32
Total length:			19:16

== Personnel ==
Credits adapted from liner notes.

Cover Design

- M.J. Collins

Engineering

- Eric Radcliffe
- John Fryer

Dome

- Bruce Gilbert - vocals, guitar, bass, percussion, tape, drums
- Graham Lewis - vocals, guitar, bass, percussion, tape, synthesizer

Additional Musicians

- Angela Conway - vocals on “Cruel When Complete”
