= Dome 2 =

Studio album by Dome
- Released: October 1980
- Recorded: August 1980
- Studio: Blackwing Studios, London
- Genre: Post-punk; experimental rock; ambient; minimalism
- Length: 36:13
- Label: Dome

Dome chronology
Dome (1980)	Dome 2 (1980)	3R4 (1980)

Professional ratings
Review scores
Source	Rating
AllMusic	2/5 stars

Dome 2 is the second studio album by English post-punk band Dome, released in 1980 by record label Dome.

== Content ==
Dome 2 "continues the ambient/minimalist experimentation of the first two albums".

== Track listing ==
Side one
No.	Title	Length
1.	"The Red Tent I"	5:34
2.	"The Red Tent II"	3:26
3.	"Long Lost Life"	3:16
4.	"Breathsteps"	4:21
5.	"Reading Prof. B"	3:01
Total length:		19:38

Side two
No.	Title	Length
1.	"Ritual View"	4:52
2.	"Twist Up"	4:23
3.	"Keep It"	7:20
Total length:		16:35

== Personnel ==
Credits adapted from liner notes.

Engineering

- Eric Radcliffe
- John Fryer

Dome

- Bruce Gilbert
- Graham Lewis
