= Or So It Seems =

Studio album by Duet Emmo
- Released: August 1983
- Recorded: 1981–1982
- Studio: Blackwing Studios, London
- Genre: Minimal wave; experimental
- Length: 43:04
- Label: Mute
- Producer: Bruce Gilbert; Daniel Miller; Graham Lewis; John Fryer; Eric Radcliffe

Singles from Or So It Seems
- 1. "Or So It Seems" Released: March 1983

Or So It Seems is an album by Graham Lewis, Bruce Gilbert and Daniel Miller under the pseudonym Duet Emmo (an anagram of Dome and Mute), released in 1983 by Mute Records.

The title track was also released as a 12" single and its b-side "Heart of Hearts" was included as a bonus track on CD releases of the album.

== Reception ==
Professional ratings
Review scores
Source	Rating
AllMusic	2/5 stars

AllMusic called it "less a seamless marriage of the collaborators' aesthetics than an awkward cohabitation of abstruse Dome material with more accessible and melodic synth-oriented fare". Trouser Press wrote: "Or So It Seems fluctuates between atonal, electronic sound collages and stiff, monotonous synth-funk reminiscent of D.A.F., with no track ever getting off the ground. Fun studio noodling no doubt, but not of lasting import."

== Track listing ==
All tracks are written by Bruce Gilbert, Daniel Miller and Graham Lewis

Side A
No.	Title	Length
1.	"Hill of Men"	4:36
2.	"Or So It Seems"	8:55
3.	"Friano"	3:39
4.	"The First Person"	4:46

Side B
No.	Title	Length
5.	"A.N.C."	1:48
6.	"Long Sledge"	16:39
7.	"Gatemmo"	1:03
8.	"Last's Card"	1:38
Total length:		43:04

CD bonus track
No.	Title	Length
9.	"Heart of Hearts"	8:04
