= She Appeared Like the Wind =

Studio album by Ehud Banai & Berry Sakharof
- Released: January 8, 2017
- Recorded: 2016
- Length: 47:37
- Language: Hebrew

She Appeared Like the Wind (Hebrew: היא הופיעה כמו הרוח, He Hofi'ah Kmo Haruach) is a studio album jointly recorded by Ehud Banai and Berry Sakharof during the course of 2016 and released on January 8, 2017. The entire album is composed of Ladino (Judeo-Spanish) songs. The majority of the lyrics were translated into Hebrew by Banai and Sakharof. The album has one instrumental piece “Trenta Lira” and one song “Noches Noches” is sung in the original Ladino.

== Background ==
Banai & Sakharof were exposed to Ladino songs as children: Banai listened to recordings and songs of the Ladino researcher Yitzhak Isaac Levy who was a friend of his father, whereas Sakharof, who immigrated to Israel with his family from Turkey, heard the language and songs at home. During one of their meetings in 2001 Banai told Sakharof that he has some old Ladino recordings by Levy. They decided to renew some of the songs and even included them in their joint performances in 2003. Every few years they met to work and make new arrangements for the songs. During such meetings they discovered additional songs such as those by the early 20th Century Ladino singer Haim Effendi, and listened also to Hebrew and Ladino recordings. Over the past few years they chose the 12 songs gathered in this album.

On November 12, 2016 the first single from the album was released: Avre tu Puerta Serrada (English: "Open Your Closed Door", Hebrew: פתחי לי את דלתך, Pitchi Li Et Daltech), one of the most popular songs of Ladino repertoire. This song has many versions - the earliest one known from 1907/8 by Haim Effendi and other popular recordings by Duo Parvarim, Yehoram Gaon and Yitzhak Isaac Levy.

The second single Malandanzas del Asker (English: "The Soldier’s Song", Hebrew: שיר החייל, Shir HaChayal), was released on December 27 accompanied by a video clip directed by Betina Fainshtein. The song tells of conscription to the military imposed on the Jews by the Ottoman Empire in 1908. The soldier in the song laments his suffering sharing his sorrow with his father and mother. Haim Effendi recorded a rare version of this song in 1912. Banai & Sakharof dedicated the song to Ahuva Ozeri, who died two weeks before its release.

The album was released in several formats: a CD, a digital album and a CD-book containing in addition to the CD a book with an introduction to Spanish Jewry, collected essays by Prof. Edwin Seroussi, Dr. Shoey Raz, Ehud Banai, Berry Sakharof and short explanations about the actual songs by Dr. Rivka Havassy. The book contains information about Ladino singer Haim Effendi and the Ladino singer and researcher Yithzk Isaac Levy.

Banai & Sakharof launched the album with 2 performances at Mann Auditorium, Tel-Aviv on January 23 and February 2, 2017. The album’s musical producer Assaf Talmudi accompanied them on keyboards and accordion. Other band members were: Gil Smetana (bass and double bass), Itamar Doari (percussion), Yonatan Daskal (keyboards), Galia Hai (viola), Hadas Kleinman (cello) and Nir Mantzur (drums). Banai & Sakharof played guitars and sang.

On February 8 an additional video clip was released. This time it accompanies the musical piece “Trenta Lira” which shows Banai & Sakharof on their way to a show. It is composed from footage taken behind the scenes of the previous video clip “The Soldier’s Song” and was also directed by Betina Fainshtein.

== Track listing ==
| No. | Title | English Title | Length |
|---|---|---|---|
| 1. | "He Hofi'ah Kmo Haruach" | She Appeared Like the Wind | 3:40 |
| 2. | "Shalosh Hen Bnot HaPele" | Three Marvelous Sisters | 3:48 |
| 3. | "HaSirena" | The Siren | 4:58 |
| 4. | "Shir HaChayal" | The Soldier's Song | 4:22 |
| 5. | "El HaChalon Esa Einay" | I Lift Up My Eyes to Your Window | 4:52 |
| 6. | "Ima, Lo Ra'iti" | MaMa, I've Never Seen | 5:31 |
| 7. | "Yom Sheni Alot HaShachar" | Monday at Sunrise | 3:58 |
| 8. | "Ro'ah Yafa" | A Beautiful Shepherdess | 2:50 |
| 9. | "Pitchi Li Et Daltech" | Open Your Door For Me | 3:54 |
| 10. | "Trenta Liras" | Thirty Liras | 3:06 |
| 11. | "HaEtzim Lagshamim Bochim" | The Trees Cry For the Rain | 3:33 |
| 12. | "Noches Noches" | Good Nights | 3:05 |
