= Dome (disambiguation) =

A dome is a structural element of architecture that resembles the hollow upper half of a sphere.

Dome may also refer to:

== Architecture ==
- Geodesic dome
- Monolithic dome

== Geology ==
- Dome (geology), a deformational feature consisting of symmetrically-dipping anticlines
- Granite dome, a dome of granite, formed by exfoliation
- Ice domes, a dome of ice, an ice surface located in the accumulation zone
- Lava dome, a mound-shaped growth resulting from the eruption of high-silica lava from a volcano
- Lunar dome, a type of shield volcano found on the surface of the Earth's moon
- Resurgent dome, a volcanic dome that is swelling or rising due to movement in the magma chamber
- Salt dome, formed when a thick bed of evaporite minerals (mainly salt, or halite) found at depth intrudes vertically into surrounding rock strata

== Places ==
=== Arenas ===
- Dôme (Charleroi), France
- Dôme de Paris, France
- Hubert H. Humphrey Metrodome (1982), Minneapolis, Minnesota, also known as "The Dome" or "The Metrodome"
- Millennium Dome (1999), London also known as "The Dome"
- NRG Astrodome (1999), Houston, Texas, also known as the "Astrodome" or the "Houston Astrodome"
- Le Dôme de Marseille, France

=== Places ===
==== Antarctica ====
- Arctowski Dome
- Anderson Dome
- Bonnabeau Dome
- Dome A
- Dome C
- Dome F
- Law Dome
- Siege Dome
- Titan Dome

=== Asia ===
- Domé, one of the Tibetan names for the Amdo region

==== Canada ====
- Dome Mine, Ontario

==== New Zealand ====
- Dome (Polar Range), a mountain in Canterbury

==== United States ====
- Teapot Dome (also known as Teapot Rock), Wyoming

== People ==
- Malcolm Dome (1955–2021), English music journalist
- Ram Chandra Dome (born 1959), Indian politician
- Dome (artist) (born 1975), German graffiti artist
- Domelipa (born 2001), Mexican influencer and singer

== Art, entertainment, and media ==
- Dome (band), a 1980s post punk band
  - Dome (album)
- The Dome (periodical), a quarterly publication of the Victorian era, containing examples of contemporary literature, art and music
- Dome (1987), a science fiction novel by Michael Reaves and Steve Perry
- Le Dôme, a 1996 album by Jean Leloup

== Enterprises ==
- Dôme (coffeehouse), a chain of café restaurants based in Perth, Australia
- Dome (constructor), a Japanese-based racing car constructor
- Le Dôme, a garagiste wine label of Bordeaux wine producer Château Teyssier
- Le Dôme Café, historical Paris intellectual venue

== Math, science, and technology ==
- Dome (mathematics), a closed geometrical surface which can be obtained by sectioning off a portion of a sphere with an intersecting plane
- DOME project, a computer architecture project for the Square Kilometre Array, designed by ASTRON and IBM Zurich Research Laboratory
- Norton's dome, a thought experiment concerning causality in Newtonian mechanics
- Dome, colloquial term for an overshooting top above a thunderstorm anvil cloud

== Transportation ==
- Dome car, a type of railway passenger car
- Dome/GWCC/Philips Arena/CNN Center (MARTA station), a passenger rail station in Atlanta, Georgia named after the Georgia Dome
- Steam dome, a steam locomotive component

== Other uses ==
- Teapot Dome scandal, Wyoming, United States
- Dome, slang for the upper half of the head or a bald head or a head
- Dome, slang for oral sex
- Golden Dome, American missile defense system
- Iron Dome, Israeli mobile air defense system
- Retroflex consonant, or "domal consonant"
- Steel Dome, Turkish air defense system
