= Berry Sakharof =

Israeli rock singer and guitarist (born 1957)

Berry Sakharof ברי סחרוף
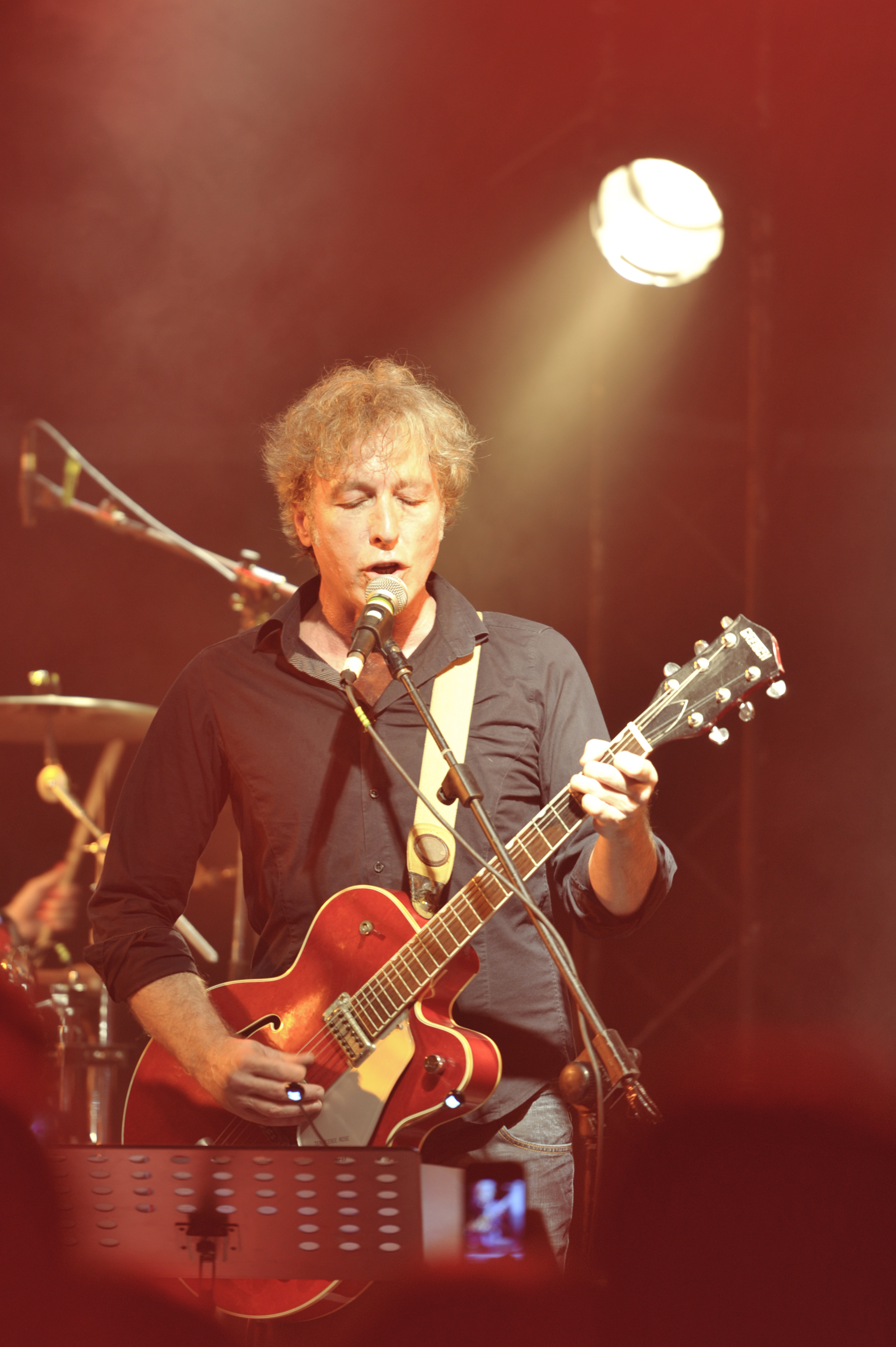
- Berry Sakharof.

Background information
- Born: 7 July 1957 (age 69); İzmir, Turkey
- Genres: Rock, alternative rock, post-punk, experimental rock
- Occupations: Singer-songwriter, guitarist, producer
- Instruments: Vocals, guitar
- Years active: 1973–present
- Label: Nana Disc
- Website: berry.co.il

Berry Sakharof (Hebrew: ברי סחרוף, [ˈbeʁi ˈsaχaʁof]; born 7 July 1957) is an Israeli rock guitarist, singer-songwriter, and producer. He is often referred to as the prince of Israeli rock.

== Biography ==
Sakharof was born in İzmir, Turkey, in 1957 into a Jewish family. He was named after his grandfather Bernard Sakharof who was a famous piano player from Russia who moved to Turkey.

His family immigrated to Israel when he was 3 years old.

=== Start of career ===
Sakharof started his musical career at the age of 16 as a member of Cosmic Dream. Another member was his friend, Rami Fortis. Together they performed in rock clubs in Israel.

=== 1980s ===
Sakharof first came to public attention in the 1980s.

Right after his military service Sakharof flew to Belgium, where he became a founding member of post-punk band Minimal Compact, the first Israeli rock band to achieve significant success outside Israel. The band recorded six albums, all released on Crammed Discs.

On 24 July 1984, Sakharof was arrested in the Ben Gurion Airport possessing a small quantity of cocaine. He was tried and sentenced to a year in prison, of which he served 8 months.

In 1988, Minimal Compact broke up after the members did not get work visas for the United States, where they planned a concert tour. Sakharof and fellow former Minimal Compact guitarist Rami Fortis began an extended period of collaboration, eventually returning to Israel and producing many songs.

=== 1990s ===
After leaving Fortis, Sakharof continued producing albums. The album Signs of Weakness (Simanim Shel Khulsha) (סימנים של חולשה), a collaboration with multi-instrumentalist and producer Rea Mochiach, was chosen as the 11th best album ever (and the highest ranking for an Israeli album) by a readers' poll on the popular news site Ynet.

By the mid-1990s, Sakharof's was one of the highest-grossing live acts in Israel, and he was commonly referred to in the media as the "prince of Israeli rock".

Sakharof's biggest commercial success came in 1998 with the release of Touches (נגיעות), the sales of which reached platinum within several days.

=== 2000s ===
In 2001 his album The Other (האחר) was released. The album included the song "Lord of World", which was written by Barry Hazak, a soldier who died in the Yom Kippur War and a cover of Ehud Banai's song "City of Refuge". The album's name was taken from the perception of "The Other" (French: L'autre) of the French philosopher Emmanuel Lévinas, who is also quoted in the album's booklet. "Monsoon", which was written by Micha Shitrit and Berry Sakharof, was the only song from the album broadcast on the radio as a single. In the same year Sakharof wrote soundtracks for two Israeli movies.

In 2002, Sakharof collaborated with Erez Aizen and Amit Duvedevani of Infected Mushroom to create the Birthday EP.

In 2003 he produced the debut album of the band Biluim named the Biluim.

During 2005 his album 11 Alef (11א) was released. The album is the result of about two years of mutual work with Rea Mochiach (who moved to the United States after the release of the album Signs of Weakness) during Mochiach's occasional visits to Israel. The album was sold in the first week only on the Internet in the MP3 format and later released to the music stores; due to the release of the album Mochiach arrived in Israel and participated in a short concert tour with Sakharof.

In 2006 Sakharof reunited with Fortis for a new album and a tour.

=== Recent activity ===
Sakharof continues to play gigs, mostly in Israel, but also some shows in America and other parts of the world. In 2009 he released Ibn Gabirol, a concept album that has a melancholic tone to it and deals with lyrics written by Solomon ibn Gabirol, one of the greatest Jewish poets of the Middle Ages, a man that died prematurely but left with his poetry a heritage for hundreds of years. the album is not a rock-album but traditional middle-eastern instruments and songwriting comes into play.

2011 Sakharof released another solo album, you are here (Ata Nimtza kan) (אתה נמצא כאן), which again brings the classic Sakharof-style with electric guitars, drum computers, synths, bass and vocals. The lyrics cover a wide range of topics, from the High Holy Days (Yamim haNoraim) (ימים הנוראים), over a ghostly town (Lochesch baMchoniot) (לוחש במחוניות), to relationship problems (Nechama, Zman shel Misparim) (זמן של מספרים). The song "Haderekh le Arad" ("The road down to Arad") (הדרך לערד) paints the picture of a dried out desert landscape that is waiting for the fulfillment of the prophecies, when the Jewish people will be visited by their king, who will appear victoriously. "The wolf that will dwell with them is not yet born" (haZeev sheyagur itam, adayin lo nolad ... ) ("הזאב שיגור איתם, עדיין לא נולד).

Minimal Compact also played some revival-gigs in late 2011 with Samy Birnbach on vocals and a rare stage presence of Malka Spigel on bass guitar.

== Discography ==
=== Solo albums ===
- 1991 – All or Nothing (Ha'kol O klum) (הכל או כלום)
- 1993 – Signs of Weakness (Simanim Shel Khulsha) (סימנים של חולשה)
- 1995 – Hot on the Moon (Kham Al Ha'Yare'akh) (חם על הירח)
- 1996 - Saint Clara (Clara Hakedosha) (קלרה הקדושה) - soundtrack to the film of the same name
- 1998 – Touches (Negiot) (נגיעות)
- 2001 – The Other (Ha'akher) (האחר)
- 2003 – Live 93-02
- 2005 – 11 Alef (11א)
- 2009 – Ibn Gavirol, (Those with) Reddened Lips (Ibn Gavirol, Adumey Ha'Sefatot) (אבן גבירול, אדמי שפתיים)
- 2011 – You Are Here (Ata Nimtsa Kan) (אתה נמצא כאן)
- 2015 – Touches (Negiot) (נגיעות) – a limited edition vinyl record
- 2016 – Gatherings (Likutim) (לקוטים)
- 2017 – She Appeared Like the Wind (Hi Hofi'ah Kmo Haruach) (היא הופיעה כמו הרוח)
- 2021 – A shred of light (Bdal Shel Or) (בדל של אור)
- 2026 – Ladder of Love (Sulam HaAhava) (סולם האהבה)

=== With Rea Mochiach ===
- 2009 – "Red Lips" (Adumey HaSefatot) (אֲדֻמֵּי הַשְּׂפָתוֹת)

=== With Minimal Compact ===
- 1981 – Minimal Compact (EP)
- 1982 – One by One
- 1984 – Deadly Weapons
- 1984 – Next One Is Real (EP)
- 1985 – Raging Souls
- 1986 – Immigrants Songs
- 1987 – The Figure One Cuts
- 1988 – Live
- 1988 – Lowlands Flight
- 2004 – Music From Upstairs: Archives & Experiments
- 2004 – Returning Wheel

=== With Rami Fortis (Fortisakharof) ===
- 1990 – 1900? (Elef T'sha Meot) (אלף תשע מאות)
- 1992 – When the Guitar Saws the Night
- 2006 – On the Watch (Al Ha'Mishmeret) (על המשמרת)

=== With Foreign Affair ===
- 1989 – East on Fire
- 1990 – Sandanya (EP)

=== As producer and contributor ===
- 1988 Rami Fortis – Tales from the Box (Sipurim Me'hakufsa) (סיפורים מהקופסה)
- 1998 Micha Shitrit – Nails and Feathers (Masmerim Ve'notzot) (מסמרים ונוצות)

(with Izhar Ashdot)

2003 Ha'Biluim – Ha'Biluim (הבילויים)

(with Korin Allal)

- 1989 Carmella Gross & Wagner - Black Flower (Perach Shachor) (פרח שחור)
