= Ali Hamra Domer =

Syrian poet (1927–1985)

- Born: Ali Hamra Domer; 1927; Hama, Syria
- Died: 1985 (aged 57–58); Saudi Arabia

Mohammad Ali Hamra Domer, also known as Ali Domer, (1927–1985) was a Syrian poet. He died in 1985 in Saudi Arabia due to a cardiac arrest.

== Early life and career ==
Mohammad Ali Hamra Domer, is a Syrian poet nicknamed Ali Domer. He was born in Hama city in 1927 and died in 1985 in Saudi Arabia due to a cardiac arrest. He graduated from the Arabic Literature faculty, Al-Azhar University in Cairo, Egypt, then he worked as an Arabic language teacher in Syria and he was preaching in a mosque. The poet's writings had exceeded ten thousand verses, and one of his most famous poems is “Al Gharam Al Qatal” (the killing love), the poet published eight collections, such as “Raashat” (shivers) in 1946, “Awasef Ala Hidab Falestin” (Storms on the hills of Palestine) in 1946, “Al Hanin Ila Al Layali” (Nostalgia for the nights) in 1954, “Al Majhoola” (the unknown) in 1959, “Ghaybobat Al Hobb” (the coma of love) in 1968, “Ishraqatu Al Ghorobb” (the sunrise of the sunset) in 1978, “Rassaal mohreha Ila Nizar Qabbani” (embarrassing messages to Nizar Qabbani) in 1981, “Shaab Allah Al Mokhtar” (God's chosen people). The poet also wrote prose, among his prose works: “Monaqashat wa Dirassat fi Al Arood wa Al Sal Hadith” (Discussions and studies in performances and modern poetry), “Mawssuat Al Arood wa Misfat Al shear wa Malamih Omri” (An encyclopedia of performances and poem refinery and features of my age).

== Literary writings ==
Some of the poet's poems:

- “Raashat” (shivers) in 1946.
- “Awasef Ala Hidab Falestin” (Storms on the hills of Palestine) in 1946.
- “Al Hanin Ila Al Layali” (Nostalgia for the nights) in 1954, “Al Majhoola” (the unknown) in 1959.
- “Ghaybobat Al Hobb” (the coma of love) in 1968.
- “Ishraqatu Al Ghorobb” (the sunrise of the sunset) in 1978.
- "Rassaal mohreha Ila Nizar Qabbani” (embarrassing messages to Nizar Qabbani) in 1981
