= Githead =

British post-punk/experimental band

- Origin: London, England
- Genres: Post-punk, experimental rock
- Years active: 2004–present
- Label: swim ~
- Members: Colin Newman; Malka Spigel; Robin Rimbaud; Max Franken
- Website: www.githead.com

Githead is a musical collaboration that includes Wire's Colin Newman as well as electronic musician Robin Rimbaud (Scanner) alongside Minimal Compact members Malka Spigel and Max Franken.

== Biography ==
The appearance of Githead and the release of their debut EP Headgit in 2004 surprised many, mainly because of the unlikely 'line up' and the fact that they operate in a pop and rock environment rather than a purely experimental one.

The band's genesis was as a 'one-off', as part of the celebrations of the Swim ~ label's 10th anniversary at the ICA, but it quickly became apparent that the band was more than a mere collection of individuals and that it was able to generate its style.

Initially without a drummer, the band wrote and rehearsed in Swim's studio from the outset. This guaranteed that all outbreaks of creativity could be instantly recorded. This meant that as well as building up a repertoire, the band was also recording towards an end of released material, and was subsequently able fairly rapidly to develop enough finished material to enable selections to be made for release.

Thus the debut EP Headgit was released before the band had played its third gig, and material to the debut album Profile was already in the works before the band had even played two gigs.

The first three shows were performed without a live drummer, but it had always been the band's intention to be able to play with live drums. In the end Max Franken from Malka's band Minimal Compact became the band's drummer.

Githead made their debut as a live four-piece in Antwerp in March 2005 following on with gigs in Spring and Summer that year. These included Queen Elizabeth Hall in London, Cité de la Musique in Paris, The Paradiso in Amsterdam, Barby in Tel Aviv, The Botanique in Brussels and The Garage in London.

In autumn 2005 the band concentrated on writing and recording their 2nd album Art Pop. It was released in May 2007 to general positive reviews. Their third album, Landing, was released November 2009.

== Band lineup ==
- Malka Spigel – bass, vocals
- Robin Rimbaud – guitar
- Max Franken – drums
- Colin Newman – vocals, guitar

== Discography ==
- Headgit (Nov 2004)
- Profile (June 2005)
- Art Pop (May 2007)
- Landing (November 2009)
- Waiting For a Sign (December 2014)
