= Gilles Martin =

French photojournalist and artivist

Gilles Martin, born May 14, 1956, is a French photojournalist and artivist.

== Biography ==
Gilles Martin spent his early years in Touraine where his father painted watercolors. Thus he learned to appreciate nature and then, to take pictures of it. At age 7, his grandfather offered him his first camera. Young teenager, he observed wildlife in the forest of Villandry. Later on, he had to reconcile his passion for naturalistic image and his profession as dental technician. He then made his reputation thanks to his book about dragonflies, La Vie secrète des filles de l'air (published by La Martinière), he decided to dedicate himself entirely to nature photography. Since then, he published a dozen of books, amongst them : Photographier la nature, La Macrophotographie, Les Oiseaux du monde, Les Papillons du monde (published by La Martinière).

Distributed in agencies, his pictures are regularly published by magazines such as GEO, Le Figaro Magazine, Terre sauvage, Life, National Geographic... He has been working for several years on the creation of a "global photographic arch", which consists of taking pictures of all rare or threatened species on the IUCN Red List.

- 1982 : Laureate of the Guilde européenne du raid, which finances his first great report on the Aldabra atoll.
- 1986 : First publication of the report on the massacre of sea turtles in the magazine Le Courrier de la Nature.
- 1989 : First prize of the Kodak Grand reportage allowance for the exploration Expédition Thylacine in Australia.

His pictures were shown in numerous exhibitions notably at the Senate in Paris in 2008 and in great festivals of natural and environmental photography.

- 2005 : Gilles Martin creates « L'Arche photographique » which aims to realize a global photographic inventory of endangered species. In this context, he launched five actions in support of biodiversity. The goal is to raise people awareness on threats on wildlife and encourage each and everyone of us to act for its preservation. To this day, he has travelled in 90 countries on all six continents to feed his ambitious project.
- 2013 : Gilles Martin creates the happening Mémoires d'un dos argenté (English : Memoirs of a Silverback) in the context of the international festival of wildlife and nature photography of Montier-en-Der.
- 2015 : He launches the photo/video agency Biospher Pictures.
- 2016 : Gilles Martin gets into artivism which depicts a new way to campaign for a cause. This activity allows him to paint his dreams on walls, to take pictures of his claims, to act out his beliefs. During the same year, he creates the studio/gallery called Top floor studio.
- 2017 : He organizes a street art campaign in New York to alert the general public of the United States to the disappearance of primates. This campaign is followed by an exhibition of street art at the Gabillet gallery in the context of Ateliers mode d'emploi, and later on by a publication of a report on street art in the magazine TMV Tours.
- 2018 : Gilles Martin publishes a portfolio on the work of artivists in the magazine Chasseur d'Images.

== Happening ==
Allan Kaprow, abstract painter, invented the term happening in 1957. It is described as an event or performance art which involves an active participation of the audience.

- 2013 : Production du happening 2027 - Mémoires d'un dos argenté (English : 2027 - Memoirs of a Silverback), dans le cadre du festival international de la photo animalière et de nature de Montier-en-Der.

== Books ==
- 1994 : Les libellules . Photographs : Gilles Martin. Text : Emmanuel Thévenon. Publisher : Éditions de La Martinière.
- 1995 : Australie continent sauvage. Photographs : Gilles Martin. Text : Houria Arhab et Gilles Martin. Publisher : Solar.
- 1996 : Australien Der fünfte Kontinent. Photographs : Gilles Martin. Text : Houria Arhab et Gilles Martin. Publisher : Karl Müller Verlag.
- 2000 : Le Poitou & Les Charentes. Photographs : Gilles Martin. Publisher : Éditions Larousse.
- 2000 : Photographier la nature dans tous ses milieux. Photographs : Gilles Martin. Text : Denis Boyard. Publisher : Éditions de La Martinière.
- 2002 : La macrophotographie. Photographs : Gilles Martin. Text : Ronan Loaëc. Publisher : Éditions de La Martinière.
- 2003 : Nature Photography . Photographs : Gilles Martin. Text : Denis Boyard. Publisher : Abrams.
- 2003 : Natur fotografie . Photographs : Gilles Martin. Text : Denis Boyard. Publisher : Christian Verlag.
- 2003 : Természetfotózás. Photographs : Gilles Martin. Text : Denis Boyard. Publisher : Alexandra Kiadó.
- 2003 : Macrophotography . Photographs : Gilles Martin. Text : Ronan Loaëc. Publisher : Abrams.
- 2003 : Makro fotografie . Photographs : Gilles Martin. Text : Ronan Loaëc. Publisher : Christian Verlag.
- 2003 : Les oiseaux du Monde . Photographs : Gilles Martin. Text : Myriam Baran. Publisher : Éditions de La Martinière.
- 2003 : Les oiseaux du Monde. Photographs : Gilles Martin. Text : Myriam Baran. Publisher : Hurtubise HMH.
- 2004 : Les oiseaux du monde racontés aux enfants. Photographs : Gilles Martin. Text : Philippe J. Dubois et Valérie Guidoux. Publisher : Éditions de La Martinière jeunesse.
- 2005 : Birds of the World . Photographs : Gilles Martin. Text : Myriam Baran. Publisher : Abrams.
- 2005 : A Világ Madarai . Photographs : Gilles Martin. Text : Myriam Baran. Publisher : Alexandra Kiadó.
- 2005 : Birds. Photographs : Gilles Martin. Text : Philippe J. Dubois et Valérie Guidoux. Publisher : Abrams.
- 2005 : Die Welt der Vögel für Kinder erzählt. Photographs : Gilles Martin. Text : Philippe J. Dubois et Valérie Guidoux. Publisher : Knesebeck.
- 2005 : Gli uccelli raccontati ai ragazzi. Photographs : Gilles Martin. Text : Philippe J. Dubois et Valérie Guidoux. Publisher : L’ippocampo.
- 2005 : Vogels aan kinderen verteld. Photographs : Gilles Martin. Text : Philippe J. Dubois et Valérie Guidoux. Publisher : Lannoo.
- 2006 : Papillons du monde . Photographs : Gilles Martin. Text : Myriam Baran. Publisher : Éditions de La Martinière.
- 2008 : Butterflies of the World . Photographs : Gilles Martin. Text : Myriam Baran. Publisher : Abrams.
- 2009 : Les oiseaux. Photographs : Gilles Martin. Text : Catherine Levesque. Publisher : Éditions Milan.

== Movies ==
- 2009 : Les Secrets des photographes animaliers 2. Director : Ronan Fournier-Christol. Production : Songes de Moaï.
- 2012 : Portrait de Gilles Martin. Director : Patrice Grange. Production : Déclic & Clac !
- 2014 : 2027 - Mémoires d'un dos argenté. Director : Gilles Martin. Production : L'Arche photographique.
