= A.C. Marias =

English musician

- Origin: London, England
- Genres: Dream pop; ambient pop
- Years active: 1981–1990
- Labels: Dome, Mute Records
- Members: Angela Conway

Angela Conway is an English musician who formally recorded under the name A.C. Marias as a Wire collaborator, as whom she released an album and several singles during the 1980s.

== History ==
The first A.C. Marias release was the "Drop" single, released in July 1981 on Wire's Dome label, and featuring the band's Bruce Gilbert and Graham Lewis. Conway went on to work with members of Wire as Duet Emmo, releasing the Or So It Seems album in 1983 on Mute Records. She subsequently signed a solo contract with the label.

As well as providing vocals for Lewis's He Said project in the mid-1980s, Conway's first A.C. Marias release for over five years, "Just Talk", was released in October 1986.

She was assisted by Gilbert on most of the recordings. On the single "Time Was" (1988) and the album One of Our Girls (Has Gone Missing) (1989) she was also assisted by other Mute Records musicians, including Barry Adamson and Rowland S. Howard. One of Our Girls was described by Allmusic writer Wilson Neate as "an intriguing collection of minimalist pop songs", while Trouser Press writer Ira Robbins described the album's first side as "a sheer pastel curtain of arty guitar figures, light synth strains, and dry, wispy vocals that never quite achieves song-ness". The album's title track was released as a single in February 1990, the last A.C. Marias release to date. The song was described by Simon Reynolds and Joy Press as "perhaps the ultimate expression of a female desire to be invisible", while Conway described the song's theme as "saying enough's enough...to be not present can be more powerful than actually being present and proclaiming your identity as 'woman'".

Conway put the project on hold in 1990, and concentrated on her work as a music video director, which included making videos for Wire.

She and Gilbert composed additional music for the Anna Campion film Loaded (also known as Bloody Weekend), under the name A.C. Marias.

== Discography ==
=== Albums ===
- One of Our Girls (Has Gone Missing) (1989), Mute

=== Singles ===
- "Drop"/"So" 7" (1980), Dome Records
- "Just Talk"/"No Talk", 7"/12" single (1986), Mute
- "Time Was"/"Some Thing", 7"/12" single (1989), Mute – UK Indie no. 27
- "One of Our Girls Has Gone Missing"/"Vicious", 12"/CD single (1989), Mute
