= Minimal Compact =

Israeli rock band

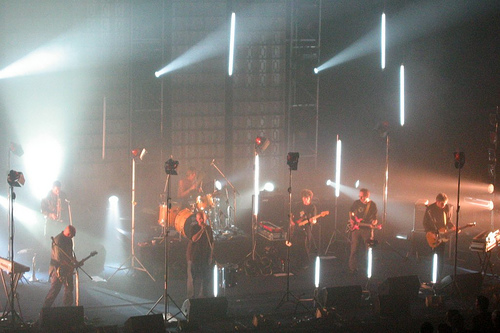
- Minimal Compact's reunion gig, Tel Aviv

Background information
- Origin: Tel Aviv, Israel; Brussels, Belgium
- Genres: Post-punk; new wave
- Years active: 1980–1988, 1991, 2003, 2008, 2012, 2016, 2019
- Labels: Crammed Discs, Wax Trax!
- Members: Malka Spigel; Samy Birnbach; Berry Sakharof; Max Franken; Rami Fortis

Minimal Compact is an Israeli rock band associated with the post-punk movement of the 1980s.

== Biography ==
Between its foundation in 1980 and its dissolution seven years later, Minimal Compact played an important role in the European rock scene. Malka Spigel (bass, vocals), Samy Birnbach (vocals, lyrics) and Berry Sakharof (guitars, keyboards, vocals) left their native Tel Aviv in 1981 for Amsterdam in search of an escape from the provincial attitudes of their own city. Of the trio, only Berry was a "real" musician. Malka was "learning to play the bass", while Samy was better known as a DJ (Morpheus) and a music fan who dabbled in poetry. They recorded a 2-song demo at home, and became one of the first artists signed to the Belgian Crammed label.

During the recording for a speculative 7" in a little studio in the Belgian countryside, it became quickly evident that the trio had hit upon something worthy of development and their first, self-titled, mini album Minimal Compact was the fruit of this. Their burgeoning style was a heavily Middle-Eastern coloured brand of post-new wave, based on driving rhythms, scratchy guitars and their own very un- "Anglo-American" style of vocalisation. In this way they both prefigured alternative dance and later fascinations with so called world music. This mini-album (now re-released on CD along with its successor "One by One") features "Statik Dancin' " which remained a live staple throughout the band's career, and "Creation Is Perfect", based on a text by the beat poet Bob Kaufman.

One by One, the second album, was recorded in London in 1982, and like its predecessor co-produced by Dirk Polak (from Mecano (Dutch band)) and Crammed supremo Marc Hollander. It includes tracks such as "Babylonian Tower", "Disguise" (another live staple), "It Takes a Lifetime". With this release Minimal Compact had become a "real band" with the addition of the native Amsterdammer Max Franken on drums. Now Minimal could play live, this was to prove a strong element in their career. As Minimal began to tour more extensively they went from strength to strength as a live band.

Deadly Weapons, produced by Gilles Martin and Tuxedomoon's Peter Principle dates from 1984 and is considered by some their most experimental album. Nonetheless, it threw up a "club classic" of the time in the shape of "Next One Is Real" (famously remixed by Dick O'Dell, one time boss of the Guerilla label). The sleeve was by Neville Brody. On this album the "classic" 5-person line up became complete with the addition of guitarist/vocalist Rami Fortis a long time Minimal cohort from Tel Aviv who was arguably Israel's most innovative post-punk musician with his solo debut Plonter (tangle). Fortis had previously collaborated with Malka on their "7 codes" tape (a low-fi home tape effort which had been sold in the indie shops in Amsterdam).

Touring by this point took them further and further afield, everywhere from Palermo to Kyoto fell to their conquest, although British success was limited to an NME single of the week and a John Peel session.

Raging Souls was released in 1985. Produced by Colin Newman, with artwork by Eno/Sylvian collaborator Russell Mills, it has proved their most popular album, with tracks like "My Will", "When I Go" (which was included in Wim Wenders' Wings of Desire movie soundtrack), "The Traitor", "Autumn Leaves" all of which became live favorites. By this time Minimal had become established in Brussels and were at the hub of the local "International Indie Scene" which featured at various times, Tuxedomoon (both individually and collectively), Bel Canto, Colin Newman, Sonoko, Gilles Martin and Benjamin Lew.

As a follow-up Minimal Compact recorded a 12" Immigrants Songs (featuring a Led Zeppelin cover) with Israeli Uri Barak. Like "Next One Is Real" before it the 12" received extensive US college/dance attention and figures amongst their most enduring work.

The Figure One Cuts was their last studio album, recorded in 1987 with producer John Fryer (Cocteau Twins, Depeche Mode, M/A/R/R/S). Tracks include "Nil-Nil"", "Inner Station", "New Clear Twist", "Piece of Green". The Lowlands Flight instrumental album was released at the same time in Crammed's "Made To Measure" series. The touring continued but their goal of following up their record success in the USA was never achieved as several planned tours were cancelled because the US immigration authorities refused to grant them visas.

Minimal Compact Live was recorded in 1987 in Rennes, France, this last album came out after the band split in '88.

In 2004, The band reformed briefly for a series of shows in Israel and a European tour. Crammed published a "best of" compilation and a box set containing unreleased material and remixes to coincide with the reunion. Berry & Fortis are currently collaborating under the name Fortisakharof, Malka & Max are in Githead & Samy continues to DJ and make music under the name DJ Morpheus.

In July 2008, the band reunited for series of live shows in Tel Aviv, Israel, starting on July 8, 2008, marking the 60th birthday of Samy Birnbach.

On November 12, 2011, it was announced that Minimal Compact would be reuniting for a short tour of five dates in Israel in January–February 2012. The band would perform in Tel Aviv and Jerusalem, between January 25–February 2, 2012.

On August 12, 2012, it was announced that Minimal Compact would perform a live gig at Lodz, Poland in September 2012.

On November 8, 2015, it was announced that Minimal Compact would be reuniting for two dates in Israel in January 2016. The high demand caused the band to extend the short tour to four dates; the band would perform in Tel Aviv, between January 20–26, 2016.

In October 2019 the album Creation Is Perfect was released. After the release of this album In November 2019 Minimal Compact held an additional five concerts in Israel. The concerts were all sold out.

== Band members ==
- Malka Spigel - bass, vocals
- Samy Birnbach - vocals, lyrics
- Berry Sakharof - guitars, keyboards, vocals
- Max Franken - drums
- Rami Fortis - guitars, vocals

== Discography (albums and EPs) ==
=== Albums ===
- 1981: Minimal Compact (Crammed Discs)
- 1982: One By One (Crammed Discs)
- 1984: Pieces for Nothing – Soundtrack for the 1983 ballet by Pierre Droulers. Included in the compilation "Made to Measure Vol. 1" (Crammed Discs), featuring Tuxedomoon, Aqsak Maboul and Benjamin Lew
- 1984: Next One Is Real (Wax Trax!)
- 1984: Deadly Weapons (Crammed Discs)
- 1985: Raging Souls (Crammed Discs)
- 1987: Lowlands Flight (Made to Measure Vol. 10) (Crammed Discs)
- 1987: The Figure One Cuts (Crammed Discs)
- 1988: Minimal Compact Live (Crammed Discs)
- 2003: Returning Wheel (Classics) (NMC Records)
- 2004: There's Always Now (Remixes & Remakes) (Crammed Discs)
- 2019: Creation Is Perfect (Minimal Compact)
