= A–Z (album) =

Studio album by Colin Newman
- Released: October 1980
- Recorded: 1980
- Studio: Scorpio, London, England
- Genre: Post-punk
- Length: 43:43
- Language: English
- Label: Beggars Banquet
- Producer: Mike Thorne

Colin Newman chronology
A–Z (1980)	Provisionally Entitled the Singing Fish (1981)

A–Z is the debut studio album by Colin Newman, lead singer of post-punk band Wire. It was released in October 1980, through record label Beggars Banquet. "A-Z was planned as the fourth Wire album, but EMI [Wire's label] cancelled studio time in the wake of failed negotiations with the band."

== Critical reception ==
Professional ratings
Review scores
Source	Rating
AllMusic	4.5/5 stars
Christgau's Record Guide	B+
Pitchfork	8.2/10
Record Mirror	4/5 stars
Smash Hits	7/10
Uncut	9/10

A–Z has been well received. Jim Derogatis and Wilson Neate, writing in Trouser Press, called Newman's solo work "the most rewarding" of any Wire member's projects outside the main band. Discussing A-Z and Not To, they wrote, "Both albums are inventive and full of hooks, and they continue the cinematic style of Chairs Missing and 154." In his retrospective review for AllMusic, Andy Kellman wrote, "A–Z truly deserves to be held in the same regard as Pink Flag, Chairs Missing and 154". Jason A. Parkes of Head Heritage wrote that it was "probably the best album [released] between the first and second phases of Wire". Richard Cook of the British music magazine NME was less positive, calling the album, along with Newman's subsequent work Provisionally Entitled the Singing Fish, "erratic and needlessly fussy affairs that creak under pretensions to alchemy when studio pottering is nearer the mark."

== Legacy ==
"Not Me" and "Alone" were covered by This Mortal Coil on the albums It'll End in Tears and Filigree & Shadow, respectively. "S-S-S-Star Eyes" was covered by P-Model and released as a supplementary cassette to an issue of the band's fan club newsletter. "Alone" was used in the 1991 film The Silence of the Lambs.

== Track listing ==
All tracks are written by Colin Newman, except where noted

Side A
No.	Title	Writer(s)	Length
1.	"I've Waited Ages"		5:05
2.	"& Jury"	Newman; Desmond Simmons	2:47
3.	"Alone"	Graham Lewis; Newman	3:57
4.	"Order for Order"		2:44
5.	"Image"		4:18
6.	"Life on Deck"		3:12

Side B
No.	Title	Length
7.	"Troisieme"	4:09
8.	"S-S-S-Star Eyes"	2:09
9.	"Seconds to Last"	7:07
10.	"Inventory"	2:11
11.	"But No"	3:06
12.	"B"	2:58
Total length:		43:43

Additional tracks on CD release (1988)
No.	Title	Length
13.	"The Classic Remains"	3:52
14.	"Alone on Piano"	1:56
15.	"This Picture"	3:31
16.	"Not Me"	2:39
17.	"Don't Bring Reminders"	2:22
Total length:		58:03

== Personnel ==
- Colin Newman – guitar, vocals, album cover
- Desmond Simmons – bass guitar, guitar
- Mike Thorne – synthesizer, keyboards, production
- Robert Gotobed – drums
- Charles Bullen – clarinet on "Troisieme"

Technical

- A. Newman – album cover
- Harvey Goldberg – engineering
- Dennis Weinreich – engineering
- Steve Parker – engineering
- Malti Kidia – sleeve layout and typography
- Jack Skinner – cutting
