= Robin Rimbaud =

British electronic musician

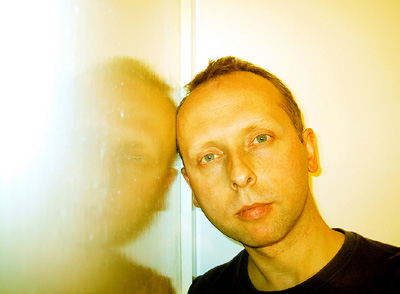
- Rimbaud in 2006

Background information
- Also known as: Scanner
- Born: 6 May 1964 (age 62); Southfields, London
- Genres: Electronic
- Occupations: Musician, writer, media critic, record producer
- Years active: 1982–present
- Labels: swim ~, Ash International, Touch Music
- Member of: Githead
- Website: scannerdot.com

Robin Rimbaud (born 6 May 1964) is a British electronic musician who works under the name Scanner due to his use of cell phone and police scanners in live performance. He is also a member of the band Githead with Wire's Colin Newman and Malka Spigel and Max Franken from Minimal Compact. Rimbaud is also a music/art critic, multi-media artist and record producer.

Rimbaud borrowed his stage name from the device he used in his early recordings. Like Boris Policeband, he picked up indeterminate radio and mobile phone signals in the airwaves and used them as an instrument in his compositions.

== Early life ==
Born in Southfields, London, Rimbaud was interested in avant garde literature, cinema and music while growing up. He was trained in piano from a young age and was exposed to the works of John Cage by his piano teacher at the age of 11. In his late teens Rimbaud recounted having listened to a copy of Brian Eno's On Land while his stereo equipment inadvertently picked up signal interference of a conversation over CB radio.

When he was a teenager his family was bereaved when his father was killed in a motorcycle accident. Later he attended Kingston University in Surrey, earning a degree in English (BA).

== Career ==
While attending university, he formed a musical project The Rimbaud Brothers with fellow student Tony Rimbaud, releasing cassette editions in the early 1980s, later becoming Dau Al Set with the addition of Chris Staley.

Rimbaud released the Peyrere compilation cassette album in 1986, featuring the work of Nurse with Wound, Derek Jarman, Current 93, Coil and Test Dept. That same year, he composed the soundtrack to a short film A Horse with No Name, directed by Phil Viner, shown at the London Film Festival.

Around 1992, Rimbaud came into possession of a scanner — having bought it from a friend who needed money — and began to experiment with integrating intercepted conversations into his music. His debut Scanner CD was released in 1992 on Ash International, a subsidiary label of London's Touch Music label. He continued to produce the first dozen releases with Mike Harding of Touch, including Scanner², Mass Observation, Blind, and Runaway Train, a real-time recording of the captivating radio contact between Alfie, controller of the line and Wesley, the driver of a runaway train. Location: New Brunswick, Canada, recorded 9 March 1948.

In 1994, Rimbaud produced one of the first webzines, I/O/D, in collaboration with Matthew Fuller and Graham Harwood. In 1998, he presented Surface Noise on a London bus, commissioned by Artangel, and won the Imaginaria 99 Award for Digital Arts, ICA London the following year. He re-soundtracked Jean-Luc Godard's Alphaville movie in a series of performances around the world, whilst playfully presenting 16 concerts in one evening in August 1999 using a series of Scanner look-alikes to perform in his absence. For 2003, he installed a permanent installation in Raymond Poincaré hospital in Garches, France as part of the bereavement suite Channel of Flight. In 2004, Tate Modern commissioned Sound Surface in collaboration with Stephen Vitiello as their first sonic arts work. In the same year, he composed Europa 25, an alternative National Anthem for Europe that was freely distributed via 10,000 CDs and a website.

He has continued to collaborate with classical musicians – Michael Nyman for Ars Electronica in Linz, Austria, Musique Nouvelles in Belgium for their 'Play Along' collaborative string quartet, and opera singer Patricia Rozario for a new untitled work in 2007.

From 1994–2000, he set up and "curated" The Electronic Lounge music club at London's ICA, where these monthly sessions presented nights of music in a social environment. Nights included presentations with the record companies Warp Records, Irdial, Ninja Tune, Touch, Mego, Leaf Records and many others.

Working with choreographer Wayne McGregor, he created Nemesis for Random Dance in 2002, Detritus for Ballet Rambert in 2003, and Qualia for the Royal Ballet in 2004. He continues to work with dance, with new works for Shobana Jeyasingh and Siobhan Davies in 2007. In 2006 he created the sound for Merce Cunningham's E:vent at London's Barbican theatre.

In 2006, he created Night Haunts, a monthly online artwork, working with writer Sukhdev Sandhu and designers Mind Unit. He sound-designed Aitan Errusi's new British horror film Reverb. In 2007 he soundtracked British filmmaker Steve McQueen's film installation Gravesend, at the 52nd Venice Biennial.

In 2008, he was President of Honour at the Qwartz Music Awards in Paris, and scored the musical comedy Kirikou & Karaba in Paris, which was later released on DVD (EMI). He premiered his six-hour performance show, Of Air and Eye at the Royal Opera House London in late 2008, and sound-designed the new Philips Wake-Up Light with Philips Electronics in NL, a lamp to wake you up with natural light and sound.

In 2009, he showed Atlantida, an HD film installation at the Canary Islands Biennial, created in collaboration with filmmaker Olga Mink. In the summer of 2009 he composed the soundtrack to the opening ceremony of the World Swimming Championships in Rome, broadcast in 164 countries, and soundtracked the new Samburg Corby telephone campaign in Italy.

In 2005, Rimbaud was a contributing curator 'J’en rêve' at Fondation Cartier Paris, and in 2006, jointly curated the video art exhibition 'Mobile' at Espace Landowski Paris.

His BBC Radio production of Jean Cocteau's The Human Voice won the Prix Marulic Award and recently, he won First Prize Neptun Water Prize for his installation Wishing Well in Austria, in collaboration with Austrian artist Katarina Matiasek. In 1998, he became 'Professor Scanner' at John Moores University in Liverpool. In 2009 he became Visiting Professor at University College Falmouth UK, and Visiting Professor at Le Fresnoy National Centre for Contemporary Arts in Tourcoing France.

Rimbaud has collaborated with Harald Bode (posthumously).

He contributed a chapter to Sound Unbound: Sampling Digital Music and Culture (The MIT Press, 2008) edited by Paul D. Miller a.k.a. DJ Spooky. In 2010 Rimbaud working with The Post Modern Jazz Quartet on Blink of an Eye with a very subtle touch, embedding his sounds into those of the New York jazz ensemble seamlessly as critics observed.

In 2013, Rimbaud dueted with Alexandra Strunin on the song "Robot" from her EP called Stranger released on 29 October 2013.

In 2015, Rimbaud collaborated with textile designer Ismini Samanidou on the "Weave Waves" project for the Sound Matters exhibition produced by the UK Crafts Council with David Toop. "Weave Waves" comprises two textile pieces whose patterns encode recordings of the artists' breathing (the larger piece) and ambient city sounds from London and Manchester (the smaller piece).

In 2023, Rimbaud remixed Kenneth James Gibson’s track Small Triumphs And Deep Disappointments for the remix album Further Translations on Gibson’s label Meadows Heavy Recorders. Also featured on the album is Jack Dangers, Brian McBride, Christopher Willits, and others.

== Political views ==
In December 2019, along with 42 other leading cultural figures, Rimbaud signed a letter endorsing the Labour Party under Jeremy Corbyn's leadership in the 2019 general election. The letter stated that "Labour's election manifesto under Jeremy Corbyn's leadership offers a transformative plan that prioritises the needs of people and the planet over private profit and the vested interests of a few."

== Selected discography ==
=== Albums (as Robin Rimbaud) ===
- Sub Rosa Live Sessions (Sub Rosa, 1996)
- The Garden Is Full of Metal (Homage to Derek Jarman) (Sub Rosa, 1997)

=== Albums (as Scanner) ===
- Scanner (Ash International, 1993)
- Scanner 2 (Ash International, 1993)
- Mass Observation (Ash International, 1994)
- Sulphur (Sub Rosa, 1995)
- Spore (New Electronica, 1995)
- Delivery (Earache, 1997)
- StopStarting (Audio Research Editions, 1998)
- Sound for Spaces (Sub Rosa, 1998)
- Lauwarm Instrumentals (Sulphur, 1999)
- Diary (Sulphur, 2000)
- Technorama (Digital Vision, 2001)
- 52 Spaces (Bette, 2002)
- Nemesis: Original Score For Random Dance Company (Bette, 2002)
- Warhol's Surfaces (Intermedium, 2003)
- Double Fold (rx:tx, 2003)
- Reason by Heart, Sleep by Twilight (BineMusic, 2005)
- The Radiance of a Thousand Suns Burst Forth at Once (Steamin' Soundworks, 2005)
- Messe, Macht Des Klangs / Klang Der Macht (KunstRäume Leipzig, 2005)
- Consegnaci, bambina, i tuoi occhi (Horus, 2009)
- Rockets, Unto the Edges of Edges (BineMusic, 2009)
- In-Between (Bette, 2011)
- Voyager: Amongst Others (Atelier, 2011)
- Pavillon D'Armide / Amarant (Bette, 2011)
- timelapse/(Mnemosyne) (Bette, 2011)
- Colofon & Compendium 1991-1994 (Sub Rosa, 2012)
- Electronic Garden (BineMusic, 2014)
- Fibolae (Pomperipossa, 2017)
- The Great Crater (Glacial Movements, 2017)
- The Signal of a Signal of a Signal (Touched, 2019)
- Trawl (Aquarellist, 2020)
- An Ascent (DiN, 2020)
- Alchemeia (Alltagsmusik, 2024)
- The Phenol Tapes (Alltagsmusik, 2024)

== See also ==
- Boris Policeband
- Ambient Music
- Minimal music
- Electronic Music
- Noise Music
- Chip music
- Circuit bending
- Sonic artifact
