= Max Franken =

- Origin: Amsterdam, the Netherlands
- Genres: Alternative rock, post-punk, experimental rock
- Occupation: Drummer
- Years active: 1980–present
- Labels: swim ~, Crammed
- Website: www.githead.com

Max Franken is the drummer of Minimal Compact, a rock band that achieved success in Europe in the 1980s. Born in Amsterdam, he is the only non-Israeli member of the band.

He is also a member of Githead along with Colin Newman, Robin Rimbaud (Scanner) and Minimal Compact bassist Malka Spigel.
