= Swim (record label) =

British record label founded in 1993

- Founded: 1993
- Founder: Malka Spigel, Colin Newman
- Genre: Ambient music, electronic music
- Country of origin: UK
- Location: London
- Official website: http://www.swimhq.com/

Swim (styled swim ~ the tilde "~" is part of the written name, but is not pronounced) is a record label founded in 1993, and jointly run, by Wire guitarist and singer Colin Newman, and Minimal Compact bass player and singer Malka Spigel. The label has published various solo projects and collaborations by Spigel and Newman, most notably Githead, a group formed on the occasion of the label's tenth anniversary, as well as music by a number of indie bands such as Ronnie and Clyde, Lobe and Silo.

== Founding ==
Spigel and Newman met when Newman produced a record by Spigel's band Minimal Compact. They launched the Swim label after they married and started a family: "We have a young child. We had a stark choice when he was born, as we were both in touring bands, between being absentee parents or finding a way to work together while bringing up a child. We chose the latter." Abandoning conventional song formats, they found that ambient music and techno lent themselves to working from their home studio. "In the beginning, we tried to make some song/electronic hybrid", they told CMJ New Music. "We felt tied down by the song structure, and broke free of that with Immersion" – a "Spigel/Newman instrumental electronic collaboration" which released an album titled Oscillating as well as a series of remixes by a number of techno artists.

== Music output ==
Swim began by publishing "understated, neo-minimalist electronic music", its first two releases being Rosh Ballata by Spigel and Tree by Oracle. Billing itself as a "post-everything" label it boasted what Dusted Magazine described as "a diverse group of musicians working primarily at the atmospheric, melodic end of the electronic spectrum [...], often operating at the interface of digital and organic musics, bringing traces of a rock sensibility – as well as traditional rock instrumentation – to bear on their electronica"; their musical output ran "the stylistic gamut from beatless soundscapes to relatively conventional song-based pop to beat-heavy grooves". The label published several samplers of its work, beginning with Water Communication in 1997, which was followed by Swim Team #1 in 2000 and Swim Team #2 in 2003. These featured Swim acts such as Symptoms (Klaus Ammitzbøll), Ronnie and Clyde, Lobe, and Danish trio Silo in addition to Newman and Spigel and their son Ben a.k.a. "Bumpy".

In 2004, Newman and Spigel established Githead, comprising Newman and Spigel along with electronic artist Robin Rimbaud, who had contributed to the Immersion remix project and done much to encourage Swim in its early days; they were joined in 2005 by Minimal Compact drummer Max Franken. Githead saw the label move towards a more guitar-based sound. The group was originally meant to be a one-off live act for the label's tenth anniversary celebration, but developed into a touring and recording act when Spigel, Newman and Rimbaud first jammed together in preparation for the event and realised that "we had a band". The group's first EP Headgit was written, recorded and mixed in the Swim studio in London and was followed by the albums Profile (2005), Art Pop (2007) and Landing (2009), all released through the Swim label.

== Reception ==
The 2000 Swim Team #1 sampler was positively reviewed in NME, achieving an 8 out of 10 rating. The 2003 Swim Team #2 sampler was described by Dusted Magazine as "a near-perfect sampler", offering "both quantity and quality and introduc[ing] listeners to an array of exciting musicians. If, by the end of the CD, your interest isn't piqued and you don't feel the need to seek out further material by some of these artists, then you may need your ears syringed."

== Interviews and writings ==
- "Production Lines: Colin Newman". Article by Colin Newman on Swim published in Sound on Sound music magazine (May 1994)
- The Creative Process: Interview Series. Colin Newman interviewed by Aaron Prevots, Ph. D., Southwestern University

== Associated acts ==
- Colin Newman
- Malka Spigel
- Earth (Newman & Spigel)
- Immersion (Newman & Spigel)
- Intens (Newman & Spigel)
- Oscillating (Newman & Spigel)
- Githead (Newman, Spigel, Rimbaud, Franken)
- Oracle (Newman, Spigel, Samy Birnbach)
- Akatombo
- dol-lop
- g-man
- Lobe
- Pablo's Eye
- Ronnie & Clyde
- Silo
- Symptoms (Klaus Ammitzbøll)
