= Malka Spigel =

Israeli musician and artist (born 1954)

Malka Spigel מלכה שפיגל
- Also known as: Maya Newman
- Born: 19 July 1954 (age 72)
- Origin: Tel Aviv, Israel
- Genres: Alternative rock, post-punk, experimental rock, techno, post-rock, electronic
- Occupations: Musician, photographer
- Instruments: Bass, vocals, keyboards, lomo camera
- Years active: 1980–present
- Labels: swim ~, Crammed
- Website: http://www.mayanewman.com

Malka Spigel (Hebrew: מלכה שפיגל; born 19 July 1954) is a Brighton-based Israeli musician and artist. She was a founding member of the Israeli-Belgian rock band Minimal Compact. She has also worked as a solo musician and as a visual artist, exhibiting in prominent venues such as The Irish Museum of Modern Art and the Royal Festival Hall. She is a member of Githead along with husband Colin Newman, Robin Rimbaud and fellow Minimal Compact refugee Max Franken.

== Biography ==
Spigel fell into the music and art world as a Tel-Aviv exile in early 1980s Amsterdam. Minimal Compact, which she co-founded with Berry Sakharof (one of Israel's highly respected rock stars) and Samy Birnbach (latterly DJ Morpheus), and in which she played bass and contributed occasional vocals, pioneered a minimal post-punk/punk-funk sound that over seven years attracted a large, enthusiastic audience in continental Europe and beyond. During the period 1981 to 1988 the band grew to include drummer Max Franken (now Githead's drummer) and guitarist Rami Fortis (notorious in Israel as its first punk) and were associated with many esteemed musicians, recording with Tuxedomoon's Peter Principle, Wire's Colin Newman, who produced one of their albums, and John Fryer (This Mortal Coil), sound-tracking ballet by choreographer Pierre Droulers, and having a song (sung by Malka) in the Wim Wenders movie Wings of Desire.

In 1985, Spigel met Wire's Colin Newman – then producing Minimal's "Raging Souls". Malka worked with Colin Newman starting in 1986 with "Commercial Suicide" and its follow-up "It Seems". The couple married in 1986 and moved to London in 1992, setting up the swim ~ label, initially to release their own projects (Oracle, Malka's debut Rosh Balata, and Immersion), but later to release the work of other artists. In 1996, Immersion made an installation at The Irish Museum of Modern Art in Dublin, which set Malka on a path of realising herself as a visual artist in addition to being a musician. During the period 2000 to 2002 she gained a degree in fine art, specialising in video and photography. She has since made video work with Immersion (most famously seen at the Royal Festival Hall, London) and video clips for Vapourspace, Minimal Compact and Wire. She also has an extensive collection of photography work, primarily created with a lomo LCA camera, which has gained her pre-eminence in the lomo & flickr community.

In 2004, Spigel, Newman and Robin Rimbaud founded Githead, with Spigel playing bass, and all three members sharing vocal duties. Music journalist Joe Tangari, writing for pitchfork.com, reflected on Spigel's contribution to Githead's first album Headgit, released in 2004: "Spigel's bass thumps and bounces, giving Newman's detached vocal leads a funky underpinning and helping to humanize the rhythms provided by something called the Beat Monster. ... It's actually not difficult to imagine A Bell Is a Cup-era Wire coming up with something like this, though Spigel's deft funkiness – especially on "Profile" – helps set the two sounds apart some."

In 2012 Spigel released "Every Day Is Like the First Day", a collaboration with Newman. Another solo album, Gliding, came out in 2014.

== Discography ==
=== Solo releases ===
- Rosh Ballata Swim ~ (1993)
- Hide Swim ~ (1997)
- My Pet Fish Swim ~ (1997)
- Every Day Is Like The First Day Swim ~ (2012)
- Gliding Swim ~ (2014)

=== Collaborative albums ===
- Minimal Compact albums see Minimal Compact discography
- Oracle Tree Swim ~ (1994)
- immersion Oscillating Swim ~ (1994)
- immersion Full Immersion (Remixes) Swim ~ (1995)
- Colin Newman Bastard Swim ~ (1997)
- immersion Low Impact Swim ~ (1999)
- Spigel * Newman * Colin * Malka Live Swim ~ (1999)
- Githead Headgit Swim ~ (2004)
- Githead Profile Swim ~ (2005)
- Githead Art Pop Swim ~ (2007)
- Githead Landing Swim ~ (2009)
- Githead Waiting For A Sign Swim ~ (2014)

=== Other notable collaborations ===
- Seven Codes with Rami Fortis (cassette only) Seven Codes (1981)
- Jean Conflict with Rami Fortis, Jean-Jaques Goldberg and Ronen Ben Tal Third Ear (1986)
- Colin Newman Commercial Suicide Crammed (1986)
- Colin Newman It Seems Crammed (1988)
- Foreign Affair East On Fire (lyrics for three tracks) Crammed (1989)
- Tuxedomoon You (vocals on one track) Crammed (1990)
- Hector Zazou Sahara Blue (vocals on one track) Crammed (1991)
- V/A Dugga, Dugga, Dugga - Various Artists Play Drill (one track) WMO (1998)
- Dictaphone M=Addiction (vocals) City Centre Offices

== See also ==
- List of women bass guitarists
