= Bruce Gilbert =

British musician (born 1946)

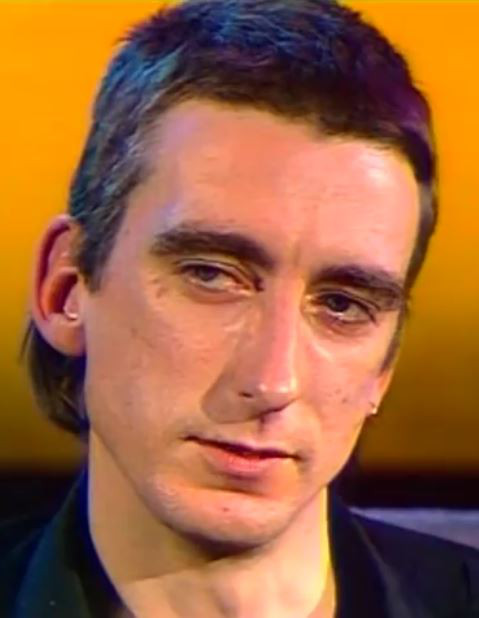

Background information
- Born: Bruce Clifford Gilbert; 18 May 1946 (age 80); Watford, Hertfordshire, England
- Occupation: Musician
- Instrument: Guitar
- Labels: Mute Records; Editions Mego; Touch Music

Bruce Clifford Gilbert (born 18 May 1946) is an English musician. One of the founding members of the influential and experimental art punk band Wire, he branched out into electronic music, performance art, music production, and DJing during the band's extended periods of inactivity. He left Wire in 2004, and has since been focusing on solo work and collaborations with visual artists and fellow experimental musicians.

== Education and early career ==
Gilbert studied graphic design at Leicester Polytechnic until 1971; he then became an abstract painter, taking on part-time jobs to help support himself. In 1975, he was hired as an audio-visual aids technician and slide-photography librarian at Watford College of Art and Design. Borrowing oscillators from the Science department, Gilbert started experimenting with tape loops and delays at the recording studio set up by his predecessor. Together with Colin Newman and Angela Conway, who were students at Watford at the time, Gilbert formed a short-lived group called Overload. Newman and Gilbert were joined by Graham Lewis and Robert Gotobed in the summer of 1976, and started practising and performing as Wire.

Gilbert, who always considered Wire a living sculpture rather than a musical project, fondly recalls early punk gigs as events where the audience, far from being mere consumers, became part of a shared dynamic experience: "I viewed it as a bit of a laboratory, not musically but culturally, because the people were experimenting with themselves: with their behaviour, their appearance and their clothes. Everything was up for grabs."

Wire released three albums between 1976 and 1979, Pink Flag, Chairs Missing and 154, before temporarily disbanding after a show at London's Electric Ballroom at the start of 1980. At this time, Gilbert formed a series of bands/projects with Wire's bassist, Graham Lewis, including Cupol, Dome, P'o, and Duet Emmo. Gilbert's collaborations with Lewis were experimental, featuring ambient music and found sounds. Dome performed at art galleries with visual displays that allowed audience interactivity. Gilbert and Lewis performed with tubes made of paper over their heads, thus restricting their vision. Artist Russell Mills frequently collaborated with Dome. In 1980, Gilbert and Lewis produced The The's debut single "Black & White/Controversial Subject" for 4AD, as well as the single "Drop/So" by A.C. Marias for their own Dome label. Between 8 and 31 August 1981, Gilbert, Lewis, and Mills took over London's Waterloo Gallery and produced MZUI, an interactive audio-visual installation where visitors were encouraged to play a number of instruments created by the artists from objects found on the site. The MZUI album, released by Cherry Red in May 1982, contains two untitled pieces based on recordings from the venue, finishing with the looped and distorted voice of Marcel Duchamp, whom Gilbert considers a key influence. Gilbert's experimental piece "Children", released in 1983 by Touch, features his parents talking about significant events from their childhood.

== Later career ==
Between 1984 and 1991, Gilbert was commissioned to create music for a variety of film and modern dance projects, by, among others, Michael Clark, Aletta Collins, and Ashley Page, with excerpts appearing on his albums This Way (1984), The Shivering Man (1987) (both combined on CD as This Way to the Shivering Man), Insiding (1991) and Music for Fruit (1991).

Wire re-entered the public arena on 7 June 1985 with a performance at the Museum of Modern Art, Oxford, and Gilbert contributed sounds, lyrics, and occasional vocals to the various albums, EPs, and singles released by the band between November 1986 and February 1993.

In 1989, Gilbert co-produced the A.C. Marias album One of Our Girls (Has Gone Missing), sharing author credits with Angela Conway for 10 original songs (the album also contains a cover version of Canned Heat's "Time Was", first released in 1988 as a single featuring Conway, Gilbert, Barry Adamson and Rowland S. Howard).

Since the 1990s, Gilbert has appeared at London techno clubs under the name DJ Beekeeper, often deejaying inside a garden shed above the dancefloor. He has been quoted saying that being a DJ was just an excuse to "manipulate other people's music" – such projects include remixing "National Grid Pt 1 and 2" by the group Disinformation for their double CD Antiphony released on Ash International in 1997.

In March 1996, he released Ab Ovo, his first solo album not to result from external dance or film commissions. It was described in The Wire as "a forceful piece of work which sounds like nothing else around."

Wire reconvened in London for a one-off performance of "Drill" to celebrate Gilbert's 50th birthday in May 1996. In January 2000, Gilbert teamed up once more with Graham Lewis, and the duo contributed the sound installation Alarm to the Audible Light exhibition at the Museum of Modern Art, Oxford. Wire entered their third incarnation on 26 February 2000 with a performance at the Royal Festival Hall. In 2002, Gilbert wrote and recorded the soundtrack for "London Orbital", a film by Chris Petit and Iain Sinclair based on Sinclair's psychogeographical exploration of the M25 motorway. As part of the project, Gilbert and Wire performed live at the premiere of the film and Sinclair's book at the Barbican on 25 October 2002. Gilbert left Wire in 2004, after the release of the Send album, pursuing solo projects and collaborations with visual and sound artists ever since.

Gilbert's 2004 album Ordier is a collection of excerpts from a 1996 live performance. 2006 saw him contribute to Susan Stenger's Soundtrack for an Exhibition within the eponymous project curated by Mathieu Coupland that brought together artists from the realms of music, fine art, and film at the Musée d'art contemporain de Lyon. In 2009, Gilbert released Oblivio Agitatum, which he recorded entirely at home. In a review for Brainwashed, music journalist Creaig Dunton concluded that "even with his long silence, Bruce Gilbert is still an expert at shaping mini dramas and landscapes out of the raw clay of electronic music."

Revisiting his collaboration with Pan Sonic as IBM in 2001, Gilbert paired up with Mika Vainio in May 2011 at the Netaudio London festival for an exclusively commissioned live performance. His 2011 recording, "Monad", was published by Touch as a vinyl-only 7-inch single on 8 August.

In October 2011, Gilbert's short story "Sliding Off the World", first released as a spoken-word piece set to atmospheric noise on the CD Touch 25 in June 2006, was published in the anthology Murmurations by Nicholas Royle (Two Ravens Press, ISBN 978-1-906120-59-7).

Gilbert's latest release, Diluvial, was launched at Beaconsfield Art Works in London on 13 September 2013. A collaboration between Gilbert and BAW (sound and visual artists Naomi Siderfin and David Crawforth), Diluvial is a seven-piece reflection on climate change and creation stories.

== Selected discography ==
=== with Wire ===
See: Wire discography

=== with Cupol ===
- Like This For Ages EP (1980), 4AD

=== Gilbert and Lewis ===
- 3R4 mini-LP (1980), 4AD
- "Ends with the Sea" (1980), 4AD

=== with Dome ===
- Dome 1 (1980), Dome Records
- Dome 2 (1981), Dome Records
- Dome 3 (1981), Dome Records
- Will You Speak This Word (1982), Unition
- Yclept (1999), WMO

Compilations & reissues

- DOME 1-4+5, 5-LP box set (December 2011), Editions Mego

=== with A.C. Marias ===
- "Drop/So", single (1980), Dome Records
- "Just Talk/No Talk", 12" single (1986), Mute
- "Time Was/Some Thing", 12" single (1989), Mute
- One of Our Girls (Has Gone Missing), album (1989), Mute
- "One of Our Girls/Vicious", 12" single (1990), Mute

=== Gilbert, Lewis and Mills ===
- Mzui (Waterloo Gallery) (1982), Cherry Red
- Pacific/Specific (1995), WMO

=== with Duet Emmo ===
- "Or So It Seems", single (1982), Mute
- Or So It Seems, album (1983), Mute

=== with P'o ===
- Whilst Climbing Thieves Vie for Attention, album (1983), Court

=== Gilbert/Hampson/Kendall ===
Orr, album (1996), Mute (Parallel Series)

=== with Iain Sinclair ===
Downriver, CD (1998), King Mob

=== Bruce Gilbert – Ron West ===
"frequency variation", 12" single (1998), Sähkö Recordings

=== with rude mechanic ===
rude mechanic, 2 x CD, (recorded 1996, released 1999), Piano

=== gilbertpossstenger ===
manchesterlondon, album (2000), WMO

=== with IBM ===
The Oval Recording, album + 7" single (2001), Mego

=== with Souls on Board ===
Souls on Board, cassette (2009), The Tapeworm

=== with Meltaot ===
Souls on Board, vinyl LP (2010), Ash International

=== with BAW (Naomi Siderfin and David Crawforth) ===
Diluvial, CD (2013) Touch Music

=== Solo ===
==== Albums ====
- To Speak (1983), Dome
- This Way (1984), Mute
- The Shivering Man (1987), Mute
- Insiding (1991), Mute
- Music for Fruit (1991), Mute
- Ab Ovo (1996), Mute
- In Esse (1997), Mute
- The Haring (1997), WMO
- Ordier (2004), Table of the Elements
- Oblivio Agitatum (2009), Editions Mego
- Ex Nihilo (2018), Editions Mego

Compilations & reissues

- This Way to the Shivering Man (1987), Mute
- Mesmer Variations, 2 x CD (1995), Ash International
- RRR 500, LP (1998), RRRecords
- Antitrade, CD (1999), Ash International
- Audible Light, CD (2000), Education and Exhibition Dept. at The Museum of Modern Art, Oxford.
- This Way (25th Anniversary Reissue) (2009), Editions Mego
- The Shivering Man (Enhanced) (2011), Editions Mego

==== Singles ====
- "Instant Shed Vol. 1" (1995), Sub Pop
- "Instant Shed Vol. 2" (1996), Ash International
- "Monad" (2011), Touch
