= Colin Newman =

English musician and record producer (born 1954)

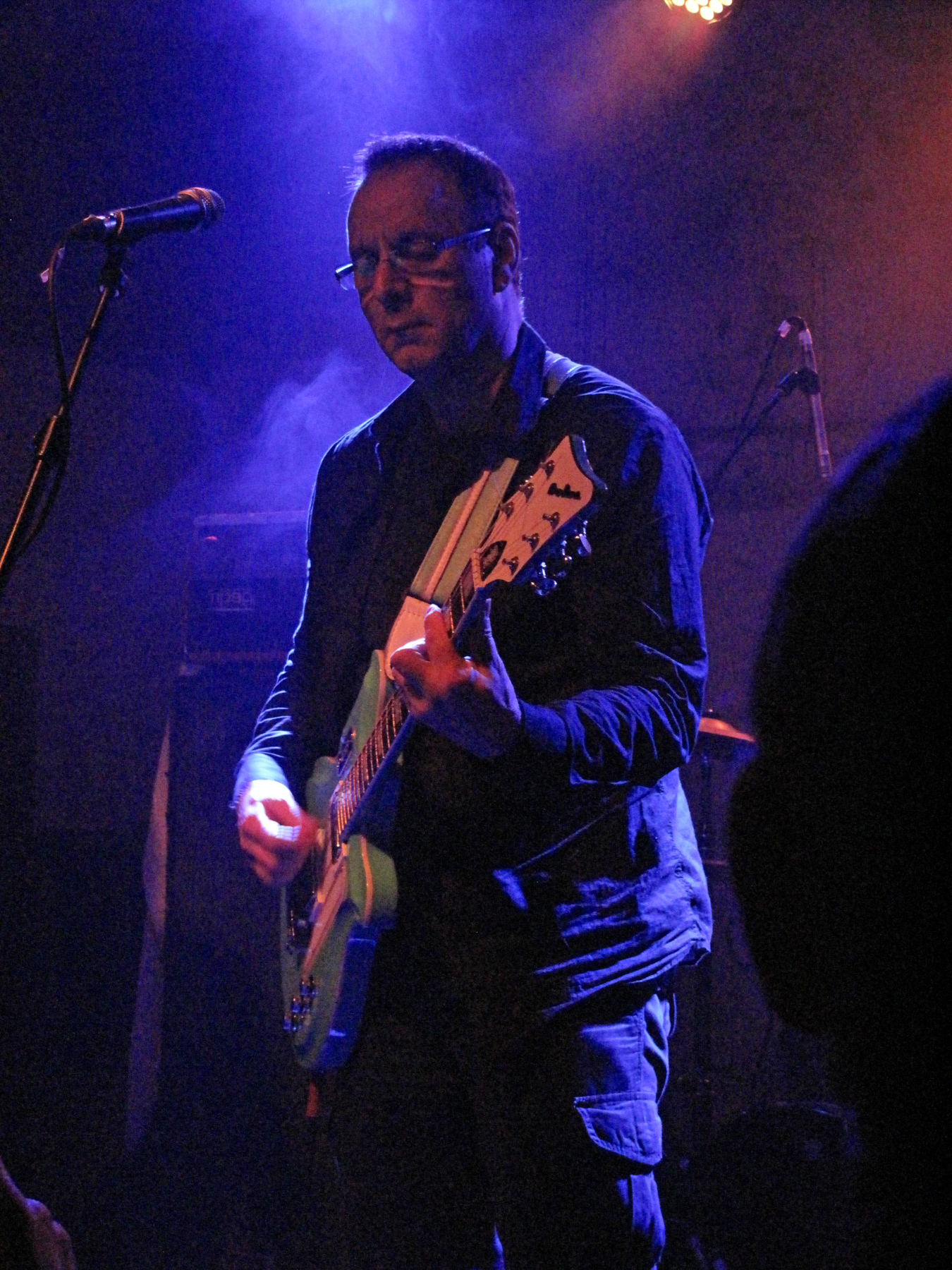
- Newman performing in November 2011

Background information
- Born: 16 September 1954 (age 71); Salisbury, Wiltshire, England
- Origin: London, England
- Genres: Punk rock; art punk; post-punk; experimental rock; electronic; alternative rock
- Instruments: Vocals; guitar
- Years active: 1976–present
- Labels: Swim ~; Crammed; 4AD; Beggars Banquet Records; Sentient Sonics

Colin John Newman (born 16 September 1954) is an English musician, record producer and record label owner. He is best known as the primary vocalist and songwriter for the post-punk band Wire.

== Early life ==
Newman was born in Salisbury, Wiltshire in 1954 and grew up in Newbury, Berkshire. He later attended the Watford School of Art.

== Music career ==
In 1976 Newman formed the band Wire and was its main songwriter, singer and guitarist. Their first performance was on 19 January 1977 at the Roxy nightclub in London. At the start, the band was considered a part of London's punk rock scene but later reached critical acclaim for their massive influence on post-punk, new wave and alternative rock. When the band temporarily split in 1980, Newman pursued a solo career. His first solo album, A-Z, was released in 1980 on the Beggar's Banquet record label. The album veered from extremely skewed pop to more mainstream numbers, such as "Order for Order", which was compared by some to Gary Numan. A track from the demos for this LP (but not included on the original vinyl release), "Not Me", was covered by This Mortal Coil on their It'll End in Tears LP; This Mortal Coil then covered the A-Z track "Alone" on their second album Filigree & Shadow. Newman's second LP, the entirely instrumental Provisionally Entitled the Singing Fish, in which all the tracks were titled for numbered fish, was released on the 4AD Records label in 1981. A third LP, Not To, which along with original compositions reworked a number of tracks originally written for Wire, was released in 1982 on 4AD.

Following this, Newman travelled to India to collect sound recordings before rejoining Wire in 1984.

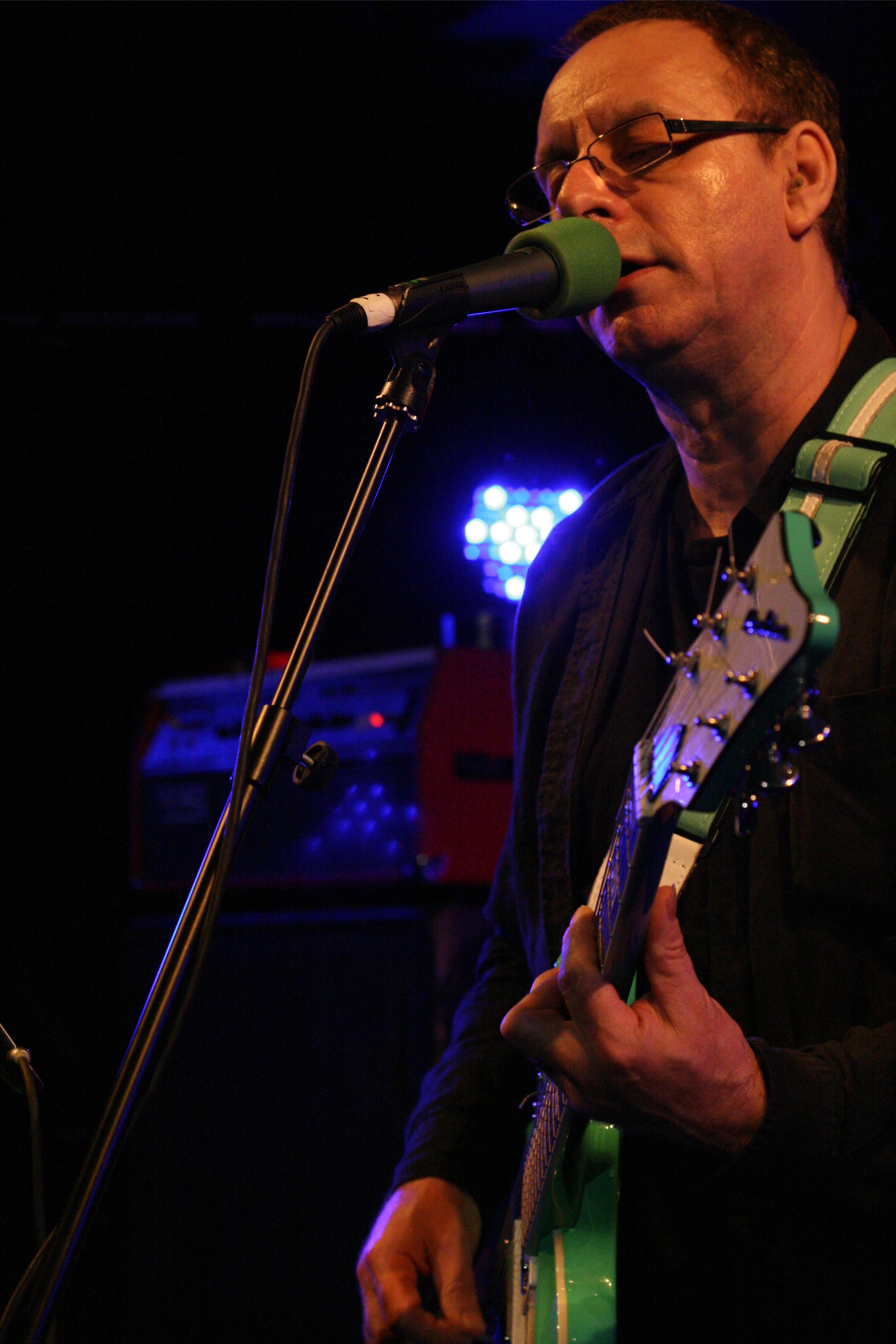
Colin Newman, 2011

In 1986, another solo LP, Commercial Suicide, was released on the Crammed Discs label. A massive change in style for Newman, the album is reflective and highly orchestrated. His next LP, It Seems, followed a similar path, albeit with far more use of sequencers – something Newman would continue to work with for a number of years. Both Crammed albums featured Malka Spigel who has been included in all subsequent solo and collaborative work.

Newman's only other de facto solo outing was the mid-1990s release Bastard, an almost entirely instrumental release with tracks largely built from guitar loops and samples. Released on his own label, Swim ~, the first pressing of the album was packaged with a free copy of Newman's four-track Voice EP. Despite Newman's name being on the cover, he says these releases, along with several others on Swim ~, are essentially collaborative efforts with his wife and musical partner, Malka Spigel.

Newman's song "Alone" made an appearance in the 1991 film The Silence of the Lambs in a scene in which the character Buffalo Bill is sewing in a basement. This song was also covered by This Mortal Coil on their Filigree & Shadow LP.

Newman has produced, arranged and mixed various other artists. These include Virgin Prunes, Parade Ground, Minimal Compact, Alain Bashung, Silo & Lobe on the production and arrangement side and Hawkwind, Dead Man Ray, Fennesz, Polysics and Celebricide on the mix side. He has also mixed all new Wire releases since 2000.

Since 2004, Newman has worked with Githead, a quartet composed of Newman, Spigel, Max Franken, and Robin Rimbaud. Newman has run the Pinkflag label for Wire since 2000. Immersion re-emerged in 2016. Newman also re-released his first three solo albums on Swim ~ sub-label Sentient Sonics in 2016.

== Personal life ==
Newman and his wife have lived in Brighton since 2014.

== Discography ==
=== Solo albums ===
- A-Z (Beggars Banquet, 1980; Sentient Sonics reissue, 2016)
- Provisionally Entitled the Singing Fish (4AD, 1981; Sentient Sonics reissue, 2016)
- Not To (4AD, 1982; Sentient Sonics reissue, 2016)
- Commercial Suicide (Crammed Discs, 1986)
- It Seems (Crammed Discs, 1988)
- Bastard (Swim ~, 1997)

=== Solo singles and EPs ===
- "B" (Beggars Banquet, 1980)
- "Inventory" (Beggars Banquet, 1981)
- "We Means We Starts" (4AD, 1982)
- CN1 (4AD, 1982)
- "Feigned Hearing" (Crammed, 1986)
- "Interview" (Crammed, 1987)
- "Better Later Than Never" (Crammed, 1988)
- Voice (Swim ~, 1994)

=== Collaborative albums and mini albums ===
- Malka Spigel Rosh Ballata (Swim ~, 1993)
- Oracle Tree (Swim ~, 1994)
- immersion Oscillating (Swim ~, 1994)
- immersion Full Immersion (Remixes) (Swim ~, 1995)
- Malka Spigel Hide (Swim ~, 1997)
- Malka Spigel My Pet Fish (Swim ~, 1997)
- immersion Low Impact (Swim ~, 1999)
- Spigel * Newman * Colin * Malka Live (Swim ~, 1999)
- Githead Headgit (Swim ~, 2004)
- Githead Profile (Swim ~, 2005)
- Githead Art Pop (Swim ~, 2007)
- Githead Landing (Swim ~, 2009)
- Malka Spigel Every Day is Like The First Day (Swim ~, 2012)
- Malka Spigel Gliding (Swim ~, 2014)
- Githead Waiting For A Sign (Swim ~, 2014)
- immersion Analogue Creatures Living On an Island (Swim ~, 2016)
- immersion Sleepless (Swim ~, 2018)
- immersion Nanocluster Vol. 1 (Swim ~, 2021)
- Malka Spigel Gliding + Hiding (Swim ~, 2022 - Compilation)
- immersion Nanocluster Vol. 2 (Swim ~, 2024)
