= Dante Boon =

Dutch composer and pianist

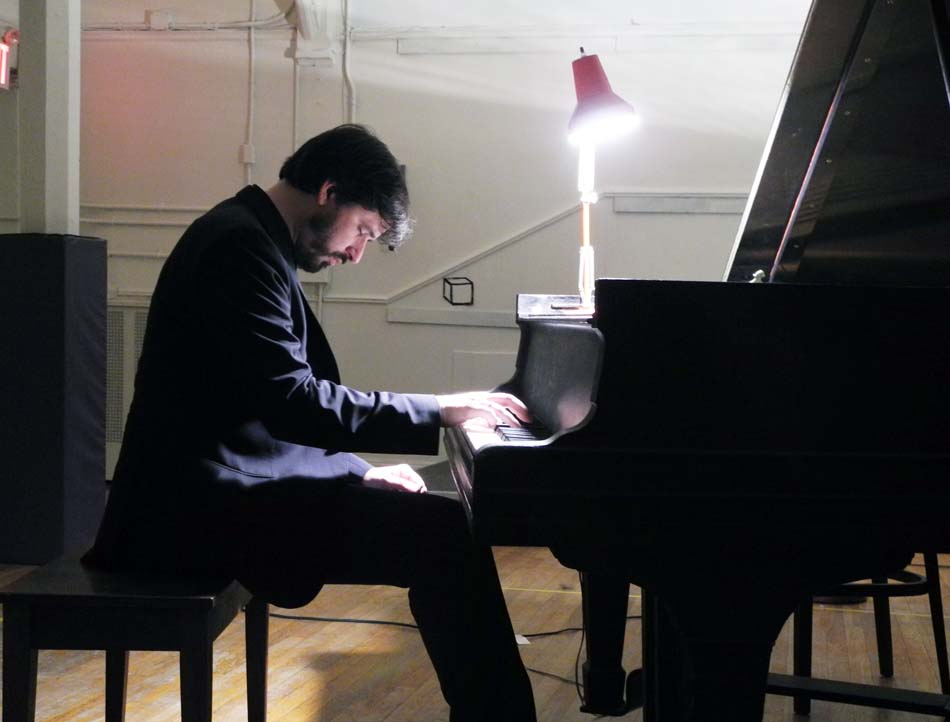

Background information
- Also known as: Dante Oei
- Born: July 15, 1973 (age 53); Haarlem, The Netherlands
- Genres: Experimental music, Wandelweiser
- Occupations: Composer, pianist
- Instrument: Piano
- Years active: 1987 – present
- Labels: Edition Wandelweiser Records, Another Timbre, Karnatic Lab Records
- Website: www.danteboon.com

Dante Boon (born 1973) is a Dutch composer and pianist. A member of the Wandelweiser composers collective, he is perhaps best known as an interpreter of experimental piano music. His own music has been performed internationally to wide acclaim.

== Biography ==
Dante Boon started his piano studies at age 14, with Willem Brons at the Sweelinck Conservatorium in Amsterdam. He studied composition with Diderik Wagenaar at the Royal Conservatory in The Hague. At the age of 24, he joined the Dutch rock band The Scene as a keyboardist and arranger.

A champion of experimental piano music and of Wandelweiser in particular, Boon has premiered over 100 works, many of which written specifically for him. He has performed at such venues as Constellation Chicago, Spectrum, Studio Z, Jeunesses Musicales du Canada, the ISCM Festival, cafe OTO, dotolim, Ftarri Festival, Musica Sacra Maastricht, Gaudeamus Muziekweek, De Link, Paradiso, and regularly at Amsterdam's underground venue Zaal 100 and Klangraum in Düsseldorf.

Boon has also been active as a concert organizer himself. He was one of the young composers who organized the Amsterdam concert series for new music Concerten Tot en Met between 1997 and 2004. He has also co-organized the series The Workshop/Maximum Clarity (with James Fulkerson) at Zaal 100, Sound Forum, a lecture series in Amsterdam featuring John Luther Adams, Clarence Barlow, Konrad Boehmer, Margriet Hoenderdos, Tom Johnson and other composers and since 2007 (with Stevko Busch) Pianolab Amsterdam, a showcase for Amsterdam pianists and their guests, at the Goethe-Institut. In 2017, Boon organized the Amsterdam Wandelweiser Festival, a four-day festival of Wandelweiser music. A second edition of the festival, again curated by Boon, was held at the Amsterdam venue Het Orgelpark in 2022.

He has recorded music by composers such as Tom Johnson, Philip Corner, Rozalie Hirs, John Cage, Jürg Frey, Antoine Beuger, Jack Callahan, Samuel Vriezen, Morton Feldman, Richard Ayres and Michael Manion. With pianist-composer Samuel Vriezen, he recorded Tom Johnson's Symmetries for piano four hands. In 2004, he premiered Johnson's Same or Different, commissioned by VPRO Radio.

Boon's compositions have been performed internationally, at such venues as Museo Reina Sofía, Goethe-Institut Amsterdam, Kunstraum, Alte Jazz-Schmiede, Old Stone House (Brooklyn), Willow Place Auditorium, Orgelpark, Stedelijk Museum, V2 Institute for the Unstable Media, Muziekgebouw aan 't IJ, the Royal Academy of Dutch language and literature, Huddersfield Contemporary Music Festival, The Wild Beast, Kultur & Kongresshaus Aarau, UCSB, and REDCAT. Performers of his music have included Ensemble Lucilin, Ensemble Sisyphe, the Barton Workshop, the Wandelweiser Composers Ensemble, The Same Ensemble, Diana Plays Perception, de ereprijs, Nederlands Vocaal Laboratorium, Ensamble NEO, Antoine Beuger, Jürg Frey, Michael Pisaro, Samuel Vriezen, Andrew McIntosh, Taylan Susam, Irene Kurka, Erik Carlson, Denis Sorokin, Carson Cooman, Luca Massaglia, Huw Morgan, Nicolas Horvath and Sergej Tchirkov. His scores are published by Edition Wandelweiser.

He is also known as a skillful arranger, having arranged music for The Scene and Wende, among others.

Since 2016, he has taken up conducting. In November of that year, he conducted Ensemble Sisyphe in a program of music by André Cormier, Tom Johnson, Taylan Susam, and himself.

He was a guest lecturer at the 13th Wiener Tage für zeitgenössische Klaviermusik hosted by the University of Music and Performing Arts Vienna. A three-concert musical portrait of Dante Boon was presented in 2012 at Düsseldorf's Klangraum. In 2013, he was a special guest at Michael Pisaro's Dog Star Orchestra festival of experimental music. In the same year, a retrospective of Boon's music was presented at the Los Angeles performance space the wulf. In 2016, Boon was featured as a composer and performer at Quatuor Bozzini's Performer's Kitchen.

He is married to Dutch actress Sytske van der Ster. Together, they have been running their own foundation for the production of music, theater and film, Stichting Boon en Ster. As Boon en Ster, they staged the Dutch premiere of Tom Johnson's chamber opera Sopranos Only at Dutch National Opera's Opera Forward Festival 2026.

== Musical works ==
John Eyles, writing for All About Jazz, has described Boon's works as "exquisite throughout, without a single wasted note or gesture to be heard." His CD clarinet (and piano), which features clarinetist Jürg Frey, was recommended by The New Yorker's Alex Ross and by Andy Hamilton in The Wire's Top 10 albums of contemporary music.

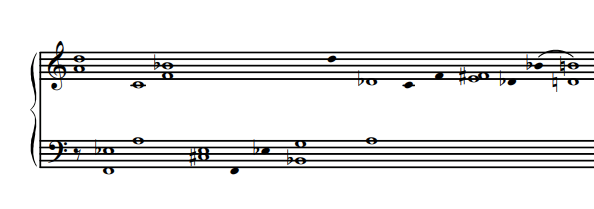
Excerpt from 14x

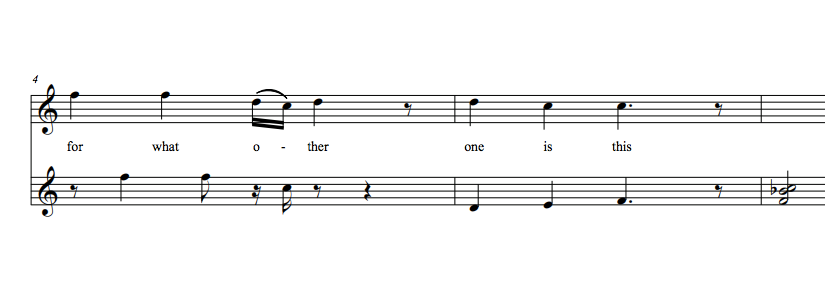
Excerpt from 2x Robert Creeley

Many of Boon's works are composed so as to give players room to discover their own way through the piece. His clarinet piece 3x, for example, consists of three staves of music containing pitches in three respective registers among which the clarinetist is free to move. In a program note, Michael Pisaro describes Boon's piano piece 14x as follows:

Although the piece is quite slow, and is seemingly a simple series of sustained chords with an occasional beautiful melodic gesture, the technique employed is actually very challenging. No pedal is used, therefore, in order maintain the mostly 10-note sounds all fingers of both hands are employed, holding down keys for the whole piece. What at first seems nearly impossible reveals itself to be ingeniously composed to be just possible.

In a review of Boon's 2 Delen (after Sam Sfirri), Paul Muller writes the following:

[A] subtle work featuring electric guitar and voice. The guitar plays a slow ascending scale and at certain points the voice joins. The pure pitches made for some beautiful sounds and overtones. When the voice and guitar met in unison a new cycle would start.

His vocal piece Mirte, a setting of the first three stanzas of Antoine Beuger's translation of the Spiritual Canticle by John of the Cross, has been described as an "inward psychological turn of a voice trying to sing to itself."

== Boon as a pianist ==
Dante Boon has been called a "magnificent" and "idiosyncratic" pianist, known for his "delicate touch" and "calm control." His performances of Komitas's piano music have been called "quieting" and "the highlight [of the concert]". Jay Batzner, writing for Sequenza21, describes Boon's recordings of Tom Johnson's music as "a delight to listen to." The New Yorker called him a pianist with an "uncommon affinity for music that demands patience, steady hands, and a subtle touch." National Sawdust's Steve Smith listed one of Boon's 2018 solo recitals in New York in his top 10 of memorable musical events.

Boon's debut album as a soloist, cage.frey.vriezen.feldman.ayres.johnson manion, was met with critical acclaim. Anthony Fiumara, writing for Trouw, notes that "[i]t is striking how self-evident [John Cage's] pointillist Etudes Australes sound under Boon's fingers," while characterizing Boon's playing as "murmurous lyricism." In a review for NRC Handelsblad, Jochem Valkenburg notes Boon's "warm, shrouded tone" and, singling out his interpretation of Morton Feldman's Last Pieces, calls it "objective yet affectionate…measured, pensive, yet vulnerable." Samuel Vriezen, writing in the liner notes to the album, similarly observes:

Two poles are important for Dante's playing. On the one hand he is drawn towards the musical discipline of the Cageian tradition and its concern with objectivity in sound. On the other hand, early Romanticism, particularly German song repertoire, is important to him. For many listeners, these poles may seem like opposites. For Dante, however, there is no contradiction. In his playing, precision of technique and conceptual clarity are expressions of a passionate engagement with sounds and their progression as melody.

His album with Jürg Frey, clarinet (and piano), containing Boon's own compositions, was similarly well received.

== Selected works ==
Solo
- 14x, piano (2007)
- Uitdrijving, voice and percussion (1 performer) (2009)
- 3x, clarinet (2011)
- Nov. (piano), piano (2011)
- Years, numbers, piano (2012)
- Duo (2h), piano (2017)
- Duo (accordion), accordion (2017)
- Duo (guitar), (electric) guitar (2018)
- Dean's piano, piano (2018)
- before traces, piano (2019)
- C#, piano (2019)
- You just don't argue, piano (2019)
- Gaza (bassoon), bassoon (2019)
- For What, piano (2020)
- mansa / Van Daan, piano and/or violin (2020)
- Dreamings, piano (2021)
- Nov. (3), organ (2021)
- (Huw), organ (2023)
- Organ duos, organ (2023)
- Berceuse, piano (2023)
- Nov. (three) (3), piano (2023)
- Gaza (piano), (toy) piano (2023)
- Gaza (strings), guitar (2024)
- Three times or more, piano (2024)
- Ispahaan, piano (2024)
- Genocide Joe, piano (2024)
- Voor Hans, organ (2024)
- Paul's piano, clarinet (2025)
- First Love, piano (2025)
- Jones Duos, organ (2025)
- Palestine Action, piano (2025)
- Narziß im Endakkord von Flöten, keyboard instrument (2026)

Duo

- sex (2), clarinet and cello (2006)
- Het sneeuwt maar het sneeuwt niet meer, 2 performers (2009)
- Wolken/veld, clarinet and piano (2011)
- Lied (je slaapt), clarinet and (toy) piano (2012)
- 2 Delen (after Sam Sfirri), 2 instruments (2012)
- 2 Spelers (after Antoine Beuger), 2 instruments (2012)
- Nov. (violin), violin and piano (2013)
- 3x (careful rests), guitar and piano (2014)
- O'Hare, clarinet and piano (2014)
- Duo (chorals), clarinet and trombone (2017)
- Duo (nocturne), guitar and cello (2017)
- Duo (trombone), trombone and piano (2018)
- Martha's Vineyard, glockenspiel and piano (2018)
- Gaza, 2 instruments (2018)
- Duo (stone harp), stone harp and melody instrument (2020)
- Duo: table & books, 2 performers (2020)
- Couple, piano four hands (2020)
- 20/21, 2 instruments (2021)
- Gone, marimba and organ (2024)
- Hochstein & McGurk, 2 voices (2024)
- toy piano 4h, toy piano four hands (2025)
- Duo (clarinet), clarinet and piano (2025)
Songs
- Ashbery (I Saw No Need), baritone (2003)
- 2x Robert Creeley, soprano and piano (2009)
- Mirte, female voice and keyboard (1 performer) (2011)
- the heart's size, low (female) voice, piano (2011)
- Om zachtjes in jezelf te zeggen, voice (2012)
- And/or, voice (2012)
- ruht nicht aus, voice and instrument (2015)
- Depression (Herbeck), (female) voice and piano (2017)
- Duo (commonalities), 2 voices (2017)
- Ta na sitàt, voice and piano (2020)
- Alone, voice and piano (2021)
- Drie jaar was ik ongeveer, speaking voice and piano (2023)
- The Garden, voice and violin (or kalimba) (2023)
- Poem / Short Story, voice (2023)
- Gaza (voice), voice & (toy) piano (2023)
- Dawn Song, voice (2024)
- They Called Me a Lioness, voice and piano (1 performer) (2024)
- Sois Gaza, speaking voice and piano (2025)
- passing through nature, voice and piano (2026)
- The language of dehumanization, 2 speaking voices (2026)

Ensemble

- sex, clarinet, violin, viola (2006)
- Nov., string quartet (2006)
- sex (3), 5 voices (2007)
- 12x, 3 instruments (2011)
- 17x, clarinet and 2 instruments (2011)
- Avellino, soprano and ensemble (2012)
- St Paul, ensemble (2014)
- Bacherach, voice, violin and piano (2014)
- Nov. (seven), ensemble (2016)
- Duo 1-5, ensemble (2017)
- Die Palmen von Beth-El, 4 performers (2018)
- the prayer's end, voice and ensemble (2015/2019)
- Nov. (three), clarinet, double bass and piano (2020)
- Nov. (koor), choir (SATB) (2021)
- Night / I Wrote a Good Omelet, three voices (STB) (2021)
- String quartet (2021)
- Sarabandes, 2 voices, 2 organs and ensemble (2022)
- εὖ γὰρ ἐγὼ, choir (SATB) (2023)
- Chants / Genocide Joe, choir (2024)
- Six people on a sailboat, flute, alto saxophone, viola and orgalitho (2024)
- Residents of Gaza, 2 or more performers (2025)

== Selected discography ==
- Marlene, Mercury Records (1998) (with The Scene)
- 1998, Pressure (1999) (with Thé Lau)
- Tom Johnson: Symmetries, Karnatic Lab Records (2006) (with Samuel Vriezen)
- cage.frey.vriezen.feldman.ayres.johnson manion, Edition Wandelweiser Records (2010)
- Tom Johnson: Questions, Maria de Alvear World Edition (2012) (with Carol Robinson & Tom Johnson)
- Jürg Frey: 24 Wörter, Edition Wandelweiser Records (2014) (with Regula Konrad & Andrew McIntosh)
- Dante Boon: clarinet (& piano), Another Timbre (2016) (with Jürg Frey)
- Jürg Frey: Collection Gustave Roud, Another Timbre (2017) (with Jürg Frey, Stefan Thut & Andrew McIntosh)
- Düsseldorf recital, Rhizome.s (2017)
- beuger.boon.susam, Edition Wandelweiser Records (2018)
- Antoine Beuger: traces of eternity: of what is yet to be, a new wave of jazz (2019)
- Gil Sansón / Lance Austin Olsen: Works on Paper, Elsewhere (2019) (guest appearance)
- hannesson.boon.philippakopoulos, Edition Wandelweiser Records (2019)
- Rishin Singh: out from the blinding white, Edition Wandelweiser Records (2019)
- One Night in Forest Hills, Bánh Mì Verlag (2020)
- Jürg Frey: l'air, l'instant - deux pianos, Elsewhere (2020)
- amsterdam.berlin.moscow losoncy, Edition Wandelweiser Records (2021)
- Various Artists: This Is Release MFR100, Moving Furniture Records (2022) (guest appearance, with Martijn Pieck & Martijn Comes)
- Paul Baran: Pan Global Riot, Fang Bomb (2023) (guest appearance)
- Seamus Cater: A History of Musical Pitch, Another Timbre (2023) (guest appearance)
- Dante Boon: Duos, Edition Wandelweiser Records (2023)
- Nicolas Horvath: Dante Boon - Dreamings, Collection 1001 Notes (2024)
- Paul Beaudoin: 3x distance(s), kvieto (2025) (works for solo clarinet by Jukka-Pekka Kervinen and Dante Boon)
- The Scene – Live On 2 Meter Sessions (Coast to Coast) (2025)
- Boon Plays Callahan, FLEA (2025)
- Erik Satie: Vexations (self-released) (2026)
- Palestinian Songs (self-released) (with Antoine Beuger, Amir Boon, Dirar Kalash, Han Lee, Esther Lindenbergh, Uijin Oh, Rasha Ragab, Gil Sansón, Denis Sorokin, Sjoert Schwitters and Sytske van der Ster) (2026)
- Jürg Frey: Three Piano Pieces (tba)
