= Send (album) =

Studio album by Wire
- Released: May 2003
- Recorded: 2002, 2003
- Studios: Swim Studio, London
- Genres: Alternative rock, industrial rock
- Length: 40:30
- Label: Pinkflag

Wire studio album chronology
The First Letter (1991)	Send (2003)	Object 47 (2008)

Send is the tenth studio album by the English rock group Wire, released in May 2003 through their own Pinkflag label. It was their first recording as a four-piece since Manscape (1990) and the first full-length release by any incarnation of the group since 1991. The album contains seven songs previously released in 2002 on the EPs Read & Burn 01 and Read & Burn 02, and four songs exclusive to this release.

== Background ==
The predecessor to the Read & Burn EPs and Send was the "Twelve Times You" single in 2001, described by Wire's Colin Newman as two "machine-like" remixes he did of a live performance of their classic track "12 X U". "I actually did them for the band's amusement, but everyone really liked them." This led to the first new piece of music with the industrial-influenced sound that would define Send: the track "1st Fast" from Read & Burn 01. Newman said in 2020: "I'd spent the 90’s mainly working on electronic productions, but at the millennial cusp there was a point when the tonality of certain electronic styles was becoming more "rock" like. I'm talking about "dark" drum and bass. ... A clash between rock and electronica was very much in the air."

Wire did some basic recording in a rehearsal room, where they mainly recorded drums, which were later processed and edited at Newman's Swim Studio in London. Bassist Graham Lewis, who was based in Sweden, mailed ideas and parts for incorporation or took them with him on his visits to London. Newman and guitarist Bruce Gilbert then created the material for the EPs and Send over a two-year period in the studio. Send features more guitar riffs by Gilbert than any other Wire album, and the majority of the lyrics are his.

The Guardian's Adam Sweeting described Send as an "exhilarating purity of noise, often combining a Krautrockish electro-minimalism with harsh slabs of guitar distortion."

== Reception ==
Professional ratings
Aggregate scores
Source	Rating
Metacritic	84/100
Review scores
Source	Rating
AllMusic	4/5 stars
The Austin Chronicle	3.5/5 stars
Entertainment Weekly	B+
The Guardian	4/5 stars
Mojo	4/5 stars
Pitchfork	7.5/10
Rolling Stone	3/5 stars
The Rolling Stone Album Guide	4/5 stars
Uncut	4/5 stars
The Village Voice	A−

Mojo ranked Send at 10 on their best albums of 2003 list. The album also scores 84/100 on Metacritic, signifying "universal acclaim". Stereogum ranked it 4th (out of 15) in their 2015 "Wire Albums from Worst to Best" list, writing, "It's not simply the fact that Send sounds more punk than its '80s and '90s predecessors that makes it superior; it's the fact that, for the first time in years, Wire really sounds like they're having fun."

== Track listing ==
All tracks are written by Wire.

No.	Title	Length
1.	"In the Art of Stopping"	3:34
2.	"Mr Marx's Table"	3:02
3.	"Being Watched"	2:57
4.	"Comet"	3:17
5.	"The Agfers of Kodack"	3:11
6.	"Nice Streets Above"	3:45
7.	"Spent"	4:43
8.	"Read & Burn"	2:34
9.	"You Can't Leave Now"	3:41
10.	"Half Eaten"	1:58
11.	"99.9"	7:42

=== Limited edition ===
Initial mail-order copies of the album came with a bonus live album WIRE - Metro, Chicago, 14th September 2002. It was reported that this inclusion came about due to concern being raised at the fact that the majority of Send had already been available on the group's two Read & Burn EPs. The live album later became part of the Wire Legal Bootleg series in 2010 as Legal Bootleg Series: 14 Sept 2002 Metro, Chicago.

Bonus CD: WIRE - Metro, Chicago, 14th September 2002
No.	Title	Length
1.	"99.9"	7:45
2.	"Germ Ship"	1:57
3.	"Mr Marx's Table"	5:57
4.	"First Fast"	1:27
5.	"Read & Burn"	2:15
6.	"The Agfers of Kodack"	3:43
7.	"Comet"	2:41
8.	"In the Art of Stopping"	3:29
9.	"Spent"	4:09
10.	"I Don't Understand"	4:18

Recorded by Chris Shepard, assisted by Stuart Holverson. Mixed by Colin Newman at Swim Studio, 2003.

=== Send Ultimate ===
The album was reissued with a bonus CD and expanded liner notes by Wilson Neate in 2010 as Send Ultimate. It contains material recorded by Wire in the studio between 2000 and 2003. This includes both sides of the "12 Times U" vinyl-only collector's item; two unreleased tracks; alternate versions of two tracks from this period that subsequently appeared on 2007s Read & Burn 03; and the five tracks from the first two Read & Burn EPs that were omitted from the original Send.

Send Ultimate bonus CD
No.	Title	Original release	Length
1.	"I Don't Understand"	Read & Burn 01, 2002	3:18
2.	"Trash/Treasure"	Read & Burn 02, 2002	5:08
3.	"Raft Ants"	Read & Burn 02	2:05
4.	"Germ Ship"	Read & Burn 01	1:51
5.	"1st Fast"	Read & Burn 01	1:41
6.	"Artificial Gravity"	previously unreleased	6:14
7.	"DJ Fuckoff"	previously unreleased	5:30
8.	"12 Times U"	from "Twelve Times You" single, 2001	1:40
9.	"Our Time (Minimal Mix)"	previously unreleased; original version from Read & Burn 03, 2007	4:24
10.	"Desert Diving (Alt Mix)"	previously unreleased; original version from Read & Burn 03	5:22
11.	"12 Times X"	from "Twelve Times You" single	1:30

== Personnel ==
Wire

- Colin Newman
- Graham Lewis
- Bruce Gilbert
- Robert Grey

Production

- Colin Newman – recording, mixing
- Denis Blackham – mastering
- David Coppenhall – design
