= The First Letter =

Studio album by Wir
- Released: October 1991
- Recorded: 1991
- Studios: Worldwide International, London; Swanyard Recording Studios, London
- Genres: Electronic; art punk; alternative dance
- Length: 54:50
- Language: English
- Label: Mute
- Producers: Wir; Paul Kendall; Pascal Gabriel

Wir chronology
The Drill (1991)	The First Letter (1991)	1985–1990: The A List (1993)

Singles from The First Letter
- 1. "So and Slow It Grows" Released: April 1991

Professional ratings
Review scores
Source	Rating
AllMusic	2/5 stars
Robert Christgau	A−

The First Letter is the ninth studio album and the last album released by Wire before their second extended hiatus. It was released in October 1991 by Mute Records. It was one of only three releases credited to "Wir", the others being the "So and Slow It Grows" single, and a limited edition two-song EP entitled Vien. The band changed their name to "Wir" after drummer Robert Gotobed's departure; he quit the band because the musical direction increasingly relied on drum machines and loops. Other than an Erasure remix in 1995, the band would not reform until 1999, and not release any new material until 2002's Read & Burn 01 and Read & Burn 02 EPs and 2003's subsequent Send album. The First Letter produced the single "So and Slow It Grows."

== Content ==
The track "Take It (For Greedy)" is constructed out of samples from Wire's own music. It contains elements of "Strange" and "Straight Line" from Pink Flag (1977), and "Another the Letter" from Chairs Missing (1978), among others. "Making a track out of Wire samples," singer and guitarist Colin Newman explained, "seemed to me to be an extremely funny thing to do." The departed Robert Gotobed appears on the track in sampled form, as the snare drum used was taken from one of the band's 1970s albums. "Ticking Mouth" features a rare lead vocal by guitarist Bruce Gilbert.

== Critical reception ==
Stereogum ranked The First Letter 11th (out of 15) in their "Wire Albums from Worst to Best" list. They felt that the album included some "genuine standouts" such as the "beat-heavy industrial dance track "Take It (For Greedy)" ... two dreamy and beat-driven versions of "So and Slow It Grows," the ominous dark wave tones of "A Big Glue Canal," and the surreal factory throb of "Naked, Whooping and Such-Like," which opens with a spoken-word reading."

Trouser Press felt that the album is "more spirited" than anything since 1988's A Bell Is a Cup, and AllMusic wrote, "the vocals mean considerably less than the musical textures – it's all about the sound, not the song. Some of the soundscapes are quite interesting, but much of the music fails to be compelling."

== Track listing ==
All tracks written by Bruce Gilbert, Colin Newman and Graham Lewis, except as indicated.

1. "Take It (For Greedy)" – 3:13
2. "So and Slow It Grows" – 5:13
3. "A Bargain at 3 and 20 Yeah!" – 2:55
4. "Footsi — Footsi" – 4:55
5. "Ticking Mouth" – 6:31
6. "It Continues" – 4:33
7. "Looking at Me (Stop!) Stop!" – 4:12
8. "Naked, Whooping and Such-Like (Extended On and On)" (Lewis) – 7:05
9. "Tailor Made" – 3:48
10. "No Cows on the Ice" – 4:16
11. "A Big Glue Canal" – 4:09
12. "So and Slow It Grows" (single mix) – 4:00 (CD and cassette bonus track)

== Personnel ==
Adapted from the album liner notes, except where noted.

Wir

- Bruce Gilbert
- Colin Newman
- Graham Lewis

Additional personnel

- Claude Bessey – reading on "Naked, Whooping and Such-Like (Extended On and On)"
- Wir – production
- Paul Kendall – production, engineering, mixing
- Pascal Gabriel – additional production, mixing on "So and Slow It Grows" (single mix) (at Swanyard Recording Studios)
- George Holt – engineering on "So and Slow It Grows" (single mix) (at Swanyard Recording Studios)
- Russell Haswell – design, images
- Graham Lewis – "3w" and "stoneman" images (credited as "Sven")
- Red Cloud – layout
