= Taylan Susam =

Turkish-Dutch composer (born 1986)

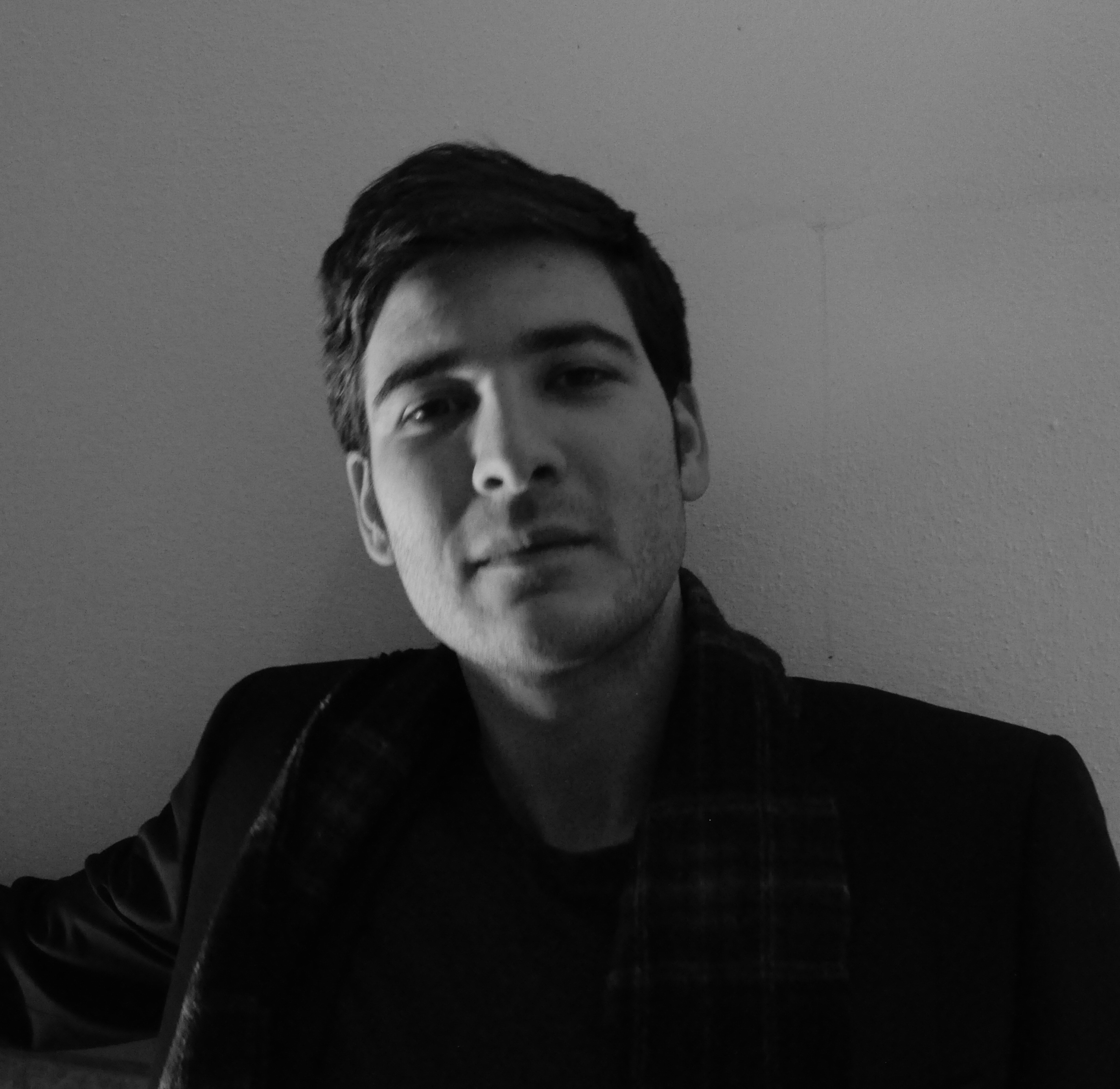

Background information
- Born: November 18, 1986 (age 38) Amsterdam, Netherlands
- Genres: Experimental music
- Occupation(s): Composer, musician
- Instrument: Clarinet
- Years active: 2003 – present
- Labels: Another Timbre
- Website: taylansusam.net

Taylan Susam (born November 18, 1986) is a Turkish-Dutch composer of experimental music. He is a member of the Wandelweiser group, which has been described by The New Yorker as "an informal network of twenty or so experimental-minded composers who share an interest in slow music, quiet music, spare music, fragile music."

== Biography ==
Susam grew up in Amsterdam, where he attended the Barlaeus Gymnasium. He studied composition with Martijn Padding and Yannis Kyriakides at the Royal Conservatory of The Hague, and privately with Antoine Beuger and Samuel Vriezen, among others.

His compositions have been performed in more than a dozen countries, at such venues as the Experimental Sound Gallery Saint Petersburg, Galerie Mark Müller, Glenn Gould Studio, Goethe-Institut Amsterdam, Grote or Sint-Jacobskerk, Hafnarborg, ISSUE Project Room, Kid Ailack Art Hall, Kunstmuseum Villa Zanders, Kunstraum, Magna Plaza, Maison des Jeunesses Musicales, SMART Project Space, St Anne and St Agnes, The Stone, REDCAT, and at festivals such as Ostrava Days, November Music, Dark Music Days, Transit, the ISCM Pan Music Festival, and the Amsterdam Wandelweiser Festival.

Performers of Susam's music have included Quatuor Bozzini, Asko Ensemble, Ensemble Chronophonie, Ensemble Sisyphe, Incidental Music, Nordic Affect, S.E.M. Ensemble, Wandelweiser Composers Ensemble, Dante Boon, Erik Carlson, Eve Egoyan, Eva-Maria Houben, Radu Malfatti, Michael Pisaro, Taku Unami, and Daan Vandewalle. Along with colleagues Daniel Brandes, Johnny Chang and Sam Sfirri, Susam belongs to a younger generation of Wandelweiser composers.

Taylan Susam is also known as a performer of experimental music. He appears as a conductor on an overview CD of Philip Corner's music on New World Records and as a clarinetist in Radu Malfatti's düsseldorf vielfaches released through Malfatti's label b-boim. Susam organized the concert series leaf sound / wave sound (named after a Robert Lax poem) in 2007, presenting six concerts of experimental music. In the same year, he performed Tom Johnson's Kirkman's Ladies on a positive organ in the foyer of the Royal Conservatory of The Hague. In 2014, Susam delivered a version of John Cage's Lecture on Nothing in Amsterdam's Perdu theater.

In 2007, he collaborated with dancer-choreographer Katharina Maschenka Horn to create the performance triptych august 1973, based on painter Francis Bacon's work of the same title. In the same year, he was invited, along with John Lely, to work with Fluxus artist Ben Patterson to curate a night of performances in Ostrava's Philharmonic Hall. He has also collaborated with poets Oswald Egger and Samuel Vriezen.

A retrospective of Susam's work was presented in 2013 at the Los Angeles performance space the wulf. Recordings of his compositions appear on three CDs released by the British label Another Timbre and a new recording of his solo piano music has been announced by pianist Dante Boon. His music was also included in mixtapes released by FACT Magazine and WQXR (both compiled by Julia Holter).

== Music ==
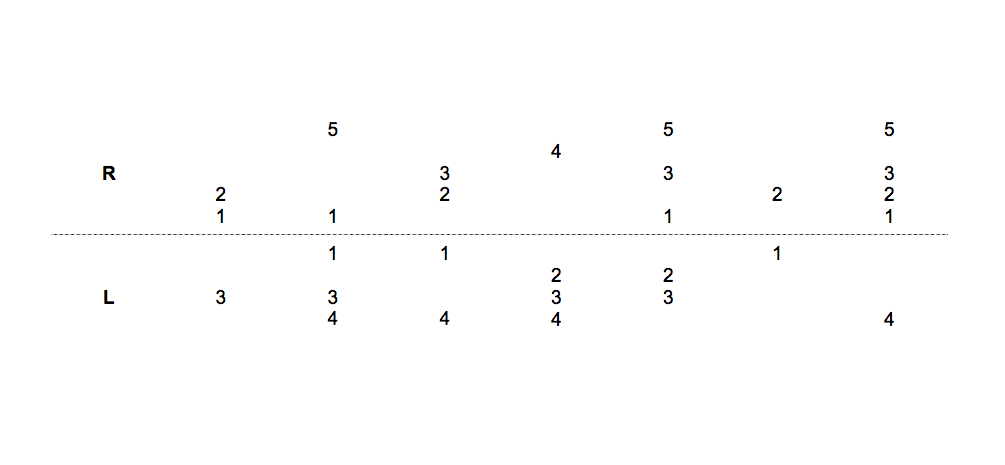
Excerpt from for louis couperin (2009)

In her 2016 study Experimental music since 1970, musicologist Jennie Gottschalk interprets Susam's use of silence as "a potentiality that includes all sounds." Critic Richard Pinnell, in a review of Susam's 2009 ensemble piece for maaike schoorel, adds:

This music, typical of the Wandelweiser collective of composition that Susam is a member of, has a wonderful stillness to it, and yet the little islands of soft sounds that do appear, as simple as they are, seem to harbour whole worlds of sound and timbre.

Daniel Barbiero, writing for Avant Music News, describes a recording of the same piece as an "[embodiment] of an almost metaphysical dialogue between activity and non-activity."

Susam's earlier work is marked by the use of random numerals as a means of notation. In these scores, such numerals have served to indicate anything from the number of sounds to be played within a span of time (for maaike schoorel, for anthony fiumara) or the duration of a rest or an unspecified pitch (for sesshū tōyō), to which player should play ever so slightly louder than the others (for blinky palermo). The score of his for louis couperin, inspired by the tradition of the unmeasured prelude, consists of nothing but two rows of numbers indicating the fingerings to be used by a keyboard player. According to composer and musicologist Daniel James Wolf,

[t]he notation in [Taylan Susam's] pieces is radically concentrated, often to just a bit of prose and a field of random numbers or single pitches on staves. He's interested in some very basic elements of music—intonation, continuity, contrasts between sounds and silences—and this radical concentration is anything but a naive response to those elements.

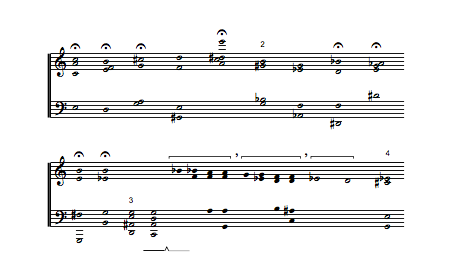
Excerpt from tombeau (2014)

In 2009, Susam began working on his nocturnes, composing a one-page nocturne every day. Musical Toronto describes Susam's nocturnes as follows: "The modal arc of this piece traverses the entire keyboard, note by isolated note. The meditative questioning of this night music invites an almost existential concentration." In another review, the piece is said to "[defy] the daily movement we experience toward and away from nighttime, as if night simply were, unchanging and unrelenting in its night-ness." Susam himself has described this piece as a musical exploration of "how our souls are affected by our sometimes faint and doubtful perception of the world."

In contrast with the nocturnes's descending melodic lines suggestive of harmonic modulation, the 2014 piece tombeau, dedicated to the memory of his friend Martijn Teerlinck and commissioned by November Music, consists of slow, downward arpeggiated harmonies, out of which fragments of melody seem to emerge.

Many of Susam's titles are dedications to specific individuals (among them, Blinky Palermo, Sesshū Tōyō and Louis Couperin). This is meant, in part, to reflect his commitment to composing for a certain "someone" rather than for an anonymous "everyone." Susam's approach here has been likened to poet Frank O'Hara's personism.

== Selected works ==
Solo

Piano

- for james tenney, 2006
- for louis couperin, 2009
- nocturnes, 2009–
- preludes, 2010–
- for john mcalpine, 2013
- tombeau, 2014

Other

- for jürg frey, clarinet, 2006
- for john eckhardt, double bass, 2007
- for andré o. möller, any instrument (with electronics), 2008
- for sesshū tōyō, any instrument, 2009
Ensemble
- for joseph kudirka, 2006
- for anthony fiumara, 2006
- for blinky palermo, 2006
- for anthony fiumara, 2007
- for chiyoko szlavnics, 2007
- for sesshū tōyō, 2008
- for antoine beuger, 2009
- for maaike schoorel, 2009
- for sam sfirri, 2010
- string quartet (for victor kal), 2010
- for john lely, 2011
