= Mark So =

American experimental composer (born 1978)

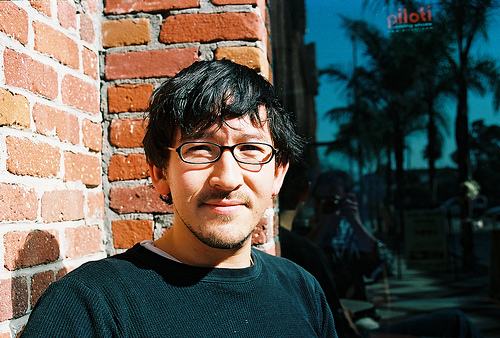
- Mark So in 2008

Background information
- Born: June 14, 1978 (age 48)
- Origin: Syracuse, New York
- Genres: Experimental music
- Occupations: Composer, musician
- Instruments: reading, piano, tape recorder, typewriter
- Years active: 1994 – present
- Website: mark-so.com

Mark So (born June 14, 1978, in Syracuse, NY) is an American experimental composer and performer living in Los Angeles. His works, numbering over 800 (including a group of about 300 concerning poems of John Ashbery), are mostly text-based and influenced by New York School aesthetics, Fluxus, and the Wandelweiser composers collective.

== Work ==
So's work has been described as using disparate media to explore ordinary situations in various open frames of perception and action, typically proceeding through simple methods of recording/transcription/reading, as well as changing experiences of silence. As critic Petra Hedler notes, "Mark So strongly embraces the phenomenon of the just barely audible, taking up a broad palette of sound-producing devices (including glasses, stones)." Artist/writer Madison Brookshire elaborates:

there are not just sounds and silences, the sounds are stretched over the silence, just barely there. They do not supersede the silence; they are parallel to it, moving along with it. And at times, impossibly, even the silence itself can be stretched too thin. The piece breaks and you are simply, profoundly in the room or in the environment. The tightrope snaps and you can no longer pretend to float above or beyond the world. There are often moments of great beauty in a So piece, but there are never moments of transcendence.

Drawing a contrast with composer John Cage, he continues:

Cage made it his project to reveal that music could be any sounds in any order. This involves an equivalence—one thing is like another—that negates value judgment. So goes further: any sounds in any order, but instead of an equivalence between them, there is a radical disparity. Cage famously made an enemy of harmony, but in a sense, he used silence in all of his pieces after 4′33″ as a kind of harmony—the sounds of the environment always “fit” inside a Cage piece. In So, the silences are dissonant. There are layers of silence and they are in contrast if not outright contest.

On July 10, 2006, So collaborated with composer James Orsher, artist Michael Parker and 16 area musicians to bring about a 3-hour performance of James Tenney's In a large, open space (1994) at the 40,000-square-foot (3,700 m^{2}) Cold Storage temporary art facility in downtown Los Angeles. On September 23, 2007, So participated in a worldwide performance of Hungarian-Swiss composer Istvàn Zelenka's Phontaine (1997- ), organized by fellow composer Jürg Frey.[2] So gave the first performance of Christian Wolff's Small Preludes (2008–9) at CalArts on October 24, 2009.[3] He appears on two CDs of music by composer Michael Pisaro released on Edition Wandelweiser Records: as a pianist on harmony series 11-16, and contributing a sine tone to a realization of an unrhymed chord produced by Joseph Kudirka. More recently, So has pursued unique collaborations with artists working beyond the field of music, including a performance-based study conceived with artists Julie Tolentino and Stosh Fila and done in Los Angeles in 2010; a pair of notebook scores with poet Eileen Myles—his (IDLE.) 51 THINGS TO DO WITH TWO HANDS for Eileen Myles and Myles's Moving whole heart for Mark—which they performed together in 2011 in New York and Los Angeles; and a series of multi-media performance environments with artist Rick Bahto and later, with Bahto and musician Julia Holter, realized in various Los Angeles venues, including the wulf., Jancar Jones Gallery, and MOCA (2011–2013). Describing the first of these ventures, a performance entitled "Slides & Sides—Still Lifes, Donuts, Twice Around, Palms" presented by So and Bahto at the wulf. in October 2011, critic Liz Kotz writes:

For more than four hours, Bahto used two 35mm slide projectors to cast two series of images—of Los Angeles area doughnut shops and cacti—onto walls, floors, and ceiling, in constantly varying rhythms and configurations, while So played a tape (Twice Around, comprising different field recordings) and performed his notebook, A Book of Palms, at the piano. With four tracks of (apparently unrelated) material being activated in different ways, the evening nonetheless created a compelling whole.

James Orsher performs Mark So's Sur la plage at Goleta Beach, CA, November 11, 2007, during mark so: late early works.

So's music was featured in the week-long retrospective mark so: late early works, which took place at UC Santa Barbara and environs in fall 2007, and explored a variety of work across diverse locations (many of them outdoors) and sometimes extreme durations (up to 6 hours).[4] In 2009, So published BANGS, a book detailing Swiss composer Manfred Werder's ongoing performance (begun in August, 2006) of So's 2005 composition BANGS [to Manfred Werder], including the score, correspondence between the two composers over the course of the realization, reflection upon the process, and photographs of salient incidents. His three-opera Heliogabalus cycle (2009–10), combining Antonin Artaud's Heliogabalus with a text of his own and scored for 1, 2 and 3 amplified readers, premiered at the wulf. in Los Angeles in February 2010; the performers were So, Julia Holter and Tashi Wada. So composed the original music for Gabor Kalman's documentary film There Was Once..., which went into limited release in 2011.

Since 2011, So has created numerous works for audio cassette. These tapes, typically comprising multiple layers of time that alternate between segments of taped sound and segments advanced without recording sound, have taken on diverse functions, from stand-alone pieces to multi-channel backgrounds in more complex performance settings. Reading 'Illuminations' [readings 41] (2011), So's scenario for 4 audio cassettes and two readers using John Ashbery's new English translation of Arthur Rimbaud's Illuminations, was commissioned for the 2011 AxS Festival and premiered by So and Julia Holter in October 2011 at Pasadena's Art Center College of Design. The tape components of this piece were later released on a cassette from Recondite Industries in 2012, paired with So's keyboard notebook A Book of Palms. In October 2012, So performed his piece Into Silence - readings 23 [for John Cage] (2007), a 6-hour, 15 minute solo reading, during the John Cage Festival at the Florida State University, situated among three tape sources playing through a total of nine cassettes. This scenario expanded to four tape sources and 15 tapes when So next performed Into Silence at Michael Strogoff Gallery in Marfa, TX, in June 2013.[5] Between these events, he collaborated with composer Michael Winter on a performance at the wulf. during morning twilight of March 31, 2013, in which Winter's minor third abstract (2011) for solo piano slowly gave way to a two-channel realization of So's tape though we haven't read it, we know there is a script [“The End of New England” by Eileen Myles] readings 44 (2012). Reviewing this performance, writer Stuart Krimko observes:

Several iterations of spring were cropping up: there was the spring that appeared in the essay, and another that So read out loud on the tape as he uttered the phrase ["And look at this, it’s Spring."], and the most tangible one that was taking place in real time, on an early Sunday morning at the end of March. Together, they emphasized that coincidence and heightened attention are dependent upon one another, and that in concert they can take hold of the senses and direct them to their own ends, revealing unexpected beauty, symmetry, and congruencies of form. This is the kind of awareness that arises when art is treated as an active agent of simile, a force intent on bringing disparate things into proximity.

So attended Pomona College and CalArts. His main composition teachers were Michael Pisaro, Thomas Flaherty and Annetta Kaplan.

== Recordings ==
Title	Album details
Into the similarity of firmaments	Mark So: Into the similarity of firmaments Ashbery series; Cassia Streb, viola; Released: October 22, 2015; Label: DEATH-SPIRAL (D-S 1,0); Format: audio cassette edition of 100
DARK INTERIORS / PLACES OF THE HEART	Mark So: though we haven't read it, we know there is a script (text The End of New England by Eileen Myles) / Shenandoah Suite; Released: June 2, 2014; Label: DEATH-SPIRAL (D-S 0,0); Format: audio cassette edition of 200
Pale plumes of dullness	Mark So: Pale plumes of dullness (reading The Vermont Notebook by John Ashbery & Joe Brainard); Released: December 21, 2013; Label: Motor Image Recordings (MI01); Format: audio cassette handmade edition of 20; original cover art by Madison Brookshire
READING ILLUMINATIONS / A BOOK OF PALMS	Mark So: Reading 'Illuminations' (text by A. Rimbaud, trans. J. Ashbery) / A Book of Palms; Released: December 12, 2012; Label: Recondite Industries (RI-5); Format: audio cassette edition of 100
sitting and listening / let's grasp it, naked as it is...under a storm of stones	Mark So and Patrick Farmer: sitting and listening / let's grasp it, naked as it is...under a storm of stones; Released: September 6, 2012; Label: winds measure recordings (wm29); Format: audio cassette edition of 100; letterpress sleeve, insert, score card

== Publications ==
- So, Mark. a box of wind: Ashbery Series 2006-2011, Impossible Objects/Marfa Book Co, 2017.
- So, Mark. "text | composition - scores and structure after 4'33"" in The Open Space Magazine, Fall 2013/Winter 2014 (46-51).
- So, Mark. from "text | composition - scores and structure after 4'33"" and 2 scores, performance documentation, commentary in Lely, John and Saunders, James. Word Events: Perspectives on Verbal Notation, Continuum, 2012 (58, 60, 353-9). ISBN 978-1-4411-7310-2
- So, Mark and Werder, Manfred. BANGS, lulu.com, 2009. ISBN 978-0-557-06068-9
- So, Mark. "nearing/hearing" in Everybody Loves Difficult Music (Orsher, So and Roberts, eds.), Machine Project, 2007. ISBN 0-9753140-2-5 (companion volume to the series Everybody Loves Difficult Music and You Too Can Play Difficult Music at Machine Project) and The Open Space Magazine, Fall 2008 (119–123).
