= Olivia Louvel =

French-born British composer and artist

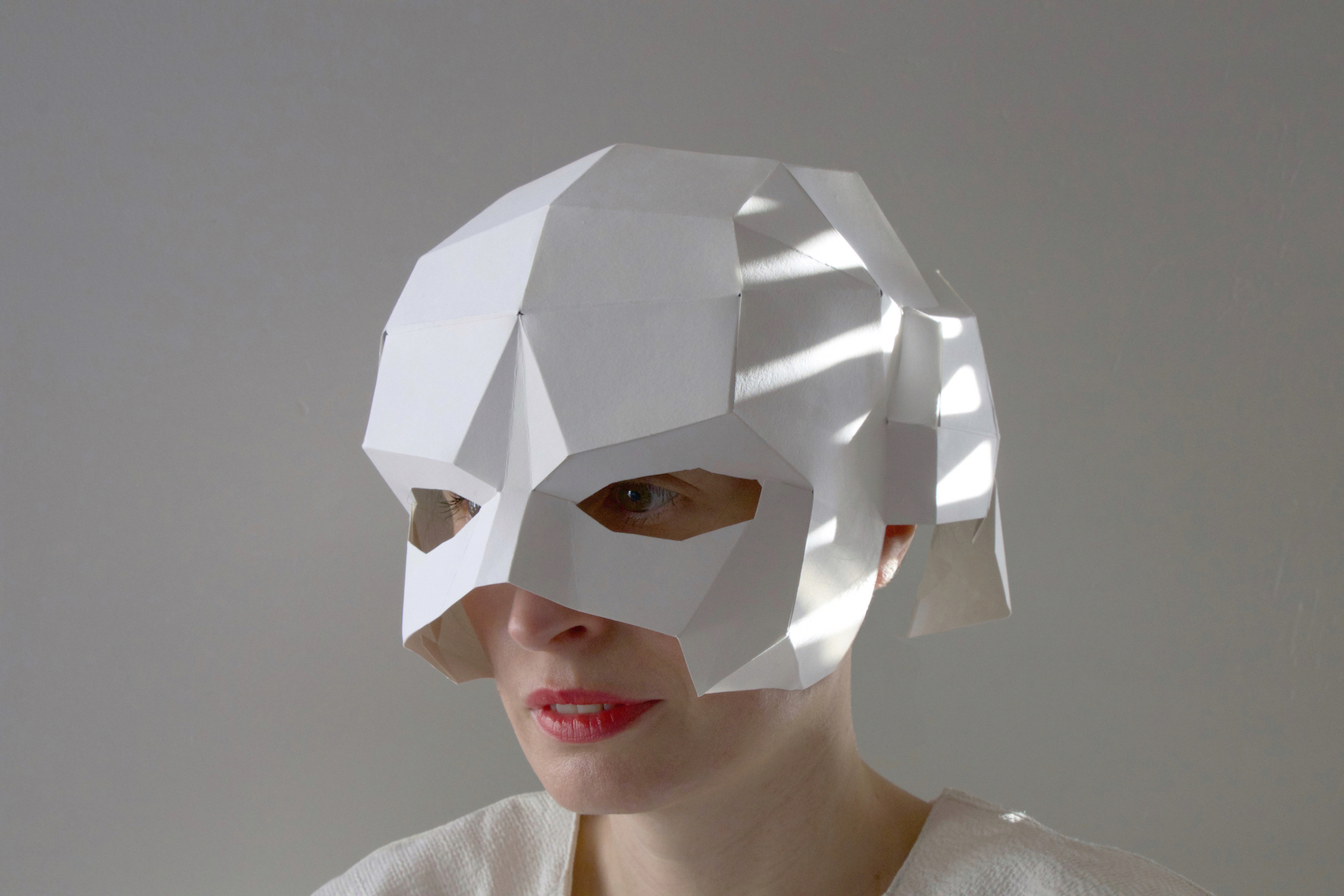
- Artwork for SculptOr
- Citizenship: French, British
- Education: University of Brighton
- Notable work: The Sculptor Speaks (2020), LOL (2022)
- Awards: Ivor Novello Award Best Sound Art (2023), Qwartz Electronic Music Awards Best Album (2011)
- Website: www.olivialouvel.com

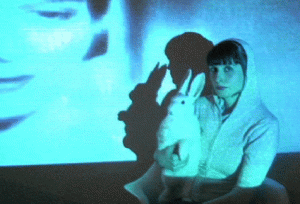
Olivia Louvel in Lulu in Suspension

Olivia Louvel is an artist, composer and researcher whose practice encompasses sound recordings, sound art installations and video art. She won an Ivor Novello Award in Sound Art (2023) for LOL, a sonic intervention delivered via the public address system of Middlesbrough's CCTV surveillance network, which reflected the state of political affairs in Britain.

The Sculptor Speaks, a resounding of a 1961 tape of Barbara Hepworth's voice, was nominated for an Ivor Novello Award in the Sound Art category at the Ivors Composer Awards 2020. She was interviewed by Stuart Maconie on his BBC Radio 6 programme Freak Zone about her "compelling sculpture-inspired work" on Barbara Hepworth.

She has presented her work at Towner Eastbourne, The Hepworth Wakefield, the Hepworth Research Network, Yorkshire Sound Women, Chapter Arts Centre, Middlesbrough Art Week, Resonance FM /Extra, De La Warr Pavilion, Ikon Gallery, IKLECTIK, Brighton Dome and Brighton Digital Festival.

She has published in journals, including Leonardo (The MIT Press) and Organised Sound (Cambridge University Press).

== Education ==
Louvel studied at the National Superior Conservatory of Dramatic Arts of Paris and had the opportunity to work with Klaus Michael Grüber and Michel Piccoli on a reworking of a Luigi Pirandello play.

She holds a master's degree in Digital Music & Sound Arts, University of Brighton.

In 2025, she earned a PhD from the University of Brighton for her thesis, ‘A hybrid encounter, a concrete voice: on the interplay of voice and sculpture,’ which drew on cross-disciplinary research across the Fine Art and Sound departments. Her thesis was supervised by Amy Cunningham, Dr Kersten Glandien and Dr Stephen Mallinder. She coined the term ‘voice sculpture’.

== Releases, Video Art ==
2006: Luna Parc Hotel, an album released by the Vienna-based label Angelika Koehlermann. With guest appearances by Michael J.Sheehy and Sébastien Libolt.

2008: Lulu in Suspension, an album and video art, inspired by silent-movie star Louise Brooks and her book Lulu in Hollywood. Released on Optical Sound Records and Fine Arts, which is run by French artist Pierre Beloüin.

2011: Doll Divider, album and video art. Initially released digitally on Ototoi Music/Optical Sound in 2010. Following her Qwartz Album Award, she founded her label, Cat Werk Imprint, and reissued the album as an enhanced and remastered 12" vinyl. Doll Divider was inspired by her Processed Dolls series, A4 paintings made using pages from fashion magazines, repainting over the models' photos.

2012: ō, music for haiku, album, video art and clay artwork based on haikus by the poet Bashō. The limited-edition CD features a hand-drawn Magic Fish Dog, a character invented by Louvel.

2014: Beauty Sleep, an album and video art. A suite of songs, complemented by a series of experimental short films shot in West Sussex, sees her reinvent herself as a bird-woman. In My Shed is a Recoil remake created from a loop of Stone taken from Alan Wilder’s second Recoil release on Mute, Hydrology (1988). Bats was remixed by Simon Fisher Turner for the EP Bats by Night (2015).

2016: Afraid of Women, a "compelling audio-visual" produced from sampled sounds and re-fragmented images sourced from the internet for the female:pressure campaign, curated by Antye Greie-Ripatti to raise awareness of the autonomous zone in northern Syria, Rojava.

2017: Data Regina, album, 3D animated videos and an online platform. Louvel "packaged experimental electronic music, new media art, and 16th century conflict into multimedia art", exploring the reign of Mary Queen of Scots. "The refined melodies of Louvel's intimate vocals and Fiona Brice's lyrical violin stand in fragile opposition to a backdrop, based largely around processed tambour samples, of harsh percussive rolls and looming reverberations. It evokes not only the brutality of the battles that peppered the UK in the 16th century but the sense of surveillance and paranoia that both women must have experienced." Abi Bliss, The Wire.

2019: Not A Creature of Paper, a Louise Labé-inspired composition commissioned by the avant-garde ensemble Juice Vocal, premiered at Kings Place, London.

2020: The Sculptor Speaks, a stereo radio broadcast and video art piece based on a 1961 tape by Barbara Hepworth, premiered on Resonance Extra Resonance FM, "a dreamy meditation on the nature of creativity", Deborah Nash, The Wire.

2020: I am The Figure in the Landscape, video art documenting the process of working on a visual maquette at home during lockdown in preparation for The Sculptor Speaks.

2020: SculptOr, album. A suite of nine pieces inspired by Barbara Hepworth's extensive writings. "Armed with an algorithmic chisel and mallet, Louvel repurposes writings by the late English sculptor Barbara Hepworth (...) SculptOr is a highly conceptual and meta-referential piece, a sort of meditation on artistic practices." Antonio Poscic, The Quietus.

2023: doggerLANDscape, an album based on Doggerland, the land that once stretched between today’s British coast and Europe. "a taut, charged and insightful collection that poses significant questions, at least in my mind, about political identity, ideological and material borders, and the ways in which our geological environments shape our lives and thinking." Johny Lamb, The Quietus.

2024: doggerLANDscape, video art screened at Towner Eastbourne for 'Artist films: Human Outlooks on Precarious Coastal Lands'

== Installations ==
2019: The Whole Inside, a generative sound mural of nine speaker drivers and data projection, exploring the violent misogyny of incel communities, Sound Diffusion Laboratory, DMSA, University of Brighton. Selected for the Longlist at the Aesthetica Art Prize 2021, and featured in the Aesthetica Art Prize Anthology: Future Now.

2021: The Sculptor Speaks, audio-visual installation for 'Barbara Hepworth: Art & Life' at The Hepworth Wakefield.

2022: Doggerland Channels, a sound art installation on Doggerland and the rivers that once linked Britain to the continent, Phoenix Art Space, Brighton, Sound Art Brighton Festival.

2022: Wave Dome, a white-noise and radio-waves installation for a Willow Dome experience, Ecomusicology Plot, Stanmer Organics, Brighton, Sound Plotting Festival.

2022: LOL, a sonic intervention delivered via the public address system of Middlesbrough's CCTV surveillance network for Middlesbrough Art Week, produced with Kersten Glandien, artistic director of Sound Art Brighton. The Ivors Academy jury remarked: “LOL is a provocative, disruptive and impactful work, deftly constructed with humour”. "Shoppers left spooked after 'Boris Johnson sounding' voice is randomly played in town centre."

2023: The Sculptor Speaks, video art,Towner Eastbourne for 'Barbara Hepworth: Art & Life'.

2023: Doggerland Channels, sound art installation, Middlesbrough Art Week.

2025: VoiceScape, a 3D-printed voice sculpture, dimension 38x37x15cm, Sound Diffusion Laboratory, DMSA, University of Brighton.

2025: doggerLANDscape, video art, group show 'Joining Doggerland', APT Gallery, London.

== Live performances ==
Initially trained in classical singing, she began to work as a singer for the flying trapeze circus Les Arts Sauts, performing at 12 metres in the air a Meredith Monk composition. She toured with them for three years, with notable performances at Festival de la Batie in Geneva, and Festival of Perth in 1995.

In April 2007, she performed in the electronic kiosk conceived by Cocktail Designers/architect Olivier Vadrot at Festival en boîte, Bibliothèque de la Part-Dieu, Lyon, France (F).

In November 2018, she toured the UK, presenting the headline audiovisual Data Regina at the event 'Synth Remix', curated by Benjamin Tassie as part of Sound and Music's Composer-Curator scheme, which also featured Jo Thomas.

Louvel has opened for artists including Semiconductors and Eartheater at De La Warr Pavilion (2019), Japanese avant-garde artist Phew at IKLECTIK, Planningtorock at the Earsthetic Festival at Brighton Dome, and Recoil at various concerts on the European Selected tour (2010).

== Collaborations ==
Under the moniker of The Digital Intervention, she worked with Paul Kendall (a long-term Mute Records collaborator) on the album Capture, released in 2003. In 2016, with Paul Kendall as The Digital Intervention, they produced the piece When the sea will rise II for Acoustic Cameras, a project inviting sound artists to annex the real-time flow of webcams from various locations around the world.

In 2016, alongside Daria Baiocchi, Fiona Hallinan, La Cosa Preziosa, Vicky Langan, Úna Lee, Jenn Kirby, Claudia Molitor, Gráinne Mulvey and Rachel Ní Chuinn, Louvel contributed to the collaborative art project Mean Time, inspired by the historical abolition of Dublin Mean Time with her composition 25 minutes and 21 seconds. The event was broadcast live on Nova, RTÉ Lyric FM from Richmond Barracks, Dublin.

Louvel performed 54 bones, a gestural performance art piece for an audience of one, using the Mi.Mu Gloves at Onca Gallery during Brighton Digital Festival 2018, in collaboration with Duncan Cabral, Jaimie Moore and Dominic Rae.

== Awards and grants ==
2011: Qwartz Electronic Music Awards. Qwartz Album Award for Doll Divider.
2011: Prix de la SACD. Société des Auteurs et Compositeurs Dramatiques.
2013: Prix Ars Electronica. Nominated in Digital music & Sound Art for ō, music for haiku.
2014: Arts Council of England. Grant for the Arts for Beauty Sleep.
2016: Arts Council of England. Grant for the Arts for Data Regina.
2020: Ivor Novello Award. Nominated in Sound Art for The Sculptor Speaks. Ivors Composer Awards.
2021: Aesthetica Art Prize. Longlisted for The Whole Inside.
2021: Arts Council of England. Developing Your Creative Practice (DYCP).
2022: Henry Moore Foundation, travel and research grant.
2023: Skaftfell Art Centre, artist-in-residence, Seyðisfjörður, Iceland.
2023: Ivor Novello Award. Best Sound Art for LOL at The Ivors Classical Awards
2025: Arts Council of England. Developing Your Creative Practice (DYCP)

== Discography ==
=== Albums ===
2006: Luna Parc Hotel, digipak CD with booklet. Angelika Koehlermann.
2008: Lulu in Suspension, deluxe digipak CD & digital. Optical Sound.
2010: Doll Divider, digital. Ototoi + Optical Sound.
2011: Doll Divider, 12" vinyl & digital (enhanced & remastered version). Cat Werk Imprint.
2012: ō, music for haiku, CD with hand drawn artwork & digital. Cat Werk Imprint.
2014: Beauty Sleep, digipak CD (DVD size). Cat Werk Imprint.
2017: Data Regina, digipak CD (DVD size). Cat Werk Imprint.
2020: SculptOr, digipak CD (DVD size). Cat Werk Imprint.
2023: doggerLANDscape,10" vinyl, digital, art. Cat Werk Imprint.

=== EPs ===
2015: Bats by Night, digital. Cat Werk Imprint.

=== Collaborations ===
2003: Capture as The Digital Intervention (with Paul Kendall), CD. The Parallel Series + 0101 + Ici D'Ailleurs.

=== Compilations ===
2013: Pussy Riot Freedom. female:pressure.Track featured Doll Divider.
2016: Music, Awareness & Solidarity w/ Rojava Revolution. female:pressure. Track featured Afraid of Women.
2017: Mind The Gap. Gonzo Circus. Track featured Good Queen Bess.
2022: Sound Art Brighton. ReR Megacorp Recommended Records. Track featured Doggerland Channels.

=== Remix & Mixtape ===
2014: Mixtape. An exclusive mix for EB Radio Electronic Beats, featuring her remix of Antye Greie's Poemproducer.
2016: Paris Multiplié for Fiona Brice 'Postcards Reframed'. Bella Union.
2021: Pathetique N.8 for CHAINES 'Beethoven Simulator'. Classical Remix.
