= Eva-Maria Houben =

German composer, organist, pianist, and musicologist

Eva-Maria Houben (born 15 January 1955) is a German composer, organist, pianist, musicologist and university lecturer.

== Life ==
Born in Rheinberg, Houben grew up in Kamp-Lintfort. Her mother worked as a special education teacher, her father was a machine steiger and presbyter in the Protestant village church of Hoerstgen. There, Houben provided the organ service during her secondary school time. After her Abitur she studied school music at the Folkwang University of the Arts (1974–78) and artistic organ playing with Gisbert Schneider (1978–80). Her teachers at the Folkwang Hochschule also included Mauricio Rosenmann Taub (music theory) and Ludger Maxsein (piano).

From 1978 to 1982 Houben was organist at the Evangelische Stadtkirche Dinslaken and applied to German Studies and musicology at the University of Duisburg-Essen. In 1984–86 she taught music and German at the Gymnasium der Stadt Lennestadt and at the Gymnasium an der Gartenstraße in Mönchengladbach-Rheydt.

After obtaining her doctorate (1986, with Norbert Linke) and her habilitation (1990) in musicology, Houben became a lecturer at the University of Duisburg (1987–93) and the Robert Schumann Hochschule (1992/93). In 1993 she was appointed professor at the Institute for Music and Musicology of the Technical University Dortmund. Her research and teaching focuses on music theory and contemporary musik. She organizes concerts with compositions by students, who are also given the opportunity to exchange ideas with experienced colleagues in her series of Composer Portraits (since 1993 among others with Nikolaus Brass, Violeta Dinescu, Vinko Globokar and Adriana Hölszky).

Houben has published regularly in magazines (MusikTexte, Neue Musikzeitung, Neue Zeitschrift für Musik, Das Orchester, Positionen) and has performed as organist and pianist (among others in the piano series at the Kunstraum Düsseldorf).

=== Compositional aesthetics and practice ===
Listening to delicate dynamics up to silence, the sensitization for sound processes and perceptual processes play a central role in Houben's musical thinking. She also plays pieces by John Cage as a pianist.

The compositions of Houben are published by the Edition Wandelweiser; in the Wandelweiser Komponisten Ensemble she works with Antoine Beuger, Burkhard Schlothauer, Jürg Frey, Radu Malfatti among others. Her special interest lies beyond these integrative performance projects, in which musicians and amateur work together, and the creation of Raumklang-installations, which at a certain location (for example in a church) point the way ahead to an upcoming concert or allow it to resonate afterwards.

== Quote ==
From music I can hear different kinds of breaks. Musicologists assign different functions to different types of pauses. Pause can mean something... like Klang. I am beginning to hear less of the break that refers to something, means something, has a certain function... – I am beginning to hear more of the real break, the break that is becoming dangerous: Music is gone, music has disappeared. There is nothing more. I hear nothing – and I hear that I still hear something...

— Eva-Maria Houben, wirklich still…, in Stichnoten, 2001/02.

== Publications ==
- Violeta Dinescu.
- Musikalische Praxis als Lebensform : Sinnfindung und Wirklichkeitserfahrung beim Musizieren.
- Die Aufhebung der Zeit : zur Utopie unbegrenzter Gegenwart in der Musik des 20. Jahrhunderts.
- Gelb : neues Hören; Vinko Globokar, Hans-Joachim Hespos, Adriana Hölszky.
- Jürg Frey : Werkbetrachtungen, Reflexionen, Gespräche.
