= Marianne Schuppe =

Swiss-German vocalist and composer

Marianne Schuppe (born 12 July 1959) is a vocalist, author, and composer of vocal music.

== Biography ==
Originally from Germany, Schuppe moved to Switzerland later in life. Schuppe has developed a unique "voice-body-technique" based on the breathing-work of Erika Kemmann (Institut für Atemlehre Berlin) and Atem-Tonus-Ton developed by Maria Höller. She is currently a guest-lecturer FHNW University of Music in Basel. As President of IGNM Basel she also curates a concert series of contemporary music. As a mentor, she has also participated in the Composers Meet Composers workshops at heim.art with fellow Wandelweiser artists/composers Emmanuelle Waeckerlé, Joachim Eckl, Antoine Beuger, and Jürg Frey.

In her work as a vocalist, she is best known for her recordings of Morton Feldman's Three Voices (col legno 2007) and the vocal works of Giacinto Scelsi (New Albion 2006). She has also recorded two albums of her own works on Edition Wandelweiser, slowsongs (2015) and nosongs (2018).

In 2008, Schuppe began developing a solo-work for voice and sparse accompaniment by lute and uber-bows. Her “slow songs” (2015) and “nosongs” (2018) have been called “a radical re-weighing of all traditional ingredients of song”. Her voice is described as “highly distinctive...without the stylized character of a classical trained singer”. In her review of "nosongs" for The Wire, Tabitha Piseno stated that Schuppe's “combination of accuracy and elusiveness, intimacy and distance may also bring to mind Samuel Beckett’s most radically reductionist prose works, pure constructions infiltrated by the impure world of given things”.

Schuppe’s works include text scores, poems, essays and ensemble pieces for trained voices as well as non-trained voices.

== Compositions ==
- Die Summe (2019) for choirs in public spaces
- Salz, Lücke, Zelt (2018/2019) for 8 voices
- distant shapes / ferne Formen (2019) for voice and tape
- der blumen (2017) for voices performed by Sotto Voce Vocal Collective
- ortlos über die Küste hinaus (2016) for voices
- notes from the hill (2015) for voice and one instrument
- Sapphosongs (2015) for voice and one instrument
- slow songs (2013–15) for voice, lute, e-bows
- Laub (2014) for two voices
- am Fenster (2014) for solo voice
- asunder (2013) for voices
- tidstrand (2009) for voice and instruments
- Avers (2008) for voice, lute, e-bows
- Hitzewelle (2004) music for video work by Andrea Wolfensberger
- temps (1998) for 8 voices
- stilleben (1997) for solo voice
- wandern (1996) for voice and tape
- Fahrzeug (1994) for 14 voices
- das imzu plaudern (1993) for voice and tape
- solo for voice (1988)

== Essays and lectures in German ==
- Musik - Performance - Bewegungen / Ein schleichender Ruck in : Aufzeichnen und Erinnern. Performance Chronik Basel Band II (1987–2006), Hg. v. Sabine Gebhardt Fink, Muda Mathis, Margarit von Büren. Diaphanes Verlag Zürich/Berlin 2016.
- Without. Nachdenken über ein «Singen ohne ...» am Beispiel von fünf Songs des 20. Jahrhunderts in : dissonance #134, 2016
- Man kann ihnen auch einfach zuhören. Zur Arbeit der Weberin und Textildesignerin Isabel Bürgin, 2016
- Die Ahnung als Motor in Potentiale des Vergessens, edited by André Blum, Theresa Georgen, Wolfgang Knapp, Veronika Sellier, Königshausen und Neumann, Würzburg 2012
- Die doppelte Stelle, Singen und Sprechen in der Musik G. Scelsis in: Verkörperungen, Max-Planck-Institut für Wissenschaftsgeschichte, preprint 416, André Blum et al. [ed.], 2011 und im Akademie Verlag, Berlin 2012
- Übersetzen als Arbeitsweise. Programmnotiz zu : Hochland- Übersetzungen, Hans-Jürg Meier, Sarah Giger, Balts Nill, Marianne Schuppe
- Der Wohnwagen, Die Vorbereitung der Musik in : Aspekte der freien Improvisation in der Musik, Hrsg. Dieter Nanz, Wolke Verlag, 2011
- Die Indianer kommen näher, Ein Gespräch in Emails mit Michael Kunkel, in : dissonanz # 106 Juni 2009
- Potentiale des Vergessens - ein Gespräch mit Aleida Assmann, André Blum, Wolfgang Knapp, Theresa Georgen, Marianne Schuppe und Veronika Sellier, in : du magazin, Januar/Februar 2011
