= Emmanuelle Waeckerlé =

Experimental musician

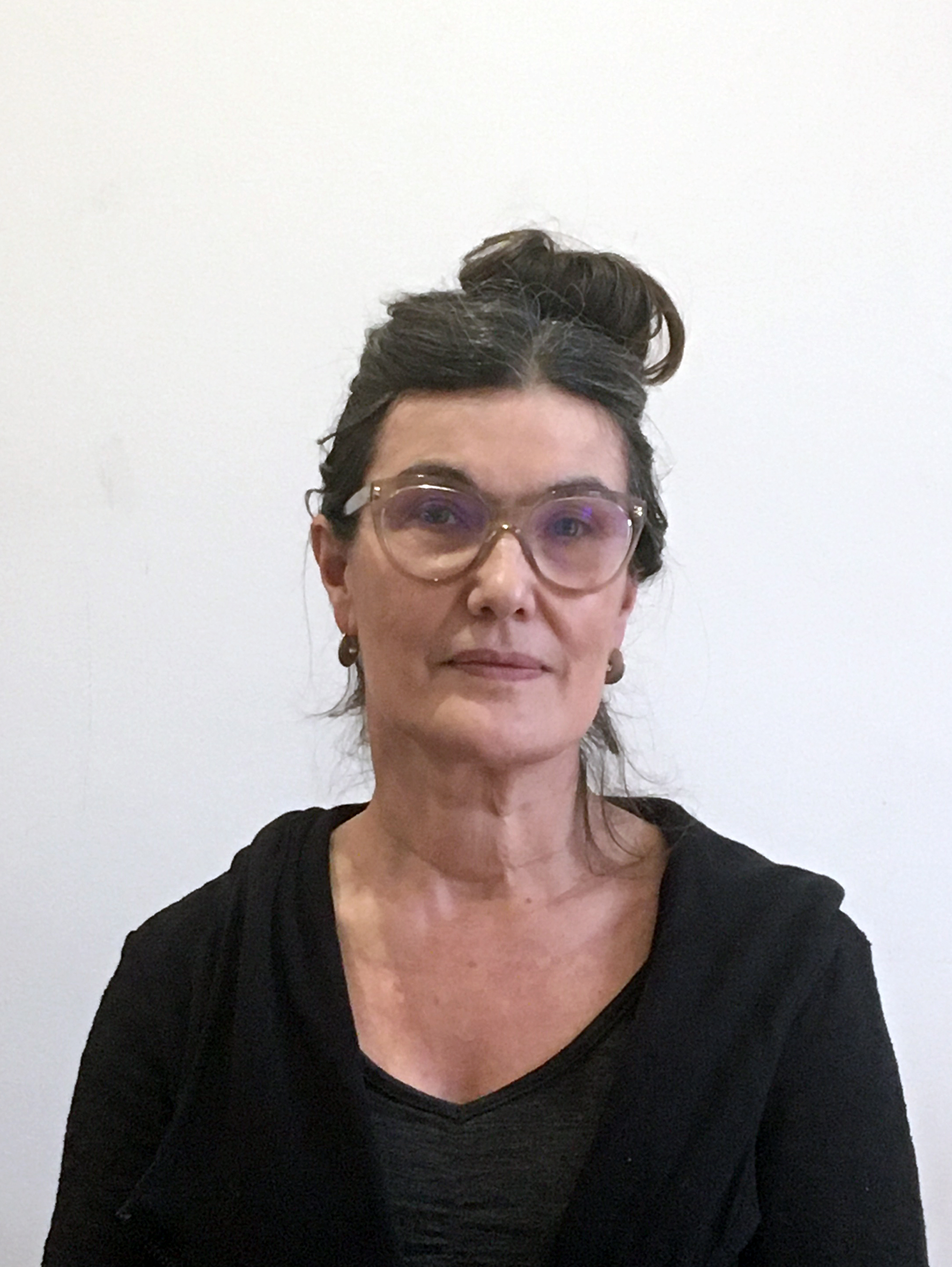
- Waeckerlé in 2021
- Born: Morocco
- Education: Sir John Cass College; Slade School of Fine Art (MA)
- Occupations: Artist; musician; composer
- Website: ewaeckerle.com

Emmanuelle Waeckerlé is an experimental musician, composer, and multidisciplinary artist based in London. Her text scores, publications, and performances explore the materiality and musicality of language while proposing playful encounters with "our interior or exterior landscape and each other."

== Biography ==
Born in Morocco to French parents, Waeckerlé later moved to London (in October 1984). She studied photography at Sir John Cass College (now London Metropolitan University), and completed an MA in fine art at the Slade School of Fine Art with Stuart Brisley and Liz Rhodes in 1996.

Her recordings include A Direction out There – Readwalking (with) Thoreau (stylised in lowercase) and Ode (owed) to O released by Edition Wandelweiser records. The latter is based on sonic iterations and conceptual reductions of her critically acclaimed book Reading (Story of) O, published in 2015 by Uniformbooks, which engages with the infamous erotic novel Story of O (Anne Desclos, 1954). Waeckerlé has also presented the work at conferences as a lecture performance. Her novel work Jungle Fever encourages listeners to explore their own environments as new sonic landscapes. Her work PRAELUDERE, prompted by the fact that in French a ballad is both a song and a walk, uses writing and walking understood here as simultaneous acts of marking, mapping and reading space. Slow March is an audio-visual work and series of performances of a text score for a conceptual road movie and was an Artforum Critics Pick. It was performed in Paris, London, and Toronto (reviewed in Time Out by Sally O’Reilly, March 2002).

The interactive installation of VINST – a unique vocal instrument part human, part virtual – and the accompanying performance A Duet (Virtually) have been shown at a number of venues across Europe and America, including the New York City Electroacoustic Music Festival at Cuny Graduate Center (2009), Centro de Historia in Zaragoza (Spain, 2008), Theatre museum in London and DRHA conference in Dartington Hall in September 2006, Lagerhaus Neufelden in Austria in May 2006, LSO St Luke's festival in July 2005, EXPO 966 in Scarborough and INPORT International Video-Performance Art Festival in Tallinn / Estonia in June 2005. The project was funded by the prestigious 1 to 1 bursary ( 2000, LADA, arts council), and programmed in Max MSP and Jitter by Sebastian Lexer. It appeared in Performance Research: A Journal of the Performing Arts Volume 9, 2004 and was the subject of a case study on in mappings between scientific invention and artistic inspiration.

Waeckerlé's poetic text scores and artists publications are held in various collections - Bibliotheque Nationale de Paris, V & A, Tate Britain, Chelsea School of Art and the National Poetry Library in London. From 2007–2014 she was part of the small team that ran the Centre des Livres d’Artistes in Saint Yrieix la Perche in France, one of the 3 largest collection of artist books in France.

Waeckerlé is a keen improviser and long-standing attendee of Eddie Prévost's (of AMM and Scratch Orchestra fame) weekly London workshop and MOWO (MOPOMOSO workshop group), she is founder member of Bouche Bée (an improvising duo with occasional guests) and her text compositions have been performed by a•pe•ri•od•ic ensemble, APTL ensemble and Extradition ensemble. Waeckerle has taken part in Scratch orchestra's concerts and performances as well as performing of Cornelius Cardew works; The complete great learning (union chapel 2015…) and Nature Study Notes at Café Oto (2015) This was followed by a post event Scratch Orchestra activation: Nature Study Notes group at MAYDAY rooms and published in Stefan Szczelkun Improvisation Rites: From John Cage's 'song Books' to the Scratch Orchestra's 'nature Study Notes'. Collective Practices 2011 - 2017. Other projects include Walking in Air, an ongoing collaboration with Will Montgomery and invited poets, artists and composers, including Antoine Beuger, Marianne Schuppe, Stefan Thut, Ryoko Akama, Carol Watts.

In addition to her work as a performer and composer, Waeckerlé is a curator of the house concert series Cosy Nook which has featured experimental musicians Antoine Beuger, Marie-Cécile Reber, Marianne Schuppe, Stefan Thut, Marcus Kaiser, Nomi Epstein, Seamus Cater and Bin Li. She is the co-curator of here.here concert series in London and Farnham with Harrey Whalley (Music Composition and Technology at UCA Farnham), an ongoing research led collaboration focusing on a multidisciplinary approach to experimental music and multimodal compositional strategies. Four concerts per year are organized around a guest composer or a theme: research informed curation critically revisiting seminal works and bringing together our PhD students, musicians and composers from the London experimental music scene in contact with our international guests and their work. For the first year in 2019 the series invited Gildas Quartet (UK), Marcus Kaiser (Germany), Stefan Thut (Switzerland), Jessica Aslan and Emma Lloyd (UK), Greg Caffery (Ireland), and Marie Cecile Reber (CH).

As an educator Waeckerlé is a reader in fine art and relational practices at University for the Creative Arts in Farnham and director of bookRoom research and publishing platform for which she has edited a few artist books as well as collections of critical texts tracking the impact of the digital revolution on publishing practices, such as The Book is Alive. Her research interest lies in socially engaged practices, publishing as a critical and collaborative venture, postdigital interaction. She is one of the mentors of the Wandelweiser Composers Meet Composers summer residencies including Antoine Beuger, Joachim Eckl, Marianne Schuppe, and Jürg Frey.

== Performances ==
- I Confess, a performance/video work addressing depression, First International Naked Poetry Festival, August 1998, ICA.
- Lullaby for Pauline, homage concert to Pauline Oliveros, with Vocal constructivists, 15 March 2017, Café Oto, London
- Jungle Fever in Athens, Gestures of Resistance exhibition curated by Jean Wainwright, Romantso gallery, Athens, 20/30 April 2017
- Clay woman for Armel Beaufils, le Regard des femmes, exhibition and catalogue curated by Sharon Kivland, FRAC de Bretagne, Saint-Briac-sur-Mer, France, 1 July 2017 to 1 September 2017
- (Story of) / O(nly) / O(hh) daily performances for Klangraum 2017, Kunstraum, Düsseldorf, 18/23 July 2017
- Antoine Beuger & Emmanuelle Waeckerlé – "Speak // If You Can”: Text, scores, performance, 2 concerts at café Oto, performed by Antoine Beuger, John Eyles, Sarah Hughes, Petri Huurinainen, Charlotte Keefe, Will Montgomery, Artur Vidal and Emmanuelle Waeckerlé, London, 22/23 February 2018
- Ode (owed) to O, performed by E. Waeckerle and a•pe•ri•od•ic ensemble, Frequency series, Constellation, Chicago, 22 April 2018
- Training the senses: walking, workshop performance, Marres, house for contemporary culture, Maastricht, Holland, 13 June 2018.
- Bouche Bée, Mopomoso concert series, The Vortex, London, 17 June 2018
- (the) sound (of) images, Tate Modern, 13 October 2018
- Atelier Cardew / Nature Study Notes ENSA, Limoges, 23/26 October 2018
- London Experimental Ensemble & Iain Sinclair: Dark Before Dark, IKLECTIK, London, 19 July 2019
- Song of an intention, Hard Work, Milen End Cemetery, London, 8 September 2019
- More than a voice.., Hundred Years Gallery, London, 21 October 2019

== Publications and Recordings ==
- Walking in Air - Performance Research ‘On Air’, with Will Montgomery, (2022)
- The Way We Blend Podcast (2022)
- What is left if we aren't the world on Sounds of Absence | Various artists. (Gruen 209, Gruenrecorder, 2022).
- a direction out there, readwalking (with) thoreau (MA BIBLIOTHÈQUE, 92 pages, 105mm x 170mm x 60 mm, French flaps, Format: Paperback, ISBN 978-1-910055-85-4)
- a direction out there, readwalking (with) thoreau (edition Wandelweiser records, 2021)
- The Book is A Live (RGAP, 2013)
- Code X - paper, pixel, ink and screen (bookRoom press, 2015)
- Rise with your class not from it (bookRoom press, 2016)
- Reading (story of) O (uniformbooks, 2015)
- Ode (owed) to O (edition wandelweiser records, 2017)
- Becoming-one; A Duologue in Practice (Photography and Culture: Vol. 11, No. 2) by Waeckerlé and Manuel Vason
