= The Drill (album) =

Studio album by Wire
- Released: April 1991
- Recorded: 1989
- Studios: Worldwide International, London
- Genres: Alternative dance; alternative rock
- Length: 55:21
- Label: Mute (UK)
- Producers: Wire; Paul Kendall

Wire studio album chronology
Manscape (1990)	The Drill (1991)	The First Letter (1991)

The Drill is the eighth studio album by the British post-punk group Wire, released in April 1991 by Mute Records. The album comprises rerecorded and remixed versions of the same song, "Drill", with some versions featuring new lyrics. It is officially listed as an EP rather than an album despite its length of almost one hour.

== Background ==
The track "Drill" first appeared on 1986's Snakedrill EP, but Wire soon began to develop its arrangement in live performances, sometimes with a duration lasting up to 30 minutes. In 1989, the group decided to continue developing the track, only this time in the studio. Different renditions of the song were recorded by the group at Mute Records' London in‑house studio, Worldwide International, as an experiment intended to explore the new computer technology to be employed on their next album, 1990's Manscape. Although The Drill was actually recorded before Manscape, its release was postponed until 1991. This was, according to Wire's Colin Newman, because the album was not considered commercial enough to be the "new" Wire album.

The album is built on a Wire rhythm known as "dugga," which is explained on the album cover as "monophonic monorhythmic repetition."

== Critical reception ==
Professional ratings
Review scores
Source	Rating
AllMusic	2/5 stars
Robert Christgau	(dud)

In a retrospective review, AllMusic wrote, "Comprising experiments within the genre that would come to be known as electronica ... at the time of its release, The Drill ranked among Wire's more idiosyncratic ventures, but considering subsequent work in minimal electronica by other artists, it doesn't seem so strange now." Trouser Press called it "an entire nine-track album of "Drill" variations, none of which betters the original" and described it as "electro dance music that simply fizzled; lyrics that were once rewardingly abstract had grown simply incomprehensible."

Stereogum ranked the album 15th out of 15 in their 2015 "Wire Albums from Worst to Best" list. Describing the original version of the track "Drill" as "all industrial-thud rhythms and "dugga, dugga, dugga" mantra repetitions," they felt that "when the band builds something entirely new from its rubble, as on the disco-pop opener "In Every City" and the exotic loop exercise of "What's Your Desire," The Drill reveals a band that hasn't lost its ability to innovate." Elsewhere, the album grows "tedious and redundant." They concluded that if the album is a failure, "it's a noble one, proving that Wire still found a way to craft something halfway interesting out of running a single track into the ground."

== Track listing ==
All tracks are written by Wire.

1. "In Every City?" – 5:21
2. "What's Your Desire?" – 4:51
3. "Arriving/Staying/Going?" – 5:19
4. "(A Berlin) Drill" – 5:26
5. "Do You Drive? (Turn Your Coat)" – 4:52
6. "Jumping Mint?" – 5:56
7. "Did You Dugga?" – 5:48
8. "Where Are You Now?" – 5:28

CD bonus track

9. "(A Chicago) Drill" (Live) – 12:22

== Personnel ==
Wire

- Colin Newman
- Graham Lewis
- Bruce Gilbert
- Robert Gotobed

Production

- Wire – production [2, 3, 5–8]
- Paul Kendall – production [2, 3, 5–8], mixing [1–3, 5–8]
- Gareth Jones – remix [4]
- Dick Webber – mixing [9]
- John Fryer – mixing [9]
