= The Third Day =

Third Day or The Third Day may refer to:

== Religion ==
- The resurrection of Jesus, the Christian belief that Jesus rose from the dead "on the third day" after his crucifixion
  - "On the third day he rose again", a line present in a number of versions of the Apostles' Creed

== Media ==
=== Film and television ===
- The Third Day (1965 film)
- The Third Day (2007 film)
- The Third Day (TV series), 2020

=== Literature ===
The Third Day, the Frost, a 1995 novel in the Tomorrow series

=== Music ===
- The Third Day (EP) by Wire, 2000
- Third Day, an American Christian rock band
  - Third Day (album), 1996 debut album

== See also ==
- On the Third Day, a 1973 album by Electric Light Orchestra
