= Eckl =

Eckl is a surname. Notable people with the surname include:

- Bob Eckl (1917–1961), American football player
- Franz Eckl (1896–1966), Austrian footballer
- J. B. Eckl (fl. 1970), Canadian songwriter, producer, and recording artist
- Otto Eckl (1922–1993), Austrian table tennis player
- Joachim Eckl (born 1962), Austrian Artist
