= Another Timbre =

British record label based in Sheffield

Another Timbre is a record label, based in Sheffield and known for its releases of free improvisation, experimental and contemporary classical music. It was founded by television sound recordist Simon Reynell, who also engineers and produces most of the label's recordings.

Many of the label's releases have received positive reviews in the UK and international press, and it has been the subject of several published articles, profiling the label's distinctive aesthetic. In addition to its release schedule, the label has organised concert events at the Huddersfield Contemporary Music Festival and Cafe Oto, London, and Reynell has occasionally commissioned composers to write new music for release and performance.

The label's first release was Tempestuous by improvising musicians John Butcher, Xavier Charles & Axel Dörner (2007). Reynell has stated that "most of the early releases [on Another Timbre] featured improvised music in the tradition of AMM and/or Derek Bailey's 'non-idiomatic' improvisation". The label has gradually released more 'composed' music, especially experimental classical music influenced by John Cage and Morton Feldman.

== Wandelweiser und so weiter ==
A key release in the label's history was a 6-CD box set, Wandelweiser und so weiter, released in 2012 and featuring composers associated with the Wandelweiser collective, whose music is generally very sparse and quiet, with frequent silences. These included Jürg Frey, Radu Malfatti and Michael Pisaro. The set also included music by younger composers influenced by this sound. Reviewers noted that the set "will surely come to be seen as a landmark release" and in subsequent label profiles the set has been described as having "introduced the music of the group to a whole new audience and helped establish it as one of the most influential forces in Western experimental music today".

== Other significant releases ==
In 2014, Another Timbre released a double album of music by the UK composer Laurence Crane, Chamber Works 1992-2009. This was the first release on the label to contain solely fully composed music, as opposed to 'open scores' (indeterminate music) that include some element of improvisation or choice. The album was a commercial success and was later re-printed.

In 2017 the label embarked on a series of ten albums focusing on Canadian composers, including albums of music by Linda Catlin Smith, Martin Arnold, Cassandra Miller and Marc Sabat.

The label has also released extensive recordings of the music of Morton Feldman: a two-CD box set including works for two pianos and a five-CD box set of his works for solo piano.

As of 2023, the label has released more than 200 discs.
