= The Digital Intervention =

British experimental electronic duo

- Origin: UK, France
- Genres: Electronic, electronica, experimental
- Years active: 2003-present
- Labels: Ici, d'ailleurs..., Parallel Series
- Members: Paul Kendall; Olivia Louvel

The Digital Intervention is an experimental electronic duo formed by British electro-acoustic composer, sound engineer, former Mute artist Paul Kendall and French-born British composer, vocalist Olivia Louvel. They began to work together in 2002 whilst in Paris. Their first collaborative track was La Louve.

Paul Kendall was responsible for Mute Records 'Parallel Series' which he set up in the 1990s, aiming to bridge the gap between classical electronic music and rock electronic music. 'Parallel series' moved to the French Ici, d'ailleurs... label. 'The Last Writes' was broadcast on Mixing It, BBC Radio 3. The track "Coma Idyllique" features arrangements by Alan Wilder.

== Discography ==
LPs

- 'Capture' (2003) CD. Ici D'Ailleurs

Also contributing to the album 'Capture' are Alan Wilder string arrangement on track 6, Coma Idyllique, Sébastien Libolt who plays accordion on the cover of 1930s song by French chanteuse Frehel, La Coco, and Dimitri Tikovoi bass on Essence, Coma Idyllique.

Compilations

- Oumupo vol. 3. Rubin Steiner & Luz (2004) CD digipack with booklet. Track remixed 'La Coco'. Ici D'Ailleurs
- Oumupo vol.1 The Third Eye Foundation (2004) CD digipack with booklet. Track remixed 'Coma Idyllique' Ici D'Ailleurs

== Participatory Project ==
- 'When The Sea Will Rise II' (2016) Acoustic Cameras invites sound artists and composers to annex the real-time flow of webcams located around the world. A proposal by Christophe Demarthe, co-edited by Optical Sound and la manufacture des Cactées

== Selected shows ==
- 2004 Cafe De La Danse, Paris (F) Festival Ici D'Ailleurs
- 2004 Le Grand Mix, Tourcoing (F) Festival Ici D'Ailleurs
- 2005 Batofar, Paris (F)
- 2005 The Sprawl, London (UK)
- 2009 Ososphere Festival, Strasburg (F), for Echos Flottants, a sonic cruise curated by Pierre Beloüin, performing with Black Sifichi
