= Joachim Eckl =

Austrian artist and social engineer

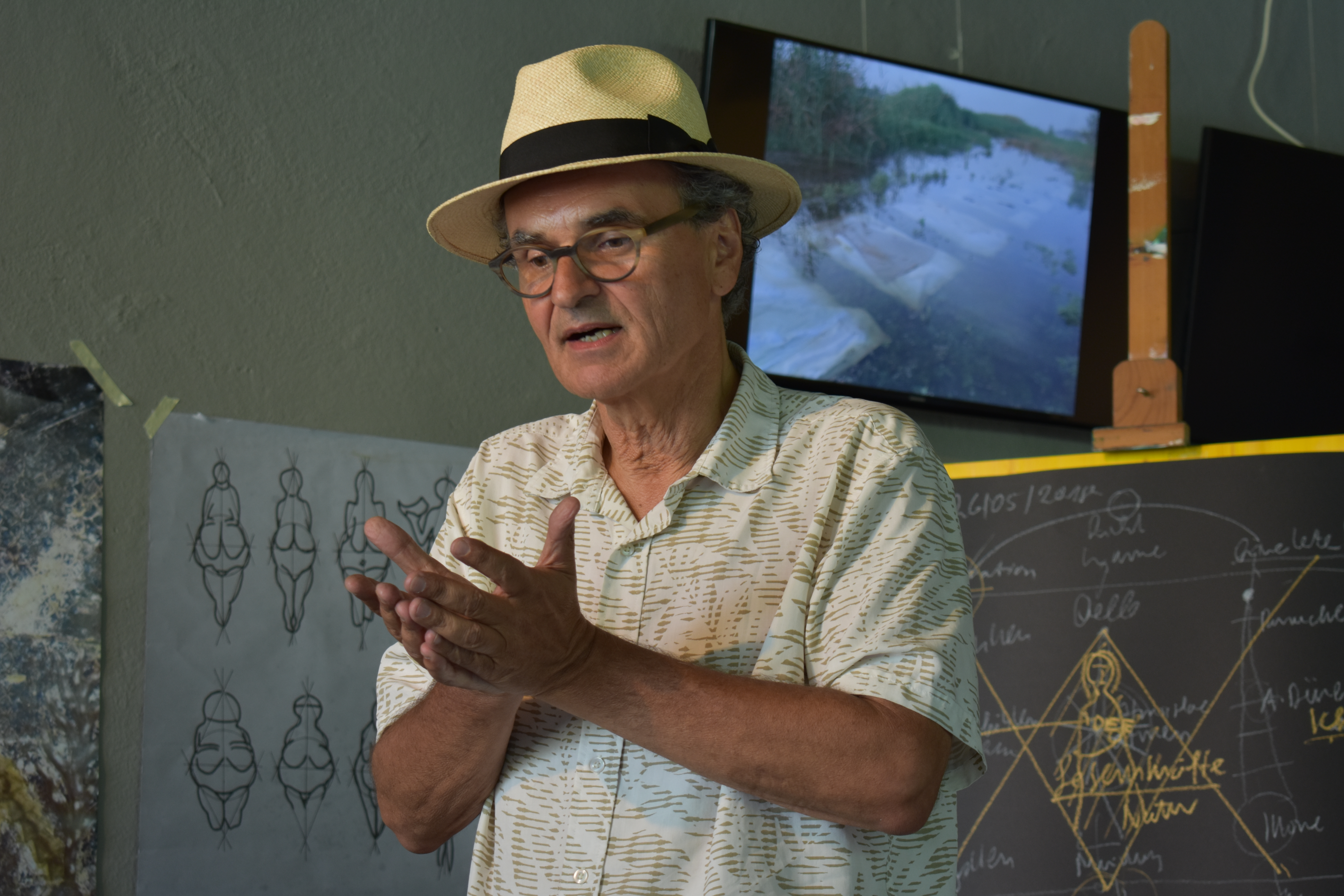
- Eckl in 2018
- Born: 11 April 1962 (age 63); Haslach (Upper Austria), Austria
- Known for: Social sculpture, drawing, art installation, patron, producer
- Movement: Social sculpture, Anthroposophy

Joachim Eckl (born 11 April 1962 in Haslach an der Mühl); is an Austrian artist, social engineer, patron, project leader, producer in the cultural and art world as well as the chairman of the cultural association heim.art. He is mainly known for his large-scale projects in connection with water and rivers in particular. His work was awarded the Green Prize of the Upper Austria and the Ford Environment Prize of the Austrian Federal Ministry of Forestry, Environment and Water Resources. He is married and has a daughter.

== Early life ==
Joachim Eckl grew up on the river Große Mühl. His ancestors were all millers; his great-grandfather erected in 1902 the first hydroelectric power plant on the Große Mühl river, which still stands and operates to this day. Joachim Eckl's views on the art and culture are therefore strongly influenced by the close connection of the humanity with the mysticism of the water. He finalized his psychology studies in New York and started to produce and create projects under his own name, but also under the moniker "heim.art". Although his main focus are the rivers in Upper Austria, where he resides, he conducted art installations related to the rivers Nile, Rhone, Jordan and others as well. He currently resides and operates offices in Neufelden and Linz, Austria. His latest project at heim.art includes hosting the Wandelweiser Composers Meet Composers Mentoring Project including fellow Wandelweiser composers/artists Antoine Beuger, Emmanuelle Waeckerle, Marianne Schuppe, and Jürg Frey.

== Art projects, works and collaborations ==
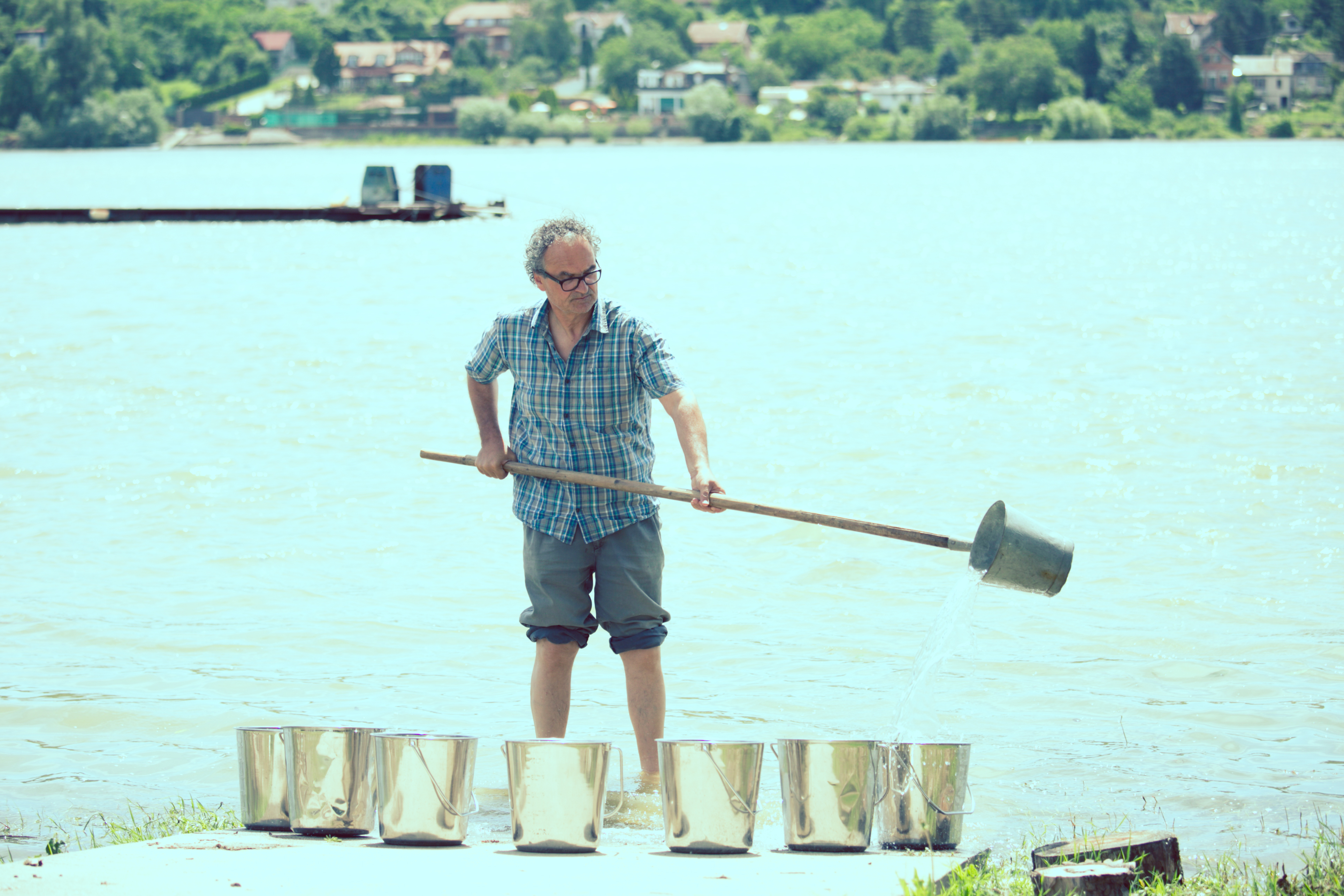
Joachim Eckl, water drawing.

Joachim Eckl's first major production was a collaboration with Vito Acconci for the Werkstatt Kollerschlag, the installation Multi-Bed 2 in 1991. Further collaborations with other artists followed, like the exhibition "The Only One" with Georg Lindorfer, then exhibitions and collaborations with Tony Cragg, Jeff Koons and Christo and Jeanne-Claude followed. In 1997, together with the German artist Klaus Rinke, Joachim Eckl started a series of collaborations, with the most prominent opus being the design of the Pro Kaufland Shopping Mall in Linz.

In the 21. Century Eckl returned to his artistic roots and developed the water drawing performance – art installation, but also an intellectual and spiritual experience – named "Persönliche Schöpfung", a play on words in German, meaning personal creation and personal drawing at the same time. He organized 348 people to perform the water drawing and nightly sleepovers in the river bed of the Große Mühl, in order to raise awareness to the horrible state the river was in at the time in 2003. The federal government reacted and a new form of environmental protest was born. Eckl developed out of this success the "River to River" project, which led him to Cairo, Egypt and the 11th International Cairo Biennial. In Egypt he built an ice pyramid and ice sculptures of people in the Faiyum desert, photographs of which years later were used in the Kunst Im Bau exhibition 6 : 9 Weltversprechen, 13. January 2017 in Munich, Germany. In July 2017 the exhibition "Bleaching Time" for the Textile Center of Haslach and in September 2017 "River Talks" in the Chapel on OK-Platz in Linz took place.

=== Clean Water – Reines Wasser in Lentos Art Museum Linz ===
From 3 October 2014 to 15 February 2015 a 60-day creative water drawing activity took place under the name "Donau-Körper" that became an art installation named "Pure Water". The Lentos Art Museum in Linz helped to organize this project by Joachim Eckl, with a total of 60 teams each drawing 1,000 liters of water from the Danube, which were combined in containers, in order to create a unique sculpture that would display the amount of water that flows through the human body during the whole average human life span. The whole experience was recorded and can be viewed on the heim.art YouTube channel.

=== Hotel and Restaurant Mühltalhof ===
Joachim Eckl has created the permanent art installation "Landing spot for arrivals" at the entrance of the hotel and restaurant Mühltalhof, which is located on the banks of the Grosse Mühl and is known for the "Mühlviertler" natural kitchen on the haute cuisine level. Johanna Eckl, born Rachinger, the wife of Joachim Eckl, is the owner of this establishment together with her brother, Helmut Rachinger. The central point of this installation is a 350-million-year-old stone, a granite glacial erratic. On 20 August 2017 the hotel and restaurant Mühltalhof together with Joachim Eckl hosted this year's Gelinaz! Does Upper Austria Foodart Cooking Festival.
