= Margriet Hoenderdos =

Dutch composer (1952–2010)

Margriet Hoenderdos (6 May 1952 – 14 October 2010) was a Dutch composer. She was born in Santpoort, Netherlands, and studied piano with Thomas Bollen at the Zwolle Conservatory. She continued her studies in composition at the Amsterdam Conservatory with Ton de Leeuw, and worked in the electronic studio at the Conservatory. In 1985 she ended her studies and received a Prize for Composition.

After completing her education, Hoenderdos worked as a composer and taught music privately and at the music school in Zwolle. After 1987 she worked as full-time as a composer.

== Composition style ==
Hoenderdos' works are characterized by a rigorous methodological approach that rarely appears in contemporary Dutch music; a "radical research into the essence of sound". The relationships between various aspects of sound determine the structure of her works, creating not abstract but vital, colourful and even obstinate music. Hoenderdos does not let her emotions or experiences influence her compositions.

Since the early 1990s her exclusion of non-musical factors is also reflected in her titles, which are simply the month and year in which they were written.

Es verjüngt sich nach unten for right hand piano solo (1983) is based on the relationship between tempo and density.

In Lex inertiae No. 2 for solo viola (1989), the left hand has little to do while the right hand concentrates on various techniques.

De lussen van Favery (1990) is Hoenderdos' response to poetry by Hans Favery that he specifically asked her to set to music. Instead of creating a traditional song cycle to Favery's words, she created a woodwind quintet, framed as nine short movements.

Maart '98 (1998), for string quartet, relies heavily on uncoordinated glissandi of varying speeds, leaving the ear unsure whether a subtly coloured and delicate twine is taking form or steadily unravelling.

Juli '06 (2006), scored for unaccompanied soprano voice, is inspired by a poem written by Hoenderdos' partner Bas Geerts, in reaction to rhetoric from the White House, specifically President George Bush's 2003 State of the Union speech. It incorporates a mix of languages and is challenging to perform.

== Works performed ==
Oerknal, a collective of international musicians based in The Netherlands, presented a program of string quartets called "ongs and Labyrinths" for their 2017/18 season, featuring Hoenderdos' September '00, a ten-minute collage of delicate gestures and vertical sound blocks at once meditative and fleeting.

== Reception ==
In response to works by Hoenderdos including De Lussen Van Favarey (1990), Maart '98 (1998) and Juli '06 (2006, text: Bas Geerts), Samuel Vriezen said, "By their networks of structures these pieces create ambiguous labyrinths in which a striking music is hiding in plain sight. As you enter them by listening, I hope Hoenderdos' music will find you, and introduce you to its richly nuanced, ever changing universes."

== Selected works ==
=== Orchestral ===
- Het nieuwe verlaat for orchestra (1985)
- Hunker, schor en hasselaar for orchestra (1989)
- July '90 for orchestra (1990)
- Augustus '92 for large wind orchestra (1992)

=== Chamber and Solo Instrumental ===
- Blue Time for two pianos (1981)
- Camilla for flute solo (1983)
- Es verjüngt sich nach unten for piano solo (right hand) (1983)
- Bevalt u deze tuin [Do you Like this Garden] for guitar and cello (1986)
- Borrowed Flesh for organ (1986, rev. 1987)
- List for 11 wind instruments, piano and double bass (1987)
- ZICH-wederkerende bewegingen for 7 instrumentalists (1987)
- Gruis for Zwaanenburg alto flute (1987)
- Lex inertiae No.1 for harpsichord and 3 rattles (1989)
- Lex inertiae No. 2 for viola solo (1989)
- De lussen van Faverey for woodwind quintet (1990)
- Augustus '91 for piano solo (vorsetzer [automated]) (1991)
- December '91 for 2 Eb clarinets (1991)
- Juli '93 for string quartet (1993)
- Augustus '93 for string quartet (1993)
- Augustus '96 for solo piano (1996)
- July '96 for 6 percussionists (1996)
- January '97/DOORZICHTIG for saxophone quartet (1997)
- December '02 for viola solo (2002)
- Februari '03 for viola solo (2003)

=== Vocal ===
- Februari '96 for 6 male and 6 female voices (1996)
- July '97 for voice solo (1997)
- Juli '06 for soprano voice solo (2006)

=== Tape ===
- Bande Amorce (1983)
- Ballade op een balustrade (film score, dir. F. Jochems) (1984)
- De spiegelzaal (film score, dir. Jochems) (1985)
- Singularity IV (1999)
