= The Third Day (EP) =

EP by Wire
- Released: 2000
- Recorded: 29 November 1999
- Studios: Ritz Hotel, London, England
- Label: Pinkflag

Wire EP chronology
In Vivo (1989)	The Third Day (2000)	Read & Burn 01 (2002)

Professional ratings
Review scores
Source	Rating
AllMusic	4/5 stars

The Third Day is an EP by the English rock band Wire. It was released in 2000.

== Track listing ==
No.	Title	Length
1.	"Pink Flag (r1)"	3:56
2.	"Blessed State"	3:23
3.	"Mercy"	5:28
4.	"Art of Persistence (1st Draft)"	4:34
5.	"Pink Flag (r2)"	3:36

== Personnel ==
Wire

- Bruce Gilbert – guitar
- Robert Gotobed – drums
- Graham Lewis – bass guitar, vocals
- Colin Newman – guitar, vocals

Production

- Denis Blackham – mastering
- Colin Newman – mixing
