= Read & Burn 03 =

EP by Wire
- Released: 13 November 2007
- Label: Pinkflag

Wire EP chronology
Read & Burn 02 (2002)	Read & Burn 03 (2007)	Strays (2011)

Professional ratings
Review scores
Source	Rating
AllMusic	4/5 stars
Dusted	(favourable)
hybridmagazine.com	(favourable)
Pitchfork	7.2/10
Prefix	7.0/10
Record Collector	3/5 stars
Treble	(favourable)

Read & Burn 03 is an EP by English rock band Wire. It is the third entry in their Read & Burn EP series. It was released on 13 November 2007, five years after Read & Burn 01 and 02.

== Track listing ==
No.	Title	Length
1.	"23 Years Too Late"	9:46
2.	"Our Time"	4:33
3.	"No Warning Given"	5:26
4.	"Desert Diving"	5:33
