= Michael Pisaro =

American guitarist and composer (b.1961)

Michael Pisaro (born 1961 in Buffalo, New York) is an American guitarist and composer. A member of the Wandelweiser Composers Ensemble, he has composed over 80 works for a great variety of instrumental combinations, including several pieces for variable instrumentation.

== Works ==
A particularly large category of Pisaro's works are solo works, notably a series of 36 pieces (grouped into six longer works) for the three-year, 156-concert series organized by Carlo Inderhees at the Zionskirche in Berlin-Mitte from 1997 to 1999. Another solo piece, pi (1-2594), was performed in installments by the composer on 15 selected days in February 1999, in Evanston, Illinois, in Düsseldorf in 2000–2001 and at the Huddersfield Contemporary Music Festival in 2009 (with pianist Philip Thomas).

Pisaro has also devoted works to poets including among others, his harmony series, which functions as both a kind of poetic anthology and a collection of indeterminate scores, and July Mountain which is a translation of the poem of the same name by Wallace Stevens, into a score for field recordings and several layers of percussion. Reading Spinoza is an accompanied reading of the Fifth Book of Baruch Spinoza's Ethics.

Much of Pisaro's recent work for percussion has been recorded by frequent collaborator Greg Stuart. Another recent interest has been in field recording, which began to be represented in Pisaro's Transparent City (2004-2006).

In 2004, he translated Oswald Egger's Nichts, das ist (Suhrkamp, 2001).

== International ==
Pisaro's work is frequently performed in the U.S. and in Europe, in music festivals and in many smaller venues. It has been selected twice by the ISCM jury for performance at World Music Days festivals (Copenhagen,1996; Manchester, 1998) and has also been part of festivals in Hong Kong (ICMC, 1998), Vienna (Wien Modern,1997), Aspen (1991), Chicago (New Music Chicago, 1990, 1991), Glasgow (INSTAL, 2009), Berlin (MaerzMusik, 2010), Sonorités (Montpellier, 2011) and others. He has held composer residencies in Germany (Künstlerhof Schreyahn), Switzerland (Forumclaque/Baden), Israel (Miskenot Sha'ananmim), Greece (EarTalk) and in the U.S. (Birch Creek Music Festival/Wisconsin). Concert length portraits of his music have been given in Munich, Los Angeles, London, Tokyo, Mexico City, Seattle, Jerusalem, Madrid, Santiago, Vienna, New York, Brussels, Curitiba (Brazil), Berlin, Chicago, Düsseldorf, Zürich, Charleston, Toronto, Cologne, Aarau and elsewhere.

His scores are published by Edition Wandelweiser (Germany). Recordings of his work (solo and collaborative) have been released by Edition Wandelweiser Records, Winds Measure Recordings, Erstwhile Records, Another Timbre, slubmusic, Cathnor, Potlatch, HEM Berlin, Bánh Mì Verlag and on Pisaro's own imprint, Gravity Wave. He has performed many of his own works and those of close associates Antoine Beuger, Kunsu Shim, Jürg Frey and Manfred Werder, as well as works from the experimental tradition, especially John Cage, Christian Wolff, Robert Ashley and George Brecht.

Before joining the composition faculty at the California Institute of the Arts (where he is located presently), he taught music composition and theory at Northwestern University from 1986 to 2000.

Pisaro received a 2005-2006 Foundation for Contemporary Arts Grants to Artists Award.
