= Thé Lau =

Dutch musician and writer (1952–2015)

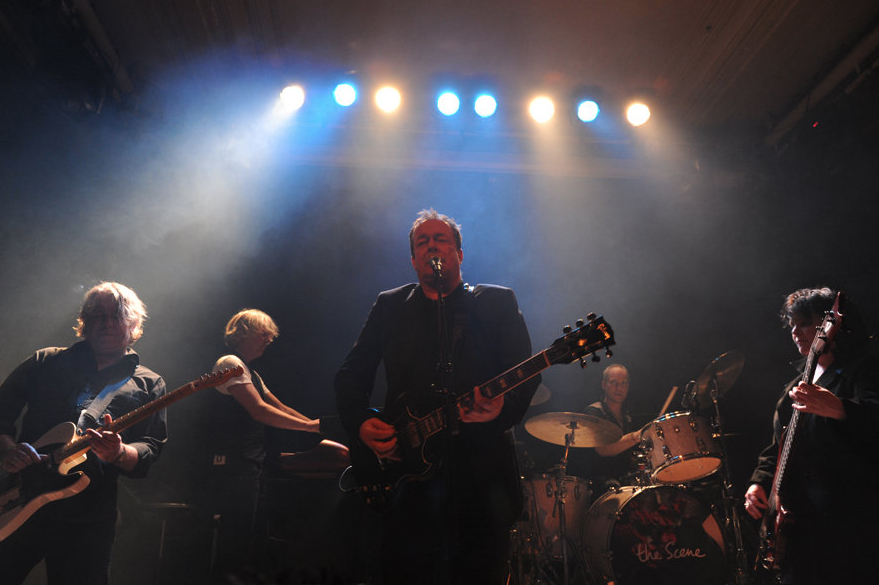
- Thé Lau with The Scene, June 2014

Background information
- Born: Matheus Josephus Lau; 17 July 1952; Bergen, North Holland, Netherlands
- Died: 23 June 2015 (aged 62) Amsterdam, Netherlands
- Genres: Rock music
- Occupations: Guitarist, vocalist, lyricist
- Instruments: Guitar, vocals
- Years active: 1973–2014
- Formerly of: The Scene, Neerlands Hoop Express
- Website: thelau.nl

Matheus J. "Thé" Lau (17 July 1952 – 23 June 2015) was a Dutch musician and writer. Besides his solo career, he was the lead singer of the Dutch band The Scene. He was born in Bergen, North Holland.

== Music career ==
Lau played guitar in several bands and was a member of the Dutch band Neerlands Hoop Express. In 1979 he founded the band The Scene with Lau as lead singer and guitarist. The band's most well-known songs are "Blauw" and "Iedereen is van de wereld".

Lau left The Scene in 2003 and got touring with keyboardist Jan-Peter Bast in Dutch theaters. In October 2006, he resumed the tour under title Tempel der liefde accompanied by Jan-Peter Bast and tango string quartet Pavadita.

In 2007, The Scene had a reunion with Lau and three former band members. (Jeroen Booy, Emilie Blom van Assendelft and Otto Cooymans) They started touring again, and released a new CD.

In 2010, Thé Lau topped the Dutch charts with a collaboration with Dutch rapper Lange Frans, "Zing voor me".

== Writing career ==
In 2000, he made his debut in literature by writing short stories De sterren van de hemel (meaning the stars of heaven). In 2003, his writings were published in a book titled Thé Lau, de teksten. His first novel was Hemelrijk in 2004, followed by a collection of music stories entitled In de dakgoot (meaning in the gutter). In 2007 his work has appeared in 1000 vissen, a collection of stories about the Amsterdam's neighborhood Spaarndammerbuurt where Thé Lau had been living and working for 15 years.

== Illness and death ==
Lau was diagnosed with throat cancer in August 2013 and was told he could not be cured in April 2014. He died in June 2015 in Amsterdam.

== In popular culture ==
- In vrijheid is a 2005 song Thé Lau wrote as a liberation song for Bevrijdingsdag (Liberation Day in the Netherlands). He performed it on May 5, 2005 and the song became very popular for the annual celebrations of the Day.
- Thé Lau was part of the Dutch "Ticket For Tibet" event and took part in the album release of the collective in 2008.

== Discography ==
Source for Thé Lau discography / Source for The Scene discography:

=== Albums ===
with The Scene

- 1980: The Scene
- 1985: This is real
- 1988: Rij rij rij
- 1991: Blauw (NED #41)
- 1992: Open (NED #26)
- 1993: Avenue de la Scene (NED #34)
- 1994: The Scene Live (NED #43)
- 1996: Arena (NED #35)
- 1997: 2 Meter Sessies (NED #53)
- 2000: Rauw, hees, teder – Het beste van (NED #69)
- 2007: 2007 (NED #79)
- 2009: Liefde op doorreis (NED #46)
- 2012: Code (NED #44)

Solo

- 1998: 1998
- 2002: De God van Nederland (re-released in 2004 with the bonus CD Overspel)
- 2006: Tempel der liefde (NED #63)
- 2014: Platina Blues

=== Singles ===
with The Scene

Non-charting

- 1980: "Young Dogs, Young Blood
- 1982: "The Beat" / "Bliss"
- 1982: "Stappen" / "Allied Cigarettes"
- 1986: "S.E.X."
- 1987: "Ritme"
- 1987: "Wereld"
- 1988: "Borderline"
- 1988: "Rij rij rij"
- 1989: "Rauw hees teder"

Charting

- 1990: "Rigoreus" (NED #68)
- 1991: "Iedereen is van de wereld" (NED #62)
- 1991: "Blauw" (NED #15)
- 1992: "Zuster" (NED #33)
- 1992: "Open" (NED #40)
- 1992: "Samen" (NED #57)
- 1993: "Iedereen is van de wereld" / "Nieuwe laarzen (van een oude leest)" (The Scene / De Dijk) (NED #16)
- 2000: "Helden" (NED 84)

Solo

- 2003: "Brandende regen" (NED #91)
- 2005: "In vrijheid" (NED #48)
- 2010: "Zing voor me (Lange Frans & Thé Lau) (NED #1)

Collective

- 2004: "Lied voor Beslan" (by Artiesten voor Beslan) (NED #17)

== DVDs ==
- 2003: The show

== Bibliography ==
- 2000: De Sterren van de Hemel
- 2003: De Teksten
- 2004: Hemelrijk
- 2006: In de Dakgoot

Participations in collections

- 2007: 1000 vissen (bibliophilia by Uitgeverij Brokaat)
