= Legal Bootleg Series: 14 Sept 2002 Metro, Chicago =

Live album by Wire
- Released: 2010
- Recorded: 14 September 2002 at Metro, Chicago
- Label: Pinkflag

Wire live album chronology
Legal Bootleg Series: 08 Dec 2000 Queen's Hall, Edinburgh (2010)	Legal Bootleg Series: 14 Sept 2002 Metro, Chicago (2010)	Legal Bootleg Series: 10 Nov 1979 Jeanetta Cochrane Theatre, London (2010)

Professional ratings
Review scores
Source	Rating
Robert Christgau	A−

Legal Bootleg Series: 14 Sept 2002 Metro, Chicago is a live album by English rock band Wire. It was released in 2010.

== Track listing ==
1. "99.9"
2. "Germ Ship"
3. "Mr. Marx's Table"
4. "1st Fast"
5. "Read & Burn"
6. "The Agfers of Kodack"
7. "Comet"
8. "In the Art of Stopping"
9. "Spent"
10. "I Don't Understand"
