= Wandelweiser =

Musicians collective

The Wandelweiser Group is a collective for composers and performers of contemporary classical music. Inspired by the work of John Cage, the Wandelweiser Group writes experimental music, which is typically of a very quiet nature and often incorporates performance art. The musicologist Tim Rutherford-Johnson describes them as a "significant feature of art music in the 21st century."

Based around the publisher Edition Wandelweiser, they also have their own record label Wandelweiser Records. Prominent members of the group include Jürg Frey, Taylan Susam and Mark So.

== Overview ==
The Wandelweiser Group was founded in 1992 by Dutch-born flautist Antoine Beuger and German violinist Burkhard Schlothauer. In 1993 Swiss clarinetist Jürg Frey was invited to join, followed by American guitarist Michael Pisaro, Swiss pianist Manfred Werder, then Austrian trombonist Radu Malfatti the following year, then American trombonist Craig Shepard, and others. The group runs its own publishing operation, Edition Wandelweiser, and its own record label Wandelweiser Records.

The music of the Wandelweiser collective is characterized by sparse, quiet, fragile soundscapes incorporating frequent silences. According to Radu Malfatti, Wandelweiser music is about "the evaluation and integration of silence(s) rather than an ongoing carpet of never-ending sounds." Michael Pisaro suggests that Wandelweiser works, which often involve extended durations of hours or longer, offer an alternative relationship to time; these pieces "become not a duration to mark, but a space to occupy".

The composers John Cage and Morton Feldman are particularly influential to the group. According to Pisaro, "Beginning with the music of John Cage, it has become possible to see time as having its own structure: not as something imposed on it from the outside by music, but something which is already present, which exists alongside the music."

== Performers ==
- Makiko Nisikaze
- Mark So
- Quatuor Bozzini
- Cristián Alvear

== Composers ==
- Paul Beaudoin
- Antoine Beuger
- Dante Boon
- Daniel Brandes
- Johnny Chang
- Jürg Frey
- Ben Glas
- Mark Hannesson
- Eva-Maria Houben
- Carlo Inderhees
- Alex Jang
- Marcus Kaiser
- Jukka-Pekka Kervinen
- Ulrike Lentz
- Bin Li
- Sylvia Lim
- Radu Malfatti
- André O. Möller
- Anastassis Philippakopoulos
- Michael Pisaro
- Kory Reeder
- Christoph Schiller
- Burkhard Schlothauer
- Marianne Schuppe
- Sam Sfirri
- Craig Shepard
- Thomas Stiegler
- Taylan Susam
- Stefan Thut
- Gabriel Vicéns
- Steven Vinkenoog
- Emmanuelle Waeckerlé
- Manfred Werder
