= IKLECTIK =

Creative music venue in London, England

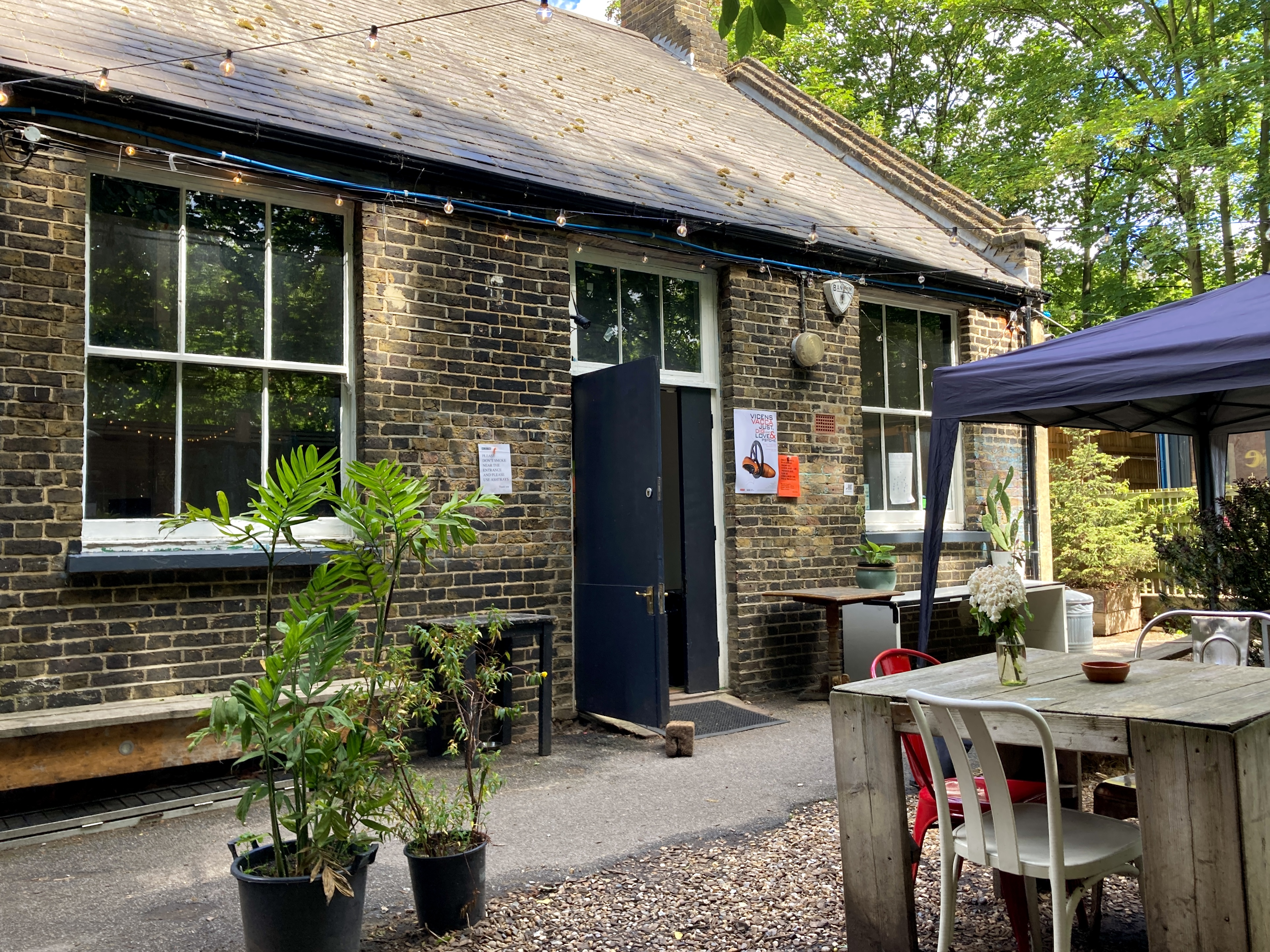
- The exterior entrance of IKLECTIK
- Interactive map of IKLECTIK
- Address: Peckham Levels, Rye Lane; London; England

Construction
- Opened: 2014

Website
- www.iklectik.org

IKLECTIK is a nonprofit creative organisation and music venue that hosts experimental, electronic and free improvisation music in Peckham, south London.

== History ==
Opened in July 2014, the venue was located in the Old Paradise Yard creative community on the northern border of Archbishop's Park.

The premises were formerly Kagyu Samye Dzong Tibetan Buddhist Centre and prior to that, the Holy Trinity School.

The venue hosted music performances, artist residencies, exhibitions, poetry readings, performance art, films screenings and book launches. Notable performers included John Butcher, Philip Jeck, Lolina, Thurston Moore, Pat Thomas, Eddie Prevost, Daniel Miller, Gareth Jones, Emmanuelle Waeckerlé, SolarX, Steve Davis, Puce Mary and Mark Fell.

In November 2023, the venue was served an eviction notice after their lease renewal was rejected. The final event took place on 20 January 2024 after which the organisation began crowdfunding for the future.

The venue reopened at the Peckham Levels complex (of venues, arts space and studios) in October 2025.

== Links ==
- IKLECTIK Homepage
