= Read & Burn 02 =

EP by Wire
- Released: 1 October 2002
- Length: 24:58
- Label: Pink Flag

Wire EP chronology
Read & Burn 01 (2002)	Read & Burn 02 (2002)	Read & Burn 03 (2007)

Professional ratings
Aggregate scores
Source	Rating
Metacritic	82/100
Review scores
Source	Rating
AllMusic	4/5 stars
Blender	3/5 stars
Pitchfork	8.6/10
Stylus Magazine	B

Read & Burn 02 is an EP by English rock band Wire. It is the second in a series of three Read & Burn EPs. It was released on 1 October 2002.

== Track listing ==
All tracks are written by Wire.

No.	Title	Length
1.	"Read and Burn"	2:35
2.	"Spent"	4:43
3.	"Trash/Treasure"	5:07
4.	"Nice Streets Above"	2:50
5.	"Raft Ants"	2:05
6.	"99.9"	7:38

== Personnel ==
- David Coppenhall – design
- Denis Blackham – mastering
- Colin Newman – mixing
- Graham Lewis – photography
