= Read & Burn 01 =

EP by Wire
- Released: 25 June 2002
- Label: Pink Flag

Wire EP chronology
The Third Day (2000)	Read & Burn 01 (2002)	Read & Burn 02 (2002)

Professional ratings
Aggregate scores
Source	Rating
Metacritic	78/100
Review scores
Source	Rating
AllMusic	4/5 stars
BBC Music	(favourable)
Blender	4/5 stars
Robert Christgau	A−
Mojo	4/5 stars
NME	8/10
Pitchfork	8.0/10
Q	3/5 stars
Stylus Magazine	B
Uncut	6/10

Read & Burn 01 is an EP by the English rock band Wire. It is the first in a series of three Read & Burn EPs. It was released on 25 June 2002.

== Critical reception ==
Exclaim! praised "the quality of the material and the genuine fire and raw riffage the band has captured on this recording, invigorating their art with punk yet again." Trouser Press called the EP "fast, loud and hectoring," writing that "more than the sound itself, the attitude and sheer energy of Read & Burn 01 is what gestures back to 1977, as Wire channels the spirit of Pink Flag into a hardcore digital context."

== Track listing ==
All tracks are written by Wire.

No.	Title	Length
1.	"In the Art of Stopping"	3:34
2.	"I Don't Understand"	3:17
3.	"Comet"	3:17
4.	"Germ Ship"	1:51
5.	"1st Fast"	1:41
6.	"The Agfers of Kodack"	3:13

== Personnel ==
Production

- Denis Blackham – mastering
- Dave Coppenhall – album design
- Graham Lewis – images
- Colin Newman – engineering, mixing
