= Paul Kendall =

Background information
- Also known as: PK, Piquet
- Born: Paul Kendall; 18 November 1954 (age 71)
- Genres: Electronic, electroacoustic, avant-garde
- Occupations: Sound engineer, composer, mixer, record producer
- Labels: EMI; Mute Records; Ici, d'ailleurs...; Parallel Series; Cat Werk Imprint; Ant-Zen

Paul Kendall is a composer, producer and visual artist, primarily known as a sound engineer, mixer, mainly through his extensive career at Mute Records and his collaborations with Alan Wilder of Recoil.

== Career ==
Kendall was born in 1954. In 1973 he went to York University to study maths, dropping out after nine months. While at university he began experimenting with the VCS3 synth and tape manipulation. On his return to London he worked in Barclays Bank for nine and a half years, which allowed him to continue working on music. He set up a small demo recording studio in Covent Garden with two friends, which gave him first hand experience of recording techniques.

When his mother died in 1984, he left Barclays and built a 16-track studio in his home. During this period his first wife had become a member of Fad Gadget, through which he met Daniel Miller, head of Mute Records, and began working for Miller in his newly established Worldwide International studio, the beginning of a long collaboration with many Mute artists including Renegade Soundwave, I Start Counting, Barry Adamson, Miranda Sex Garden, Nitzer Ebb, Wire, Depeche Mode, and eventually Recoil.

Around Christmas 1990, Kendall started using an Apple Mac computer and Sound Designer software from Digidesign, which gave him more possibilities for ordering and controlling sound. He set up The Parallel Series, a sub-label of Mute. The four Parallel Series releases were Void In by Andrei Samsonov, Orr by Gilbert Hampson Kendall, (with Bruce Gilbert and Robert Hampson), The Faulty Caress by Piquet, and Displaced Links by Kendall Turner Overdrive (with Simon Fisher Turner). In 2003, another Parallel series was released through French label Ici, d'ailleurs... and their electronic division 0101, Capture by The Digital Intervention (with Olivia Louvel).

Kendall returned to England in 2007 after five years in Paris. This coincided with the release of Recoil's subHuman, and Kendall worked closely with Alan Wilder in the preparation of Selected, leading to his first experience of touring. "A Strange Hour" with Alan and Paul was presented throughout Europe, Russia, North, Central, and South America between February 2010 and November 2011.

== Sussex releases ==
- Angleterror, Cat Werk Imprint, 01.10.11, digital. The majority of the work on this album was created between 2002 and 2007 during his time in Paris.
- Family Value Pack CD, Ant-Zen, 2014.
- From the Penman Press Audio-Graphic Box Set, A5 copies of original pen & ink artworks scanned and printed by the artist + a CD of an enhanced Angleterror mastered by AGF, Cat Werk Imprint, 2016
