= Paul E. Beaudoin =

American composer (born 1960)

Paul Beaudoin
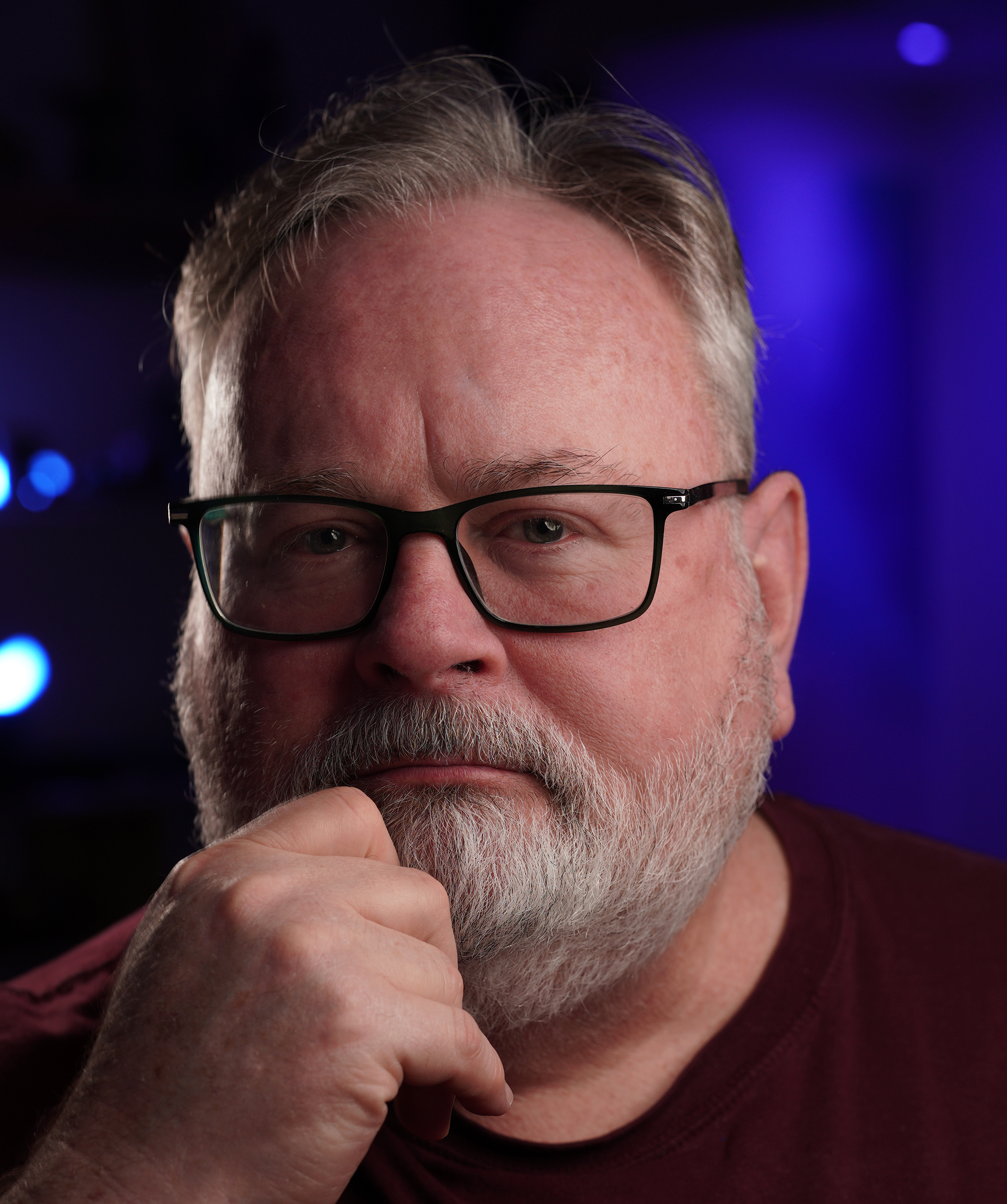
- Paul Beaudoin, composer and interdisciplinary artist
- Born: April 10, 1960 (age 66); Hialeah, Florida, U.S.
- Education: University of Miami (B.M.); New England Conservatory (M.M.); Brandeis University (Ph.D.)
- Occupations: Composer, visual artist, writer
- Notable work: only this, is all there is; who I talk to when you are not here; brook line(s); i am to think of you; Echo & After
- Website: paulbeaudoin.net

Paul E. Beaudoin (born 10 April 1960) is an American composer, visual and interdisciplinary artist, and writer. His work engages sound, image, and text across composition, installation, video, and photography. A Fulbright Fellow to Estonia, his projects have been presented at festivals and galleries internationally.

== Early life and education ==
Beaudoin was born in Hialeah, Florida. He earned a Bachelor of Music degree from the University of Miami in 1983, a Master of Music from the New England Conservatory in 1987, and a Ph.D. in music theory and composition from Brandeis University in 2002.

== Career ==
During the early part of his career, Beaudoin taught at several American universities, including Northeastern University, Fitchburg State University, the Boston Conservatory, the Preparatory Division of the New England Conservatory of Music, and Rhode Island College. He received recognition for work in online music education, receiving the Blackboard Exemplary Course Award for innovative e-learning. His early compositions include dance re:pnmr, premiered by pianist Guy Livingston; he was commissioned by Boston Symphony Orchestra flutist Fenwick Smith for windows of mythology, and his string quartet ein brief was performed by the Lydian String Quartet and the June in Buffalo Quartet.

=== Shift to interdisciplinary practice ===
Beaudoin's 2015 Fulbright Fellowship to Estonia coincided with an expansion of his practice into visual and spatial domains. Drawing on post-Cagean ideas of indeterminacy and silence, he began to approach sound, image, and text as parallel forms of notation, each framing perception and duration. Subsequent installations and time-based works treat listening as both a visual and acoustic experience, extending musical form into video, photography, and performance.

Among projects in this period is Chapter 7 – what trembles is not broken (Pride Museum Brussels, 2025), a long-duration environment for electronics, clarinet, and video that addresses concealment and fear; during a residency at the Alice Boner Institute in Varanasi he produced who I talk to when you are not here (2024), a series of paintings and drawings in response to the local sonic and mythic landscape; and between 2022 and 2024 he developed the extended photographic essay i am to think of you, published by Boys! Boys! Boys!, exploring intimacy, memory, and visibility. His solo exhibition of large format photographics teise valguses / in another light was featured in the outdoor Vali Gallery in Teleskivi Creative City.

His interdisciplinary works have been presented at the Pride Museum (Brussels), PrideArt (Berlin), KinoMural Festival (Wrocław), Vabaduse Gallery (Tallinn), and Tallinn Bearty (2022–).

== Selected works and premieres ==
Beaudoin's compositions often merge text, image, and electroacoustic sound within sparse formal structures. Early chamber works were introduced at the Wellesley Composers Conference and the Festival at Sandpoint, establishing an interest in rhetoric and form later extended through interdisciplinary projects.

In 2024 he received a commission from pianist Stephen Drury and the Los Angeles series Piano Spheres for brook line(s), written to mark the 150th anniversary of Charles Ives's birth. The work premiered at the Colburn School as part of the “Ives 150” celebration.

In the 2020s his focus turned toward long-duration and ambient sound environments. The cycle only this, is all there is (2024–25) and bright shining light (2023) employ gradual harmonic change and open temporal frameworks. His electroacoustic work detritus from the new tower of babel (2025) was recognized in Romania's Acousmignon International Sound Art Competition, where it ranked among the top audience-selected works.

== Selected recordings ==
Beaudoin's recorded catalogue documents a shift from acoustic chamber music to extended electronic sound fields. Early chamber works appeared on limited artist editions and university releases; by the 2020s his focus turned to studio-based ambient projects distributed digitally. bright shining light (2023) and only this, is all there is (2024–25) were featured for their exploration of duration and resonance. In 2025 he released A Space for Remembering on the UK label Driftworks. He has also published single and long-form recordings via Bandcamp and SoundCloud.

== Publications ==
Beaudoin's writing examines intersections of sound, image, and digital media through both scholarly and creative approaches. His essay “The Space Between: John Cage, Robert Rauschenberg, Stefan Wolpe and Bill Viola” appeared in volume 13 of the Journal of Black Mountain College Studies (Silence/Presence, 2023). He contributed “At the Border of Poetry and Music” to Resonance: The Journal of Sound and Culture (University of California Press, 2024). He also explored digital aesthetics in “Glitchscapes: Aesthetic Possibilities” for the Brazilian publication Glitch.Art.Br (São Paulo, 2023).

Beaudoin's doctoral dissertation, “Rhetoric as a Heuristic in the First Movement of Beethoven's Third Sonata for Violoncello and Piano, Op. 69” (Brandeis University, 2002), has been cited in Jeremy Yudkin and Lewis Lockwood's From Silence to Sound: Beethoven's Beginnings (Oxford University Press, 2020) in discussions of rhetoric and musical form. Earlier, he co-edited with Judith Tick the anthology Music in the U.S.A.: A Documentary Companion (Oxford University Press, 2008), and wrote “Managing Your Online Time” for The Chronicle of Higher Education (2013).

== Interviews and media ==
In 2024, Art Soul Life published an interview by Sarika Kumari examining his Varanasi series and its mythological themes; his work has also been profiled by Disquiet and Ambientblog. His interdisciplinary practice has been discussed in Metapsychosis; he has also appeared in 15 Questions and the “Artist Spotlight” series by Cities & Memory.

Since 2023, Beaudoin has hosted and produced the monthly international radio show Baltic Drift on the OnAirOnSite network. In 2025, he was featured on Estonian National Television for his solo exhibition who i talk to when you are not here.

== Honors and residencies ==
Beaudoin has participated in a range of international residencies and festivals. His work has been supported by a Fulbright Fellowship for research in Estonia and residencies at the MacDowell Colony and the Alice Boner Institute in Varanasi, India. In 2023 he presented the solo exhibition who i talk to when you are not here in Varanasi, and in 2025 exhibited at Vabaduse Gallery in Tallinn. In 2025, his sound and visual works were presented at the Pride Museum (Brussels), KinoMural (Wrocław), PrideArt (Berlin), and the Telliskivi Creative City (Tallinn). Detritus from the New Tower of Babel was recognized at the Acousmignon International Sound Art Competition in Bucharest.

== Memberships ==
- Estonian Composers Union.
- Estonian Artists Union.
- Wandelweiser Collective.
