= Jürg Frey =

Swiss composer and clarinettist

Jürg Frey (born 15 May 1953) is a Swiss composer and clarinettist. He is a member of the Wandelweiser Group.

== Biography ==
Jürg Frey was born in 1953 in Aarau, Switzerland. He studied clarinet in Concervatoire de Musique de Genève, composition under Urs Peter Schneider in Bern and trained in Basel as a teacher of the Alexander Technique. Frey co-founded the Lenzburg Music Forum, and has been artistic director of the Aarau concert series 'Moments Musicaux' for more than ten years.

Frey has been invited to workshops as a visiting composer at the Universität der Künste Berlin, the Universität Dortmund, Northwestern University and CalArts. In 1991 he was prize winner at the Boswil International Composition Seminar.

Frey has acted as a mentor at recent composer meet composer workshops including fellow Wandelweiser composers/artists Antoine Beuger, Emmanuelle Waeckerle, Marianne Schuppe, and Joachim Eckl.

== Music ==
Jürg Frey’s music is characterized by sparse, quiet, soundscapes. In a review in The Guardian, Frey has been described as a “master of calm instrumental textures… who explores silence as much as sound and writes egoless music that feels as though it’s always existed”. Writing in The New Yorker, Alex Ross compared Frey’s music to a “Mahler Adagio suspended in zero gravity”.
