= Antoine Beuger =

Dutch composer

Antoine Beuger (born 3 July 1955 in Oosterhout, Netherlands) is a Dutch composer, flautist, and music publisher. He is a founder of the Wandelweiser group.

== Biography ==
Beuger studied composition from 1973 to 1978 with Ton de Leeuw at the Conservatorium van Amsterdam. In 1992, he founded Edition Wandelweiser with Burkhard Schlothauer, of which he is artistic director, and in 1994 established the Klangraum concert series in Düsseldorf. He lives in Haan, Germany, near Düsseldorf. He is a frequently featured composer at the Donaueschinger Musiktage.
