= Casey Spooner =

American artist and musician (born 1970)

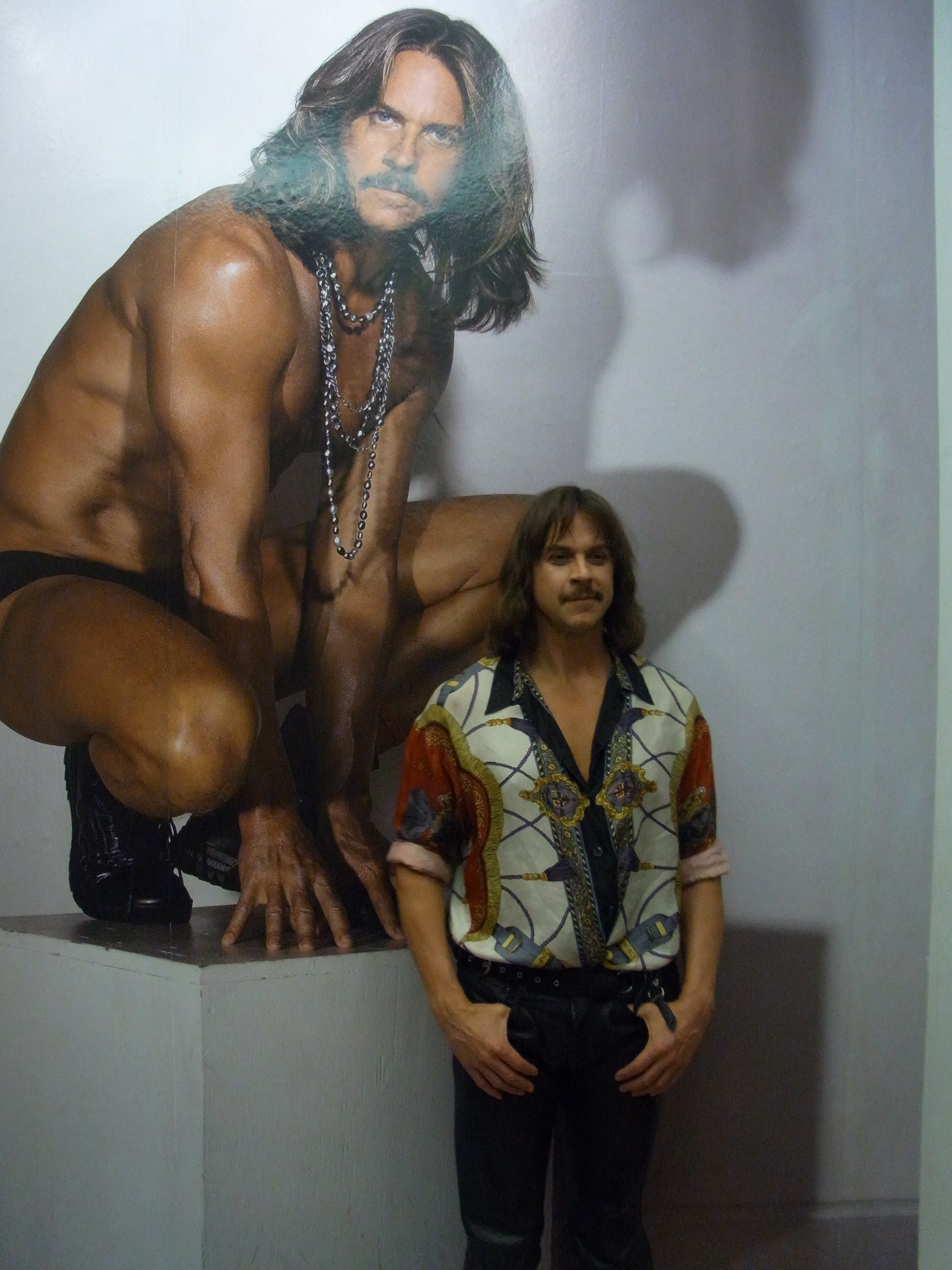
- Casey Spooner in 2018
- Born: Casey David Spooner; February 2, 1970 (age 56); Athens, Georgia, U.S.
- Occupations: Musician, artist

Casey David Spooner (born February 2, 1970) is an American musician and artist. He resides in Paris, Los Angeles, and New York City.

== Early life and education ==
Spooner was born in Athens, Georgia. He attended University of Georgia and later studied at the School of the Art Institute of Chicago.

== Work ==
=== Solo music ===
Spooner has contributed and worked on shows with Doorika, a performance arts collective based in Chicago and New York City.

Casey joined experimental New York performance ensemble The Wooster Group in 2007, taking on the role of Ophelia's brother Laertes in its production of Hamlet (which featured two Fischerspooner songs that were composed for the show).

In 2009, Spooner did a DJ tour before the album Entertainment came out. He was performing with the Wooster Group during this time.

In January 2010, Spooner distributed his first solo work online, "Faye Dunaway", as a preview of a 2010 solo album titled Adult Contemporary. The album, according to words by Spooner on Twitter, was recorded directly after finishing Entertainment.

In 2011, Spooner was the opening act for Scissor Sisters on the band's North American tour.

Spooner released a solo single in 2020 titled "I Love My Problems."

Spooner announced SPOONERHOLLYWOOD in 2021. The multimedia project consists of music, performance, film, and political commentary. He made a Ned Stresen-Reuter directed music video for a Julian Stetter-produced song called Blood is Blood. The video was available online as an NFT. The logo was created by Gareth Hague and the package includes photographs by Jun Lu.

=== Art and film ===
Spooner wrote much of the soundtrack to the 2004 movie D.E.B.S.

In 2012, he co-directed the independent film Dust with Adam Dugas. The film included Warhol Superstar Holly Woodlawn, artist Jaimie Warren, musician and painter Cody Critcheloe, designer Peggy Noland, and more.

Spooner, with electroclash and performance troupe Fischerspooner, produced two books with Italian based publisher Damiani Editore: Egos (2014) and New Truth (2015). New Truth explored the connection between pop culture and visual art and was edited by Meredith Mowder with text by Klaus Biesenbach, Gavin Brown and Jeffrey Deitch, amongst others.

Spooner exhibited and produced a catalogue in 2017 called "SIR: character studies, promotional materials, self actualization and contemporary photography 2013 – 2018" at Mumok. The exhibition included a photographic series by Yuki James which showcased Spooner, friends, collaborators, acquaintances, and anonymous men from the internet in various sexual regalia and leather-and-chains bondage. At the close of the exhibition, Spooner performed “Deinstall/Dismantle/Destroy”, destroying the imagery at the exhibition and making new works from paintings and collages.

Spooner announced a presidential bid for the 2020 United States presidential election on 4 July in 2019. He created a line of clothing and art objects to promote his campaign.

In 2021, he was the subject for artist Robert Knoke's “FANTASIES OF A HOMOSEXUAL PRESIDENT; POINTING A FINGER AT THE DOUBLE STANDARDS OF THE PATRIARCHY,” at the CultureEdit Gallery in Los Angeles, CA.

=== Fischerspooner ===
Spooner met Warren Fischer in 1998 while attending the School of the Art Institute of Chicago, and the two formed the musical duo group Fischerspooner. The group worked in performance, photography, and immersive enterprises such as museum exhibitions and musical acts. Spooner primarily wrote songs and performed vocals for the group while the classically trained Fischer composed the songs. The group grew to over 20 performers, most of whom were dancers and collaborative guest vocalists, and activated numerous spaces like concert halls, clubs, construction sites, art galleries, and more. "We started as a performance art piece about entertainment that ultimately became legitimate entertainment," said Casey Spooner, when talking about the group's origins in an April 2009 interview.

In 2002, the duo appeared on the television show Top of the Pops.

Fischerspooner's debut album, #1, has been released on several record labels, including International DJ Gigolo, Ministry of Sound and Capitol Records, and includes the singles "Sweetness", "Emerge", and a cover of Wire's "the 15th". In the final months of 2004, Fischerspooner opened FS Studios in New York City to the public for a few hours once a week, allowing people to meet the band and production team, as well as preview new video, music and dance projects that they were working on.

In 2005, Odyssey, the band's second album, was released. The album featured songs that were more structured and more accurately described as electropop than electroclash. "Odyssey was really about being on Capitol, which was this icon of classic American music, trying to embrace that cliché and find a way to embody it and infiltrate it and take it apart at the same time", says Spooner.

Spooner and Fischer wrote a majority of the songs for the 2006 film Grandma's Boy.

Entertainment was released in North America via the band's own label FS Studios on May 4, 2009, produced by Jeff Saltzman (The Killers, The Black Keys, The Sounds). An American and European Tour, known as Between Worlds, continued all through 2009. Like in other Fischerspooner's performances, Spooner was the main figure of the show.

The album Sir, executive-produced and co-written by Spooner's first boyfriend, Michael Stipe of R.E.M., and Boots, was released in February 2018. The song "Top Brazil" was released on January 19, 2018, along with an electro-pop music video which Billboard called "provocative." NPR interpreted the album as a retrospective collage of Reagan-era queer references framed in an undeniably contemporary style. Fischerspooner disbanded in 2019.

=== Madonna copyright claim ===
In November 2019, Spooner revealed that French music producer Mirwais and he had been working on a song, that was never released, for an unreleased Mirwais album. Mirwais later worked on the song with American singer Madonna, who contributed to additional lyrics and edits. The song was included on Madonna's 2019 album Madame X under the title "God Control". Madonna's representative states that Mirwais had not told her about Spooner's contributions, and offered a 15% credit. Spooner posted a demo of what became "God Control" on his Instagram as evidence of his input.
