= 154 (album) =

Studio album by Wire
- Released: September 1979
- Recorded: April – May 1979
- Studios: Advision Studios, West London, England, United Kingdom
- Genres: Post-punk; art punk; avant-pop
- Length: 44:41
- Label: Harvest
- Producer: Mike Thorne

Wire studio album chronology
Chairs Missing (1978)	154 (1979)	The Ideal Copy (1987)

Singles from 154
- 1. "Map Ref. 41°N 93°W" Released: 26 October 1979

154 is the third studio album by the English post-punk band Wire, released in 1979 on EMI imprint Harvest Records in the UK and Europe and Warner Bros. Records in America. Branching out even further from the minimalist punk rock style of their earlier work, 154 is considered a progression of the sounds displayed on Wire's previous album Chairs Missing, with the group experimenting with slower tempos, fuller song structures and a more prominent use of guitar effects, synthesizers and electronics.

The album is so named because the band had played 154 gigs in their career at the time of the album's release. The unusual title of the track "Map Ref 41°N 93°W" was based on a guess of the centre of the American Midwest by bassist and singer Graham Lewis; the location of these coordinates is coincidentally close to Centerville, Iowa.

Following the album's release, a falling out with the band's record label, EMI, as well as creative differences led to their breaking up in 1980, making 154 the band's last album up until their eventual reunion in 1985 and subsequent release of The Ideal Copy in 1987.

== Release ==
154 peaked at number 39 in the UK Albums Chart, the highest position the band has achieved. It was first issued on CD in 1987 by EMI Japan and later reissued by Restless Records in 1989. First editions of the vinyl album were accompanied by an EP, the tracks from which are included on the Harvest CD, issued in 1994, along with an additional bonus track. The 1996 remastered release, released on Wire's Pinkflag label as a digipack, does not contain any extra tracks, because, according to the band, such additions dishonour the "conceptual clarity of the original statements." In 2018 Pink Flag released a 3-CD Special Edition of the album. The first disc contains the remastered album, while the second disc includes 11 non-album tracks including the 4-song 154 bonus EP, two non-album singles and additional b-sides. The third disc contains the 16-song "Sixth" demo session.

== Music ==
According to Joe Tangari of Pitchfork: "By their third album, Wire scarcely resembled the band that a few years earlier had released Pink Flag. They had lost much of their rawness, but none of their edge, pushing into clanging, even chilling electronic textures and oddly moving their catchiest melodies to the front of the mix, conceding to pop convention even as they perverted it. Of course, pop success was about the furthest thing from their minds, as evidenced by the sonic apocalypse of 'A Touching Display' and the fractured synth chords of 'On Returning,' and the fact that they titled the album’s lead single and most accessible song 'Map Ref. 41°N 93°W.'"

== Critical reception ==
Professional ratings
Review scores
Source	Rating
AllMusic	4.5/5 stars
Encyclopedia of Popular Music	4/5 stars
The Guardian	5/5 stars
Mojo	5/5 stars
Pitchfork	9.1/10
Q	5/5 stars
The Rolling Stone Album Guide	4.5/5 stars
Spin Alternative Record Guide	7/10
Uncut	4/5 stars
The Village Voice	B

In 1979, shortly after the album's release, notable NME critic Nick Kent wrote that "154 makes 95 percent of the competition look feeble," Chris Westwood of Record Mirror stated that "Wire [were] achieving a lot of things other–and more recognized–names have been striving for," in a review of the album, and Melody Maker writer Jon Savage called the album a "musical tour de force." In a 1980 The Village Voice review, Robert Christgau wrote: "Predictions that these art-schoolers would turn into art-rockers no longer seems so cynical. Their gift for the horrifying vignette remains. But their tempos are slowing, sometimes to a crawl, as their textures venture toward the orchestral, and neither effect enhances the power of their vignettes, which become ever more personalistic and/or abstract."

In a retrospective review, Steve Huey of AllMusic wrote: "154 refines and expands the innovations of Chairs Missing, with producer Mike Thorne's synthesizer effects playing an even more integral role; little of Pink Flag's rawness remains." He continues, "If Chairs Missing was a transitional album between punk and post-punk, 154 is squarely in the latter camp, devoting itself to experimental soundscapes that can sound cold and forbidding at times." Rolling Stone wrote that the album "continued to complicate their [Wire's] sound with more elaborate arrangements, a thicker sound, and more complex, studio-enabled melodies." The Guardian critic Dave Simpson called the album "an unexploded firework in that no one dares return to it" and "a benchmark for unsettling adventures with guitars."

== Influence and legacy ==
Guided by Voices frontman Robert Pollard has cited the album as an influence, stating "154 was a bolt of lightning. When we started, we wanted to sound like a bunch of different bands. The songs were going to be short, sound like they were recorded in a bunch of different places. That was the Wire influence." In a 2014 interview with Magnet, he expressed his fondness for the album: "I've decided that the greatest album of all time is Wire, 154. Yeah. That's not even a top-20 band, but that's the greatest album. I listened to it again the other day, and it's the most intelligent, rewarding-with-repeated-listenings album that I ... it just never fails."

Guitarist Johnny Marr of the Smiths cited the album as a significant and long-lasting influence on his approach to guitar playing, stating that "Wire's approach to guitar was just something I couldn't ignore. It was a real pointer away from the blues-based guitar playing which dominated pop music – including punk – since rock music had started. As a young guitar player, discovering 154 showed me a world that was an alternative way of looking at the instrument. It has stuck with me all the way through my career." Lead vocalist and lyricist Michael Stipe of R.E.M. said that the track "The Other Window" "provided, in the early '80s, something to aspire to lyrically, [...] [a]nd the mood of the [track's] music is chilling and beautiful, like a memory."

One of My Bloody Valentine's last releases prior to reconvening in 2007 was a cover of "Map Ref 41°N 93°W" for a Wire tribute entitled Whore, along with other artists for other 154 tracks, including "40 Versions" by Godflesh and "The 15th" by Minutemen bassist Mike Watt. The song was selected as a favourite cover of the 1990s by Flak Magazine. Fischerspooner covered "The 15th" as part of their 2001 debut album #1.

"The 15th" was featured as one of the earliest and most crucial examples of shoegaze by Treblezine in its list A History of Shoegaze in 45 Essential Songs. In 2004, Pitchfork listed 154 as the 85th best album of the 1970s.

== Track listing ==
Credits adapted from the 2018 Special Edition.

Side one
No.	Title	Lyrics	Music	Length
1.	"I Should Have Known Better"	Graham Lewis	Lewis	3:52
2.	"Two People in a Room"	Bruce Gilbert	Colin Newman	2:00
3.	"The 15th"	Newman	Newman	3:05
4.	"The Other Window"	Gilbert	Gilbert, Lewis	2:07
5.	"Single K.O."	Lewis	Lewis, Newman (Note: The songwriting credits for 154 have been modified on all reissues since 2006. "Single K.O." was originally credited to Graham Lewis alone.)	2:23
6.	"A Touching Display"	Lewis	Lewis	6:55
7.	"On Returning"	Newman	Newman	2:06

Side two
No.	Title	Lyrics	Music	Length
8.	"A Mutual Friend"	Lewis	Newman	4:28
9.	"Blessed State"	Gilbert	Gilbert	3:28
10.	"Once Is Enough"	Newman	Newman	3:23
11.	"Map Ref. 41°N 93°W"	Lewis (Note: "Map Ref. 41°N 93°W" was originally credited to Graham Lewis, Colin Newman and Bruce Gilbert.)	Newman	3:40
12.	"Indirect Enquiries"	Lewis	Newman	3:36
13.	"40 Versions"	Gilbert	Gilbert, Newman (Note: "40 Versions" was originally credited to Bruce Gilbert alone.)	3:28

Bonus EP (included on 1979, 1987, 1989, 1994 and 1995 releases)
No.	Title	Lyrics	Music	Length
14.	"Song 1"		Robert Gotobed, Newman, Desmond Simmons	3:02
15.	"Get Down (Part I & II)"		David, Gotobed, Newman, Simmons, TV Smith	4:27
16.	"Let's Panic Later"	Lewis	Lewis	3:20
17.	"Small Electric Piece"		Gilbert	3:33

Bonus track (included on 1994 and 1995 releases)
No.	Title	Lyrics	Music	Length
18.	"Go Ahead" (single B-side)	Lewis	Gilbert, Gotobed, Lewis, Newman	4:01

Bonus tracks (1995 Japanese release only)
No.	Title	Lyrics	Music	Length
19.	"Stepping Off Too Quick"	Newman	Newman	1:22
20.	"Indirect Inquiries" (sic)"	Lewis	Newman	3:18
21.	"Map Ref. 41°N 93°W"	Lewis	Newman	3:49
22.	"A Question of Degree"	Lewis	Newman	2:56
23.	"Two People in a Room"	Gilbert	Newman	2:02
24.	"Former Airline"	Gilbert	Gilbert	1:12

Tracks 19–24 are demo versions that have also appeared on compilations such as Behind the Curtain and After Midnight.

=== 2018 Special Edition ===
Disc one (Original Album)
No.	Title	Lyrics	Music	Length
1.	"I Should Have Known Better"	Lewis	Lewis	3:52
2.	"Two People in a Room"	Gilbert	Newman	2:11
3.	"The 15th"	Newman	Newman	3:05
4.	"The Other Window"	Gilbert	Gilbert, Lewis	2:08
5.	"Single K.O."	Lewis	Lewis, Newman	2:24
6.	"A Touching Display"	Lewis	Lewis	6:56
7.	"On Returning"	Newman	Newman	2:06
8.	"A Mutual Friend"	Lewis	Newman	4:28
9.	"Blessed State"	Gilbert	Gilbert	3:28
10.	"Once Is Enough"	Newman	Newman	3:23
11.	"Map Ref. 41ºN 93ºW"	Lewis	Newman	3:40
12.	"Indirect Enquiries"	Lewis	Newman	3:27
13.	"40 Versions"	Gilbert	Gilbert, Newman	3:29
Total length:				44:48

Disc two (Singles, B-sides & Studio Recordings)
No.	Title	Lyrics	Music	Length
1.	"A Question of Degree" (single A-side, 1979)	Lewis	Newman	3:09
2.	"Former Airline" (single B-side, 1979)	Gilbert	Gilbert	3:19
3.	"Go Ahead" (single B-side, 1979)	Lewis	Gilbert, Gotobed, Lewis, Newman	4:03
4.	"Our Swimmer" (single A-side, 1981)	Gilbert, Lewis, Newman	Gilbert, Newman (Note: "Our Swimmer" and "2nd Length (Our Swimmer)" was originally credited to Bruce Gilbert, Robert Gotobed, Graham Lewis and Colin Newman.)	3:29
5.	"Midnight Bahnhof Cafe" (single B-side, 1981)	Lewis	Newman	4:30
6.	"2nd Length (Our Swimmer)" (single B-side, 1983)	Gilbert, Lewis, Newman	Gilbert, Newman	2:49
7.	"Catapult 30" (single B-side, 1983)		Gilbert, Gotobed, Lewis, Newman	5:05
8.	"Song 1" (154 EP, 1979)		Gotobed, Newman, Simmons	3:02
9.	"Get Down (Parts I + II)" (154 EP, 1979)		David, Gotobed, Newman, Simmons, Smith	4:27
10.	"Let's Panic Later" (154 EP, 1979)	Lewis	Lewis	3:19
11.	"Small Electric Piece" (154 EP, 1979)		Gilbert	3:31
Total length:				40:43

Disc three (Sixth Demo Sessions, December 1978, Riverside Studios, London)
No.	Title	Lyrics	Music	Length
1.	"40 Versions"	Gilbert	Gilbert, Newman	3:19
2.	"Ignorance No Plea (I Should Have Known Better)"	Lewis	Lewis	4:02
3.	"Blessed State"	Gilbert	Gilbert	3:11
4.	"A Touching Display"	Lewis	Lewis	5:19
5.	"The 15th"	Newman	Newman	2:30
6.	"A Mutual Friend"	Lewis	Newman	3:56
7.	"Once Is Enough"	Newman	Newman	2:39
8.	"The Other Window"	Gilbert	Lewis, Gilbert	2:09
9.	"Stepping Off Too Quick"	Newman	Newman	1:22
10.	"Indirect Enquiries (Version 2)"	Lewis	Newman	3:15
11.	"Map Ref. 41°N 93°W"	Lewis	Newman	3:50
12.	"Single KO"	Lewis	Lewis, Newman	2:24
13.	"On Returning"	Newman	Newman	1:49
14.	"A Question of Degree"	Lewis	Newman	3:02
15.	"Former Airline"	Gilbert	Gilbert	1:12
16.	"Two People in a Room"	Gilbert	Newman	2:03
Total length:				46:07

== Personnel ==
Credits adapted from the liner notes of the 2018 Special Edition.

Wire

- Colin Newman – vocals, guitar, backing vocals, distorted bass on "On Returning"
- Graham Lewis – bass, vocals on "I Should Have Known Better", "A Touching Display" and "Blessed State", backing vocals, percussion on "Once Is Enough", sleeve concept
- B. C. Gilbert – guitar, spoken word on "The Other Window", sleeve concept
- Robert Gotobed – drums, percussion

Additional personnel and production

- Kate Lukas – alto flute on "Single K.O."
- Tim Souster – electric viola on "A Touching Display"
- Hilly Kristal – bass vocals on "A Mutual Friend"
- Joan Whiting – cor anglais on "A Mutual Friend"
- Mike Thorne – production, synthesizer, piano on "Single K.O."
- Paul Hardiman – engineer
- Ken Thomas – assistant engineer
- Dave Dragon – art direction
- Brian Harris – typographic design

Bonus tracks

- Colin Newman – vocals, guitar, syndrum on "Go Ahead", saxophone on "Former Airline", keyboards on "Midnight Bahnhof Cafe", production on "Get Down (Parts I + II)"
- Graham Lewis – bass, keyboards on "Go Ahead", saxophone on "Former Airline", vocals and production on "Let's Panic Later"
- B. C. Gilbert – guitar, bass on "Go Ahead", saxophone on "Former Airline", production on "Small Electric Piece"
- Robert Gotobed – drums, production on "Song 1"
- Mike Thorne – production on "A Question of Degree" and "Former Airline"
- Paul Hardiman – engineer on "A Question of Degree" and "Former Airline"
- Ken Thomas – assistant engineer on "A Question of Degree" and "Former Airline"
- Wire – production on "Go Ahead", "Our Swimmer", "Midnight Bahnhof Cafe", "Our Swimmer (2nd Length)", "Catapult 30" and the sixth demo sessions
- Nick Glennie-Smith – engineer on 154 EP and the sixth demo sessions
- Daniel Priest – engineer on "Go Ahead", "Our Swimmer" and "Midnight Bahnhof Cafe"
- Steve Parker – engineer on "Our Swimmer (2nd Length)" and "Catapult 30"
- "A Question of Degree" and "Former Airline" recorded and mixed April 1979 at Advision Studios, London
- 154 bonus EP recorded and mixed July 1979 at Riverside Studios, London
- "Go Ahead", "Our Swimmer" and "Midnight Bahnhof Cafe" recorded and mixed November 1979 at Magritte Studios, Middlesex
- "2nd Length (Our Swimmer)" and "Catapult 30" recorded and mixed 1980 at Scorpio Sound, London
