= Aquaria (Boots album) =

Studio album by Boots
- Released: November 13, 2015
- Studio: La Fabrique, Saint-Rémy-de-Provence, France; Space 23 Studios, Los Angeles; Rare Book Room, Brooklyn, NYC
- Genre: Alternative R&B; experimental hip hop
- Length: 38:29
- Label: Columbia Records
- Producer: BOOTS; El-P; Carla Azar; Gabe Wax

Boots chronology
Motorcycle Jesus (2015)	Aquaria (2015)

Aquaria (styled as AQUΛRIA) is the debut studio album by the American record producer, singer-songwriter, rapper and musician Boots. The album has charted at number 14 on the Billboard Top Heatseekers chart in the United States.

== Background ==
Boots came to worldwide attention in December 2013 when Beyoncé released her highly successful fifth studio album Beyoncé, for which BOOTS had written and produced several songs. The songs include "Haunted", "Heaven" and "Blue". In May 2014, he released a mixtape titled WinterSpringSummerFall. In early 2015, he released a five-song EP Motorcycle Jesus, which served as a soundtrack album for a short film of the same title, directed by BOOTS. The release of his debut studio album Aquaria was announced by Columbia Records in a press release on August 20, 2015.

== Critical reception ==
Professional ratings
Aggregate scores
Source	Rating
Metacritic	68/100
Review scores
Source	Rating
AllMusic	4/5 stars
The Wall Street Journal	80/100
The Guardian	3/5 stars
The New York Times	80/100
NME	3/5
Clash	8/10
Pitchfork	5.9/10
Rolling Stone	3/5 stars

Aquaria has received generally favorable reviews from music critics. At Metacritic, which assigns a normalised rating out of 100 to reviews from mainstream critics, the album received an average score of 68, based on 17 reviews.

== Track listing ==
All tracks are written by Jordan Asher, except where noted.

No.	Title	Length
1.	"Brooklyn Gamma"	3:20
2.	"C.U.R.E."	2:55
3.	"Oraclies"	3:55
4.	"Bombs Away"	3:26
5.	"I Run Roulette"	3:48
6.	"Gallows"	1:41
7.	"Aquaria" (featuring Deradoorian) (written by Asher, Angel Deradoorian and Kirby Lauryen)	5:00
8.	"Earthquake"	3:01
9.	"Only"	4:16
10.	"Dead Come Running"	4:10
11.	"Still"	2:57

== Personnel ==
Credits adapted from AllMusic

Musicians

- Boots – vocals, bass, clapping, drums, farfisa organ, guitar, juno, Korg M1, mouth bass, piano, timpani, toms
- Carla Azar – drums
- Matt Barrick – claves, djembe, drums, juno, toms
- Nick Brown – drums
- Anthony Coleman – horn
- Haley Dekle – vocals, background vocals
- Deradoorian – vocals
- Jason Disu – horn
- El-P – drums, synthesizer
- Kirby Lauryen – background vocals
- Roger Joseph Manning, Jr. – Jupiter
- Gabe Wax – electronics, guitar, moog synthesizer, synthesizer

Technical personnel

- Boots – drum programming, engineering, mixing, production
- Carla Azar – additional production
- Matt Barrick – additional production
- Mario Borgatta – mixing assistant
- Martin Cook – assistant engineer
- Rich Costey – mixing
- El-P – additional production, engineering, production
- Florian Etien – engineering
- Nicolas Fournier – assistant engineer
- Elliot Lee Hazel – photography
- Joe LaPorta – mastering
- Gabe Wax – additional production, production
- Stuart White – additional production, mixing

== Charts ==
Chart (2015)	Peak position
US Top Heatseekers Albums (Billboard)	14
