= Emerge (song) =

Single by Fischerspooner

from the album #1
- Released: August 2001
- Genre: Electroclash; synth-pop
- Length: 4:48
- Label: International DeeJay Gigolo
- Songwriters: Warren Fischer, Casey Spooner
- Producers: Warren Fischer, Casey Spooner, Nicolas Vernhes

Fischerspooner singles chronology
"Emerge" (2001)	"The 15th" (2002)

"Emerge" is the debut single by Fischerspooner released in August 2001 from their debut album #1 . The song was originally released through International DeeJay Gigolo Records and later jointly re-released in 2002 by Fischerspooner's imprint label FS Studios and Ministry of Sound. In 2003, the song was released again by Fischerspooner's new label Capitol.

== Critical reception ==
Pitchfork Media placed "Emerge" at #100 on The Top 100 Singles of 2000-04 and at #243 on The Top 500 Tracks of the 2000s. Resident Advisor placed "Emerge" at #24 on the Top 100 Tracks of the '00s.

== Live performances ==
In 2002, Fischerspooner performed "Emerge" on the British music chart television programme Top of the Pops.

== In popular culture ==
"Emerge" has been featured in several films, such as D.E.B.S. and Coachella. The song was also featured in the American TV series Nip/Tuck (Episode 7: Cliff Mantegna), the Canadian TV series jPod (Episode 13: Colony Collapse Disorderon), and the digitally animated planetarium music show SonicVision. "Emerge" was included on the compilations albums Lektroluv by Dr Lektroluv (2002) and Ultra.80's vs Electro (2002). The Dave Clarke remix of "Emerge" was also used in the video game Gran Turismo 4 and included on its soundtrack. The Junkie XL remix was included in the soundtrack for the 2003 video game SSX 3.

In 2004, a mashup of "Everybody Wants You" by Billy Squier and "Emerge" was included on the Queer Eye soundtrack.

In 2004 "Emerge" was used in a skateboard video by Girl Skateboards entitled "Hot Chocolate". The music was used as a backing track and the company's sponsored skateboarders gave commentary of their experiences of filming the upcoming video, along with footage of themselves performing various skateboard tricks and stunts.

In 2020, Emerge closed Westworld season 3 episode 5 "Genre".

"Emerge" was used in two promos for VH1 in early 2003. The former mashed the song and Skee-Lo's "I Wish" together, with clips of music videos from artists such as Eminem and Madonna. The latter was of animated kittens from the online animation website Rathergood lipsyncing "Emerge" in space, which was done by British animator Joel Veitch. During months in 2022, Decathlon France uses this tune in its promo titled "Faire bouger le sport".

== Track listing ==
- Australian CD single
1. "Emerge (Original)" - 4:46
2. "Emerge (Dave Clarke Remix)" - 6:49
3. "Emerge (Dexter Remix)" - 4:53
4. "Emerge (Radio Edit)" - 3:28
- German CD, maxi single
1. "Emerge (Radio Edit)" - 3:09
2. "Emerge (Album Version)" - 4:46
3. "Emerge (Naughty's Peaktime Mix)" - 7:20
4. "Emerge (Adult Remix)" - 4:59
5. "Emerge (Terranova Remix)" - 4:40
- German vinyl, 12-inch single
1. "Emerge" - 5:00
2. "Emerge (Radio Slave Edit)" - 6:22
3. "Emerge (Adult Remix)" - 4:46
- UK vinyl, 12-inch single
1. "Emerge (Dave Clarke Remix)" - 6:48
2. "Emerge (Radio Slave Edit)" - 6:22
3. "Emerge (Original)" - 4:45
- U.S. CD, maxi single
1. "Emerge (Album Version)" - 4:48
2. "Emerge (Junkie XL Remix)" - 8:52
3. "Emerge (DFA Version)" - 4:17
4. "Emerge (Naughty's Chiefrocker Remix)" - 5:12

== Charts ==
Chart (2002/2003)	Peak Position
Belgium (Ultratip Bubbling Under Flanders)	18
UK Singles (The Official Charts Company)	25
US Dance Club Songs (Billboard)	18
