= Winter Spring Summer Fall =

Mixtape by Boots
- Released: May 6, 2014
- Recorded: 2013–2014
- Genre: R&B; hip hop
- Producer: Boots

Boots chronology
| Winter Spring Summer Fall (2014) | Motorcycle Jesus (2015) |

Professional ratings
Review scores
| Source | Rating |
|---|---|
| Pitchfork | 5.7/10 |

Winter Spring Summer Fall is the debut mixtape by American record producer, singer-songwriter, rapper and musician Boots.

== Background ==
Jordy Asher was a frontman of bands such as Blonds, Young Circles, Blond Fuzz and Stonefox. In June 2013, he was officially signed to Jay-Z's entertainment company and Sony Music Entertainment imprint, Roc Nation, under the pseudonym Boots, for publishing. In the same month, a fashion film (starring Chanel Iman and Viktoriya Sasonkina) featuring music by Boots was released.

With his contributions to Beyoncé released in December 2013, Boots came onto the music scene largely unknown. Upon the release of Beyoncé, he updated his Facebook page, saying he had been "working on [Beyoncé] for most of the past year", and that he had "produced 85% of [the album] and [had] four original songs on the album." Boots contributed additional production, background vocals and instruments to the album's first R&B/hip hop single, "Drunk in Love", featuring Jay-Z. Beyoncé later referenced Boots' work on the album, saying he is "a new producer that [she] completely respect[s]", that "he is an innovator", and she is "so proud to work with him".

== Promotion ==
Boots began releasing tracks for his mixtape in mid February. On February 13, 2014 Beyoncé's official Facebook page shared a link to Boots' personal website which contained an original composition titled "Dust" with an accompanying music video. The song was of the first to be released which featured Boots singing lead vocals.

On March 11, 2014 Boots released two more songs. One titled "Howl" as well as another titled "Autumn (Lude I)" which featured R&B artist Kelela. The release of "Autumn (Lude I)" included another music video, directed by Boots. "Autumn (Lude I)" featured Boots rapping instead of singing.

On March 25, 2014 Boots yet again released two songs. The first was a song titled "Ride Ride Ride" which reportedly featured background vocals from Sia. The second song titled "Alright", featured Boots prominently rapping. In the song, Boots mentions selling "1 million in one week", alluding to Beyoncé's album surpassing one-million digital sales in its first week.

On April 8, 2014 Boots released two more songs on his Facebook page. The first titled "Sheep/Lookin' Muthafucka (Lude II)" is a two part song. The first half hears Boots singing quietly over an electronic and orchestral arrangement. The second half features Boots rapping with a motif that plays heavily off of Nicki Minaj's "Lookin Ass". The second was a song titled "My Heart Is a Stone Today (Unharmed)"

== Release ==
On April 11, 2014 Boots uploaded a photo to his Twitter reportedly of a track-list. The track list contained all of the songs he had previously released. Prominent features listed were Shlohmo & Jeremih, Kelela as previously mentioned, Son Lux, Margot and a final feature that is unconfirmed. He later went on to announce that the track list was a mixtape titled "WinterSpringSummerFall" but did not confirm a release date.

== Track listing ==
All tracks are written by Boots.

| No. | Title | Length |
|---|---|---|
| 1. | "A Day in the Life of Jordan Asher" | 4:19 |
| 2. | "Dust" | 4:35 |
| 3. | "Howl / Your Move" | 4:13 |
| 4. | "Fade Away" | 3:40 |
| 5. | "Alright" | 4:09 |
| 6. | "No More (Snowed In)" (featuring Shlohmo & Jeremih) | 4:33 |
| 7. | "Autumn (Lude I)" (featuring Kelela) | 3:49 |
| 8. | "EST" | 3:29 |
| 9. | "Sheep / Lookin' Muthafucka (Lude II)" | 3:57 |
| 10. | "Troubled World" (featuring Son Lux) | 4:28 |
| 11. | "Olive Trees and Blue Skies and Hills" | 0:56 |
| 12. | "My Heart Is a Stone Today (Unharmed)" | 5:42 |
| 13. | "Atom" | 5:21 |
| 14. | "Ride By (Lude III)" (featuring Margot) | 1:07 |
| 15. | "Ride Ride Ride" (featuring Sia) | 4:30 |
| 16. | "Dreams" (featuring Beyoncé) | 4:54 |

== Personnel ==
- Boots – vocals, production

=== Additional musicians ===
- Shlohmo – (track 6)
- Jeremih – (track 6)
- Kelela – (track 7)
- Son Lux – (track 10)
- Margot – (track 14)
- Sia – vocals (track 15)
- Beyoncé – vocals (track 16)
