= Peggy Noland =

American fashion designer

- Born: Independence, Missouri, U.S.
- Education: Rockhurst University (Religious Studies)
- Occupations: Fashion designer, educator
- Years active: 2006–present
- Known for: Fashion designs with corporate logo motifs
- Label: Peggy Noland Kansas City
- Parent: Garry Noland (father)
- Website: peggynoland.com

Peggy Noland is an American fashion designer based in Kansas City, Missouri and Los Angeles, California. She has been a teacher in the Fiber Department at the Kansas City Art Institute since 2008.

== Biography ==
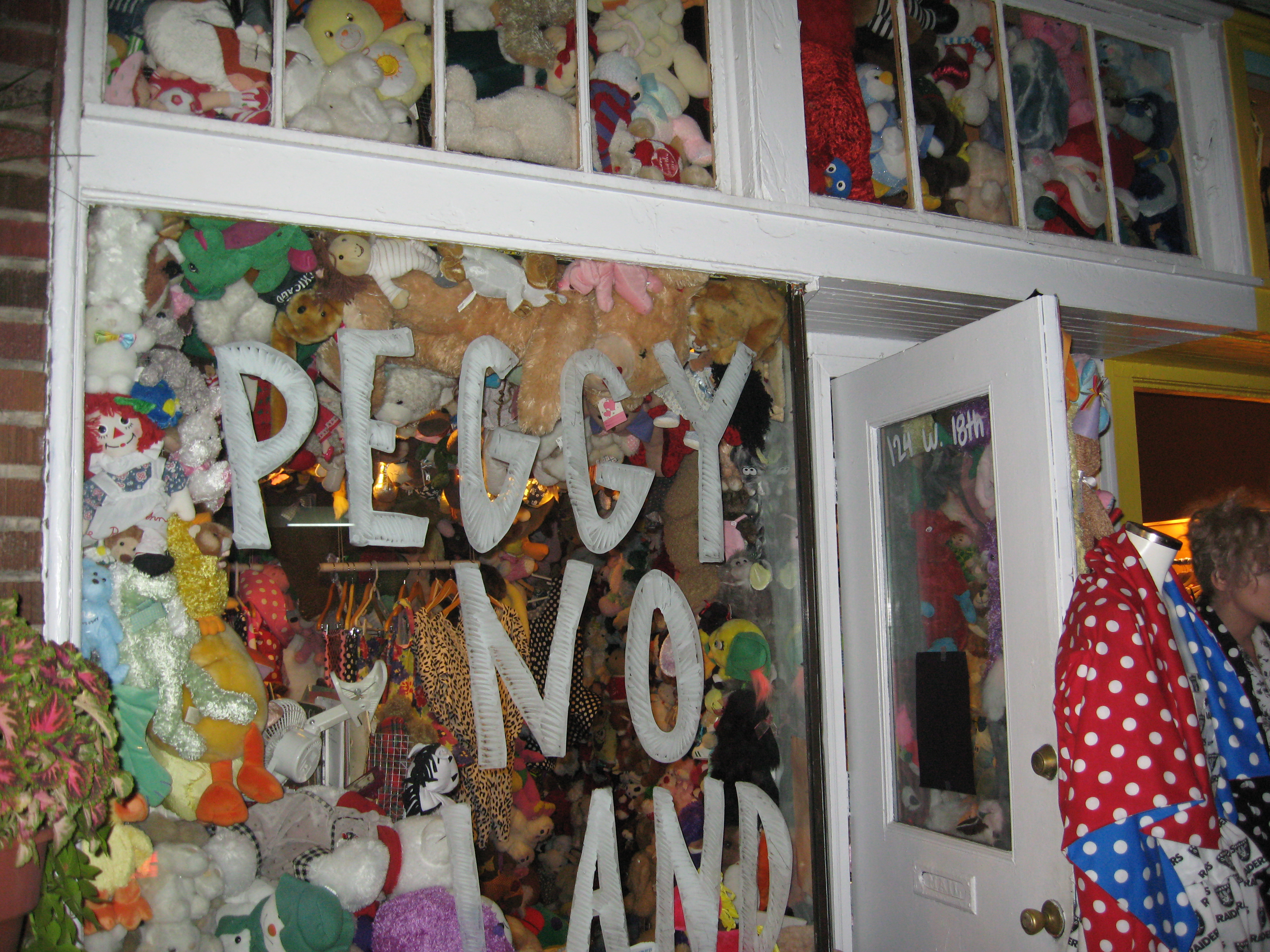
Shop front of Peggy Noland Kansas City

Noland is originally from Independence, Missouri. She is the daughter of artist Garry Noland. She majored in Religious Studies at Rockhurst University, then worked as a production manager for a New Delhi clothing company in 2006. On returning to Kansas City, at age 23, Noland opened a boutique in the Crossroads, Kansas City, called Peggy Noland Kansas City which has since closed as of 2018. Kansas City's The Pitch awarded her with their Design/Fashion MasterMind Award in 2006. In August 2009, Noland opened a second boutique for a month in Berlin, Germany with the help of the Kansas City Artists Coalition and a grant from the Lighton International Artist Exchange Program.

== Clothing label ==
The aesthetic of the Peggy Noland brand has been described as "white trash meets high class". Her aesthetic is commonly referred to as a mixed style of meth addicts from her hometown in Independence, Missouri combined with an eccentric, Parisian old-lady. She is notorious for taking corporate logos and morphing them into an art form of their own. Her belief in consumerism and branding has led to a "mix of LA pop art and KC gutter-punk".

Her work uses bright colors, full-body leotards and patterns. Her designs have been worn by several musicians, including Rihanna, Miley Cyrus, Lovefoxxx from Brazilian band CSS, Kianna Alarid from the Omaha, Nebraska band Tilly and the Wall, Fischerspooner, Chicks on Speed and The Ssion. Actress Alia Shawkat has also bought one of her works. In 2009, she worked with Bec Stupak.

Her work has appeared in fashion and music magazines including WWD, Elle, Elle Japan, Dazed and Confused, Vogue, British Vogue, Nylon, Nylon Japan, Spin, Rolling Stone, and Missbehave, as well as fashion blogs, like TeenVogue and StyleBubble. From 2015 to 2019, Noland owned a storefront in Echo Park that adorned such art installations as giant, green styrofoam hands and "cartoony body-building babe figures".

Noland's work frequently has been copied by fast-fashion retailers, a practice she has addressed through both activism and art. In 2016, she collaborated with artist Seth Bogart to create a temporary "Zara" installation inside their Wacky Wacko boutique in Los Angeles. The pop-up displayed actual knockoffs of their designs found online, repriced at inflated costs with proceeds donated to garment workers' rights organizations. Noland has noted the complex intellectual property questions her work raises, stating that her designs incorporating corporate logos create "rip-offs of rip-offs" when copied by the same companies whose imagery she references.

== Style ==
She is known for her distinctive hairstyles, which have changed over the years. Early in her career, the hair was shaved on top, while leaving the back and sides long. Before 2013, she had the sides and back shaved, wearing long hair on top. From 2013 until 2017, she only shaved the top bald, most times completely smooth with a razor.
