= The 15th =

1979 song by Wire

Song by Wire

from the album 154
- Released: September 1979
- Genre: Post-punk; art punk
- Length: 3:04
- Label: Harvest Records, pinkflag
- Songwriter: Colin Newman
- Producer: Mike Thorne

"The 15th" is a song from the 1979 album 154 by the English rock band Wire, written by Colin Newman.

== Covers ==
"The 15th"

Single by Fischerspooner

from the album #1
- Released: 2002
- Length: 3:59
- Label: International DeeJay Gigolo Records, FS Studios, Ministry of Sound, Capitol
- Songwriter: Colin Newman
- Producer: Fischerspooner

Fischerspooner singles chronology
| "Emerge" (2001) | "The 15th" (2002) | "L.A. Song" / "Sweetness" (2003) |

Music video
- "The 15th" on YouTube

The electroclash band Fischerspooner covered "The 15th" as the second single from its 2001 debut album #1. It was also covered by Jay Reatard's Angry Angles project.
