= Doorika =

Performance arts collective based in Chicago and New York City from 1990-1999

Doorika was a performance arts collective based in Chicago and New York City from 1990-1999. It was a collaborative group with a mix bag of visual artists, performers, non-actors and musicians who worked on developing multi-media theater projects. It was co-founded by John Dooley and Erika Yeomans in 1990. Some of the artists that contributed and worked on the shows were: Eric Koziol, Jon Langford, The Aluminum Group, Casey Spooner, Lisa Perry, Doug Huston, Amy Galper, Ford Wright, Marianne Potje, Deborah Shirley, William F. Wright, Tamara Wasserman, Jim Skish, Celia Bucci, Mot Filipowski, Magica Bottari, Ken Weaver, Amy Kerwin, Matthew Kopp, Kelly Kuvo, LIzzy Yoder, Robert Hungerford, Scott Leuthold (Beggar Weeds), Scott Fulmer, Ken Kobland, Jeremiah Clancy, Peter Redgrave, Carla Bruce-Lee among others.

Doorika made a benefit CD entitled DIG THIS in 1996 by Sweet Pea Records.

They performed at PS 122, Ontological-Hysteric Theater, Chopin Theater, CBGB's Gallery, Chicago Filmmakers, Ohio Theater's Ice Factory Series, Vineyard Theater, Bailiwick Repertory Theatre, St. Mark's Church in-the-Bowery, Downtown Theater Festival among other venues in New York and Chicago.

== Works ==
- In A Way It Was A Crisis
- Parlando
- North of the Lake
- Hardhead Flair (also exists as a short art film)
- Dear
- Throes
- Akogare No Pari (the Paris of Our Dreams)
- Bathe Me! Dr. Faustus Lights the Lights!
- The Forgery (also exists as experimental video and shot by video artist Ken Kobland of The Wooster Group).
