= Blonds (band) =

American indie pop duo

- Origin: West Palm Beach, Florida, Treasure Coast
- Genres: Pop, rock, indie, alternative
- Years active: 2011–2013
- Past members: Jordan Asher Cruz; Cari Rae

Blonds (often stylized as BLONDS) were an American indie pop duo formed in 2011 in Treasure Coast, Florida, consisting of Jordan Asher Cruz and Cari Rae.

Blonds released their debut album, The Bad Ones on August 7, 2012.

== Biography ==
Blonds first came to prominence when they released their Dark Roots EP in December 2011. The EP gained quite a few favorable reviews and earned Blonds the title of band to watch from Stereogum.

After the group broke up in 2013, Jordan would go on to be signed to Roc Nation under the pseudonym Boots.

== Discography ==
=== Studio albums ===
- The Bad Ones (August 7, 2012)

=== Extended plays ===
- Dark Roots EP (December 13, 2011)
