= Motorcycle Jesus =

EP by Boots
- Released: March 3, 2015
- Recorded: 2014–15
- Genre: Pop, rock
- Length: 22:24
- Label: Canvasback/ATL

Boots chronology
Winter Spring Summer Fall (2014)	Motorcycle Jesus (2015)	Aquaria (2015)

Professional ratings
Review scores
Source	Rating
Consequence of Sound	B

Motorcycle Jesus is the first extended play by Boots. It is the soundtrack to his thirty-minute short film, with the same name. Boots made the 5-song EP available to stream on March 2, 2015.

== Track listing ==
All tracks are written by Boots.

No.	Title	Length
1.	"Mercy"	4:25
2.	"I Run Roulette"	3:49
3.	"Suicide Games"	3:45
4.	"Only"	4:20
5.	"Teen Reader"	6:06
