= Sir (album) =

Studio album by Fischerspooner
- Released: February 16, 2018
- Recorded: 2015–17
- Length: 46:53
- Label: Ultra
- Producers: Michael Stipe; Boots

Fischerspooner chronology
Entertainment (2009)	Sir (2018)

Singles from Sir
- 1. "Have Fun Tonight" Released: August 4, 2017; 2. "Togetherness" Released: October 13, 2017; 3. "Butterscotch Goddam" Released: November 17, 2017; 4. "TopBrazil" Released: January 19, 2018

Sir is the fourth and final studio album by American electroclash duo Fischerspooner, and their first since 2009's Entertainment. It was released digitally on February 16, 2018, through Ultra Music. A limited run of 500 vinyl versions featuring an alternative artwork was released in conjunction with NAK in Germany.

== Critical reception ==
Professional ratings
Aggregate scores
Source	Rating
Metacritic	67/100
Review scores
Source	Rating
The A.V. Club	(B−)
Mixmag	8/10 stars
NME	3/5 stars
The Observer	2/5 stars
Pitchfork	5.8/10

The album has received a Metacritic score of 67 based on 11 critics, indicating generally favorable reviews.

== Track listing ==
Sir track listing
No.	Title	Writer(s)	Producer(s)	Length
1.	"Stranger Strange"	Warren Fischer; Casey Spooner; Jonathan "Michael" Stipe; Andy LeMaster; Caroline Polachek	Michael Stipe	3:44
2.	"TopBrazil"	Fischer; Stipe; Spooner; LeMaster; Michael Cheever; Jonathan Magee	Stipe	2:48
3.	"Togetherness" (featuring Caroline Polachek)	Fischer; Spooner; Stipe; Cheever; Polachek	Stipe	3:21
4.	"Everything Is Just Alright"	Fischer; Spooner; Stipe; LeMaster; Cheever; Jordan Asher	Stipe; Boots	2:51
5.	"Have Fun Tonight"	Fischer; Spooner; Stipe; LeMaster; Asher	Fischerspooner; Stipe^{[a]}; Boots^{[a]}	4:20
6.	"Discreet"	Fischer; Spooner; Stipe; Cheever; Polachek; Thomas Haskett	Stipe	4:08
7.	"Strut"	Fischer; Spooner; Stipe; LeMaster; Cheever; Juho Paalosmaa	Stipe	3:39
8.	"Get It On"	Fischer; Spooner; Stipe; LeMaster	Stipe	3:46
9.	"I Need Love"	Fischer; Spooner; Stipe; LeMaster; Asher	Stipe; Boots^{[a]}	2:58
10.	"Butterscotch Goddam" (featuring Johnny Magee)	Fischer; Stipe; Spooner; LeMaster; Magee	Stipe	3:37
11.	"Dark Pink"	Fischer; Spooner; Stipe; LeMaster; Cheever; Magee	Stipe	2:09
12.	"Try Again" (featuring Andy LeMaster)	Fischer; Spooner; Stipe; LeMaster	Stipe	4:08
13.	"Oh Rio" (featuring Holly Miranda)	Fischer; Spooner; Stipe; Magee	Stipe	5:24
Total length:				46:53

Notes

- ^{^[a]} signifies a co-producer.

== Charts ==
Chart (2018)	Peak position
US Heatseekers Albums (Billboard)	23
