= Entertainment (Fischerspooner album) =

Studio album by Fischerspooner
- Released: May 4, 2009
- Genre: Electropop
- Producer: Fischerspooner; Jeff Saltzman

Fischerspooner chronology
| Odyssey (2005) | Entertainment (2009) | Sir (2017) |

Singles from Entertainment
- 1. "We Are Electric"; 2. "Supply and Demand"

Professional ratings
Aggregate scores
| Source | Rating |
|---|---|
| Metacritic | 60/100 |
Review scores
| Source | Rating |
| Allmusic | 3/5 stars |
| musicOMH | |
| NME | 3/10 |
| Pitchfork | 5.8/10 |

Entertainment is the third studio album by electroclash duo and performance troupe Fischerspooner, released on May 5, 2009 in the United States, and on May 4 around the world. On April 19, 2009 a teaser for this album appeared on YouTube.

Written over a two-year period with producer Jeff Saltzman (The Killers, The Sounds) and recorded independently in a carriage house in Brooklyn with an intimate circle of artists working on the band's live show as Ian Pai, Ben Bromley and Sam Kearney. Other special guests include actress/performance artist Ann Magnuson, UK musician Gabriel Olegavich and electronic collagist Steven Stein.

The first single, "Supply & Demand" was made available as a free mp3 download from the band's website. The album's iTunes bonus track, "Fascinating" is a cover of an unreleased R.E.M. song originally composed for their 2001 album Reveal. Background vocals on "Supply & Demand" were sung by Heather Porcaro.

Entertainment received generally mixed reviews. The album holds a score of 60 out of 100 on the review aggregator website Metacritic.

== Track listing ==
| No. | Title | Length |
|---|---|---|
| 1. | "The Best Revenge" | 4:06 |
| 2. | "We Are Electric" | 4:34 |
| 3. | "Money Can't Dance" | 6:36 |
| 4. | "In a Modern World" | 4:29 |
| 5. | "Supply & Demand" | 4:31 |
| 6. | "Amuse Bouche" | 4:13 |
| 7. | "Infidels of the World Unite" | 5:22 |
| 8. | "Door Train Home" | 4:09 |
| 9. | "Danse en France" | 5:03 |
| 10. | "To the Moon" | 3:54 |
| 11. | "Fascinating" (iTunes Bonus Track - R.E.M. cover) | 4:16 |

== Charts ==
| Chart (2009) | Peak position |
|---|---|
| U.S. Top Electronic Albums | 7 |
| U.S. Top Heatseekers | 9 |
