= 1 (Fischerspooner album) =

#1

Studio album by Fischerspooner
- Released: November 26, 2001
- Genre: Electroclash
- Length: 65:54
- Labels: Capitol; International DeeJay Gigolo; Ministry of Sound
- Producers: Fischerspooner; Nicolas Vernhes

Fischerspooner chronology
#1 (2001)	Odyssey (2005)

Singles from #1
- 1. "Emerge" Released: August 2001; 2. "The 15th" Released: 2002; 3. "L.A. Song" / "Sweetness" Released: 2003

#1 is the first full-length album by electroclash duo Fischerspooner released in 2001. It originally received a limited run on International DeeJay Gigolo Records, and contained "The 15th", a cover of a Wire song from their album 154. #1 has been re-pressed several times with a different track listing. The title "Fucker" was also censored on subsequent releases, either as "!@*$%#", "*#!@¥¿", or "*#!@Y?".

"Sweetness", "L.A. Song" and "Megacolon", all from the re-issue were originally released together on an EP titled #1 Supplement that was discontinued in time for the first re-issue. A limited edition pressing from 2003 also included a DVD with several remixes, a documentary, as well as four videos—"Sweetness", "The 15th" and two versions of "Emerge".

"Emerge" was listed at number 243 on Pitchfork's Best Songs of the 2000s.

== Test-marketed DualDisc version ==
#1 was included among a group of 15 DualDisc releases that were test marketed in just two US cities: Boston and Seattle. The DualDisc version of the album is rare. It has the standard album on one side, and bonus material on the second side. The DualDisc release was never reissued after the very limited test market run.

== Reception ==
Professional ratings
Aggregate scores
Source	Rating
Metacritic	70/100
Review scores
Source	Rating
AllMusic	3.5/5 stars
Drowned in Sound	8/10
Pitchfork	3.1/10
PopMatters	positive
Rolling Stone	3/5 stars

#1 received mostly favorable reviews from critics. The album holds a score of 70 out of 100 on the review aggregator website Metacritic.

The record was placed at number 34 on Q magazine's 2006 list, "The 50 Worst Albums Ever!"

== Track listing ==
All tracks by Fischerspooner except where noted.

Original release
No.	Title	Length
1.	"Invisible"	5:13
2.	"The 15th" (Colin Newman)	3:58
3.	"Emerge"	4:48
4.	"Fucker"	4:54
5.	"Turn On"	4:24
6.	"Tone Poem"	4:14
7.	"Ersatz"	3:56
8.	"Horizon"	5:33
9.	"Natural Disaster"	4:46

Re-issue
No.	Title	Length
1.	"Sweetness"	5:22
2.	"The 15th"	3:58
3.	"Emerge"	4:48
4.	"L.A. Song"	4:10
5.	"Tone Poem"	4:14
6.	"Horizon"	5:33
7.	"Invisible"	5:13
8.	"Turn On"	4:24
9.	"!@*$%#"	4:54
10.	"Natural Disaster"	4:46
11.	"Ersatz"	3:56
12.	"Megacolon" (bonus track)	5:40
13.	"Emerge" (Junkie XL remix, bonus track)	8:51

== Personnel ==
- Bruce – wardrobe
- Jeffrey Deitch – design
- Angela DiCarlo – make-up
- Brett Douglas – photography
- Adam Dugas – vocals, photography, dramaturgist
- Roe Ethridge – photography
- Warren Fischer – composer
- Fischerspooner – producer
- Jeff Francis – hair stylist
- Agnieszka Gasparska – photography, web design
- Chris Gehringer – mastering
- Suzanne Geiss – project manager
- Gary Graham – wardrobe
- Cindy Greene – vocals, singer
- Lady Y Von La Force – vocals
- Mike Schmelling – photography
- Jeremy Scott – wardrobe
- Casey Spooner – vocals, lyricist
- Nicolas Vernhes – producer
- Lizzy Yoder – vocals, singer
- Zaldy – wardrobe
