= Odyssey (Fischerspooner album) =

Studio album by Fischerspooner
- Released: April 5, 2005
- Recorded: 2004–2005
- Genre: Electropop
- Length: 51:26
- Labels: EMI; Capitol
- Producers: Fischerspooner; Mirwais Ahmadzai; Nicolas Vernhes; Tony Hoffer; Victor Van Vugt; Adam Peters

Fischerspooner chronology
#1 (2002)	Odyssey (2005)	Entertainment (2009)

Singles from Odyssey
- 1. "Just Let Go" Released: 2005; 2. "Never Win" Released: July 20, 2005; 3. "A Kick in the Teeth/All We Are" Released: November 2005; 4. "We Need a War" Released: March 2006

Odyssey is the second full-length album by electroclash duo and performance troupe Fischerspooner, released on April 5, 2005, in the United States, and on April 11 around the world. Despite being recognized as one of the more successful acts from the electroclash scene, Fischerspooner changed their musical direction, and created Odyssey as more of a synthpop record. The album features several guest contributors such as David Byrne, Linda Perry, Hole's guitarist Eric Erlandson, Mirwais and Susan Sontag. The songs "Natural Disaster", "Never Win", and "Happy" were featured in the 2006 film Grandma's Boy, and the last two songs were included on the soundtrack.

== Critical reception ==
Professional ratings
Aggregate scores
Source	Rating
Metacritic	70/100
Review scores
Source	Rating
AllMusic	3.5/5 stars
The Guardian	3/5 stars
Pitchfork Media	(7.3/10)
PopMatters	7/10 stars
Rolling Stone	3/5 stars

Odyssey received generally favorable reviews. The album holds a score of 70 out of 100 on the review aggregator website Metacritic.

== Track listing ==
No.	Title	Writer(s)	Length
1.	"Just Let Go"	Warren Fischer, Casey Spooner	4:15
2.	"Cloud"	Fischer, Spooner, Eric Erlandson, John Wolfington	3:33
3.	"Never Win"	Fischer, Spooner, Kyle "Slick" Johnson	4:00
4.	"A Kick in the Teeth"	Fischer, Spooner, Linda Perry	4:21
5.	"Everything to Gain"	Fischer, Spooner, Nicolas Vernhes	4:13
6.	"We Need a War"	Fischer, Spooner, Jimmy Harry, Susan Sontag	3:41
7.	"Get Confused"	Fischer, Spooner, Johnson, David Byrne	4:11
8.	"Wednesday"	Fischer, Spooner	3:27
9.	"Happy"	Fischer, Spooner, Perry, Vernhes	4:01
10.	"Ritz 107"	Fischer, Spooner, Vernhes	4:36
11.	"All We Are"	Fischer, Spooner, Perry, Vernhes	4:41
12.	"◯" (Circle (Vision Creation New Sun); Boredoms cover)	Boredoms	6:35

US limited edition bonus track
No.	Title	Length
13.	"Down Up" (Featuring Lizzy Yoder)

UK first pressing, and US and Australian limited editions bonus track
No.	Title	Length
13.	"Just Let Go" (Thin White Duke remix)

Japan limited edition bonus track
No.	Title	Length
13.	"Never Win" (Mirwais alternate version)

== Charts ==
=== Album charts ===
Chart (2005)	Peak position
Belgian Albums Chart (Flanders)	95
Belgian Albums Chart (Wallonia)	65
French Albums Chart	121
UK Albums Chart	110
U.S. Billboard 200	172
U.S. Top Electronic Albums	2
U.S. Top Heatseekers	11

=== Singles ===
Single	Chart (2005)	Peak position
"Just Let Go"	UK Singles Chart	20
"Just Let Go"	U.S. Hot Dance Club Songs	7
"Never Win"	Belgian Dance Chart	11
"Never Win"	UK Singles Chart	55
"Never Win"	U.S. Hot Dance Club Songs	17
