= Fischerspooner =

American electroclash duo

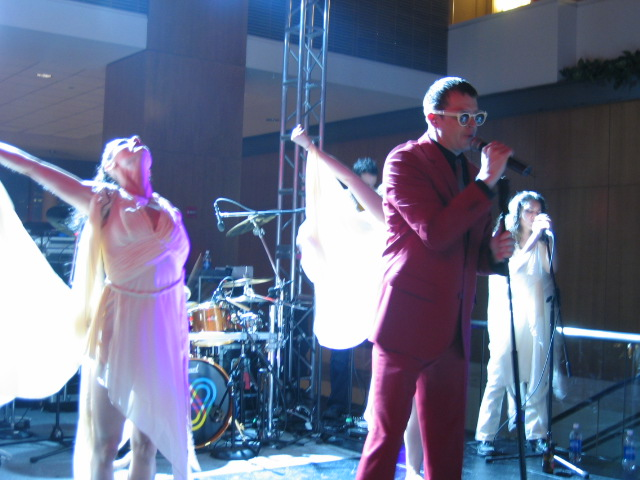

Background information
- Origin: New York City, U.S.
- Genre: Electroclash
- Years active: 1998–2019
- Labels: Ministry of Sound, Dim Mak Records, Capitol Records, Kitsuné Musique, International Deejay Gigolo Records
- Past members: Warren Fischer; Casey Spooner
- Website: fischerspooner.com

Fischerspooner was an electroclash duo and performance troupe formed in 1998 in New York City after meeting in school. The name is a combination of the last names of the founders, Warren Fischer and Casey Spooner.

== Career ==
Originally a duo formed by classically trained musician Warren Fischer and video-artist and experimental theater performer Casey Spooner for an impromptu rendition of their makeshift track "Indian Cab Driver" at the Astor Place Starbucks, the group grew to over 20 performers, most of whom were dancers and guest vocalists. "We started as a performance art piece about entertainment that ultimately became legitimate entertainment," said Casey Spooner, when talking about the group's origins in an April 2009 interview. In September 2000, The Village Voice critic Jerry Saltz described Fischerspooner as a "performance/art/music group" and cited its five-day run of performances that year as an example of new work emerging in contemporary art, comparing its members to Laurie Anderson. Musical influences included Gary Numan, New Order and Orchestral Manoeuvres in the Dark.

=== #1 (2001) ===
Their debut album, #1, has been released on several record labels, including International DJ Gigolo, Ministry of Sound and Capitol Records, and includes their singles "Sweetness", "Emerge", and a cover of Wire's "the 15th". In the final months of 2004, Fischerspooner opened up their FS Studios in New York City to the public for a few hours once a week, allowing people to meet the band and production team, as well as preview new video, music and dance projects that they were working on.

=== Odyssey (2005) ===
In 2005, Odyssey, the band's second album, was released. The album featured songs that were more structured and more accurately described as electropop than electroclash. "Odyssey was really about being on Capitol, which was this icon of classic American music, trying to embrace that cliché and find a way to embody it and infiltrate it and take it apart at the same time", says Spooner.

The lead single, "Just Let Go", featuring live drums and guitars, possessed a markedly different sound than those heard on their debut album. "Just Let Go" was featured on season 2, episode 15 of Nip/Tuck; "All We Are" was also featured on the same TV series, in season 3, episode 1. The second single, "Never Win", went on to become the album's biggest hit, and was well received in both clubs and radio. Furthermore, it was also featured in the 2006 Happy Madison movie Grandma's Boy. "A Kick in the Teeth" was rumored to be the album's third, and possibly final, single but was only pressed on 12" that included a remix by Tiefschwarz. This was followed after a duration of silence by a 12" remix of "We Need a War" with a mix by DJ Hell. Other remixes believed to have been done are of "All We Are" and "Get Confused". "All We Are" was featured as the credits track in the first episode of season two of Sweetbitter.

After the album's release, Fischerspooner toured a new, more elaborate show in Europe, but the band found themselves without the funds to tour the show fully in North America. "I was incredibly frustrated because I had worked two years on this huge record and I was only able to perform for three months", recalls Spooner, who subsequently retreated to his theatrical roots, joining experimental New York performance ensemble The Wooster Group. During this period, it was unclear whether the band would record together again; and, in May 2007, the band was released from its Capitol Records recording contract.

=== Entertainment (2009) ===
Early European gig recordings of "The Best Revenge" surfaced on the internet during summer 2007. "The Best Revenge" was released on January 14, 2008, with French label Kitsuné Musique. The track includes a remix package from the likes of Autokratz, Tocadisco, Alex Gopher, The Passions and Tony Senghore. Fischerspooner also released "Danse en France" as a single on the Kitsuné label. The album 'Entertainment' was released by Lo Recordings.

Warren and Casey subsequently began to work on more material for a new album while Casey was performing the role of Ophelia's brother Laertes in The Wooster Group's production of Hamlet (Fischerspooner also contributed two original songs to the production). Released in North America via the band's own label FS Studios on May 4, 2009, Entertainment is their third full-length album and was produced by Jeff Saltzman (The Killers, The Black Keys, The Sounds).

The album's cover was listed on Pitchfork's worst album covers of 2009.

=== Sir (2018) ===
The album Sir, executive-produced and co-written by Michael Stipe of R.E.M. and Boots, was released on February 16, 2018, on Ultra. The band released the first single "Have Fun Tonight" on June 19, 2017. The song "Top Brazil" was released on January 19, 2018; along with an electro-pop music video which Billboard called, "provocative." NPR interpreted the album as a retrospective collage of Reagan-era queer references framed in an undeniably contemporary style: "Even the cheapskate metaphor passions in the lyrics, read as physical, often NSFW desires — 'raging motorcycle thoroughbred,' 'not opposed to humiliation,' 'denim on denim,' 'dorsal fins at night in Berlin,' 'Butterscotch Goddam,' 'dark pink Saturday night' — that are dated just enough to seem older and odder. Pairing these with layered synthesizer lines and drum-machines that invoke Reagan-era industrial and EBM reinforces nostalgic notions of sexual danger."

In an interview with the album collaborators, it was said that, "[the album] explores Spooner’s 're-entry into the sexual playground now defined by technology, but also the muddled ways that feelings and self-image are present in that experience' while simultaneously examining the years of 'emotional and sexual turbulence' he experienced with his ex-partner."

=== Break-up ===
On October 30, 2019, the duo announced their breakup via Instagram.

== Awards and nominations ==
Award	Year	Nominee(s)	Category	Result	Ref.
International Dance Music Awards	2003	Fischerspooner	Best New Dance Artist - Solo	Nominated	
International Dance Music Awards	2003	"Emerge"	Best Dance Video	Nominated	

== Band members ==
- Warren Fischer – composer
- Casey Spooner – songwriter, vocals
- Sam Kearney – guitar
- Peanuts, aka Jeremiah Clancy – attendant to Casey, actor
- Adam Crystal – keyboards
- Cindy Greene – vocals
- Lizzy Yoder – vocals
- Ian Pai – musical director, drums
- Vanessa Walters – choreographer, dancer
- Stephanie Dixon – dancer

== Discography ==
=== Albums ===
- Bootleg (self-titled, with PS1 Cover Artwork) (1998)
- Fischerspooner (2000) – "For Those Who Know" release
- #1 or Best Album Ever, originally titled Best Album Ever, "International DJ Gigolos" release in 2001, Ministry of Sound release in 2002, Capitol Records reissue with DVD in 2003 - UK #92
- Odyssey (2005) US #172, UK #110
- Entertainment (2009)
- Sir (2018)

=== Singles ===
Year	Title	Peak chart positions			Album
Year	Title	US Dance	GRE	UK	Album
2001	"Emerge"	—	127	—	#1 or Best Album Ever
2002	"Emerge" (re-release)	18	25	25	#1 or Best Album Ever
2002	"The 15th"	21	—	—	#1 or Best Album Ever
2003	"L.A. Song" / "Sweetness"	—	—	—	#1 or Best Album Ever
2005	"Just Let Go"	7	—	27	Odyssey
2005	"Never Win"	17	55	—	Odyssey
2005	"A Kick in the Teeth" / "All We Are"	—	—	—	Odyssey
2006	"We Need a War"	—	—	—	Odyssey
2008	"The Best Revenge"	—	—	—	Entertainment
2008	"Danse En France"	—	—	—	Entertainment
2009	"Supply & Demand"	—	—	—	Entertainment
2009	"We Are Electric"	—	—	—	Entertainment
2011	"Infidels of the World Unite"	—	—	—	Entertainment
2017	"Have Fun Tonight"	—	—	—	Sir
2018	"TopBrazil"	—	—	—	Sir

=== Music videos ===
- "Emerge" – Original version (2001)
- "Emerge" – Skin version (2003)
- "The 15th" (2003)
- "Sweetness" (2003)
- "Just Let Go" (2005)
- "Never Win" (2005)
- "Never Win" – Mirwais version (2005)
- "All We Are" (made for a Coca-Cola project by Rex & Tennant) (2006)
- "Get Confused" (2008)
- "We Are Electric" (2009)
- "The Best Revenge" (2011)
- "Have Fun Tonight" (2017)
- "Togetherness" (2017)
- "TopBrazil" (2017)
