= Boots (musician) =

American singer

BOOTS
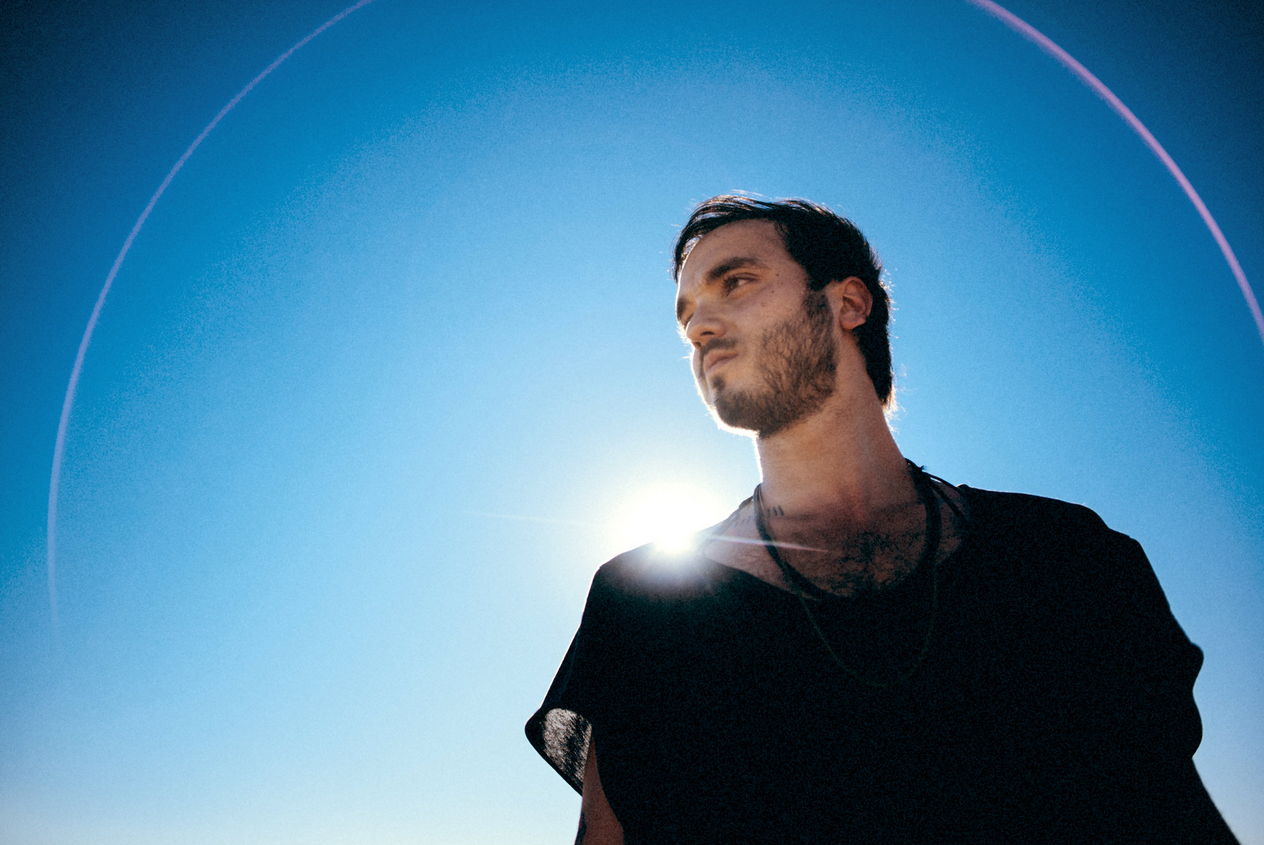
- BOOTS in 2015

Background information
- Born: Jordan Asher Cruz
- Genres: Rock; folk; alternative R&B; experimental hip hop; alternative rock
- Occupations: Record producer; director; singer; songwriter; rapper; filmmaker
- Instruments: Vocals; piano; keyboards; guitar; drums; bass guitar; synthesizer; percussion
- Years active: 2011–present
- Labels: Columbia; Roc Nation; Atlantic
- Spouse: Jennifer Goodridge Cruz (m. 2022)
- Children: 1

Jordan Asher Cruz, known professionally as Boots (stylized as BOOTS), is an American record producer, singer, songwriter, director, and animator. He is best known for his production and songwriting contributions to Beyoncé's self-titled fifth studio album (2013). For his work on the album and its follow-up, Lemonade (2016), he earned two Grammy Award nominations for Album of the Year.

== Career ==
=== Early career and Beyoncé ===
Jordan Asher Cruz was a member of bands such as Young Circles, Blonds and Stonefox. In June 2013, he was officially signed to rapper Jay-Z's entertainment company and Sony Music Entertainment imprint, Roc Nation, under the pseudonym Boots, for publishing. In the same month, a fashion film (starring Chanel Iman and Viktoriya Sasonkina) featuring music by Boots was released.

With his contributions to Beyoncé's self-titled fifth studio album, released in December 2013, Boots came onto the music scene largely unknown. Upon the release of Beyoncé, he updated his Facebook page, saying he had been "working on [Beyoncé] for most of the past year", and that he had "produced 85% of [the album] and [had] four original songs on the album". Boots contributed additional production, background vocals and instruments to the album's first R&B/hip hop single, "Drunk in Love", featuring Jay-Z. Beyoncé later referenced Boots' work on the album, saying he is "a new producer that [she] completely respect[s]", that "he is an innovator", and she is "so proud to work with him".

In an interview with The New York Times, Boots would not speak of his previous projects or how Beyoncé found his demo, only confirming he signed a publishing deal with Roc Nation in June 2013. A last-ditch bout of songwriting yielded “I'm On To You”, a moody minor-key song with layers of eerie background voices and a particular rhythmic undertow. He saw it as a template for a solo album. “That song was my heart,” he said. At his first meeting with Beyoncé, he had already written songs he believed would resonate with her, but she was more enthused by his experimental material. Beyoncé refused to leave the song alone, saying to Boots, "This shit has to knock harder than any rap album out there." The song became "Haunted", and the previous title "I'm On To You" was instead recorded as a phrase in the song's refrain.

Following an infuriating meeting with a record label, Boots wrote the stream of consciousness rap from "Ghost" and played it for Beyoncé in the early stages of recording. She identified with its content as she had similar experiences from signing a recording contract at a young age. Boots made the song in a hypnotic state, saying, "I started with guitars, just building the layers until they resembled Aphex Twin soundscapes. And then I completely contained them within the beat".

=== Solo releases ===
On February 13, 2014 Beyoncé's official Facebook page shared a link to Boots' personal website which contained an original composition titled "Dust" with an accompanying music video. The song was of the first to be released which featured Boots singing lead vocals.

On April 11, 2014 Boots uploaded a photo to his Twitter reportedly of a track list. The track list contained all of the songs he had previously released. Prominent features listed were Shlohmo & Jeremih, Kelela as previously mentioned, Son Lux, Margot and a final feature that is unconfirmed. He later went on to announce that the track list was a mixtape titled "WinterSpringSummerFall" but did not confirm a release date. In July 2014, Boots scored the trailer of 2015 film Fifty Shades of Grey using a slowed-down version of "Crazy in Love" by Beyoncé who re-recorded the song and string arrangements by Margot. On September 8, 2014, he released his first single, "Mercy", on his SoundCloud account and on iTunes. On September 11, 2014, he released a video for "Mercy", directed by himself On October 31, 2014, Boots performed "Early" with Run The Jewels on the Late Show with David Letterman. On November 6, Boots released the new song "I Run Roulette.".

=== Motorcycle Jesus and AQUΛRIA ===
On February 19, 2015 Nowness premiered a trailer for a post-apocalyptic film titled Motorcycle Jesus, which was written and directed by Boots, which featured five original songs. In an exclusive feature story with Jon Pareles for The New York Times it was revealed that Boots would be releasing a solo album "later this year". The interview also revealed that Boots had produced unreleased albums for British singer FKA Twigs and Autolux. On March 18, 2015, Boots performed "I Run Roulette" on The Tonight Show Starring Jimmy Fallon. The performance—which featured Boots, two drummers, and a light show—garnered rave reviews from critics. On November 10, 2015, Adult Swim & Toonami premiered the animated video for Boots' single "C.U.R.E.". Boots would go on to perform "C.U.R.E." on The Late Show With Stephen Colbert.

=== 13Lux Films ===
In early 2017, Cruz started production on animated series, where he serves as creator, director, writer, animator, and show runner.

Cruz would subsequently go on to write and develop more film and television projects with his production company, 13Lux Films. In 2021, Cruz wrote, directed and produced along with Jennifer Goodridge Cruz, animated short film "No Future Here" which premiered at HollyShorts Film Festival on September 24, 2021 in Los Angeles, CA at the Grauman's Chinese Theatre. "No Future Here" features voices by Cleopatra Coleman of The Last Man on Earth, Frankie Loyal of Mayans M.C. and Justin Warfield of She Wants Revenge. "No Future Here" was also an official selection at Sidewalk Film Festival in Birmingham, Alabama and New York Shorts International Film Festival at Village East Cinema in New York City. The short would go on to win Best Animation at the 2022 Bowery Film Festival.

== Discography ==
=== Studio albums ===
| Title | Album details | Peak chart positions |
| Title | Album details | US Heat. |
|---|---|---|
| Aquaria | Released: November 13, 2015; Label: Columbia | 14 |

=== Extended plays ===
| Title | Album details |
|---|---|
| Motorcycle Jesus | Released: February 13, 2015; Label: Canvasback/ATL |
| #DARKDAZE | Released: February 13, 2018; Label: Self-released |

=== Mixtapes ===
| Title | Album details |
|---|---|
| Winter Spring Summer Fall | Released: May 6, 2014; Label: Self-released |

=== Guest appearances ===
- 2014: "Early" (with Run the Jewels) on Run the Jewels 2
- 2017: "2100" (with Run the Jewels) on Run the Jewels 3

== Songwriting, production, and miscellaneous credits ==
| Title | Year | Artist(s) | Album | Credits | Written with | Produced with |
|---|---|---|---|---|---|---|
| "Haunted" | 2013 | Beyoncé | Beyoncé | Co-writer/Producer | Beyoncé Knowles-Carter | Beyoncé |
| "Drunk in Love" (featuring Jay-Z) | 2013 | Beyoncé | Beyoncé | Additional producer | - | Detail, The Order, Beyoncé, Timbaland, Jerome Harmon |
| "No Angel" | 2013 | Beyoncé | Beyoncé | Additional producer | - | Caroline Polachek, Beyoncé, Patrick Wimberly, James Fauntleroy |
| "Partition" | 2013 | Beyoncé | Beyoncé | Additional producer | - | Timbaland, Jerome Harmon, Justin Timberlake, Beyoncé, Key Wane, Mike Dean |
| "Jealous" | 2013 | Beyoncé | Beyoncé | Co-writer/Producer | Lyrica Anderson, Noel Fisher, Beyoncé Knowles-Carter, Eric Proctor, Rasool Diaz, Brian Soko | Detail, The Order, Beyoncé, Hit-Boy, HazeBanga |
| "Flawless" (featuring Chimamanda Ngozi Adichie) | 2013 | Beyoncé | Beyoncé | Additional Producer | - | Hit-Boy, Beyoncé, Rey Reel Music, HazeBanga |
| "Superpower" (featuring Frank Ocean) | 2013 | Beyoncé | Beyoncé | Additional Producer | - | Pharrell Williams |
| "Heaven" | 2013 | Beyoncé | Beyoncé | Co-writer/Producer | Beyoncé Knowles-Carter | Beyoncé |
| "Blue" (featuring Blue Ivy) | 2013 | Beyoncé | Beyoncé | Co-writer/Producer | Beyoncé Knowles-Carter | Beyoncé |
| "Lie, Cheat Steal" | 2014 | Run the Jewels | Run the Jewels 2 | Additional producer | - | EI-P, Little Shalimar |
| "Early" (featuring Boots) | 2014 | Run the Jewels | Run the Jewels 2 | Featured artist/Co-writer | Jaime Meline, Michael Render | - |
| "A Message" | 2015 | Kelela | Hallucinogen EP | Co-writer | Kelela Mizanekristos, Alejandra Ghersi, Dominic Salole | - |
| "Glass & Patron" | 2015 | FKA twigs | M3LL155X | Co-writer/Producer | Tahliah Barnett | FKA twigs |
| "Figure 8" | 2015 | FKA twigs | M3LL155X | Co-writer/Producer | Tahliah Barnett | FKA twigs |
| "I'm Your Doll" | 2015 | FKA twigs | M3LL155X | Producer | - | FKA twigs |
| "Mothercreep" | 2015 | FKA twigs | M3LL155X | Co-writer/Producer | Tahliah Barnett | FKA twigs |
| "SelectAllCopy" | 2016 | Autolux | Pussy's Dead | Co-writer/Producer | Carla Azar, Greg Edwards, Eugene Goreshter | - |
| "Soft Scene" | 2016 | Autolux | Pussy's Dead | Producer | - | - |
| "Hamster Suite" | 2016 | Autolux | Pussy's Dead | Co-writer/Producer | Carla Azar, Greg Edwards, Eugene Goreshter | - |
| "Junk for Code" | 2016 | Autolux | Pussy's Dead | Co-writer/Producer | Carla Azar, Greg Edwards, Eugene Goreshter | - |
| "Anonymous" | 2016 | Autolux | Pussy's Dead | Co-writer/Producer | Carla Azar, Greg Edwards, Eugene Goreshter | - |
| "Brainwasher" | 2016 | Autolux | Pussy's Dead | Producer | - | - |
| "Listen to The Order" | 2016 | Autolux | Pussy's Dead | Producer | - | - |
| "Reappearing" | 2016 | Autolux | Pussy's Dead | Producer | - | - |
| "Change My Head" | 2016 | Autolux | Pussy's Dead | Producer | - | - |
| "Becker" | 2016 | Autolux | Pussy's Dead | Producer | - | - |
| "6 Inch" (featuring The Weeknd) | 2016 | Beyoncé | Lemonade | Co-writer/Producer | Abel Tesfaye, Beyoncé Knowles-Carter, Danny Schofield, Benjamin Diehl, Terius Nash, Ahmad Balshe, Dave Portner, Noah Lennox, Brian Weitz, Burt Bacharach, Hal David | DannyBoyStyles, Ben Billions, Beyoncé, Derek Dixie |
| "Freedom" (featuring Kendrick Lamar) | 2016 | Beyoncé | Lemonade | Additional Programming | | Just Blaze, Jonny Coffer, Beyoncé, Myles William |
| "Sandcastles" | 2016 | Beyoncé | Lemonade | Synth Arrangement | | |
| "Never Gonna Love Again" (Unreleased) | 2016 | Beyoncé | Lemonade | Co-Writer/Co-Producer | | |
| 'And All Alone" (Unreleased) | 2016 | Beyoncé | Lemonade | Co-Writer/Co-Producer | | |
| "Thieves! (Screamed The Ghost)" (featuring Tunde Adebimpe) | 2016 | Run the Jewels | Run the Jewels 3 | Co-writer | Jaime Meline, Michael Render | - |
| "2100" (featuring Boots) | 2016 | Run the Jewels | Run the Jewels 3 | Featured artist/Co-writer | Jamie Meline, Michael Render | - |
| "Panther Like A Panther (Miracle Mix)" (featuring Trina) | 2016 | Run the Jewels | Run the Jewels 3 | Co-producer | - | EI-P, Little Shalimar, Wilder Zoby |
| "Didn't I (Say I Didn't)" | 2017 | Vic Mensa | The Autobiography | Co-writer | Victor Mensah, Alexander Baez, Darian Garcia, Carter Lang, Ernest Wilson, Malik Jones, William Pulliam, Jonathan Tanner, Tyrone Griffin Jr. | - |
| "Have Fun Tonight" | 2017 | Fischerspooner | SIR | Co-writer/Co-producer | Warren Fischer, Casey Spooner, Jonathan "Michael" Stipe, Andy LeMaster | Fischerspooner, Michael Stipe |
| "Take Me Apart" | 2017 | Kelela | Take Me Apart | Co-writer | Kelela Mizanekristos, Dominic Salole, Alexander Shukburgh | - |
| "Everything Is Just Alright" | 2018 | Fischerspooner | SIR | Co-writer/Producer | Warren Fischer, Casey Spooner, Jonathan "Michael" Stipe, Andy LeMaster, Michael Cheever | Michael Stipe |
| "I Need Love" | 2018 | Fischerspooner | SIR | Co-writer/Co-producer | Warren Fischer, Casey Spooner, Jonathan "Michael" Stipe, Andy LeMaster | Michael Stipe |
| "Dear God" | 2020 | Phantogram | Ceremony | Co-writer/Producer | Sarah Barthel, Josh Carter, Dana Travis Middleton, Jeffrey V. Smith | Andrew Dawson, Sarah Barthel, Josh Carter |
| "In A Spiral" | 2020 | Phantogram | Ceremony | Co-writer/Producer | Sarah Barthel, Josh Carter, Amanda Lucille Warner, Asa Taccone, Ennio Morricone, Joe Janiak, Peter Wade Keusch | Andrew Dawson, Sarah Barthel, Josh Carter, Derek Dunivan |
| "Into Happiness" | 2020 | Phantogram | Ceremony | Co-writer/Producer | Sarah Barthel, Josh Carter, William Corgan | Andrew Dawson, Sarah Barthel, Josh Carter |
| "Pedestal" | 2020 | Phantogram | Ceremony | Co-writer/Producer | Sarah Barthel, Josh Carter, Amanda Lucille Warner | Andrew Dawson, Sarah Barthel, Josh Carter |
| "Love Me Now" | 2020 | Phantogram | Ceremony | Co-writer/Producer | Sarah Barthel, Josh Carter, Dan Wilson, Henry Brill, Thom Bell, William Hart, William Corgan | Andrew Dawson, Sarah Barthel, Josh Carter |
| "Let Me Down" | 2020 | Phantogram | Ceremony | Co-writer/Producer | Sarah Barthel, Josh Carter, George Young, Harry Vanda | Andrew Dawson, Sarah Barthel, Josh Carter, Matt Jacobson |
| "News Today" | 2020 | Phantogram | Ceremony | Co-writer/Producer | Sarah Barthel, Josh Carter, Adrian Younge, Ali Shaheed Muhammad, Karolina Acratz, Loren Oden | Josh Carter |
| "Mister Impossible" | 2020 | Phantogram | Ceremony | Co-writer/Producer | Sarah Barthel, Josh Carter, John Scott, Terrance Cole | Andrew Dawson, Sarah Barthel, Josh Carter |
| "Glowing" | 2020 | Phantogram | Ceremony | Co-writer/Producer | Sarah Barthel, Josh Carter, Dan Wilson, Ólafur Arnalds | Andrew Dawson, Sarah Barthel, Josh Carter |
| "Gaunt Kids" | 2020 | Phantogram | Ceremony | Co-writer/Producer | Sarah Barthel, Josh Carter, Terius Youngdell Nash | Andrew Dawson, Sarah Barthel, Josh Carter |
| "Ceremony" | 2020 | Phantogram | Ceremony | Co-writer/Producer | Sarah Barthel, Josh Carter, Morgan Kibby | Andrew Dawson, Josh Carter |
| "Holy Calamafuck" | 2020 | Run The Jewels | RTJ4 | Co-writer/Producer | Jaime Meline, Michael Render, Dave Sitek, Little Shalimar, Wilder Zoby | El-P, Sitek, Little Shalimar, Wilder Zoby |
| "Pulling The Pin" (Featuring Mavis Staples & Josh Homme) | 2020 | Run The Jewels | RTJ4 | Co-writer/Producer | Jaime Meline, Michael Render, Josh Homme, Little Shalimar, Wilder Zoby | El-P, Little Shalimar, Wilder Zoby, Homme |
| "Secrets" | 2020 | Raye & Regard | Secrets | Co-writer | Raye, Regard, John Hill, Kennedi Lykken, Stephen Feigenbaum | Regard, John Lennox, John Hill |
| "Cry At The Moon" | 2025 | Bradley Simpson | The Panic Years | Co-writer/Producer | Bradley Simpson, Anthony Rossomando, Andrew Wells | |
| "Picasso" | 2025 | Bradley Simpson | The Panic Years | Co-writer/Producer | Bradley Simpson, Ina Wroldsen, Jonny Coffer | |
| "Carpet Burn" | 2025 | Bradley Simpson | The Panic Years | Co-writer/Producer | Bradley Simpson | |
| "Daisies" | 2025 | Bradley Simpson | The Panic Years | Co-writer/Producer | Bradley Simpson | |
| "Holy Grail" | 2025 | Bradley Simpson | The Panic Years | Co-writer/Producer | Bradley Simpson, Ina Wroldsen | |
| "Getting Clear" | 2025 | Bradley Simpson | The Panic Years | Co-writer/Producer | Bradley Simpson, Andrew Wells | |
| "Not Us Anymore" | 2025 | Bradley Simpson | The Panic Years | Co-writer/Producer | Bradley Simpson, Connor McDonough, Riley McDonough & Ryan Daly | |
| "Almost" | 2025 | Bradley Simpson | The Panic Years | Co-writer/Producer | Bradley Simpson | |
| "Favourite Band" | 2025 | Bradley Simpson | The Panic Years | Co-writer/Producer | Bradley Simpson | |
| "Always Like This" | 2025 | Bradley Simpson | The Panic Years | Co-writer/Producer | Bradley Simpson, Andrew Wells | |
| "The Band's Not Breaking Up" | 2025 | Bradley Simpson | The Panic Years | Co-writer/Producer | Bradley Simpson | |
| "The Panic Years" | 2025 | Bradley Simpson | The Panic Years | Co-writer/Producer | Bradley Simpson, Andrew Wells | |
| "Wild and Alone" (Featuring PinkPantheress) | 2025 | FKA Twigs | Eusexua Afterglow | Co-writer | Tahliah Barnett, Rick Nowels, Victoria Beverley Walker | - |

== Awards and nominations ==
=== Grammy Awards ===
| Year | Nominated Work | Category | Result | Ref |
|---|---|---|---|---|
| 2014 | Beyoncé | Album of the Year | Nominated | |
| 2017 | Lemonade | Album of the Year | Nominated | |
