= Vad =

Vad may refer to:

== Geography ==
=== Romania ===
- Vad, Cluj, a commune in Cluj County
- Vad (Hungarian: Vád), a village in Șercaia Commune, Brașov County
- Vad, a village in Copalnic-Mănăștur Commune, Maramureș County
- Vad, a village in Dragomirești Commune, Neamț County
- Vadu (Vád), a village in Sântămăria-Orlea Commune, Hunedoara County
- Vaduri, a village in Alexandru cel Bun Commune, Neamț County
- Vadurile, a village in Iana Commune, Vaslui County
- Vad (Olt), a tributary of the Olt
- Vad (Someș), a tributary of the Someș
- Vad, alternative name for the river Ocolișel, tributary of the Arieș

=== Other ===
- Vad, Russia, name of several rural localities in Russia
- Vad (Moksha), a river in Russia, tributary of the river Moksha
- Vad, Dalarna, Sweden
- Vaud, (by Romansh name) a canton in Switzerland

== People ==
- Frederik Vad (born 1994), Danish politician
- István Vad (born 1979), Hungarian football referee
- Katalin Vad (born 1980), Hungarian actress
- Ninetta Vad (born 1989), Hungarian sprint canoer
- Poul Vad (1927–2003), Danish writer and art historian

== Other ==
- VadPress, an imprint of the German group VDM Publishing devoted to the reproduction of Wikipedia content

== See also ==
- VAD (disambiguation)
- Vadu (disambiguation)
