= J'en ai marre =

J'en ai marre may refer to:

== Songs ==
- J'en ai marre!, Alizée
- "J'en ai marre", song by Arletty A. Willemetz, G. Arnould, M. Yvain 1956 covered by Colette Ritz 1967
- "J'en ai marre", song by Eddie Constantine Y. Samuel, J. Davis 1959
- "J'en ai marre", single by Johnny Hallyday Eric Bamy, Michel Mallory from Pas Facile 1981
- "J'en ai marre", song by Patrick Bruel
- "J'en ai marre", song by Adam Cohen
- "J'en ai marre", song by Mistinguett
- "J'en ai marre", song by Najat Aatabou
- "J'en ai marre", song by Sarane Ferret
- "J'en ai marre", song by Awilo Longomba
- "J'en ai marre", song by Sarcloret
- "J'en ai Marre", song by Hugues Le Bars used in ice-dance routine of Gwendal Peizerat and Marina Anissina
