= The Wanderings of the Avener =

Studio album by The Avener
- Released: 19 January 2015
- Genre: Electronic, deep house, indietronica
- Length: 103.58
- Label: Capitol

Singles from The Wanderings of the Avener
- 1. "Fade Out Lines" Released: 26 September 2014; 2. "Hate Street Dialogue" Released: 2014; 3. "To Let Myself Go" Released: 2015; 4. "Panama" Released: 2015; 5. "Castle in the Snow" Released: 2015

The Wanderings of the Avener is the debut studio album by French deep house and electro music producer The Avener. It was released in France on 19 January 2015 and peaked at No. 2.

== Reviews ==
Jonty Czuchwicki from TheMusic.com.au gave the album 3 out of 5, saying; "This album is a lesson in smooth and laid-back instrumental house music. There are wobbly keyboard lines, twangy guitar licks and plenty of well-placed bass lines that'll have your foot tapping. The jazz-soul-meets-electro is a naturalistic fusion and the atmosphere is always thick enough to cut with a knife, enticing with an air of mystery and intrigue."

== Track listing ==
No.	Title	Writer(s)	Artist(s)	Length
1.	"Panama"	William Bell / Tristan Casara / Booker T. Jones	feat. Savages, You are my chocolate (Melting Records)	4:35
2.	"Fade Out Lines"	Cédric Roux / Craig John Walker	featuring Phoebe Killdeer & The Short Straws	4:37
3.	"Celestial Blues" (The Avener Rework)	Andy Bey		3:36
4.	"Castle in the Snow"	Guillaume Bozonnet / Amina Cadelli	featuring Kadebostany	3:33
5.	"To Let Myself Go"	Ane Brun	featuring Ane Brun	4:14
6.	"Lonely Boy"	Dan Auerbach / Brian Burton / Patrick Carney	featuring Matt Corby	4:04
7.	"It Serves You Right to Suffer" (The Avener Rework)	John Lee Hooker	featuring John Lee Hooker	3:25
8.	"Hate Street Dialogue"	Dennis Coffey / Gary Harvey	featuring Rodriguez	4:19
9.	"Your Love Rocks"	Tristan Casara / Nikolaj Grandjean	featuring N'Grandjean	4:09
10.	"Waiting 'Round to Die"	Townes Van Zandt	featuring The Be Good Tanyas	4:18
11.	"We Go Home"	Adam Cohen	featuring Adam Cohen	3:14
12.	"La Tourre"	Tristan Casara		3:52
13.	"Waiting Here"	Jake Isaac	featuring Jake Isaac	4:05
14.	"Fade into You" (The Avener Rework)	David Roback / Hope Sandoval	featuring Mazzy Star	4:11
15.	"Fade Out Lines" (Synapson Radio Edit)	Cédric Roux / Craig John Walker	featuring Phoebe Killdeer & The Short Straws	3:05

Disc 2
No.	Title	Length
1.	"The Wanderings of the Avener" (Continuous Mix)	54:11

== Charts ==
=== Weekly charts ===
Chart (2015)	Peak position
Australian Albums (ARIA)	17
Austrian Albums (Ö3 Austria)	44
Belgian Albums (Ultratop Flanders)	14
Belgian Albums (Ultratop Wallonia)	7
Dutch Albums (Album Top 100)	14
French Albums (SNEP)	2
German Albums (Offizielle Top 100)	25
Italian Albums (FIMI)	21
New Zealand Albums (RMNZ)	22
Spanish Albums (Promusicae)	68
Swiss Albums (Schweizer Hitparade)	6

=== Year-end charts ===
Chart (2015)	Position
Belgian Albums (Ultratop Wallonia)	49
French Albums (SNEP)	24
Swiss Albums (Schweizer Hitparade)	66

Chart (2016)	Position
Belgian Albums (Ultratop Wallonia)	120
French Albums (SNEP)	58

== Certifications ==
Region	Certification	Certified units/sales
France (SNEP)	3× Platinum	300,000^{‡}
Switzerland (IFPI Switzerland)	Gold	10,000^{^}
^{^} Shipments figures based on certification alone.^{‡} Sales+streaming figures based on certification alone.

== Release history ==
Region	Date	Format	Label	Catalogue
France	19 January 2015	CD, digital download, LP	Capitol Records	471 694 6
Australia	20 February 2015	CD, digital download, LP	96 Musique	
