= Grand Casino Hotel =

Ninth studio album by Waldeck

Studio album by Waldeck
- Released: 2020

Waldeck chronology
Atlantic Ballroom (2018)	Grand Casino Hotel (2020)	Waldeck presents 20 Years Dope Noir (2022)

Grand Casino Hotel is the ninth studio album by Waldeck, released in 2020. Conceived as the soundtrack for a fictional road movie, it is an associative collection of songs Waldeck and his musical collaborators have been developing over years, with some drafts dating back to 2003. According to the artist, the release is conceived to advocate freedom and human potential in an increasingly limiting political and cultural space. Grand Casino Hotel extends classical Waldeck's musical sound with blues and country elements, invoking a world of nostalgia and imagination.

The album has a total of 12 tracks, and Waldeck features 4 singers throughout the article including Patrizia Ferrara, Zeebee, Joy Malcolm, and Carl Avory.
