= Make My Day =

Make My Day may refer to:

== Music ==
- "Make My Day" (T.G. Sheppard and Clint Eastwood song), 1984
- "Make My Day" (Mai Kuraki song), 2002
- "Make My Day" (Martin Vučić song), 2005
- "Make My Day" (Yui Aragaki song), 2008
- "Make My Day", a song by Labi Siffre from his 1970 self-titled debut album
- "Make My Day", a song by Motörhead from the 1991 album 1916
- "Make My Day", a song by Gotthard from the 1996 album G.
- "Make My Day", a song by Waldeck from the 2007 album Ballroom Stories
- Make My Day, a 2010 album by Maria Haukaas Storeng, or the title song
- Make My Day, a 2012 EP by Pia

== Other uses ==
- Make My Day Law or the Castle Doctrine, an American legal doctrine regarding the use of deadly force in one's residence
- "Go ahead, make my day", a catchphrase used by the fictional film character Dirty Harry Callahan, portrayed by Clint Eastwood
- Make My Day, a 2009 program broadcast by TV Land
- "Make My Day", the twenty-third episode of the 2005 children's television series, Muffin the Mule
- Make My Day (TV series), an anime series produced by 5 Inc. and Netflix
