= Grand Casino =

Grand Casino may refer to:

- Grand Casinos, a defunct casino company
- Grand Casino Biloxi, Mississippi
- Grand Casino Gulfport, Mississippi
- Grand Casino Tunica, Mississippi
- Grand Casino Mille Lacs, Minnesota
- Grand Casino Hinckley, Minnesota
- Grand Casino Hotel Resort, Shawnee, Oklahoma
- Grand Casino Hotel, a 2020 album by Waldeck
