= Gran Paradiso (disambiguation) =

Gran Paradiso may refer to:

- Gran Paradiso, a mountain group between the Aosta Valley and Piedmont regions of north-west Italy
- Gran Paradiso National Park, Italy's oldest national park
- Gran Paradiso (album), a 2016 album by Waldeck
- Gran Paradiso (film), a 2000 German adventure film

== See also ==
- Paradiso (disambiguation)
