= Bärke =

Bärke may refer to:

- Norrbärke Court District in Dalarna, Sweden
- Söderbärke Court District in Dalarna, Sweden
