= Klaus Waldeck =

Austrian musician and producer

Waldeck
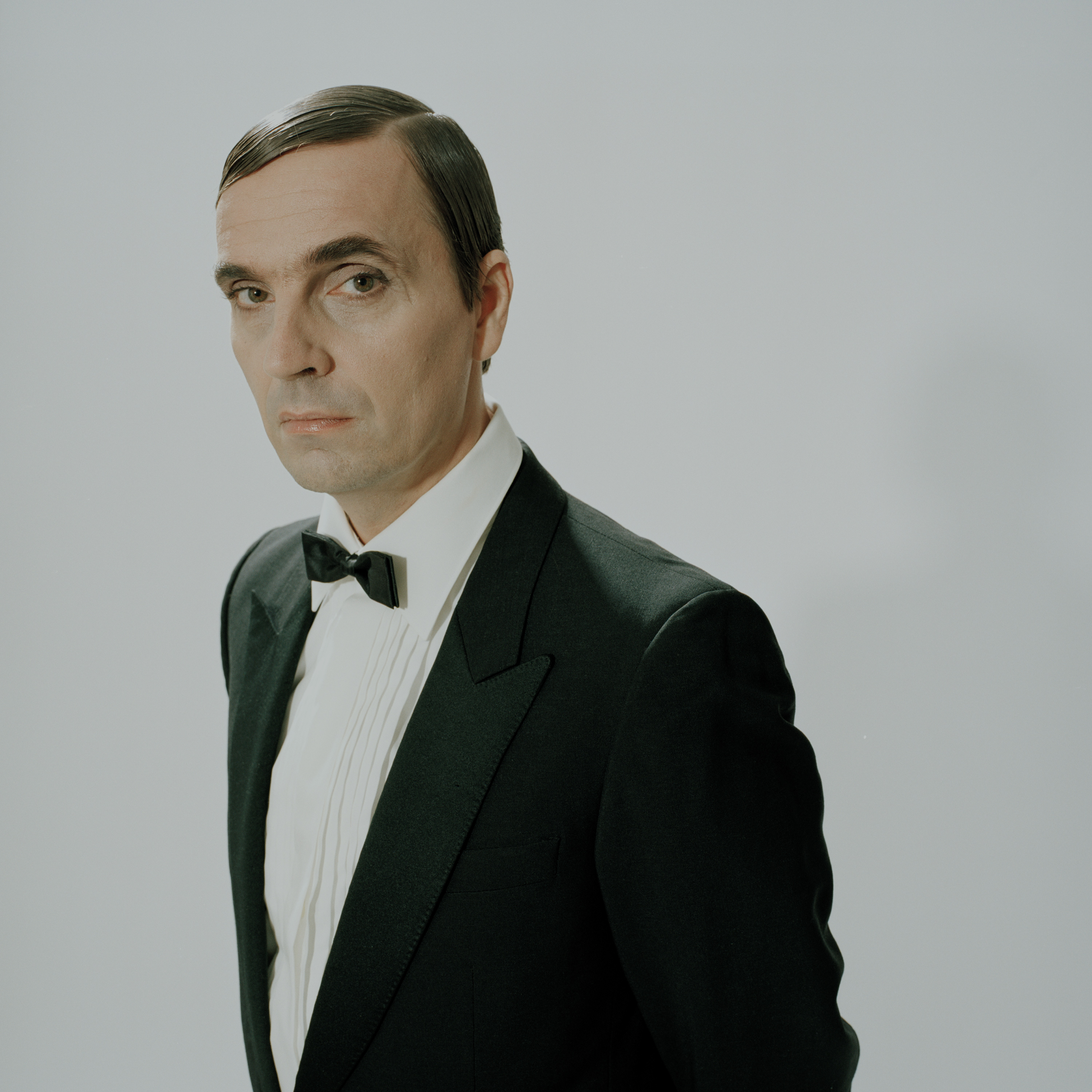
- Klaus Waldeck (from the cover art of "Ballroom Stories")

Background information
- Born: March 23, 1966 (age 60); Vienna, Austria
- Genres: Ambient; downtempo; trip hop; electro swing
- Years active: 1992–present
- Label: Dope Noir
- Website: Waldeck.at

Klaus Waldeck (born March 23, 1966) is an Austrian record producer and performer based in Vienna, Austria. In addition to the music published under his stage name, Waldeck, his label Dope Noir Records has been releasing his music as Saint Privat, Waldeck Sextet and Soul Goodman.

== Early life ==
Klaus Waldeck was born on March 23, 1966, in Vienna, Austria. His two siblings include Peter Waldeck, who is a theater, comic, and fiction writer. In 2008, the brothers collaborated on the musical Fantomas – das Action Musical. Their father, Wolfgang, owned a law firm, which Klaus considered for his career before turning to music.

Waldeck received lessons in classical piano from the age of six. The music video for "Get Up...Carmen" is reminiscent of the young music student manipulating the alarm clock to shorten his mandatory time on the instrument. After graduating from high school, he enrolled at Vienna law school and completed his doctoral thesis on the legal implications of sampling in 1994. Waldeck subsequently passed the Austrian bar exam and briefly worked as a lawyer, but has since suspended his bar membership.

== Career ==
Waldeck relocated to London to complete his legal studies in 1992, where he brought all the music equipment he had accumulated over years of experimenting with sampling and electronic sounds. He started going to clubs, collaborating with local artists, and producing demo tapes. Vocalist Joy Malcolm, who was working with Moby and Incognito at the time, and Brian Amos became important for many of Waldeck's early releases.

After having returned to Vienna in 1996, Waldeck became a defining force for the type of dub/trip-hop-inspired downtempo "Vienna sound" popular throughout the nineties and noughties. Balance of the Force, Waldeck's first full-length album released in 1998, was co-produced by Kruder & Dorfmeister and featured many of the artists Waldeck had been working with in London. The album was published by BMG and received global attention in clubs, radio, and the advertising business.

Following local trends as well as artistic necessity, Waldeck founded his own label Dope Noir in 2001, which has been publishing all his music since. In a 2024 interview, Waldeck calls himself as the "Duracell Bunny of Vienna Sound" because he has continued to publish music in contrast to his peers. The Night Garden, released in the year of Dope Noir's inception, took some inspiration from Massive Attack's iconic Mezzanine and combined electronic elements with the subtle vocal contributions of Amos and Malcolm. It became an instant critical success and helped define the signature narrative noir characteristic of Waldeck's work.

Saint Privat, the musical identity created together with singer Valérie Sajdik, released its debut, Riviera, in 2004 and, somewhat ironically, earned the Amadeus Austrian Music Award for newcomer of the year in 2005. The album was followed by Superflu in 2006. Its opening track, "Poisson Rouge", was used in the official trailer for Paul Feig's 2018 comedy film A Simple Favor.

Ballroom Stories, which introduced vocalist Zeebee in addition to Malcolm and Amos, was released to persistent international presence in 2007. The album evolved as a defining force for the electro swing genre. It sold roughly 35,000 physical copies and has been streamed over 65 million times on Spotify. Many years after their original publication, songs like "Get up...Carmen", "Memories", and "Make My Day" are still being played on the radio, used in TV and advertising, and get thousands of streams every month. Mercedes-Benz used "Make My Day" for the German launch of its C class line of cars. Versace has used "Why Did We Fire the Gun?" for its global TV spot with Candice Swanepoel since 2013. The song can also be heard in season one of the TV legal drama Suits (episode 10). "Jerry Weintraub" was used in episode 12 of the fourth season of Fox's hospital blockbuster, House.

The release of Zeebee's solo project Be My Sailor in 2009 was followed by a prolonged artistic hiatus for Waldeck, during which he searched for new musical angles. At age 50, he resumed piano lessons with noted classical pianist Maria Radutu to keep up with the professionals in his band.

Since 2015, Waldeck has published a series of narrative, cinema-themed works with singers La Heidi and Patrizia Ferrara. Sampling and electronic sounds have been largely replaced by analog instruments and human musicians, as Waldeck tried to distance himself from the overcrowded electro swing genre, which had attracted many epigones since its inception. Keeping the quintessential stylish Waldeck atmosphere and his meticulous production and engineering standards, Gran Paradiso (2016) explores Italian canzone and film scores from classical Cinecittà lore. Atlantic Ballroom (2018) invokes an ocean liner club atmosphere with crime-fiction-inspired jazz and swing sounds. The song "Rough Landing" was used by Ferrero Rocher in a 2019 TV spot, which animated Edward Hopper's painting "Nighthawks". "Keep My Fire Burning" was used in the soundtrack of Grey's Anatomy in its 15th season (episode 10).

Grand Casino Hotel (2020) was conceived as music for a fictional road movie, releasing many compositions Waldeck had developed with Carl Avory, Joy Malcolm, Patrizia Ferrara, and Zeebee over the years. In an interview, Waldeck called the album a plea for freedom in a culture restricted by algorithms and closed-circuit political debate.

Despite waning significance in the age of digital streaming, Waldeck has retained his devotion to the album format. In a 2019 interview, he recounted laboring for seven weeks over the final track listing for Atlantic Ballroom. For its 20th anniversary, Waldeck's Dope Noir label released a hand-numbered vinyl collection in 2022, consisting of five mini-albums which gathered mostly unreleased work by Waldeck, Waldeck Sextet, Soul Goodman, and Saint Privat. "Boom, Boom Click!" by Saint Privat has been used in season three of Netflix's Emily in Paris. In the same year, "Quando Quando", a remix of a 2018 Waldeck release by French DJ and producer The Avener, reached top chart positions in France, Belgium and Spain.

The Moon and the Orient was released in June 2024. The album's twelve songs have been described by the artist as a sentimental celebration of the power of artistic imagination and the narrative potential of human becoming and passing. It has been noted for its subtle return to electronic effects. The album blends Waldeck's signature electronic sounds with oriental motifs and "chanson-bossa nova" elements. While featuring longtime collaborator Patrizia Ferrara, the work also includes vocal contributions from Zeebee and drag performer Lucy McEvil.

== Studio, stage, and screen collaborators ==
While none of Waldeck's musical identities have been conceived as collaborative band projects, the following artists have made notable contributions to his music. Waldeck Sextet's 2020 celebratory show at Porgy & Bess Jazz Club had ten live musicians on stage while Waldeck's current live configuration features six performers.

Musicians

- Hermann Aigner (Drums)
- Carl Avory (Vocals)
- Jürger Bauer (Bass)
- Darius Edlinger (Guitar)
- Patrizia Ferrara (Vocals)
- Josef Fuchsberger (Trumpet)
- Thomas Hechenberger (Guitar)
- Clemens Hofer (Trombone)
- Florian Klinger (Vibraphone)
- Rüdiger Kostron (Bass)
- Joy Malcolm (Vocals)
- Philipp Moosbrugger (Standup Bass)
- Marc Osterer (Trumpet)
- Alex Pohn (Drums)
- Valérie Sajdik (Vocals)
- Gerald Selig (Saxophone)
- Martin Spitzer (Guitar)
- Wolfgang Stieger (Mastering)
- Georg Tomandl (Mastering, Sunshine Mastering)
- Sashko Wladigeroff (Trumpet)
- Zeebee (Vocals)

Cover Art

- Darius Edlinger
- Luca Gastaldi
- Bernhard Winkler

Video Clips

- Darius Edlinger
- Luca Gastaldi
- Bernhard Sordian
- Mario Soldo (Mother Agency)

== Genre ==
Waldeck's early releases explored contemporary downtempo and trip hop trends. Ballroom Stories, his greatest commercial success, has become the prototype of electro swing, while his recent releases have increasingly featured analogue sounds with a cinematographic mood. Most of Waldeck's songs convey genre ambitions and a serene attitude. Over his career, he has explored classical piano pieces, swing, country, jazz, latin, among numerous other genres. His varied oeuvre also reflects the recruitment of diverse vocalists and collaborators like Zeebee, Joy Malcolm, Brian Amos, Valérie Sajdik, and Patrizia Ferrara.

== Discography ==
=== Albums and EPs ===
as Waldeck

- Northern Lights – EP (Spray Records, 1996)
- Balance of the Force (BMG,1998)
- Balance of the Force Remixed (BMG,1998)
- The Night Garden (BMG, 2001)
- The Night Garden Reflowered (Dope Noir, 2002)
- Ballroom Stories (Dope Noir, 2007)
- Gran Paradiso (Dope Noir, 2016)
- Atlantic Ballroom (Dope Noir, 2018)
- Grand Casino Hotel (Dope Noir, 2020)
- Waldeck presents 20 Years Dope Noir (Dope Noir, 2022)
- The Moon and the Orient (Dope Noir, 2024)

as Saint Privat

- Riviera (Dope Noir, 2004)
- Superflu (Dope Noir, 2006)
- Après la Bohème (Dope Noir, 2023)

=== Singles ===
as Waldeck

- "Aquarius" (1997)
- "Wake Up" (1997)
- "Children of the Ghetto" (1998)
- "Defenceless" (1999)
- "This Isn't Maybe" (2000)
- "Tears Running Dry" (2002)
- "Make My Day" (2006)
