= Saint Privat (band) =

Austrian electronica band

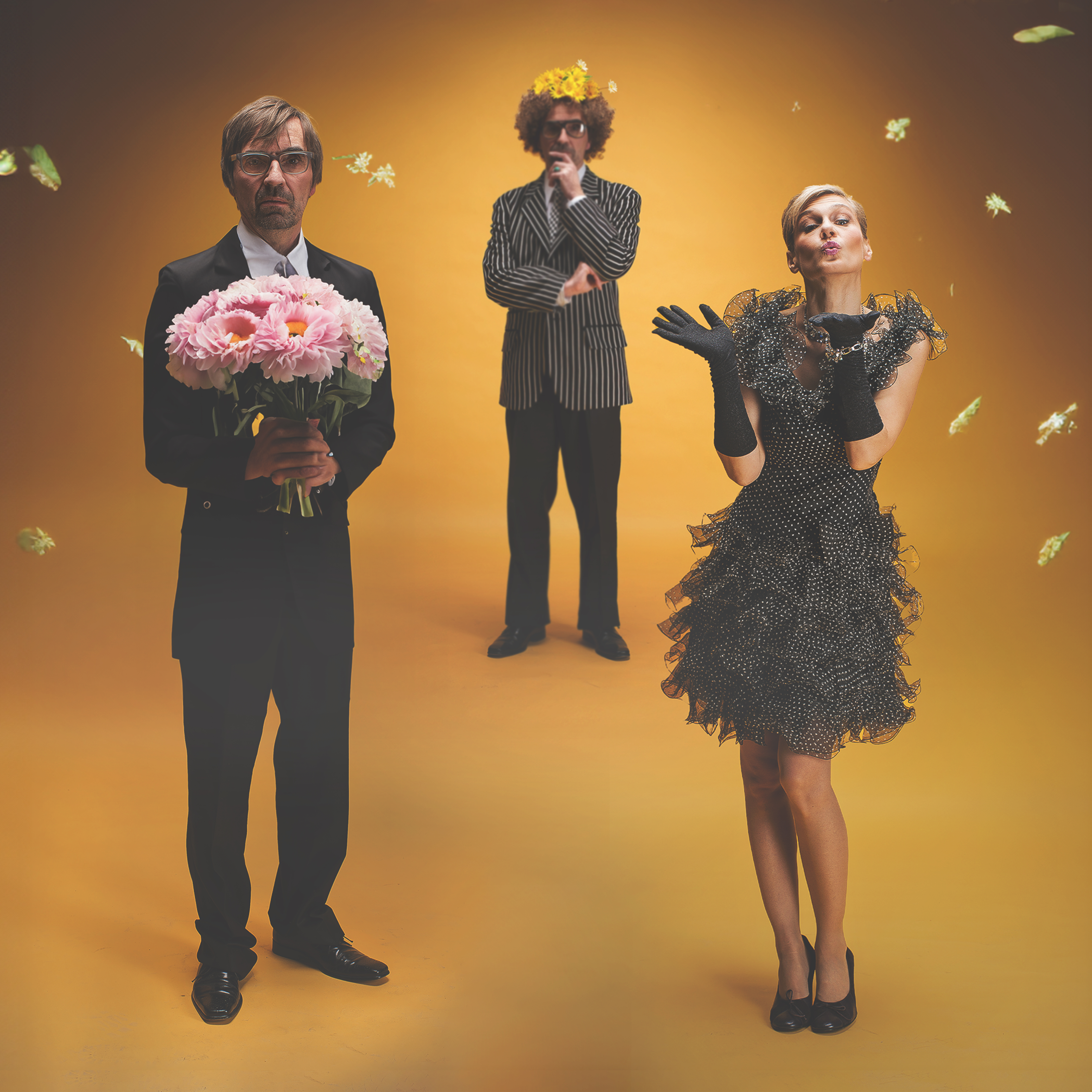

Background information
- Origin: Vienna, Austria
- Genres: Electronica with Bossa nova
- Years active: 2002 - present
- Label: Dope Noir Records
- Members: Valérie Sajdik (voc); Klaus Waldeck (prod, keys); Martin Spitzer (git); Rüdiger Kostron (b); Hermann Aigner (d)
- Past members: Clemens Wabra (git) Erwin Schober (d) Shayan Fathi (d)
- Website: https://www.waldeck.at/saintprivat

Saint Privat is a music project conceived by producer Klaus Waldeck and singer Valérie Sajdik in 2004. Inspired by classic Italian and French film music, Saint Privat has released three albums (Riviera, 2004; Superflu, 2006; Après la Bohème, 2023).

Both Sajdik and Waldeck had notable musical careers before they met at a wedding in Vienna. Waldeck had already scored international attention with his early Trip hop and Downtempo productions having shelved his legal career for his musical pursuits. Acting as "musical Hitchcock", Waldeck acts as composer, arranger, and producer on Saint Privat releases, making only rare appearances as a performer on keys and electronic effects.

Sajdik finished her law degree in Paris in 2000, having graduated from music conservatory in Vienna and her girl band, C-Bra, had fallen apart. Getting exhausted with the French capital, she relocated to Saint-Privat, a small hamlet in the southern region Occitania which was just becoming attractive for bohemians, artists, recovering drug users, and enterprising homemakers. Local hearsay claims that George Harrison and members of Pink Floyd stayed for some time in the community. Novelist and screenwriter Ian McEwan became attracted to the picturesque village to relax, renovate an abandoned building, and work on Black Dogs Sajdik has been a permanent resident of Saint Privat since 2002.

== Albums ==
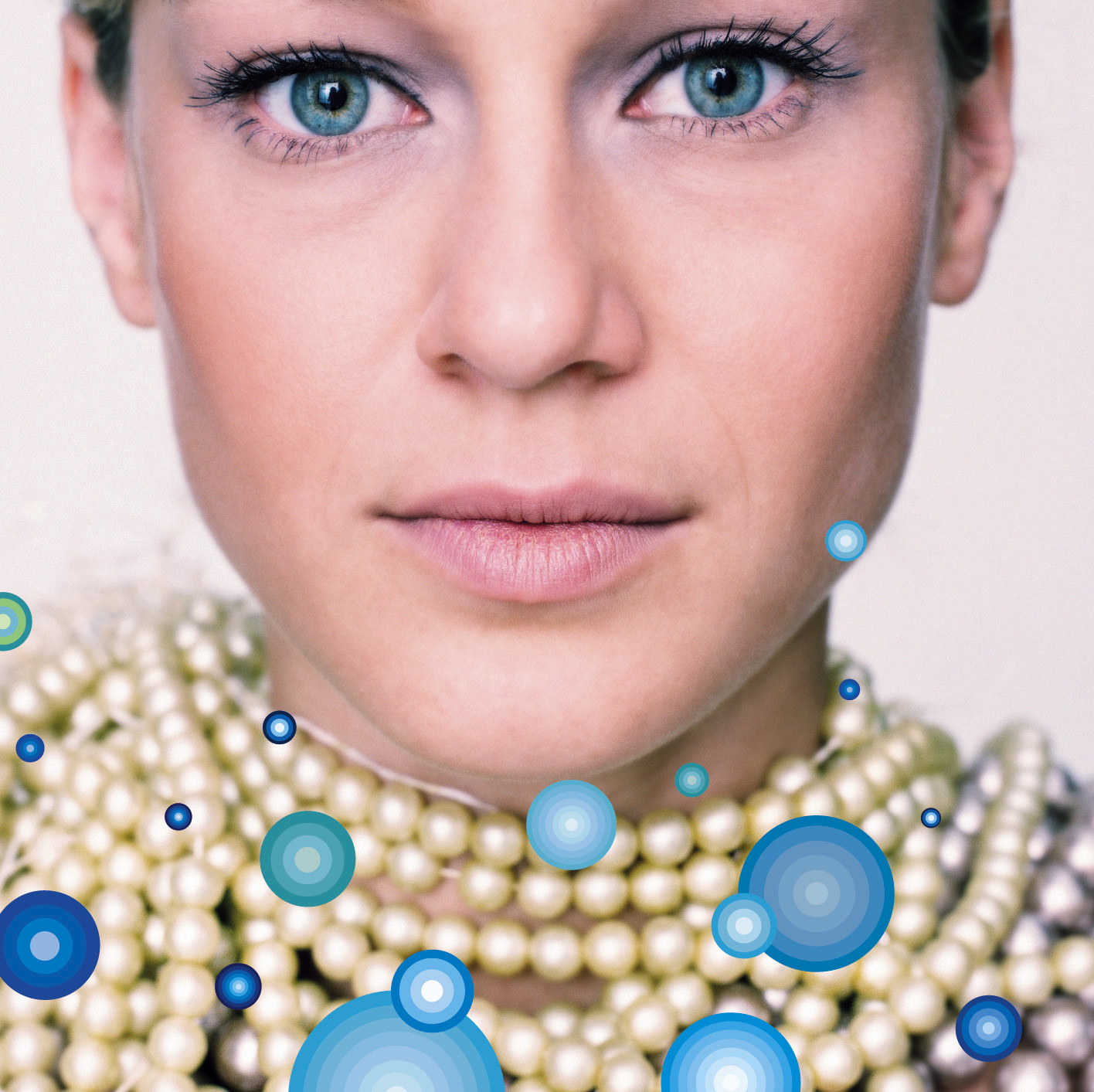
Album cover for Riviera

Riviera

The project's first album Riviera was developed with jazz musicians Clemens Wabra on guitar, Rüdiger Kostron on bass, and Shayan Fathi on drums. In a 2019 interview, Waldeck cites Romanian piano legend Eugen Cicero as an inspiration for the compositions, who had made musical crossover popular with his 1965 release of Rokoko Jazz. Many tracks keenly refer to guitar work Antônio Carlos Jobim had developed for Bossa nova while others boast classical genes ("Bach en dub"; "September Song" by Kurt Weill). Performed in English or French, the eleven songs celebrate a carefree nostalgia for glamorous beachfront life in the sixties, as popularized by music and movies. Saint Privat received the award for "Newcomer of the Year" at the Austrian Amadeus Music Awards in 2005.

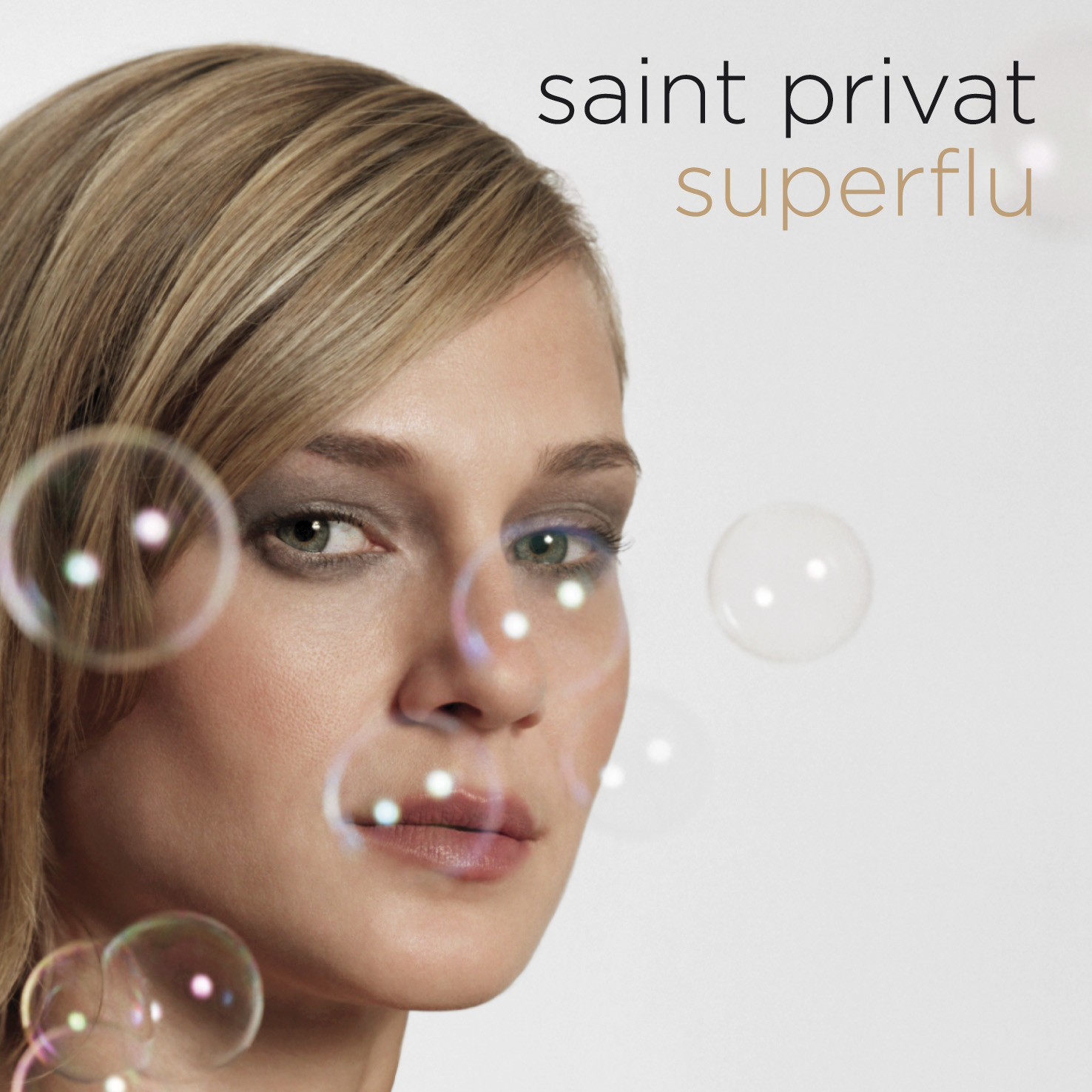
Album cover for Superflu

Superflu

The project's 2006 release Superflu continues its re-imagination of the sixties and the decadent ease of musical francophilia. Developed by experimenting live at Dope Noir's Vienna studios, the record ponders the decade's darker moments epitomized by Roman Polanski's 1968 movie Rosemary's Baby and gently strips Jefferson Airplane's "Somebody to Love" from its rock pathos “Poisson Rouge”, Superflu's opening track, was used in the Amazon Prime Video tv-serie Etoile and in the movie trailer for Paul Feig's 2018 comedy A Simple Favor.

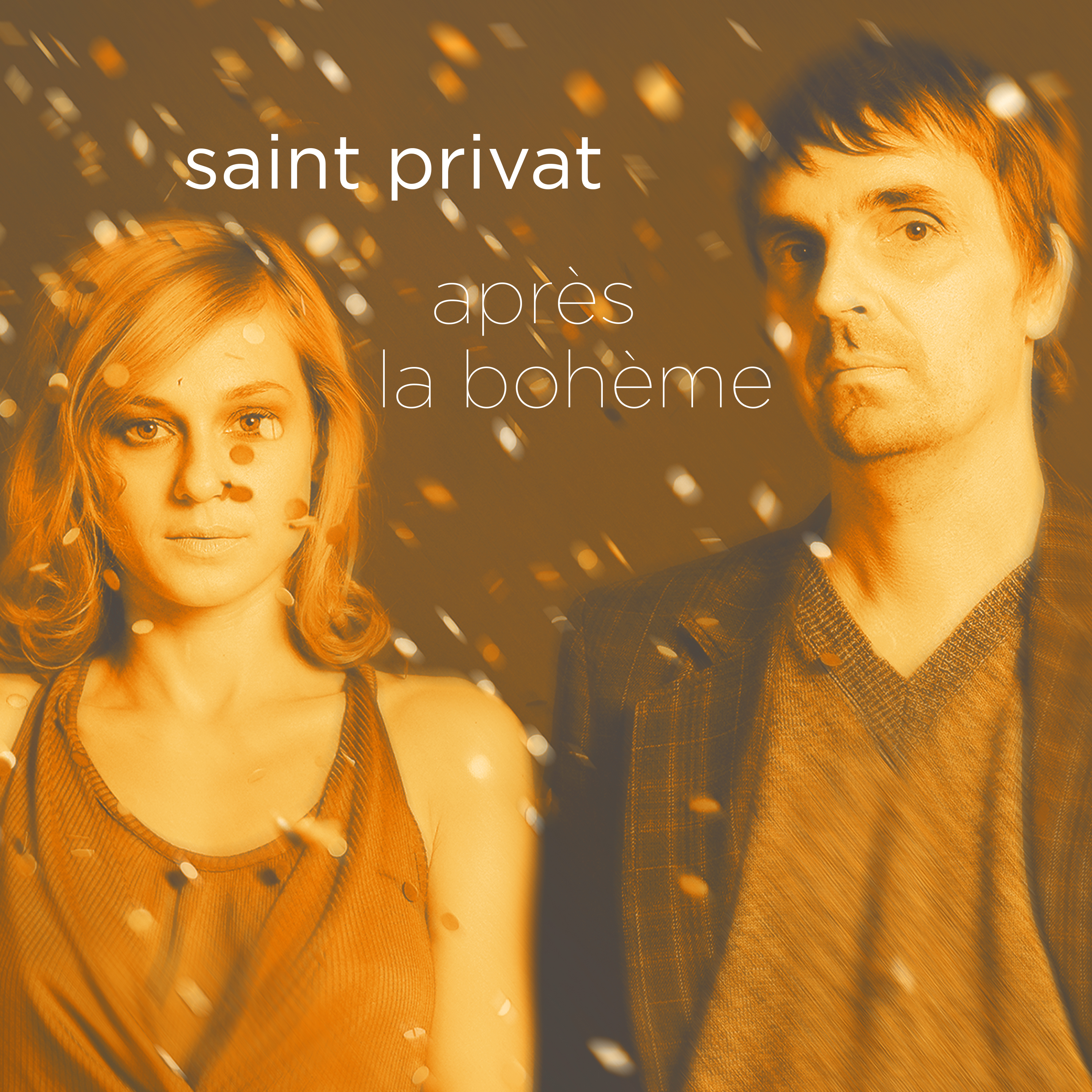
Cover for Après la Bohème

Après la Bohème

Après la Bohème was released in July 2023. Its pre-released single "Boom, Boom Click" was heard in season three of Netflix's Emily in Paris and on the red carpet of the 2023 Festival de Cannes. The song was inspired by story of actress-singer Clandine Longet who (perhaps accidentally) shot her lover in 1976.

Après la Boheme includes twelve songs - swinging tongue-in-cheek narratives ("Boom, Boom Click", "Regarde-moi Joe"), jazzy tales of romance ("Bossa Casanova"), a melancholic "Le Tailleur de Pierre" and pure feel good ("Toi et moi"). In an interview, Waldeck concedes "an almost nostalgic psychedelic character" of the album Sajdik and he had been working on since 2020.
