= Colette Ritz =

French pop singer

- Born: Benitte Colette; 8 May 1932; Paris, France
- Died: 9 September 2007 (aged 75) Proisy, France
- Genres: Pop
- Occupation: Singer
- Years active: 1960s

Colette Ritz, real name Benitte Colette (Paris, 8 May 1932 – Proisy, 9 September 2007) was a French pop singer of the 1960s.
