= Vad (Someș) =

- Location within Romania

Location
- Country: Romania
- Counties: Cluj County
- Villages: Bogata de Sus, Bogata de Jos, Vad

Physical characteristics
- Mouth: Someș
  - location: Vad
  - coordinates: 47.2199°N 23.7495°E
- Length: 9 km (5.6 mi)
- Basin size: 40 km^{2} (15 sq mi)

Basin features
- Progression: Someș→ Tisza→ Danube→ Black Sea

The Vad is a left tributary of the river Someș in Romania. It discharges into the Someș in the village Vad. Its length is 9 km (5.6 mi) and its basin size is 40 km^{2} (15 sq mi).
