= Low Millions =

American pop-rock group

- Origin: California, U.S.
- Genres: Pop rock; post-punk revival
- Years active: 2004–2005
- Labels: EMI; Manhattan
- Members: Adam Cohen; Michael Chaves; Jorgen Carlsson; Erik Eldenius

Low Millions was a pop-rock band from California led by Canadian singer/songwriter Adam Cohen, son of Leonard Cohen.

When Adam Cohen was in-between solo records in 2004, he was approached by Capitol Records for English-language material after signing him to a deal for what would be his French language solo album Mélancolista. He auditioned for Manhattan Records in New York City, and was signed after 15 minutes of a solo acoustic performance, which led to the formation of Low Millions.

== Ex-Girlfriends ==
Low Millions' only album, Ex-Girlfriends, yielded two singles, "Eleanor" and "Statue". "Eleanor" reached the Top 5 of Billboard's Triple A chart and the Top 30 of the Adult Top 40 chart in late 2004.

All of the songs in Ex-Girlfriends were written by Cohen, with co-writes with Tonio K, Davitt Sigerson and Jay Joyce. Cohen was also producer or co-producer of some of the songs, with others produced by Keith Forsey, Patrick Leonard, David Kahne, and Brian Reeves.

== Concert performances ==
Low Millions played a number of concerts in 2004 and 2005, opening up for Collective Soul, Vanessa Carlton, John Fogerty, and Gavin DeGraw among others.

== Discography ==
- Ex-Girlfriends (2004)

== Members ==
- Adam Cohen – vocals, guitar(singer/guitarist)
- Michael Chaves – vocals, guitar
- Jorgen Carlsson – vocals, bass
- Erik Eldenius – drums
