= Fade Out Lines =

2014 debut single by the Avener

Single by the Avener

from the album The Wanderings of the Avener
- Released: 26 September 2014
- Genre: Deep house
- Length: 4:34
- Label: Capitol
- Songwriters: Phoebe Tolmer; Craig Walker; Cedric Le Roux
- Producer: Tristan Casara

The Avener singles chronology
| "Fade Out Lines" (2014) | "Hate Street Dialogue" (2014) |

Music video
- "Fade Out Lines" on YouTube

"Fade Out Lines" is a song by French music producer The Avener. It is a deep house rework of "The Fade Out Line", an original song by Australian band Phoebe Killdeer & the Short Straws from their 2011 album Innerquake. It was written by Phoebe Killdeer, composed by Cédric Le Roux and Archive singer Craig Walker, and produced by the Avener. First released in October 2013 through French independent label 96 Musique, it became a chart hit in 2014, entering the French Singles Chart in April 2014 and ultimately reaching number three in November, and debuting at number one on the German Singles Chart in October. It went on to serve as the lead single from his self-titled American EP (2015), and his debut album The Wanderings of the Avener (2015).

== Music video ==
The official music video made for the original song directed by Mark Nava was released onto Youtube on 1 April 2013. music video to accompany the release of "Fade Out Lines" featuring Fleur Geffrier was first released onto YouTube on 20 October 2014.

== Track listing ==
Digital, on 96 Records / Kwaidan / Capitol (Universal)
| No. | Title | Length |
|---|---|---|
| 1. | "Fade Out Lines" | 3:14 |

CD single, Capitol (Universal)
| No. | Title | Length |
|---|---|---|
| 1. | "Fade Out Lines" | 4:34 |
| 2. | "Fade Out Lines" (Alle Farben Remix) | 6:49 |

== Charts ==
=== Weekly charts ===
Weekly chart performance for "Fade Out Lines"
| Chart (2014–15) | Peak position |
|---|---|
| Australia (ARIA) | 8 |
| Austria (Ö3 Austria Top 40) | 1 |
| Belgium (Ultratop 50 Flanders) | 24 |
| Belgium (Ultratop 50 Wallonia) | 2 |
| CIS Airplay (TopHit) | 20 |
| Czech Republic Airplay (ČNS IFPI) | 28 |
| Denmark (Tracklisten) | 5 |
| France (SNEP) | 3 |
| Germany (GfK) | 1 |
| Hungary (Dance Top 40) | 13 |
| Hungary (Rádiós Top 40) | 1 |
| Hungary (Single Top 40) | 3 |
| Ireland (IRMA) | 55 |
| Italy (FIMI) | 6 |
| Netherlands (Dutch Top 40) | 35 |
| Netherlands (Single Top 100) | 26 |
| Romania (Airplay 100) | 54 |
| Slovenia (SloTop50) | 6 |
| Spain (PROMUSICAE) | 27 |
| Sweden Heatseeker (Sverigetopplistan) | 15 |
| Switzerland (Schweizer Hitparade) | 3 |
| UK Singles (OCC) | 60 |

=== Year-end charts ===
Annual chart rankings for "Fade Out Lines"
| Chart (2014) | Position |
|---|---|
| Austria (Ö3 Austria Top 40) | 57 |
| Belgium (Ultratop 50 Wallonia) | 87 |
| France (SNEP) | 25 |
| Germany (Official German Charts) | 31 |
| Italy (FIMI) | 56 |
| Switzerland (Schweizer Hitparade) | 48 |

| Chart (2015) | Position |
|---|---|
| Belgium (Ultratop 50 Wallonia) | 19 |
| CIS (TopHit) | 45 |
| France (SNEP) | 18 |
| Germany (Official German Charts) | 82 |
| Hungary (Dance Top 40) | 53 |
| Hungary (Rádiós Top 40) | 4 |
| Hungary (Single Top 40) | 12 |
| Italy (FIMI) | 100 |
| Netherlands (NPO 3FM) | 97 |
| Russia Airplay (TopHit) | 38 |
| Switzerland (Schweizer Hitparade) | 35 |

| Chart (2016) | Position |
|---|---|
| France (SNEP) | 150 |
| Hungary (Rádiós Top 40) | 87 |

== Certifications ==
| Region | Certification | Certified units/sales |
|---|---|---|
| Australia (ARIA) | Platinum | 70,000^{^} |
| Austria (IFPI Austria) | Gold | 15,000^{*} |
| Brazil (Pro-Música Brasil) | Gold | 30,000^{‡} |
| France (SNEP) | Diamond | 333,333^{‡} |
| Germany (BVMI) | Platinum | 400,000^{‡} |
| Italy (FIMI) | 2× Platinum | 60,000^{‡} |
| New Zealand (RMNZ) | Platinum | 30,000^{‡} |
| Spain (PROMUSICAE) | Gold | 30,000^{‡} |
| Switzerland (IFPI Switzerland) | Gold | 15,000^{‡} |
^{*} Sales figures based on certification alone.^{^} Shipments figures based on certification alone.^{‡} Sales+streaming figures based on certification alone.

== Release history ==
| Region | Date | Format(s) | Label | Ref. |
|---|---|---|---|---|
| Various | 14 October 2013 | Digital download | 96 Musique; Kwaidan Records | |
| France | 14 July 2014 | Digital download | Capitol | |
| France | 13 September 2014 | Digital download (remixes EP) | Capitol | |
| Germany | 19 September 2014 | Digital download | Capitol | |
| Germany | 19 September 2014 | Digital download (remixes EP) | Capitol | |
| Germany | 26 September 2014 | CD single | Capitol | |
| Germany | 17 October 2014 | 12" vinyl | Capitol | |
| United States | 4 November 2014 | Digital download | Casablanca | |
| United States | 15 December 2014 | Digital download (remixes EP) | Casablanca; Republic | |
| United Kingdom | 8 March 2015 | Digital download (UK radio edit) | Universal; Island | |

== Use in media ==
The song was used in the German Movie Windstorm 2 (a sequel to Windstorm) from 2015.

In June 2017, the song was used in a Peugeot 208 TV advertisement that was broadcast in Portugal.

In June 2019, the original version "Fade Out Line" was featured in the ending credits of season 2, episode 1 of HBO's Big Little Lies.
