= The Avener =

French DJ and producer (born 1987)

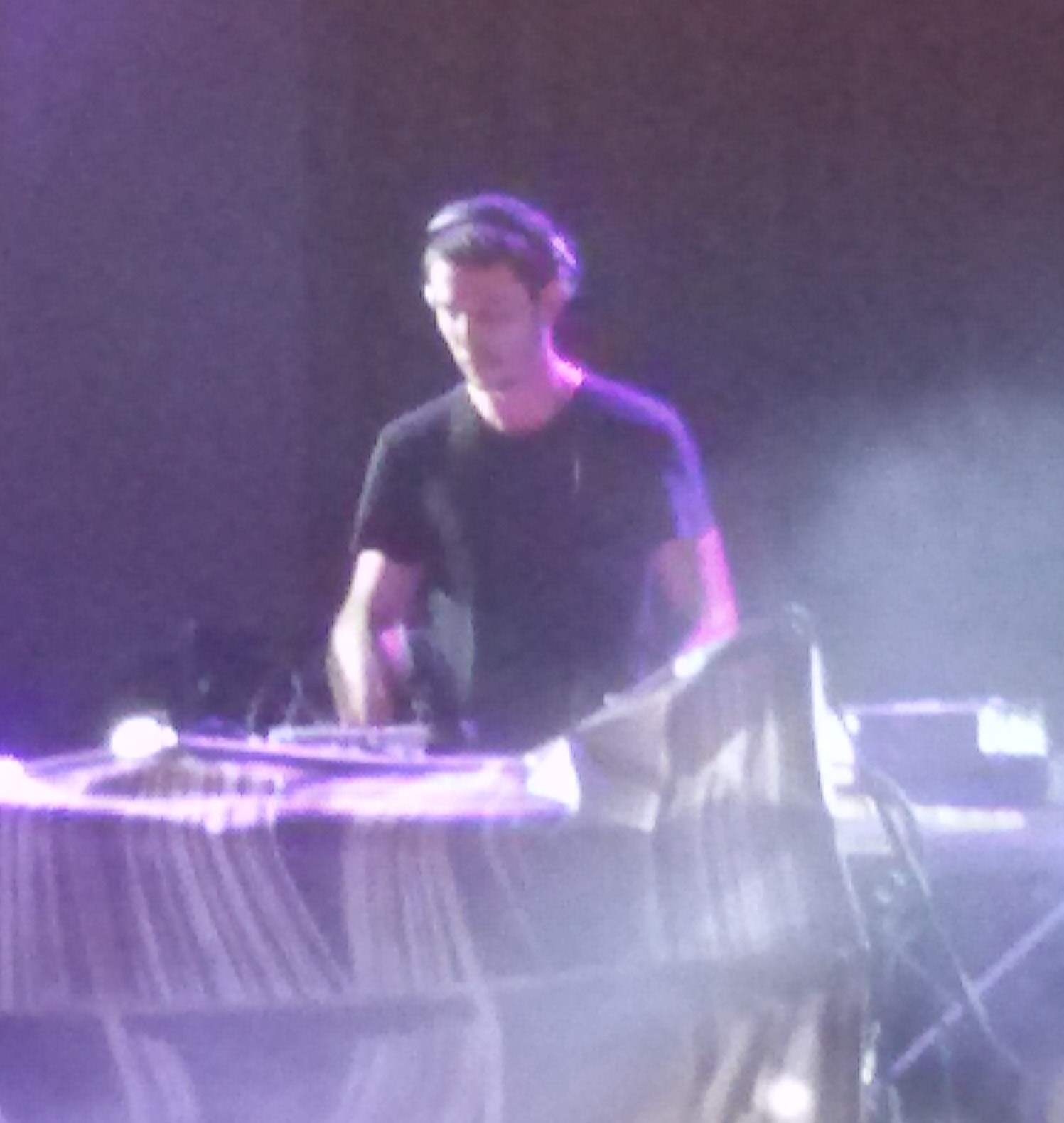
- The Avener in Florence, 2015

Background information
- Born: Tristan Casara; 23 January 1987 (age 39)
- Origin: Nice, France
- Genres: Deep house; electro
- Occupation: Producer
- Years active: 2014–present

Tristan Casara (born 23 January 1987), known by his stage name The Avener (/ˈævənər/), is a French deep house and electro DJ and music producer from Nice. He is best known for his 2014 single "Fade Out Lines", a deep house rework of "The Fade Out Line", a song by Phoebe Killdeer & The Short Straws.

== Name ==
The word "avener"—from Latin "avēna", "oats"—is a historical title for an officer who provided oats to stabled horses. "The Avener" also contains the word "heaven" as a substring, as highlighted on the album art for the Avener's second album, Heaven.

== Career ==
In September 2014 the Avener released his debut single "Fade Out Lines", a deep house rework of "The Fade Out Line", a song by Phoebe Killdeer & The Short Straws. The song peaked at number 3 in France. The song reached number 1 in Austria, Germany and Spain, the song was also a top-10 hit in Australia, Belgium, Denmark, Italy and Switzerland. He released his debut studio album The Wanderings of the Avener in January 2015, peaking at number 2 in France. The album also includes the singles "Hate Street Dialogue", "To Let Myself Go" and "Panama".

In 2015, the Avener was partnered with the FIA World Endurance Championship and played a set at each race weekend.

In August 2015, it was revealed that the Avener would provide production for Mylène Farmer's tenth studio album, including the lead single "Stolen Car", a duet with Sting.

In April 2026, he headlined the "Printemps des vins de Blaye" festival, performing a deep house set within the historic Citadel of Blaye in Haute-Gironde.

== Discography ==
=== Albums ===
Title	Details	Peak chart positions							
Title	Details	FRA	AUS	AUT	BEL	GER	NL	NZ	SWI
The Wanderings of the Avener	Released: 19 January 2015; Format: Digital download, CD; Label: Capitol	2	17	44	7	25	14	22	6
Heaven	Released: 24 January 2020; Format: Digital download, CD, vinyl; Label: Capitol	16	—	—	—	—	—	—	19

=== Extended plays ===
Title	Details
The Avener	Released: 20 January 2015; Format: Digital download; Label: Capitol

=== Singles ===
Year	Title	Peak chart positions										Certifications (sales threshold)	Album
Year	Title	FRA	AUS	AUT	BEL	DEN	GER	ITA	NL	SWI	UK	Certifications (sales threshold)	Album
2014	"Fade Out Lines"	3	8	1	2	5	1	6	26	3	60	ARIA: Platinum; IFPI AUT: Gold; BVMI: Platinum; FIMI: 2× Platinum; IFPI SWI: Gold	The Wanderings of the Avener
2014	"Hate Street Dialogue" (featuring Rodriguez)	101	—	—	—	—	82	—	—	41	—		The Wanderings of the Avener
2015	"To Let Myself Go" (featuring Ane Brun)	17	—	—	59	—	—	—	—	69	—		The Wanderings of the Avener
2015	"Panama"	128	—	—	—	—	—	—	—	—	—		The Wanderings of the Avener
2015	"Castle in the Snow" (with Kadebostany)	20	—	—	3	—	—	—	—	—	—		The Wanderings of the Avener
2015	"You're My Window to the Sky" (with Kim Churchill)	119	—	—	—	—	—	—	—	—	—		Non-album single
2016	"We Go Home"	164	—	—	—	—	—	—	—	—	—		The Wanderings of the Avener
2016	"You Belong" (with Laura Gibson)	28	—	—	—	—	—	—	—	—	—		Non-album singles
2017	"I Need a Good One" (featuring Mark Asari)	76	—	—	—	—	—	—	—	—	—		Non-album singles
2019	"Beautiful" (featuring Bipolar Sunshine)	128	—	—	—	—	—	—	—	—	—		Heaven
2021	"Run Away with Me" (featuring Manu Lanvin)	–	—	—	—	—	—	—	—	—	—		Non-album singles
2022	"Quando Quando" (with Waldeck, featuring Patrizia Ferrara)	82	—	—	15	—	—	—	—	—	—		Non-album singles
2026	"Starlight" (with Ultra Naté)	—	—	—	—	—	—	—	—	—	—		Non-album singles
"—" denotes a single that did not chart or was not released in that territory.
