= Vadu =

Vadu may refer to several villages in Romania:

- Vadu, a village in the commune of Corbu, Constanța
- Vadu, a village in the commune of Sântămăria-Orlea, Hunedoara County
- Vadu, a village in the commune of Vărgata, Mureș County

== See also ==
- Vad (disambiguation)
