= Gubbo =

- Location within Dalarna Location within Sweden
- Coordinates: 60°11′N 15°19′E
- Country: Sweden
- Province: Dalarna
- County: Dalarna County
- Municipality: Smedjebacken Municipality

Area
  - Total: 0.54 km^{2} (0.21 sq mi)

Population (31 December 2010)
  - Total: 215
  - Density: 398/km^{2} (1,030/sq mi)
- Time zone: UTC+1 (CET)
  - Summer (DST): UTC+2 (CEST)

Gubbo is a locality situated in Smedjebacken Municipality, Dalarna County, Sweden, with 215 inhabitants in 2010.
