= Smedjebacken Municipality =

Smedjebacken Municipality Smedjebackens kommun
- Municipality
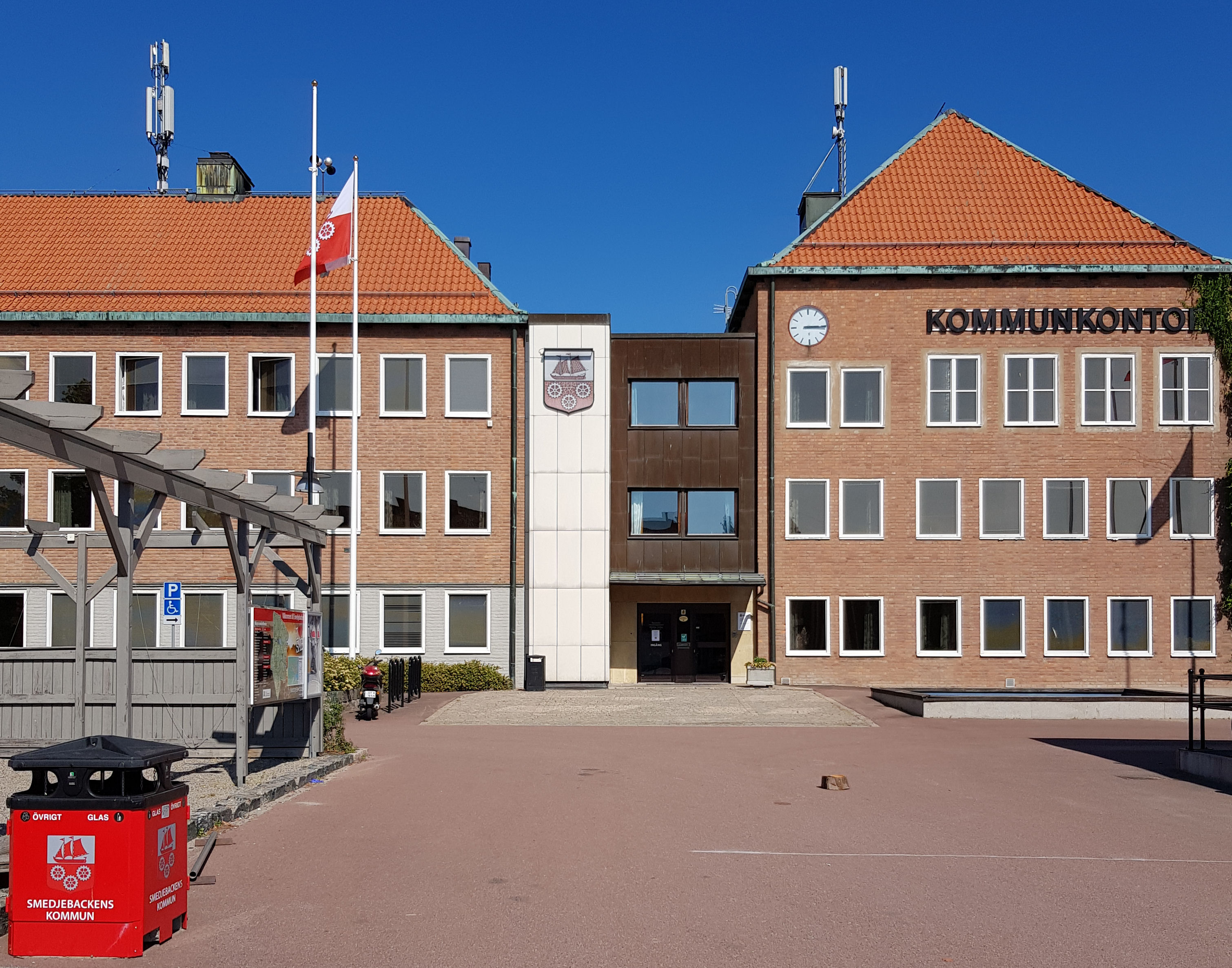

- Flag Coat of arms

- Coordinates: 60°08′N 15°25′E
- Country: Sweden
- County: Dalarna County
- Seat: Smedjebacken

Area
  - Total: 1,057.81 km^{2} (408.42 sq mi)
  - Land: 947.92 km^{2} (365.99 sq mi)
  - Water: 109.89 km^{2} (42.43 sq mi)
- Area as of 1 January 2014.

Population (30 June 2025)
  - Total: 10,781
  - Density: 11.373/km^{2} (29.457/sq mi)
- Time zone: UTC+1 (CET)
  - Summer (DST): UTC+2 (CEST)
- ISO 3166 code: SE
- Province: Dalarna
- Municipal code: 2061
- Website: www.smedjebacken.se
- Density is calculated using land area only.

Smedjebacken Municipality (Swedish: Smedjebackens kommun) is a municipality in Dalarna County in central Sweden. Its seat is located in the town of Smedjebacken.

The present municipality was formed in two steps during the last nationwide local government reform in Sweden. In 1967 the market town (köping) Smedjebacken was reunited with Norrbärke from which it had been detached in 1918. In 1974 Söderbärke was added.

The municipality borders to eight other municipalities.

The coat of arms depicts a sailing ship and cogwheels. These are intended to show the old and new industry sectors of the municipality. It was first granted 1947, but has undergone a few redesigns since. In Smedjebacken there is a skiingclub NSKalpin.com which has a live webcamera from the slope. Also close by is Lernbo where the biggest sportsfishing retailer in Europe has its headquarters.

== Localities ==
- Gubbo
- Hagge
- Ludvika (minor part)
- Smedjebacken (seat)
- Söderbärke
- Vad

== Demographics ==
This is a demographic table based on Smedjebacken Municipality's electoral districts in the 2022 Swedish general election sourced from SVT's election platform, in turn taken from SCB official statistics.

In total there were 10,924 residents, including 8,649 Swedish citizens of voting age. 48.2 % voted for the left coalition and 50.6 % for the right coalition. Indicators are in percentage points except population totals and income.

Location	Residents	Citizen adults	Left vote	Right vote	Employed	Swedish parents	Foreign heritage	Income SEK	Degree
Location			%	%					
Hagge-Harnäs	1,625	1,286	42.3	56.9	86	92	8	27,956	32
Morgårdshammar-Gubbo	1,843	1,524	54.7	44.3	81	89	11	24,327	25
Smedjebacken C	1,373	1,070	58.4	40.4	74	77	23	20,311	24
Smedjebacken N	1,857	1,400	52.4	46.3	79	82	18	24,760	28
Smedjebacken S	1,532	1,185	49.4	49.3	80	82	18	23,742	22
Söderbärke-Malingsbo	2,072	1,691	40.3	58.0	83	90	10	25,141	30
Sörbo-Vad	622	493	37.6	62.1	85	87	13	26,566	24
Source: SVT

== Riksdag elections ==
Year	%	Votes	V	S	MP	C	L	KD	M	SD	NyD	Left	Right
1973	91.7	8,275	5.7	61.4		21.2	5.3	1.0	5.0			67.3	31.6
1976	92.5	8,731	5.3	60.3		21.3	5.7	1.0	6.3			65.5	33.3
1979	92.9	8,856	5.2	61.3		16.4	6.0	1.1	9.1			66.5	31.5
1982	92.8	8,926	5.6	63.4	1.2	14.7	3.4	0.8	10.7			69.0	28.8
1985	91.1	8,842	6.5	61.7	1.4	11.7	8.2		10.4			68.2	30.3
1988	85.8	8,281	7.5	60.8	3.9	11.3	6.8	1.7	7.7			72.2	25.9
1991	85.6	8,324	6.3	52.6	2.7	9.2	5.4	4.6	11.3		7.1	59.0	30.4
1994	87.3	8,275	8.6	60.4	4.5	8.0	3.7	1.7	11.6		1.0	73.4	25.0
1998	82.1	7,401	19.2	47.9	4.0	4.8	2.2	6.9	13.6			71.1	27.4
2002	77.8	6,693	11.5	55.1	3.7	6.6	6.9	5.1	9.4	0.5		70.3	28.0
2006	81.6	6,839	7.6	53.7	2.9	7.3	3.2	3.5	16.1	2.2		64.2	30.1
2010	85.2	7,200	6.7	50.9	4.1	5.1	3.4	2.7	19.7	6.4		61.7	30.8
2014	87.4	7,391	6.7	44.1	3.6	5.4	1.9	2.1	15.0	18.5		54.4	24.4
2018	88.1	7,440	7.6	39.0	2.1	6.3	2.5	4.5	13.9	22.9		55.0	43.8
2022	86.4	7,368	5.3	36.3	2.4	4.1	1.9	4.1	14.1	30.5		48.2	50.6

== Notable natives ==
- Jussi Björling, tenor
- Lars Frölander, swimmer
- Mando Diao, rock band
- Sugarplum Fairy, pop band
- Per Fosshaug, bandy player
- Dozer, stoner rock band
- Erik Eriksson, Centre Party's first chairman
- Lars Jonsson, ice hockey player
- Sator, rock band
- Nadja Brandt, writer and also appeared as an extra in Twilight
- Linda Carlsson, musician (also known as Miss Li)
- Tove Alexandersson, orienteering, ski-orienteering and skyrunning world champion
- Per Johansson, swimmer
