= VAD =

VAD may refer to:

== Physiology, medicine etc. ==
- Vascular dementia (VaD), dementia caused by problems in the supply of blood to the brain
- Vertebral artery dissection, the development of a flap-like tear in the vertebral artery
- Ventricular assist device, a mechanical circulatory device used to replace the function of a failing heart
- Vitamin A deficiency, a lack of vitamin A in humans
- Vincristine, Adriamycin (doxorubicin), Dexamethasone; a chemotherapy regimen used for multiple myeloma
- Voluntary assisted dying

== Other ==
- Voluntary Aid Detachment, a voluntary organisation providing field nursing services in the British Empire
- VÄD (vodka), an American vodka
- Voice activity detection, a technique in which the presence or absence of human speech is detected
- Voice-Activated Dialling, speech recognition to identify the destination for a telephone call in interactive voice response
- Velocity-Azimuth Display, a technique used to estimate vertical and horizontal components of atmospheric wind vectors from a radar

== See also ==
- Vad (disambiguation)
