= Patrizia Ferrara =

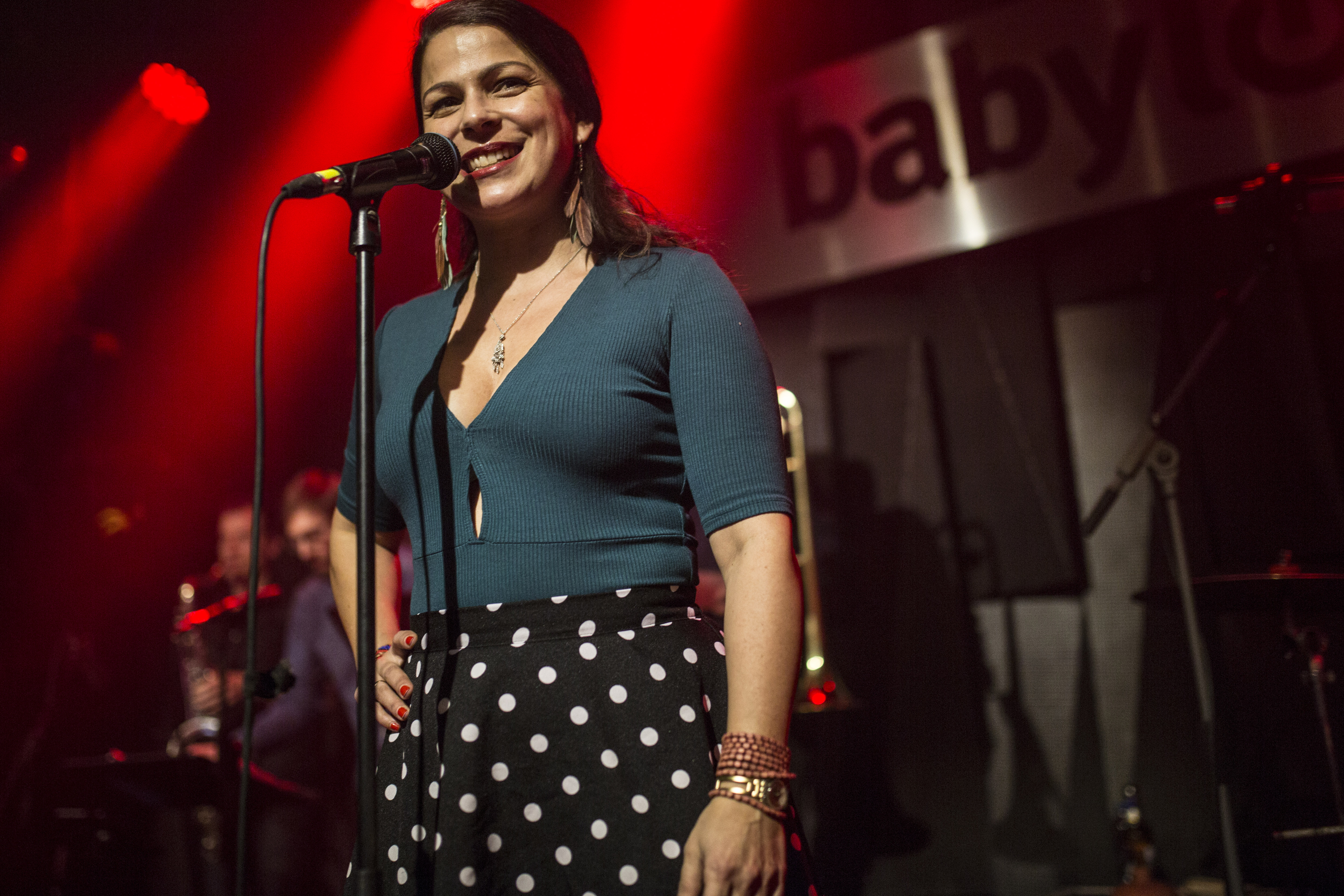

Background information
- Born: Patrizia Liliana Ferrara; February 20, 1977 (age 49)
- Genres: Jazz; Pop
- Occupations: Singer, songwriter
- Years active: 1997–present
- Website: www.patriziaferrara.com

Patrizia Ferrara is a jazz singer and songwriter.

== Early life ==
Patrizia Liliana Ferrara was born on February 20, 1977, as the younger child of two to her Austrian mother Edith and her Sicilian father Mario. Living in an Austrian town at the country's southern border, she was raised to the sound of Italian radio pop music of the 80s and the traditional songs of her relatives from Sicily and Naples. At sixteen, Ferrara moved to Vienna, where she began found work as an intern at the national radio concert hall (ORF Radiokulturhaus). This encouraged her to start writing her first songs, enroll in conservatory to formally study jazz, and begin performing on stage. Her early engagements include work with Austrian, African, Colombian, Turkish, Cuban artists, and work as a background vocalist for resident Brazilian singer Célia Mara. In 2003, she completed (with honors) her degree in jazz vocals and piano at the Gustav Mahler Conservatory in Vienna.

== Career ==
Ferrara began working as a jazz singer with American singer Dean Bowman and the American pianist Danny Grissett in 2004. The following year, she visited New York with Bowman and Grissett, and subsequently settled in Brooklyn. While in New York, she worked with local jazz musicians, performed for the Hospital Audiences Inc., a charity organizing concerts for sick and underprivileged children & adults, and gave public performances in Palestine. In 2008, she independently released her debut album Simple Things in New York City. Ferrara relocated to Vienna in 2012.

Since 2016, she has been the lead vocalist for Waldeck, co-writing several songs on Atlantic Ballroom, Grand Casino Hotel, and a number of EPs Waldeck has released since. The single "Rough Landing" was featured in Ferrero Roche's Golden Gallery Signature TV Commercial "Masterpiece". "One Of These Days“ received a nomination for the Austrian Music Award (category: Electronic/Dance) in 2021. The 2022 remix of the single "Quando Quando" by French DJ and producer The Avener reached second place on Apple Music Chart in France, number one on the Belgian iTunes Chart and number one on the Italian Radio Chart.

Ferrara has also been the featured singer for Joschi Schneeberger Gypsy Swingtet since 2020.

Throughout her career, Ferrara has performed, toured, and recorded with Waldeck, Lee Scratch Perry, Wladigeroff Bros, Martin Spitzer, Joschi Schneeberger, John Heard, Dean Bowman, Vinx, James Weidman, Danny Grissett, Gerald Schuller, Lonnie Plaxico, Kyle Eastwood, Célia Mara, DJ DSL, Marcos Vigio, Jorge Amorim, Sertab Erener (winner of the Eurovision Song Contest 2003), Jon Sass (Ray Anderson, Boston Symphony Brass, David Murry), Chester C. Washington (Earth, Wind and Fire), Rudi Wilfer†, Fred Eisler, DJ CUTEX, and the poet Christian Ide Hintze† for his 2004 pitch in the Austrian competition to participate in the European Song Contest 2005.

== Discography ==
- 2004 EP Link Love Ide Hintze feat. Patrizia Ferrara
- 2005 ALBUM Camena To The Fallen Fred Eisler feat. Patrizia Ferrara
- 2006 ALBUM Patrizia Ferrara/Edi Köhldorfer
- 2007 ALBUM Family Business Al Haca feat. Patrizia Ferrara
- 2008 ALBUM Bastardista Celia Mara
- 2008 ALBUM Simple Things Debut Album Patrizia Ferrara
- 2012 ALBUM Songbook One: Mike Scharf & Urban Dreamtime
- 2015 EP On Solid Ground
- 2018 EP Stay Put Waldeck feat. Patrizia Ferrara
- 2018 ALBUM Atlantic Ballroom Waldeck feat. Patrizia Ferrara
- 2018 SINGLE „Quando“ Waldeck feat. Patrizia Ferrara
- 2019 ALBUM Ide Ide Hintze feat. Patrizia Ferrara
- 2019 LIVE EP Live in Baden Patrizia Ferrara & Martin Spitzer
- 2019 SINGLE "One Of These Days" Waldeck feat. Patrizia Ferrara
- 2020 ALBUM Grand Casino Hotel Waldeck feat. Patrizia Ferrara
- 2020 SINGLE "Look at me Joe" Waldeck feat. Patrizia Ferrara
- 2020 SINGLE "Lady Bedford" Soul Goodman Remix
- 2020 SINGLE "Je t’aime beaucoup" Soul Goodman Remix
- 2020 SINGLE "Rough Landing" Soul Goodman Remix
- 2020 SINGLE "Come To Me" Patrizia Ferrara feat. Wolfgang Schmidt
- 2020 ALBUM One Florian Klinger
- 2021 EP It Might Be French Waldeck feat. Patrizia Ferrara
- 2021 SINGLE "Lady In Green" Surprise 20 Years Dope Noir feat. Patrizia Ferrara
- 2021 SINGLE "Memories" Waldeck feat. Patrizia Ferrara
- 2021 SINGLE "Speak To Me Darling" Waldeck feat. Patrizia Ferrara
- 2021 SINGLE "Dressed In Black" Patrizia Ferrara feat. Wolfgang Schmidt
- 2022 SINGLE "Quando Quando" The Avener & Waldeck feat. Patrizia Ferrara
- 2022 SINGLE "The Moon Above" Waldeck feat. Patrizia Ferrara
