= Valérie Sajdik =

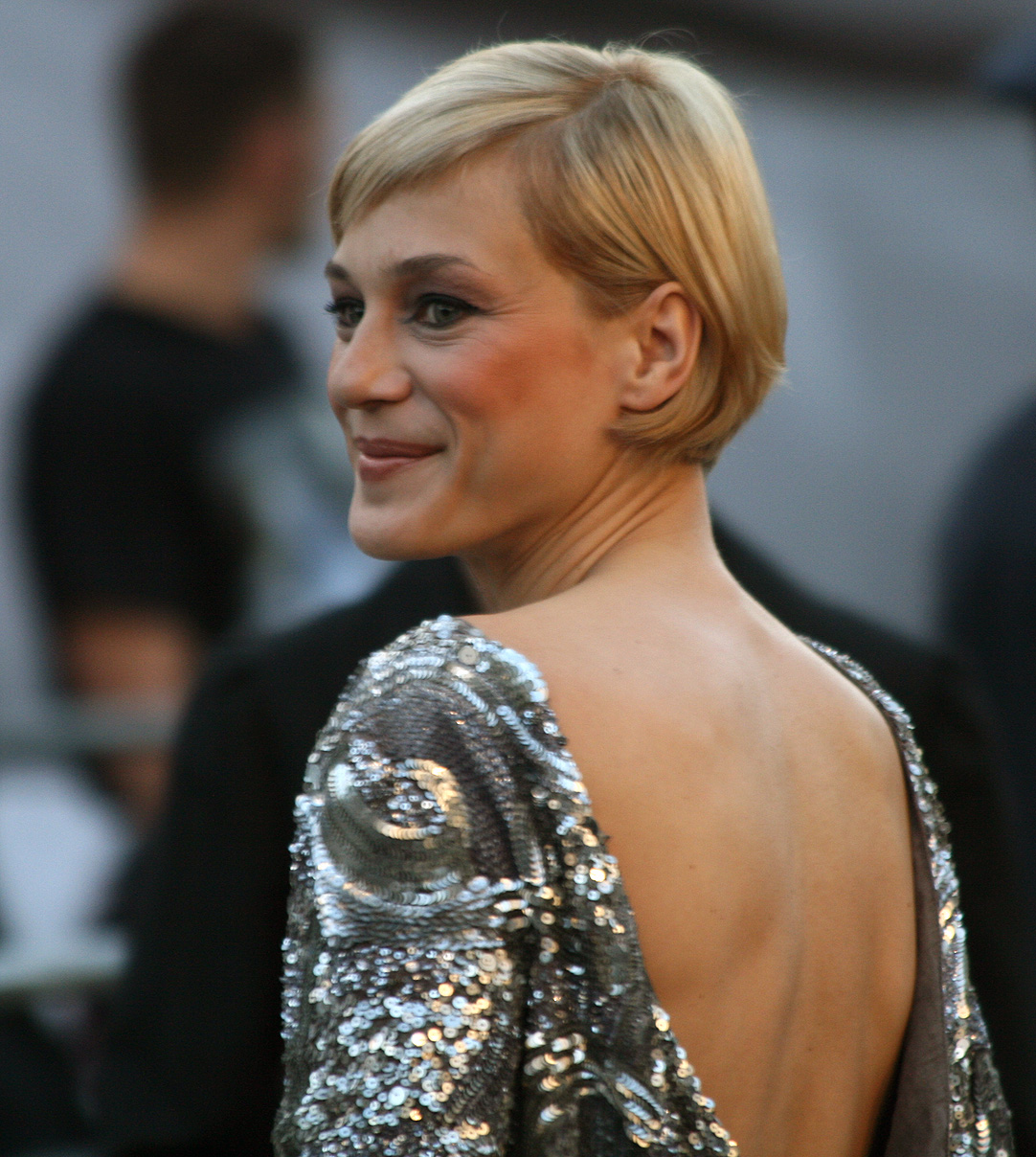
- Valérie at the Life Ball 2009, Rathaus, Vienna.

Background information
- Also known as: Valérie
- Born: Valérie Sajdik; 2 April 1978 (age 48)
- Origin: Vienna, Austria
- Genres: Pop, Dance, Electronic, Jazz, Contemporary R&B, Chanson
- Occupation: Singer
- Instrument: Vocals
- Years active: 1992–present
- Labels: Sony BMG (1992–present)
- Website: http://www.valeriesajdik.com

Valérie Sajdik is an Austrian pop singer, lyricist, host and actress.

Valerie Sajdik achieved her first chart successes with the girl band C-bra and became famous through lead singing in her band Saint Privat, which was very successful in the mid-2000s. She has since released three solo albums and tours internationally. She splits her time between living in Austria and France, and is tri-lingual (French, German, English). February 2010, she was invited to perform at the Vancouver Cultural Olympiads (Francophone Side) and performed on CBC Radio-Canada. She performed "Noyé" written by Vox and also her original "Une fois à la vie", both from her 2010 album, Ich Bin Du Bist. Her third solo album Les Nuits Blanches is a soundtrack of her sleepless ‚White Nights‘ featuring jazz chansons in various languages – French, English, German and Russian.

== Discography ==
=== Singles ===
- "Mädchen ~~sind doof~~" (2007)
- "Noch einmal" (2007)
- "Regen" (2007)

=== Albums ===
- Picknick (4 May 2007)
- Ich Bin Du Bist (19 March 2010)
- Les Nuits Blanches (October 2013)
