= Zeebee =

Austrian musician (born 1965)

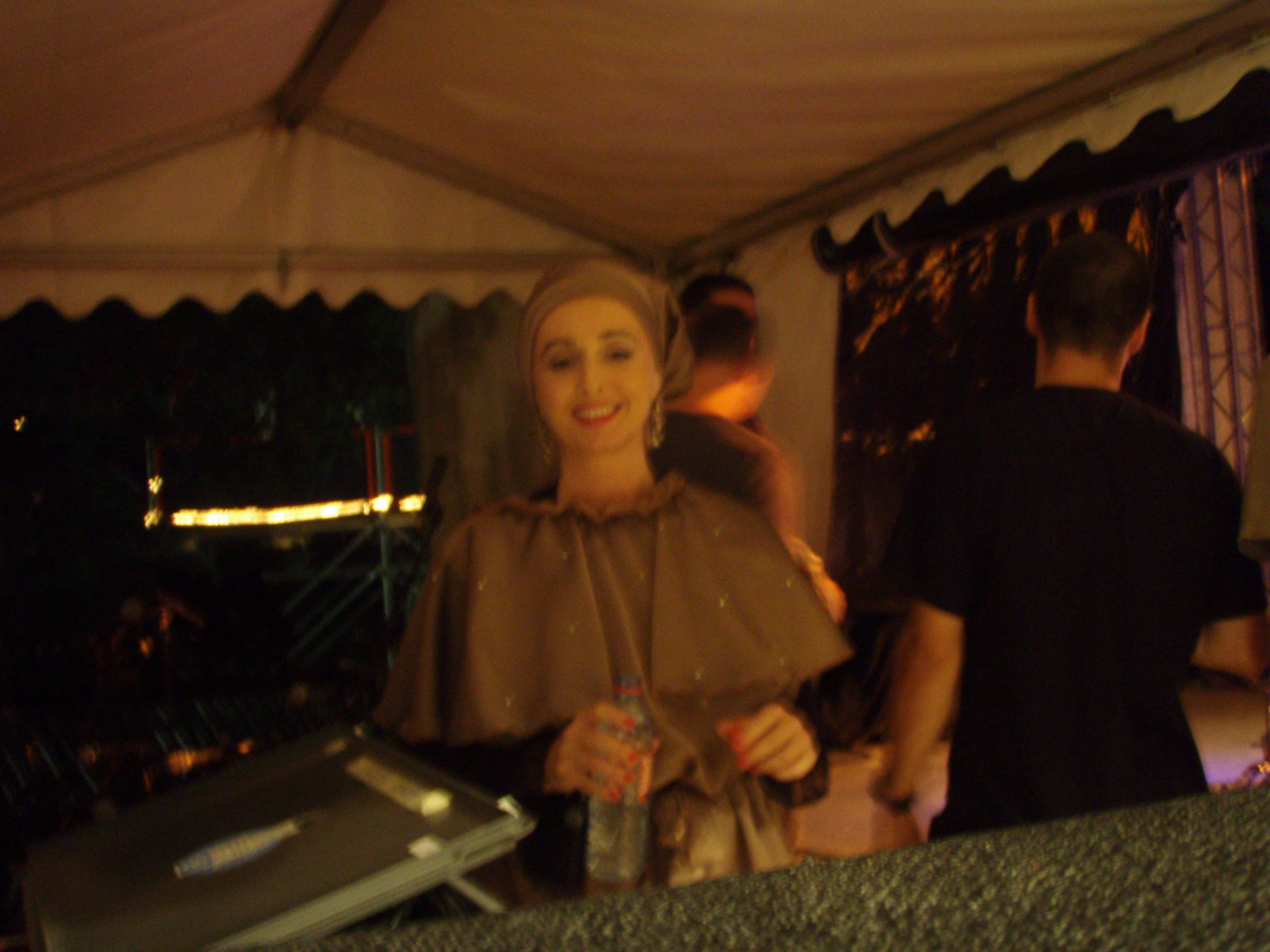
Zeebee backstage at the Montreux Jazz Festival in 2007

Zeebee, born 29 June 1965 in Aalen, Germany, real name Eva Engel, is an Austrian singer-songwriter, composer and music producer. She creates sounds and songs with a broad variety of styles, such as jazz, pop, electronica, acoustic music and classical music.

== Life and career ==
zeebee has been recording herself since the age of five, touring with Birmingham's Pigbag aged seventeen, releasing records on the Swiss label Off Course with her band D-Sire in the late 80's. Then starting to work as a ghostwriter, copywriting and taking flying lessons, raising two families and recording her musical ideas in her own studio in Austria. In 1999 zeebee (= "cb", relates to cyberbabe) started to work via the internet with diverse songwriters from all over the world. Since the release of her debut Chemistry on the Independent label Angelika Köhlermann in January 2004, zeebee received impressive press and radio reviews all over the world. Priorities, her second album, was written in 2004 and 2005 and released in February 2006 on Angelika Köhlermann/Monkey Music. In June 2007, zeebee co-authored and was featured on the album Ballroom Stories with Waldeck.

zeebee has toured as a solo-artist, with a band, and as singer of Klaus Waldeck's band. Her third solo-album Be My Sailor was released on 19 March 2010 by Dope Noir, Vienna.

== Discography ==
- 1987 D-Sire Moving Back And Forward, Label: Off Course
- 2003 Tender EP, Label: zeebeemusic
- 2004 Chemistry, Label: Angelika Köhlermann
- 2005 Cartoonboom Video EP, Label: Angelika Köhlermann
- 2006 Priorities, Label: Angelika Köhlermann/Monkey Music
- 2007 Ballroom Stories, Label: Dope Noir
- 2010 In Peace We Live EP, Label: Dope Noir
- 2010 Be My Sailor, Label: Dope Noir
