= Vad, Russia =

Vad (Russian: Вад) is the name of several rural localities (settlements and selos) in Russia:

- Vad, Komi Republic, a settlement in Yugydyag Rural-Type Settlement Administrative Territory of Ust-Kulomsky District of the Komi Republic
- Vad, Nizhny Novgorod Oblast, a selo in Vadsky Selsoviet of Vadsky District of Nizhny Novgorod Oblast
