= Sarclo =

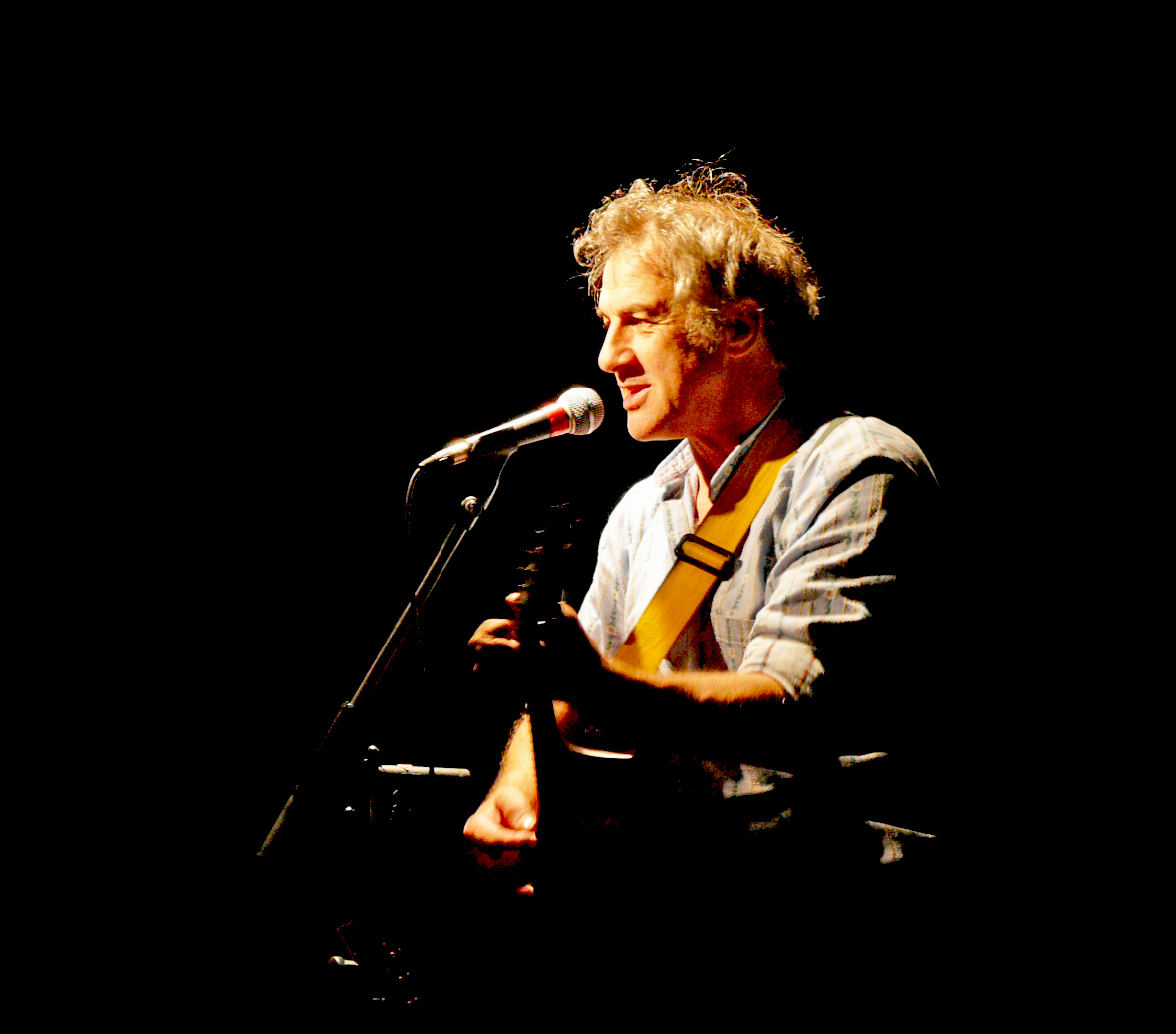
Michel de Senarclens

Michel de Senarclens (Paris, 17 June 1951) better known first as Sarcloret then today Sarclo is a French-born Swiss singer.

== Discography ==
1981 : Les plus grands succès de Sarcloret
1983 : Les premiers adieux de Sarcloret
1985 : Les pulls de ma poule
1987 : Les mots c'est beau
1990 : L'amour, comment procéder...
1992 : Une tristesse bleue et grise
1993 : SarcloSolo
1994 : T'es belle comme le petit Larousse à la page des avions (compilation)
1995 : L'amour de l'amour (et la chair à saucisse)
1997 : Michel et Denis jouent à Paris (enregistrement en public)
1998 : On leur doit des enfants si doux
2001 : L'Amour est un Commerce, mais la décharge est municipale
2003 : Des tendresses et des cochoncetés
2006 : Quinzaine du blanc chez les 3 Suisses avec Simon Gerber et Le bel Hubert (CD+DVD, enregistrement en public)
2006 : À tombeau ouvert (Chansons posthumes Vol. 1)
2008 : Les Trois Cloches (chansons de Jean Villard, dit Gilles, avec Michel Bühler et Gaspard Glaus, CD+DVD)
2009 : Un enterrement de 1re Classe (coffret intégral 12 CD)
2012 : Gueuler partout comme un putois
