= Atlantic Ballroom =

Studio album by Waldeck
- Released: 12 October 2018
- Genre: Electro swing, trip hop, electronic, latin, dub
- Label: Dope Noir Records
- Producer: Klaus Waldeck

Waldeck chronology
Gran Paradiso (2016)	Atlantic Ballroom (2018)

Singles from Atlantic Ballroom

Atlantic Ballroom is the fifth studio album by Waldeck, released in 2018. The album is latin and electro swing-influenced and was co-written by Waldeck and Patrizia Ferrara. It includes an English arrangement of "Illusions", which was featured in Italian on Waldeck's previous album, Gran Paradiso.

Professional ratings
Review scores
Source	Rating
Austrian Music Export	positive
Rolling Stone	4/5 stars

== Track listing ==
Atlantic Ballroom
No.	Title	Writer(s)	Length
1.	"Rough Landing" (feat. Patrizia Ferrara)	Waldeck, Patrizia Ferrara	3:37
2.	"Uno dos... Heisenberg"	Waldeck	2:31
3.	"Keep my Fire Burning" (feat. Joy Malcolm)	Joy Malcolm, Waldeck	1:58
4.	"Stay Put" (feat. Patrizia Ferrara)	Waldeck, Ferrara	2:37
5.	"Never Let You Go" (feat. Patrizia Ferrara)	Waldeck, Ferrara	3:13
6.	"Quicksand"	Waldeck, Ferrara	2:30
7.	"Illusions" (feat. Patrizia Ferrara)	Waldeck, Ferrara	3:27
8.	"Puerto Rico"	Waldeck	3:45
9.	"Quando" (feat. Patrizia Ferrara)	Jutta Niederstaetter, Waldeck	2:58
10.	"Bring my Baby Back Home" (feat. Big John)	John Whitfield, Waldeck	2:47
11.	"Waltz for Nathalie"	Waldeck	1:49
12.	"Freedom" (feat. Joy Malcolm)	Malcolm, Waldeck, Philipp Moosbrugger, Thomas Hechenberger	2:50

== Personnel ==
- Klaus Waldeck – performer, producer, composer, piano, keyboard, organ
- Buerowinkler – graphics
- Ditz Fejer - photography
