= Vad, Dalarna =

Vad
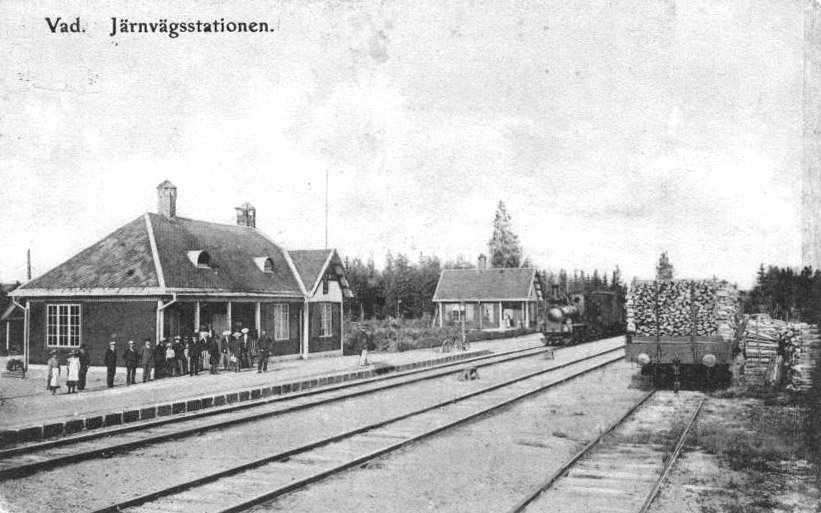
- Vad railway station in about 1907

- Location within Dalarna Location within Sweden
- Coordinates: 60°02′N 15°39′E
- Country: Sweden
- Province: Dalarna
- County: Dalarna County
- Municipality: Smedjebacken Municipality

Area
  - Total: 1.0 km^{2} (0.39 sq mi)

Population (31 December 2010)
  - Total: 308
  - Density: 308/km^{2} (800/sq mi)
- Time zone: UTC+1 (CET)
  - Summer (DST): UTC+2 (CEST)

Vad is a locality situated in Smedjebacken Municipality, Dalarna County, Sweden, with 308 inhabitants in 2010.
