= Eugen Cicero =

Romanian-German jazz pianist

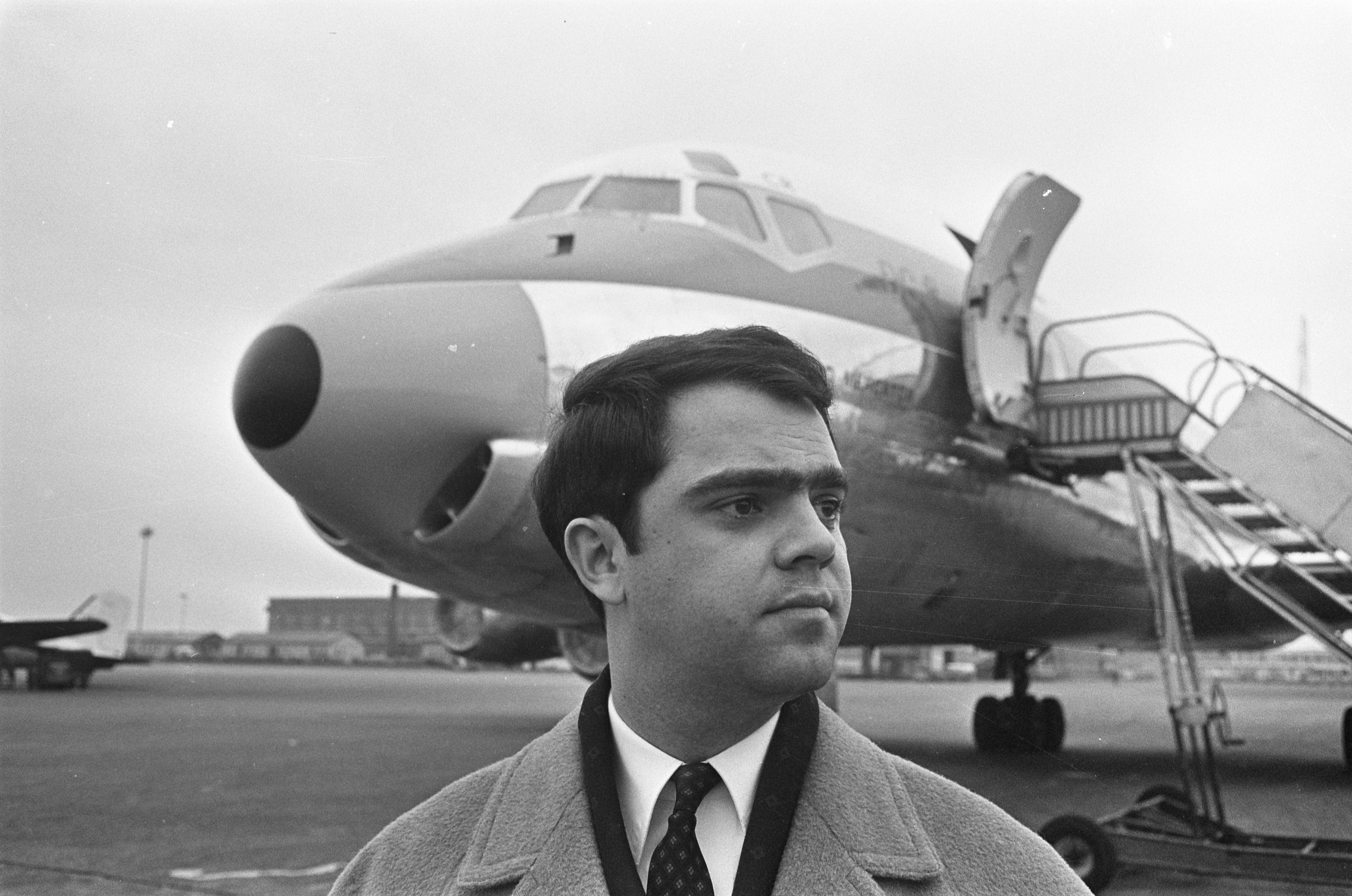
Eugen Cicero in North Holland (1967)

Eugen Cicero (born Eugen Ciceu; 27 June 1940 – 5 December 1997), nicknamed "Mister Golden Hands", was a Romanian-German jazz pianist who performed in the mixed classical-swing style.

== Biography ==
Born in Vad, Romania, to Teodor and Livia Ciceu, an Orthodox priest and professional singer respectively, he began to play the piano at the age of four. Aged six, he performed a Mozart piano concerto with the symphony orchestra of Cluj. Although he graduated from the National Conservatory in Bucharest, he abandoned a career as a conventional concert pianist and established his style between classical and jazz piano, introducing swing harmonies into baroque, classical and romantic compositions, often as spontaneous improvisations.

In 1962, while touring East Berlin, Cicero fled to West Berlin. He spent the next two years in Switzerland, where he joined the "Kindli" orchestra of Joe Schmid. After returning to Germany, Cicero produced more than 70 recordings, some of them with the Berlin and Munich Philharmonic orchestras. He had numerous appearances on German TV and enjoyed much success while touring Japan. In 1976 he was awarded the Deutscher Schallplattenpreis for his interpretations of Franz Schubert.

In 1982, Cicero moved to Switzerland, where he died in Zürich in 1997 from a cerebral apoplexy, aged 57. His younger brother Adrian Cicero is a jazz instrumentalist. His son Roger Cicero (1970–2016) was a renowned jazz singer.

== Discography ==
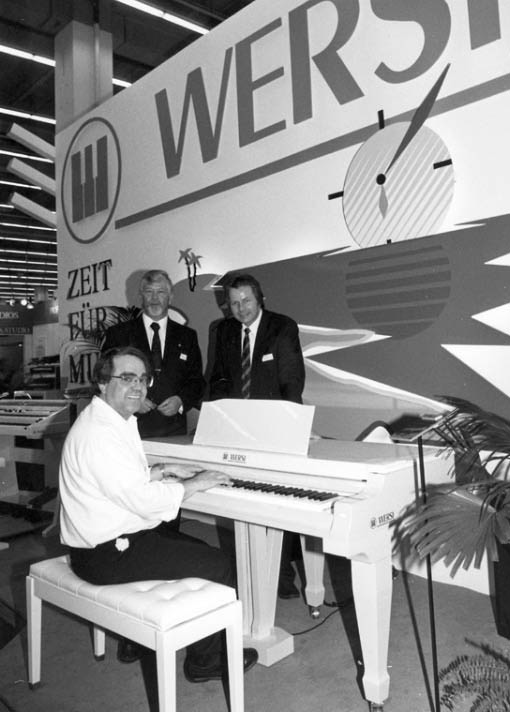
Eugen Cicero

- Rokoko Jazz (SABA, 1965)
- In Town (SABA, 1965)
- Cicero's Chopin (SABA, 1966)
- Swinging Tschaikowsky (SABA, 1966)
- Romantic Swing (SABA, 1968)
- Eugen Cicero Quintet (Metronome, 1968)
- Balkan Rhapsody (MPS, 1970)
- Und Jetzt Spielt (HOR ZU, 1970)
- Klavierspielereien (MPS, 1971)
- Live at the Berlin Philharmonie (Intercord, 1972)
- My Lyrics (Columbia, 1972)
- Swinging Classics (MPS, 1972)
- Mr. Golden Hands Vol. 2 (Intercord, 1973)
- Cicero in London (Intercord, 1974)
- Klassik Modern (Sudwestfunk, 1974)
- Plays Schubert (Intercord, 1975)
- Piano Solo (Intercord, 1976)
- Mr. Golden Hands Vol. 1 (Intercord, 1976)
- Swingin' Classic (MPS, 1976)
- Eugen Cicero Chopin Festival (BBC, 1976)
- Concierto de Aranjuez (Overseas, 1977)
- Piano Reflections (Overseas, 1977)
- For My Friends (Intercord, 1977)
- Marching the Classics: Love of Three Oranges March (Barclay, 1978)
- In Concert (Intercord, 1978)
- Presenting Eugen Cicero (MPS, 1978)
- Balladen (Intercord, 1979)
- Nice to Meet You with Toots Thielemans (Intercord, 1980)
- Romantic Swing Piano (MPS, 1980)
- Eugen Cicero (Europa, 1980)
- Swinging Classics (Overseas, 1982)
- Spring Song (Timeless, 1983)
- Don't Stop My Dreams (Denon, 1984)
- Jazz Bach (Timeless, 1985)
- Love's Dream (Elite Special, 1985)
- Traumnoten (Intersound, 1985)
- Classics in Rhythm (MPS, 1986)
- Rokoko Jazz II (Baystate, 1987)
- Berlin Reunion (Monopol, 1987)
- Whisper from Eternity (Columbia, 1988)
- Rococo Jazz 2 (Timeless, 1992)
- Cicero Jazz (Electrecord, 1993)
- Swinging Piano Classics (In+Out, 1996)
- Jazz Meets Popular Music (ZYX/Bob Media, 2007)
- Swing with Cicero (Xclu, 2010)
