= Kadebostany =

Swiss electronic band

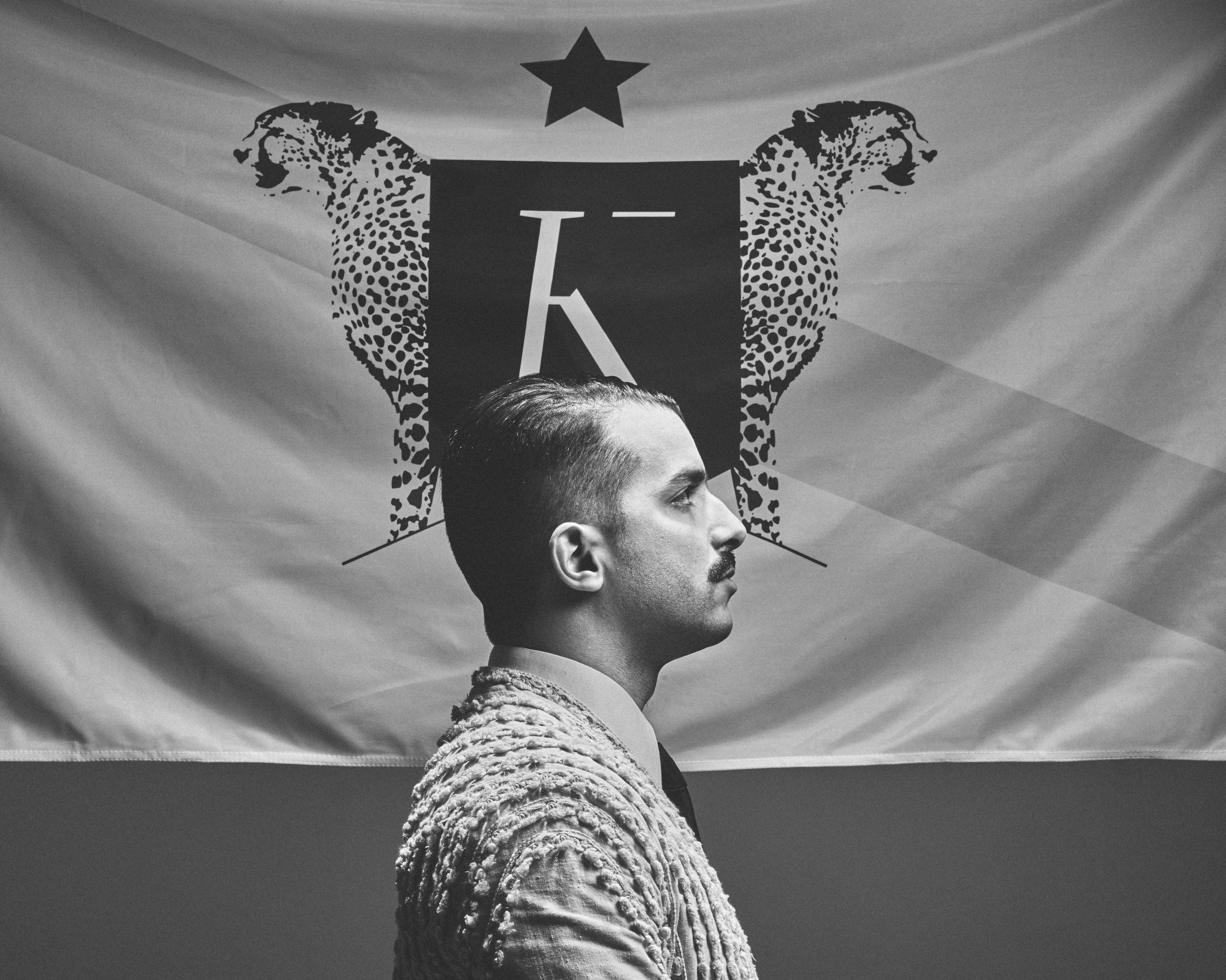

Background information
- Origin: Switzerland
- Years active: 2008–present
- Labels: Republic of Kadebostany; NSK; Mental Groove
- Members: Guillaume de Kadebostany; Naile Ibraimova; Gabriella Laberge; Ross Butcher; Marc Veuthey
- Past members: Amina Cadelli; Jérôme Léonard; Kristina Yakovleva; Vassiliki Megkla; Célia Serrao; Fang The Great
- Website: kadebostany.com

Kadebostany (stylized in all caps) is a Swiss electronic band formed by producer Guillaume de Kadebostany, also known as President Kadebostan (real name Guillaume Bozonnet). They achieved chart success with their song "Castle in the Snow".

== Members ==
- Guillaume de Kadebostany – founder, composer, producer, samples
- Naile Ibraimova (VAMBRA) - vocals (from 2025)
- Gabriella Laberge - vocals, violin (from 2025)
- Marc Veuthey – drums
- Ross Butcher – trombone

=== Former members ===
- Amina Cadelli (Flèche Love) – vocals, lyrics (2012–2015)
- Jérôme Léonard – bass and guitar (2011–2014)
- Kristina Yakovleva (Saint Stacy) – vocals, guitar, bass (2016–2020)
- Vassiliki Megkla (VASSIŁINA) - vocals (2023-2025)
- Célia Serrao (POSEÏDONA) – vocals, guitar (2020-2025)
- Fang The Great - vocals

== Discography ==
=== Albums ===
Year	Album	Peak positions		
Year	Album	SWI	BEL (Wa)	FRA
2011	The National Fanfare of Kadebostany	—	—	—
2013	Pop Collection	55	153	—
2017	Monumental – Chapter I	—	—	—
2018	Monumental	30	—	140

=== Singles ===
Year	Single	Peak positions		
Year	Single	BEL (Fl)	BEL (Wa)	FR
2015	"Castle in the Snow" (with the Avener)	54* (Ultratip)	3	15
2018	"Save Me"	—	—	—

*Did not reach the Belgian Ultratop 50 chart, but charted on the Ultratip chart.

Others

- "Walking with a Ghost" (July 2012)
- "Crazy in Love" (July 2013)
- "Jolan" (October 2013)
- "Palabras" (February 2014)
- "Frozen to Death" (May 2016)
- "Mind If I Stay" (June 2017)
