= Proisy =

- Commune
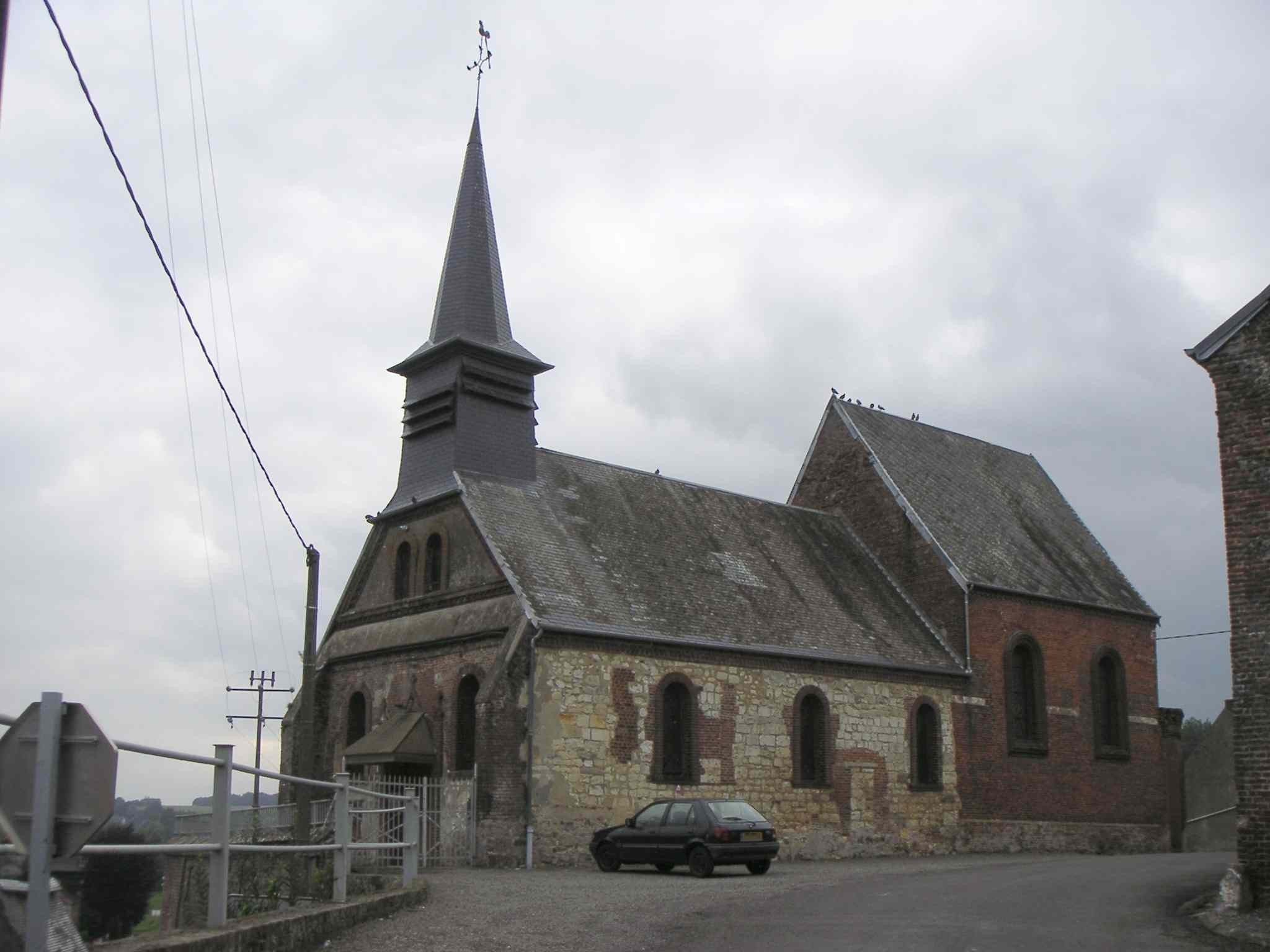
- The church of Proisy

- Coat of arms
- Location of Proisy
- Location within France Location within Hauts-de-France
- Coordinates: 49°53′55″N 3°44′27″E
- Country: France
- Region: Hauts-de-France
- Department: Aisne
- Arrondissement: Vervins
- Canton: Guise

Government
  - Mayor (2026–32): Stéphanie Macon
- Area^{1}: 5.2 km^{2} (2.0 sq mi)
- Elevation: 150 m (490 ft)
- Highest elevation: 179 m (587 ft)
- Lowest elevation: 105 m (344 ft)
- Population (2023): 276
  - Density: 53/km^{2} (140/sq mi)
- Time zone: UTC+01:00 (CET)
  - Summer (DST): UTC+02:00 (CEST)
- INSEE/Postal code: 02624 /02120
- ^{1} French Land Register data, which excludes lakes, ponds, glaciers > 1 km^{2} (0.386 sq mi or 247 acres) and river estuaries.

Proisy (French pronunciation: [pʁwazi], before 1962: Proizy) is a commune in the Aisne department in Hauts-de-France in northern France.

== Population ==
Historical population
Year	Pop.	±% p.a.
1968	477	—
1975	370	−3.56%
1982	363	−0.27%
1990	309	−1.99%
1999	293	−0.59%
2007	309	+0.67%
2012	325	+1.01%
2017	274	−3.36%
2023	276	+0.12%
Source: INSEE

== See also ==
- Communes of the Aisne department
