= Söderbärke =

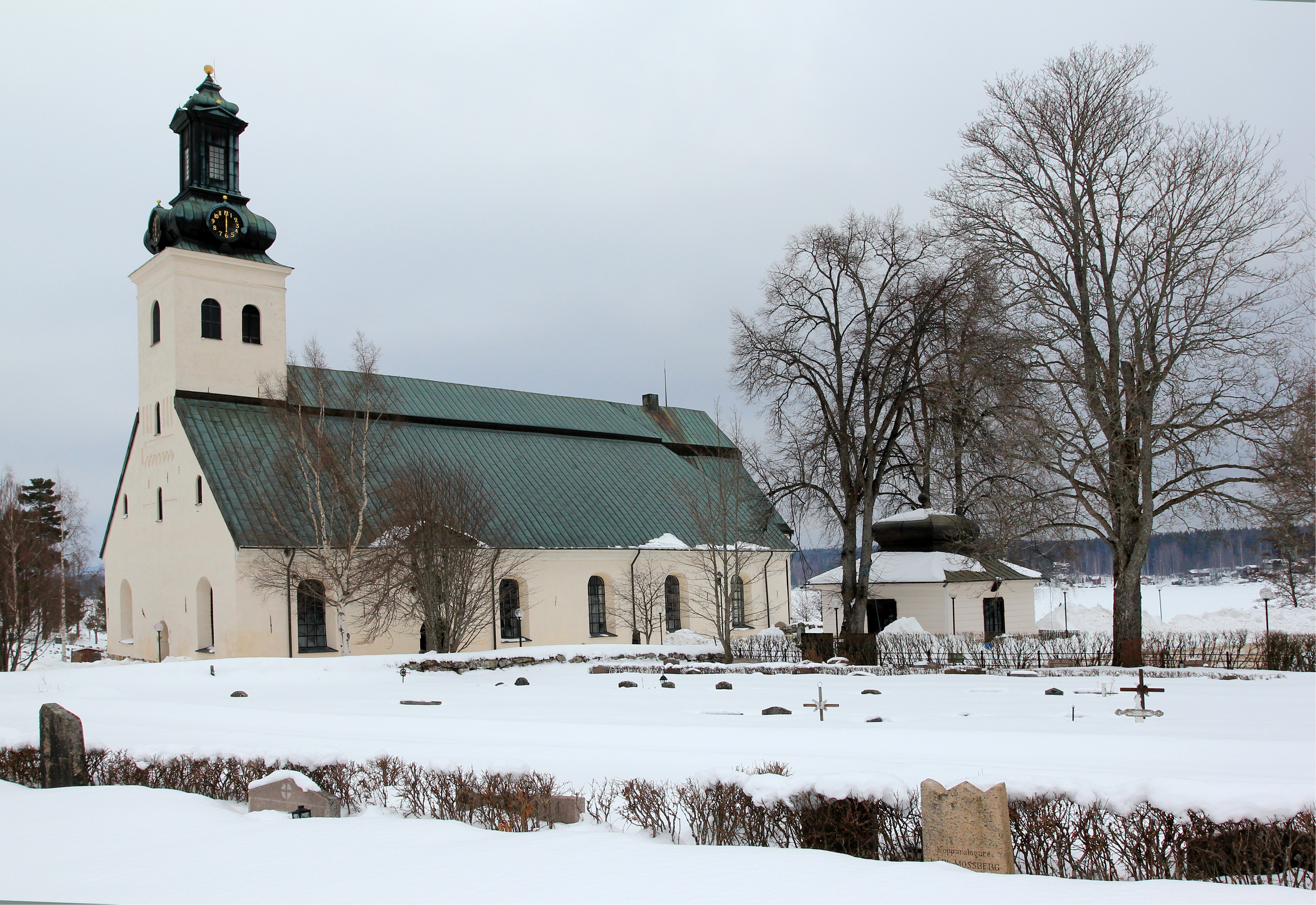
- Söderbärke church

- Coat of arms

- Location within Dalarna Location within Sweden
- Coordinates: 60°04′N 15°33′E
- Country: Sweden
- Province: Dalarna
- County: Dalarna County
- Municipality: Smedjebacken Municipality

Area
  - Total: 2.08 km^{2} (0.80 sq mi)

Population (31 December 2010)
  - Total: 924
  - Density: 444/km^{2} (1,150/sq mi)
- Time zone: UTC+1 (CET)
  - Summer (DST): UTC+2 (CEST)

Söderbärke is a locality in Smedjebacken Municipality, Dalarna County, Sweden, with 924 inhabitants in 2010.

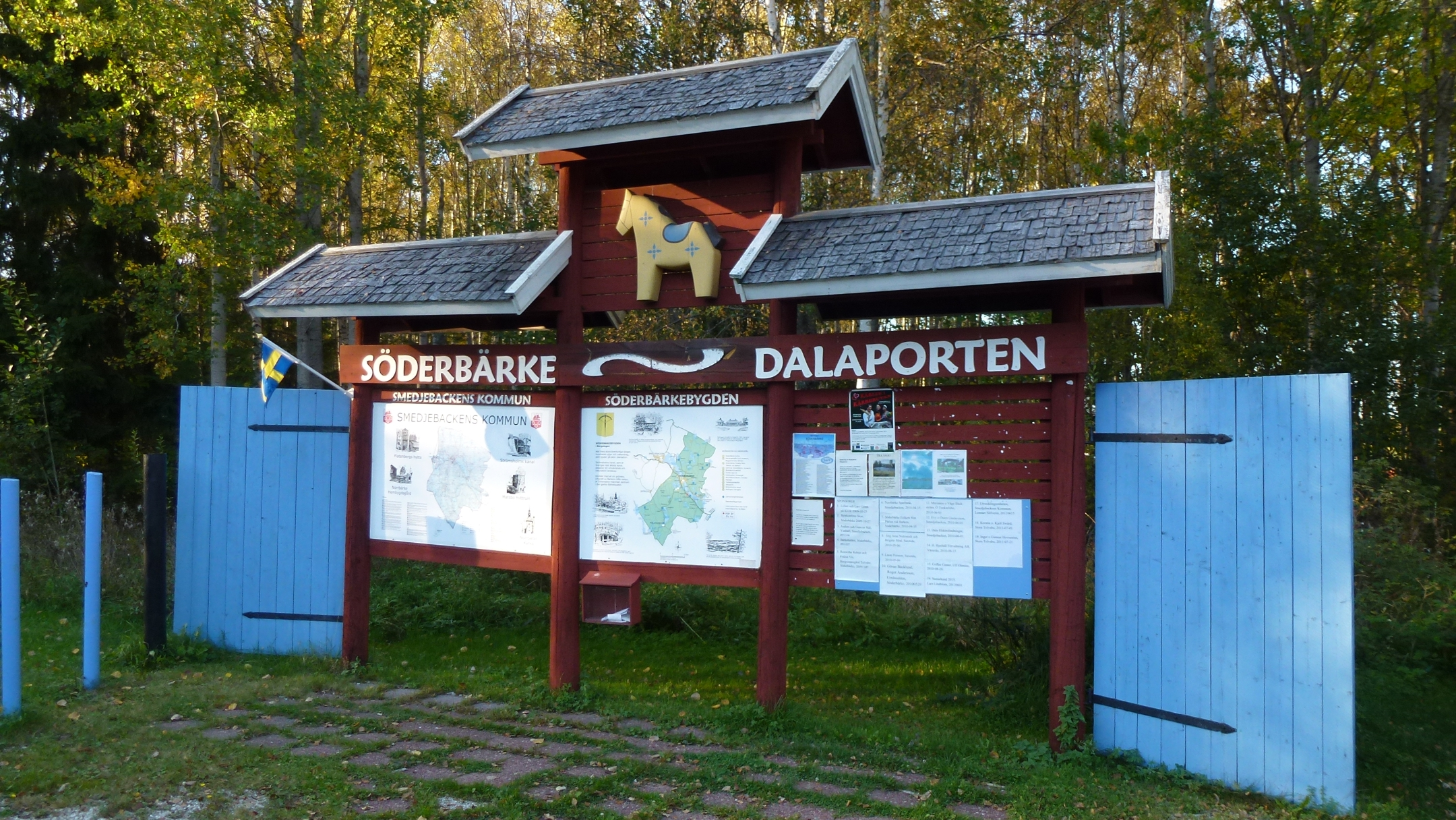
Information table at the entrance to Söderbärke
