= We Go Home =

Studio album by Adam Cohen
- Released: September 15, 2014
- Recorded: 2013
- Studio: Hydra, Greece; Montreal, Quebec
- Length: 36:56
- Label: Cooking Vinyl
- Producer: Michael Chaves

Adam Cohen chronology
Like a Man (2012)	We Go Home (2014)

Professional ratings
Review scores
Source	Rating
The Observer	3/5 stars
Hot Press	2.5/5
The Irish Times	3/5 stars
PressPlay	3/5 stars
Renowned for Sound	3/5 stars

We Go Home is the fourth studio album by Canadian musician Adam Cohen, released on September 15, 2014, through Cooking Vinyl.

== Track listing ==
1. "Song of Me and You" – 3:13
2. "Too Real" – 4:20
3. "We Go Home" – 3:13
4. "Put Your Bags Down" – 3:26
5. "So Much to Learn" – 3:27
6. "Uniform" – 2:59
7. "Love Is" – 2:38
8. "What Kind of Woman" – 3:50
9. "Fall Apart" – 3:56
10. "Swear I Was There" – 4:25
11. "Boats" – 1:29

Bonus tracks on deluxe edition

12. "Sun" – 3:17
13. "Don't Crack" – 2:48

== Personnel ==
- Adam Cohen – guitar, vocals
- Mai Bloomfield – vocals, cello, papoose
- Geneviève Clermont – violin
- Marie-Pierre Lecault – violin
- Stéphanie Collerette – cello
- Michael Chaves (as Don Miguel) – guitar, keyboards, producer
- Al Vermue – engineer
- Oli Scoble – assistant engineer
- Bill Bottrell – mixing
- Jeff Gartenbaum – assistant mixing

== Charts ==
Chart performance for We Go Home
Chart (2014)	Peak position
Belgian Albums (Ultratop Flanders)	37
Belgian Albums (Ultratop Wallonia)	93
Canadian Albums (Billboard)	6
French Albums (SNEP)	178
