= Gran Paradiso (album) =

Studio album by Waldeck
- Released: 15 July 2016
- Genre: Trip hop, Electronic, reggae, dub
- Label: Dope Noir Records
- Producer: Klaus Waldeck

Waldeck chronology
Ballroom Stories (2007)	Gran Paradiso (2016)	Atlantic Ballroom (2018)

Singles from Gran Paradiso

Gran Paradiso is the fourth studio album by Waldeck, released in 2016. Gran Paradiso was co-written by Viennese singer Heidi Moussa-Benamma (la Heidi), who is featured on eight of the thirteen tracks. The album combines elements of trip hop, downtempo, and reggae. It is Waldeck's first major release since 2007's Ballroom Stories.

Professional ratings
Review scores
Source	Rating
Austrian Music Export	positive

== Track listing ==
Gran Paradiso
No.	Title	Writer(s)	Length
1.	"Sereneta Part II"	Waldeck	1:22
2.	"Shala-Lala-La"	Waldeck, La Heidi	3:15
3.	"Chico"	Waldeck, La Heidi	2:39
4.	"Rio Grande"	Waldeck	3:18
5.	"Illusione"	Waldeck, La Heidi	3:29
6.	"Senorita Rodeo"	Waldeck	3:30
7.	"Western Saloon – Cartoon"	Waldeck, Mud	3:24
8.	"Una Promessa"	Waldeck, La Heidi	2:52
9.	"Bello Ciao"	Waldeck, La Heidi	3:26
10.	"Una Volta"	Waldeck, La Heidi	2:26
11.	"Brahms Lonely Mariachi"	Bob;Mort	2:51
12.	"Get on Uppa"	Waldeck, La Heidi	3:43
13.	"Rock & Rollee"	Waldeck, La Heidi	3:02

== Personnel ==
- La Heidi – vocals, composer
- Klaus Waldeck – performer, producer, composer
- Milos Todorovski – accordion
- Martin Heinzle – bass
- P. Mossbrugger – bass
- Rüdiger Kostron – bass
- Hermann Aigner – drums
- Shayan Fathi – drums
- Buerowinkler – graphics
- Thomas Hechenberger – guitar
- Christian Santera – harmonica
- Funky Horn Brothers – horns
- Albin Paulus – Jew's Harp
- Gerald Selig – saxophone
- Clemens Hofer – trombone
- Joschi Ötti – trumpet
- Josef Fuchsberger – trumpet
- Dorothee Badent – violin, viola
