= Ballroom Stories =

Studio album by Waldeck
- Released: June 25, 2007
- Recorded: 2005–2007
- Genre: Trip hop, electronic
- Label: Dope Noir Records
- Producer: Klaus Waldeck

Waldeck chronology
Make My Day – EP (2006)	Ballroom Stories (2007)	Gran Paradiso (2016)

Ballroom Stories is a studio album by Waldeck released in 2007. Ballroom Stories is the first album that included collaboration with Austrian musician Zeebee. The album features a more trip hop-oriented sound than his previous albums.

== Critical reception ==
Professional ratings
Review scores
Source	Rating
AllMusic	positive

The album was met with generally positive reviews. Mark Deming from AllMusic said, "Ballroom Stories is electronic dance music designed to evoke the sounds and moods of the 1920s, when glamour and intrigue walked hand in hand at dance halls and speakeasies."

== Track listing ==
Ballroom Stories
No.	Title	Writer(s)	Length
1.	"Make My Day"	Waldeck;Malcolm	2:49
2.	"Jerry Weintraub"		3:08
3.	"Memories"	Zeebee;Waldeck	3:53
4.	"Addicted"	Zeebee;Waldeck	3:56
5.	"So Black & Blue"	P. Moosbrugger;Waldeck	3:28
6.	"Midsummer Night Blue"	Zeebee;Waldeck	4:37
7.	"Why Did We Fire the Gun?"	Zeebee; Waldeck	5:35
8.	"Dope Noir"		4:13
9.	"Get Up...Carmen"		4:00
10.	"Bei Mir Bist du Schön (Dub)"	Jacobs;Cahn;Chaplin;Secunda	4:09
11.	"Our Day Will Come"	Bob Garson;Mort Hilliard	4:48

== Personnel ==
- Brian Amos – vocals
- Thomas Berghammer – trumpet
- Mort Garson – composer
- Bob Hilliard – composer
- Peter Huber – trumpet
- Albin Janoska – piano
- Joy Malcolm – vocals
- Ilse Riedler – clarinet
- Klaus Waldeck – performer, producer, composer
- Zeebee – composer
