= Adam Cohen (musician) =

Canadian singer-songwriter

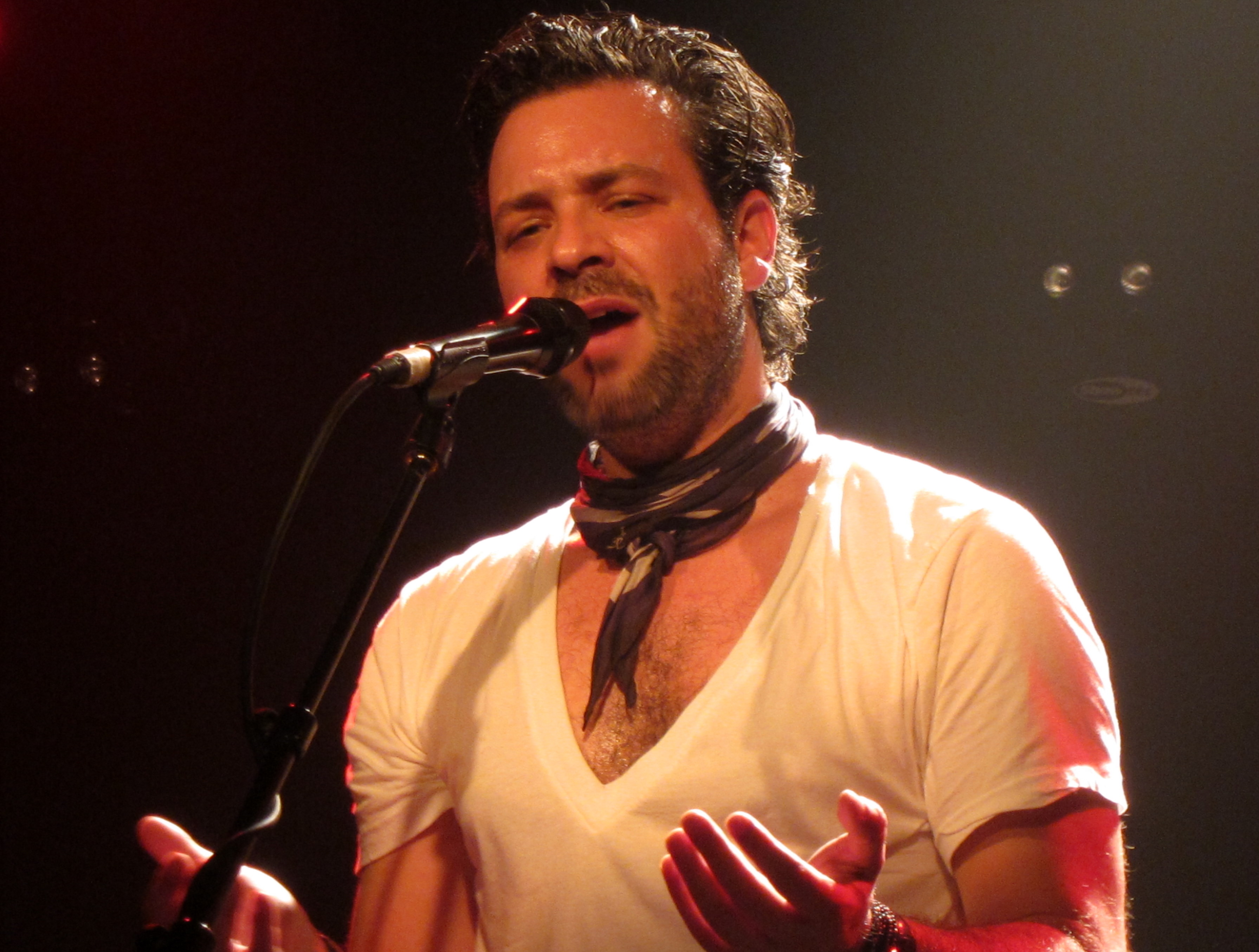

Background information
- Born: September 18, 1972 (age 54); Montreal, Quebec, Canada
- Genre: Rock
- Occupation: Singer-songwriter
- Instruments: Vocals, guitar, keyboards
- Formerly of: Low Millions

Adam Cohen (born September 18, 1972) is a Canadian singer-songwriter. As a recording artist, he has released four major label albums, three in English and one in French. His most recent album, We Go Home, was released on September 15, 2014. Currently residing in Los Angeles, he was also lead vocalist of the pop rock band Low Millions from California.

He is the son of singer-songwriter Leonard Cohen, and also the ambassador of the Cohen family to art exhibits of Leonard Cohen Art, attending and doing press and media for openings around the world for his father's paintings and drawings.

His son Cassius Cohen is a bass player who performs with him onstage.

== Early life ==
Cohen was born September 18, 1972, in Montreal, but spent many years of his childhood living with his American expat mother, Suzanne Elrod, in Paris and in the south of France, after his parents separated. He spent parts of his childhood on the Greek island Hydra, in Greenwich Village, and in Los Angeles. Though he is attached to different parts of the world, he considers Greece to be his home. He taught himself to play guitar, drums and piano by age 12. He worked as a roadie in 1990, and studied international relations at Syracuse University. He moved to Los Angeles in 1996 to focus on his music career, after having lived and played in bands in New York City. The demo that led to his signing his first record deal created a bidding war between Maverick, Capitol Records and Sony, Adam (then 26 years old) eventually signing with the same label as his father, Columbia Records.

== Career ==
He was signed by Columbia Records in 1997. He achieved some success as a songwriter for other artists. He co-wrote "Lullaby in Blue", a song about a woman who gave up a child for adoption. Bette Midler recorded it for her album Bathhouse Betty and described it as her favorite on the album: "I've never heard a pop song about a person who gives their child up and is missing the child... The first time I heard that song, I burst into tears."

His 1998 debut album was well regarded critically—Stephen Holden of The New York Times called it "grimly perceptive" and "a promising beginning". The album went on to produce a radio hit "Cry Ophelia" which was well received and charted (Canadian radio charts in particular) but the project as a whole was not a big commercial success.

He decided to focus on French-language material and was signed to Capitol Records Canada, which released Mélancolista. Featured on this French language record is a popular duet with famous French actress Virginie Ledoyen (the song is entitled "Happiness", evoking the well known duet between Serge Gainsbourg and Brigitte Bardot).

Representatives from Capitol inquired about English-language material, and soon after being signed to a deal for his French album, Adam traveled to New York to meet with executives from Manhattan Records. He was signed to a deal after 15 minutes of a solo acoustic performance; the deal led to the Low Millions project.

Low Millions went on to have two charting hit songs at AAA radio in North America, with the songs "Eleanor" and "Statue".

Regarding the influence from his poet-balladeer father, Cohen has said, "He's tremendously helpful. Forget that I am his son. I was tutored in lyric-writing by Leonard Cohen and I had his sensibilities to draw upon. And I'm not just talking genetically. I could literally talk to the cat and he could lean over my notebook and point to a couple of phrases and say, 'These are strong, these are weak.' How can I consider myself anything but incredibly fortunate." In addition to his father, he has said that his musical influences include Randy Newman, Serge Gainsbourg, Prince, and U2. He characterized his French-language work as musically distinct from his English recordings, the former being more "sumptuous and cinematic", and sounding like "Sade—if she were a Frenchman". In 2009, Adam recorded a cover of his father's song "Take This Waltz", which appeared on the benefit album War Child Presents Heroes.

In 2007, Cohen effectively quit the music business after deep disillusionment set in. Despite his having a few modest hits at radio and opportunities to tour the world, fame and fortune failed to materialize with the release of Cohen's three major-label albums, 1998's self-titled debut, 2004's French-language Mélancolista, and 2004's Ex-Girlfriends, which Cohen made with his band, Low Millions. "I was chasing a sound that was not entirely my own," Cohen says of his pop-rock efforts. "My goal wasn't to be good, my goal was to be successful."

He produced, and performed on, his father's 2016 album You Want It Darker, and produced and compiled a posthumous album of his father's work, the 2019 album Thanks for the Dance.

In 2026 at the PEOPLE festival in Berlin, Cohen announced that he was producing a 10-year anniversary show to commemorate the death of his father. He selected indie musicians to cover his father's songs at the festival and then toured with some of the musicians in Toronto and Montreal in November. Collaborators included Ben Howard, Leif Vollebekk, Pomme, Victoria Canal, and the Irish folk group Ye Ye Vagabonds. His son Cassius Cohen premiered on bass.

== Discography ==
=== Albums ===
==== Solo ====
Album and details	Peak positions				Certification
Album and details	CAN	BEL (Fl)	BEL (Wa)	FR	Certification
Adam Cohen: Release date: July 28, 1998; Label: Columbia	–	–	–	–	
Mélancolista: Release date: June 7, 2004; Label: Capitol / EMI (Canada)	–	–	–	–	
Like a Man: Release date: April 3, 2012; Label: Rezolute Music / EMI (Canada) Cooking Vinyl		–	–	–	CANADA: Gold
We Go Home: Release date: September 15, 2014; Label: Rezolute Music / Cooking Vinyl	6	37	93	178	

==== With Low Millions ====
- Ex-Girlfriends (2004, Manhattan Records)

=== Singles ===
==== Solo ====
- "Cry Ophelia" from Adam Cohen
- "Tell Me Everything" from Adam Cohen
- "Happiness" from Mélancolista (featuring Virginie Ledoyen)
- "What Other Guy" from Like a Man
- "Like A Man" from Like a Man
- "Sweet Dominique" from Like a Man
- "The Stranger" from Like a Man
- "We Go Home" from We Go Home
- "Love Is" from We Go Home

==== Low Millions ====
- "Eleanor" from Ex-Girlfriends
- "Statue" from Ex-Girlfriends
