= Vad, Cluj =

Vad
- Commune
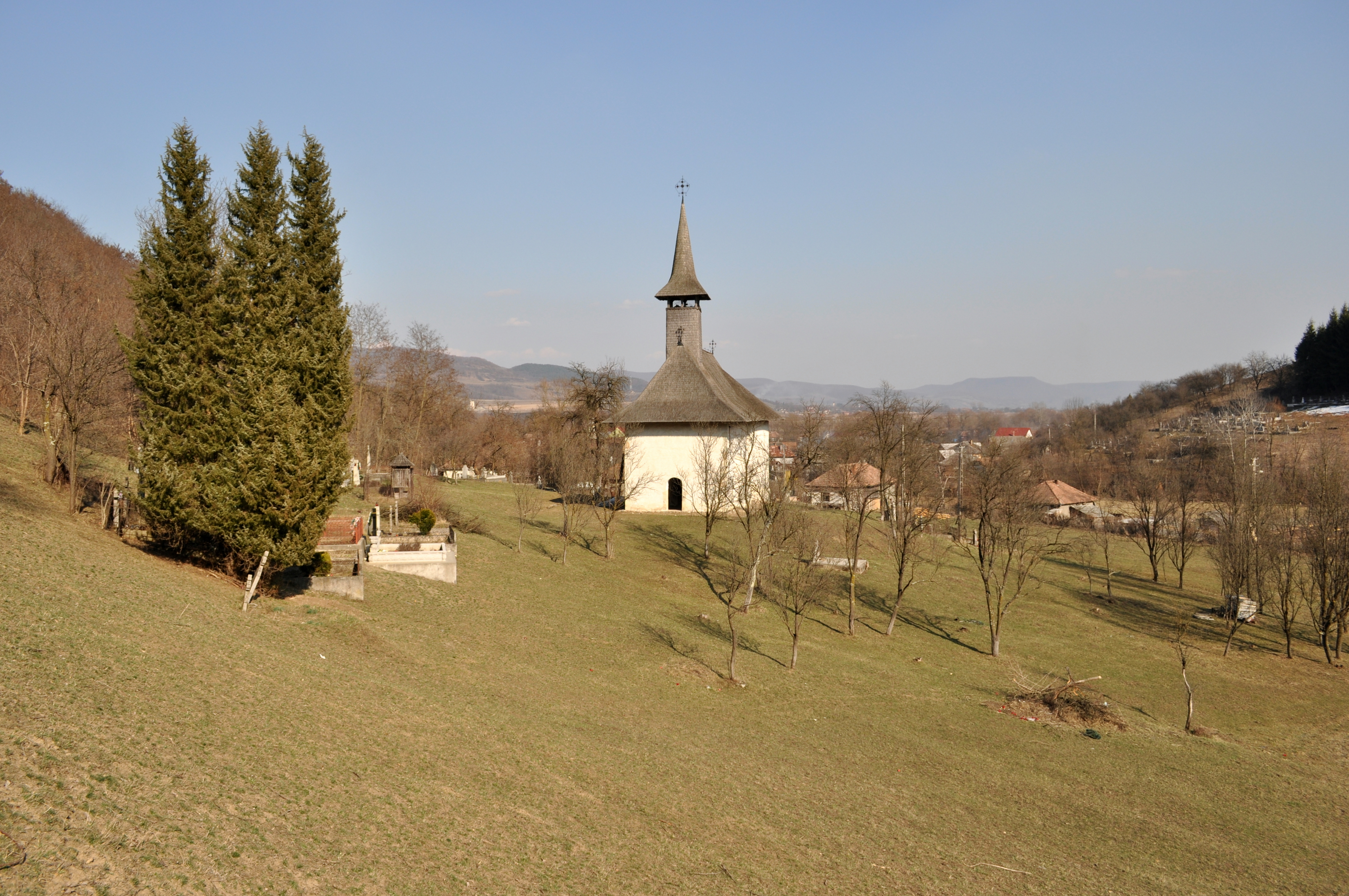
- Assumption Church in Vad

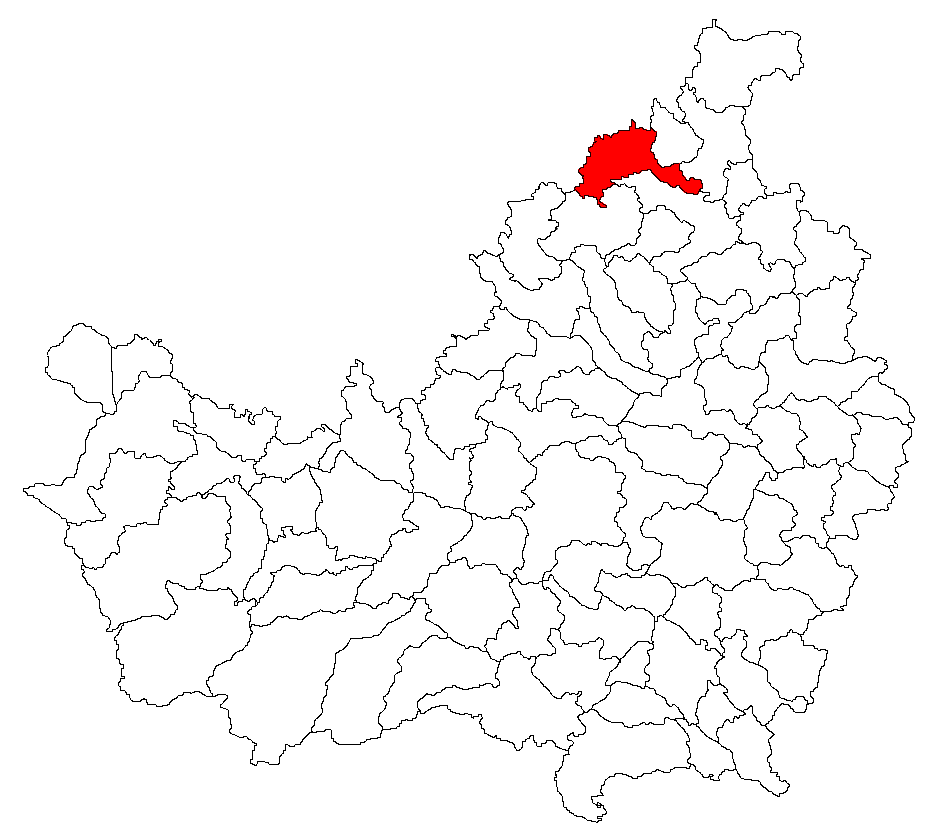
- Location in Cluj County

- Location in Romania
- Coordinates: 47°13′9.84″N 23°44′43.44″E
- Country: Romania
- County: Cluj
- Subdivisions: Bogata de Jos, Bogata de Sus, Calna, Cetan, Curtuiușu Dejului, Vad, Valea Groșilor

Government
  - Mayor (2020–2024): David Prunean (PNL)
- Area: 77.20 km^{2} (29.81 sq mi)
- Elevation: 220 m (720 ft)
- Population (2021-12-01): 2,311
  - Density: 29.94/km^{2} (77.53/sq mi)
- Time zone: UTC+02:00 (EET)
  - Summer (DST): UTC+03:00 (EEST)
- Postal code: 407575
- Area code: +(40) x64
- Vehicle reg.: CJ
- Website: www.primariavad.ro

Vad (Hungarian: Révkolostor) is a commune in Cluj County, Transylvania, Romania. It is made up of seven villages: Bogata de Jos (Alsóbogáta), Bogata de Sus (Felsőbogáta), Calna (Kálna), Cetan (Csatány), Curtuiușu Dejului (Déskörtvélyes), Vad and Valea Groșilor (Tőkepataka).

The commune is located in the northern part of the county, on the border with Sălaj County, at a distance of 21 km (13 mi) from Dej and 77 km (48 mi) from the county seat, Cluj-Napoca. It lies on the left bank of the river Someș.

Historical population
| Year | Pop. | ±% |
|---|---|---|
| 1850 | 3,058 | — |
| 1880 | 3,102 | +1.4% |
| 1890 | 3,476 | +12.1% |
| 1900 | 3,800 | +9.3% |
| 1910 | 4,155 | +9.3% |
| 1920 | 4,037 | −2.8% |
| 1930 | 4,566 | +13.1% |
| 1941 | 5,172 | +13.3% |
| 1956 | 5,389 | +4.2% |
| 1966 | 4,698 | −12.8% |
| 1977 | 3,743 | −20.3% |
| 1992 | 2,286 | −38.9% |
| 2002 | 2,143 | −6.3% |
| 2011 | 2,008 | −6.3% |
| 2021 | 2,311 | +15.1% |
Source: Census data

According to the census from 2011, Vad had a total population of 2,008, of whom 95.77% were ethnic Romanians. At the 2021 census, the population had increased to 2,311, with 95.93% ethnic Romanians.

== Natives ==
- Eugen Cicero (1940–1997), Romanian-German jazz pianist
