= 3 (Nouvelle Vague album) =

Studio album by Nouvelle Vague
- Released: 16 June 2009
- Recorded: 2008–2009
- Genre: Jazz; bossa nova; lounge
- Label: Peacefrog
- Producer: Marc Collin; Olivier Libaux; Thibaut Barbillon

Nouvelle Vague chronology
Acoustic (2009)	3 (2009)	Couleurs sur Paris (2010)

3 (also known as NV3) is the third studio album by the French band Nouvelle Vague. It was released 16 June 2009 on Peacefrog Records. As with their previous releases, the album consists entirely of cover versions of post-punk and new wave songs from the 1970s and 1980s. Four of the tracks are performed as duets, featuring the song's original vocalist performing alongside one of Nouvelle Vague's female singers.

== Production ==
The band draws on a broader range of musical styles compared to their earlier albums; the covers here are inspired by blues and country music in addition to the familiar bossa nova and jazz. Several of the tracks on 3 are performed as duets, with Nouvelle Vague's female singers joined by the artists who sang on the original recordings. The tracks performed as duets are "Master and Servant" (featuring Martin Gore of Depeche Mode), "All My Colours" (with Ian McCulloch of Echo & the Bunnymen), "Our Lips Are Sealed" (with Terry Hall of The Specials), and "Parade" (with Barry Adamson of Magazine). David Byrne of Talking Heads and David Sylvian of Japan turned down invitations to appear on the album. The appearance of the original artists covering their own songs led one commentator to describe the record as "without a doubt the most meta covers album released this decade."

In another departure from the earlier albums, 3 also features two French-language songs, including a version of Plastic Bertrand's "Ça plane pour moi". Nouvelle Vague's Olivier Libaux explained, "Ca Plane Pour Moi was supposed to be the first French punk single. The thing is, it was sung by Plastic Bertrand – who was Belgian – and many French people think this song is a bit stupid. But it has been covered by bands like The Damned – so it seems that, abroad, this song is very respected. We chose the song because of this paradox."

== Release ==
3 charted in several European countries, peaking at number 57 in France, number 38 in Germany, and number 20 in Portugal. In 2009, it was awarded a silver certification from the Independent Music Companies Association which indicated sales of at least 30,000 copies throughout Europe.

== Critical reception ==
Professional ratings
Review scores
Source	Rating
AllMusic	3/5 stars
The Guardian	3/5 stars
PopMatters	6/10

The album received mixed reviews, with several critics suggesting that the concept of Nouvelle Vague itself had grown stale. The Guardian noted that the band had "spun out their quirky cover-versions project into a career that has outlasted that of some of the bands they've covered. That's sobering news for anyone who initially found Nouvelle Vague entertaining but has now had enough of their kitsch bossa-nova takes on indie classics." The review concluded that, "it's time for Collin and Libaux to find a new concept." PopMatters agreed: "The project made its point the first time around, and with the arrival of a third record, Nouvelle Vague's approach has become as subversive and surprising as placing rabbit ears behind someone's head in a class photo. More importantly, by devoting itself primarily to reformatting the songs into new genres, 3 often loses the soul of the original recordings—be it the giddy anxiety of "Blister in the Sun" or the inflammatory anger of "God Save the Queen"—without offering much in exchange." The Washington Post wrote that, "most of these covers aren't tugged far out of their element ... Nouvelle Vague's interpretations are stylish and pretty, but not especially novel." In contrast, BBC Music described the album as "a sublimely inventive concoction of clashing but surprisingly complementary moods and styles. Happily, NV3 shows little sign of Collin and Libaux running out of ideas or outstaying their welcome."

Critics focused their comments in particular on the tracks performed as duets. For The Guardian, "Barry Adamson and Nadeah Miranda are a modern Lee Hazlewood and Nancy Sinatra as they claw their way through Magazine's Parade." Commenting on the same song, AllMusic's critic stated, "Barry Adamson's sneering cool makes a noir version of Magazine's "Parade" the album's standout." In contrast, "the group's version of "Master and Servant" – which features a Jew's harp and Martin Gore's booming baritone on the chorus – feels overdone, and not even Terry Hall's cameo can save "Our Lips Are Sealed"'s transformation into a pastoral reverie from seeming a bit silly."

== Track listing ==
No.	Title	Writer(s)	Original artist	Length
1.	"Master and Servant" (featuring Martin Gore)	Martin Gore	Depeche Mode	3:22
2.	"Blister in the Sun"	Gordon Gano	Violent Femmes	3:15
3.	"Road to Nowhere"	David Byrne; Chris Frantz; Jerry Harrison; Tina Weymouth	Talking Heads	3:12
4.	"All My Colours" (featuring Ian McCulloch)	Ian McCulloch; Pete de Freitas; Les Pattinson; Will Sergeant	Echo & the Bunnymen	3:58
5.	"The American"	James Kerr; Charles Burchill; Derek Forbes; Brian McGee; Michael McNeil	Simple Minds	3:44
6.	"Heaven"	Richard Butler; Tim Butler	The Psychedelic Furs	4:09
7.	"Parade" (featuring Barry Adamson)	Barry Adamson; Howard Devoto; David Tomlinson	Magazine	4:04
8.	"Metal"	Gary Webb	Gary Numan	3:50
9.	"Ça plane pour moi"	Lou Deprijck; Yvan Lacomblez	Plastic Bertrand	3:25
10.	"Our Lips Are Sealed" (featuring Terry Hall)	Jane Wiedlin; Terry Hall	The Go-Go's; Fun Boy Three	3:30
11.	"God Save the Queen"	John Lydon; Paul Cook; Stephen Jones; Glen Matlock	Sex Pistols	2:49
12.	"Say Hello Wave Goodbye"	Marc Almond; David Ball	Soft Cell	5:01
13.	"So Lonely"	Gordon Sumner	The Police	3:48

Australian, European, and United States special edition bonus tracks
No.	Title	Writer(s)	Original artist	Length
14.	"Not Knowing" (featuring Samy Birnbach)	Samy Birnbach; Marinus Franken; Berry Sakharof; Malka Spigel	Minimal Compact	3:04
15.	"Aussi belle qu'une balle"	Daniel Rozoum; Mirwais Ahmadzai	Taxi Girl	3:32
16.	"Such a Shame"	Mark Hollis	Talk Talk	3:55

United Kingdom special edition bonus tracks
No.	Title	Writer(s)	Original artist	Length
14.	"Not Knowing" (featuring Samy Birnbach)	Birnbach; Franken; Sakharof; Spigel	Minimal Compact	3:04
15.	"Get a Grip"	Hugh Cornwell; Jet Black; Jean-Jacques Burnel; Dave Greenfield	The Stranglers	3:47
16.	"Such a Shame"	Hollis	Talk Talk	3:55

Japanese special edition bonus tracks
No.	Title	Writer(s)	Original artist	Length
14.	"Not Knowing" (featuring Samy Birnbach)	Birnbach; Franken; Sakharof; Spigel	Minimal Compact	3:04
15.	"Get a Grip"	Cornwell; Black; Burnel; Greenfield	The Stranglers	3:47
16.	"Such a Shame"	Hollis	Talk Talk	3:55
17.	"Girl U Want"	Mark Mothersbaugh; Gerald Casale	Devo	2:52
18.	"Don't You Want Me"	Philip Oakey; Jo Callis; Adrian Wright	The Human League	3:28
19.	"Subarashii Hibi" (featuring Maïa Barouh)	Tamio Okuda	Unicorn	4:21

Polish special edition bonus tracks
No.	Title	Writer(s)	Original artist	Length
14.	"Not Knowing" (featuring Samy Birnbach)	Birnbach; Franken; Sakharof; Spigel	Minimal Compact	3:04
15.	"Get a Grip"	Cornwell; Black; Burnel; Greenfield	The Stranglers	3:47
16.	"Such a Shame"	Hollis	Talk Talk	3:55
17.	"Johnny and Mary" (featuring Ania)	Robert Palmer	Robert Palmer	3:49

German Amazon bonus track
No.	Title	Writer(s)	Original artist	Length
14.	"I'm Stranded" (featuring Chris Bailey)	Chris Bailey; Ed Kuepper	The Saints	4:21

United Kingdom Amazon bonus track
No.	Title	Writer(s)	Original artist	Length
14.	"Enola Gay"	Andy McCluskey	Orchestral Manoeuvres in the Dark	3:44

iTunes Store bonus track
No.	Title	Writer(s)	Original artist	Length
14.	"Marooned"	Bruce Gilbert; Graham Lewis; Colin Newman	Wire	2:33

== Personnel ==
Nouvelle Vague

- Marc Collin – keyboards, programming, arrangement, mixing, production
- Olivier Libaux – bass, guitar, production ("Get a Grip")

Vocalists

- Mélanie Pain – vocals ("Master and Servant", "All My Colours", "God Save the Queen")
- Eloisia – vocals ("Blister in the Sun", "Metal")
- Sandra Dee – vocals ("Road to Nowhere", "Get a Grip")
- Silja – vocals ("The American")
- Karina Zeviani – vocals ("Heaven")
- Nadeah Miranda – vocals ("Parade", "So Lonely", "Don't You Want Me")
- Leelou – vocals ("Ça plane pour moi")
- Marina Celeste – vocals ("Our Lips Are Sealed")
- Sophie Delila – vocals ("Say Hello Wave Goodbye", "Such a Shame", "Girl U Want")
- Phoebe Killdeer – vocals ("Not Knowing")
- Jenia Lubich – vocals ("Aussi belle qu'une balle", "Marooned")
- Valente Bertelli – vocals ("Don't You Want Me")
- Maïa Barouh – flute, vocals ("Subarashii Hibi")
- Ania – vocals ("Johnny and Mary")
- Martin Gore – vocals ("Master and Servant")
- Ian McCulloch – vocals ("All My Colours")
- Barry Adamson – vocals ("Parade")
- Terry Hall – vocals ("Our Lips Are Sealed")
- Samy Birnbach – vocals ("Not Knowing")

Additional personnel

- Thibaut Barbillon – bass, guitar, production ("God Save the Queen")
- Julien Decoret – guitar
- Pete Hutchison – mastering
- Eric Poirier – brass, trumpet

== Charts ==
Chart (2009)	Peak position
Belgian Albums (Ultratop Flanders)	33
Belgian Albums (Ultratop Wallonia)	68
French Albums (SNEP)	57
German Albums (Offizielle Top 100)	38
Italian Albums (FIMI)	99
Portuguese Albums (AFP)	20
Swiss Albums (Schweizer Hitparade)	48
UK Albums (OCC)	113
