= Couleurs sur Paris =

Studio album by Nouvelle Vague
- Released: 16 November 2010
- Genre: Jazz; Bossa nova Lounge
- Label: Kwaidan; Barclay; Universal
- Producer: Marc Collin and Olivier Libaux

Nouvelle Vague chronology
3 (2009)	Couleurs sur Paris (2010)

Couleurs sur Paris is the fourth album by the French covers band Nouvelle Vague, released 16 November 2010. The album is the group's first to be sung mostly in French, consisting largely of covers of French new wave and post-punk songs from the 1970s and 1980s.

When the album was reissued on (limited edition) vinyl in 2020, it was retitled Version Française.

== Release ==
The album peaked at number 52 in the French album charts, spending a total of 9 weeks in the top 200. It reached number 35 in Greece, number 73 in Switzerland, and number 47 in Belgium (Walloon chart).

The album attracted mixed reviews in the French-speaking press.

== Track listing ==
There are different editions of the album, all with 16 tracks but with a different tracklisting (and running order) depending on the release. The tracklisting below has been aggregated. Track 18 was only on the CDr promo from 2010. Some tracks or versions later appeared on the 2019 digital release Rarities.

No.	Title	Singer(s)	Original artist	Length
1	"Voilà les anges"	Cœur de Pirate	Gamine	3:36
2	"L'aventurier"	Helena Noguerra et Louis Ronan Choisy	Indochine	4:22
3	"Week-end à Rome"	Vanessa Paradis et Étienne Daho	Étienne Daho	4:39
4	"Putain putain"	Camille	TC Matic	3:10
5	"Marcia Baïla"	Adrienne Pauly	Les Rita Mitsouko	4:18
6	"Anne cherchait l'amour"	Julien Doré	Elli et Jacno	3:47
7	"Ophélie"	Yelle	Jad Wio	3:28
8	"So Young But So Cold"	Charlie Winston	Kas Product	3:25
9	"Sandy Sandy"	Soko	Dogs	2:44
10	"Mala Vida"	Olivia Ruiz	Mano Negra	3:39
11	"Où veux-tu qu'je r'garde?"	Emily Loizeau	Noir Désir	3:45
12	"Amoureux solitaires"	Hugh Coltman	Lio	2:10
13	"2 People in a Room"	Cocoon	Stephan Eicher	3:29
14	"Sur ma mob"	Mareva Galanter	Lili Drop	4:30
15	"Déréglée"	Mélanie Pain	Marie France	2:37
16	"Je suis déjà parti"	Coralie Clément	Taxi Girl	4:11
17	"Oublions l'Amérique"	Nadeah Miranda	Wunderbach	3:30
18	"Les ailes de verre"	Jeanne Cherhal	Marc Seberg	4:52
