= Sophie Delila =

- Sophie Delila Performing in 2009

Background information
- Born: Sophie Delila; 7 August 1983 (age 43); Paris, France
- Genres: Pop, rock, soul
- Occupations: Singer, songwriter, musician, record producer
- Instruments: Piano, guitar, vocals
- Years active: 2005–present
- Website: www.sophiedelila.com

Sophie Delila (born 7 August 1983), is a London-based French recording artist, songwriter, musician and producer currently signed to Universal Music.

== Early life ==
Sophie Delila was born and raised in Paris. Her father is an accomplished piano player and composer and her mother is a singer. Delila began playing the piano at age 5 and spent much of her childhood recording and songwriting in her father's home studio. Growing up, Delila was influenced by soul, blues and pop, particularly by artists such as Stevie Wonder, Aretha Franklin, Ray Charles, Michael Jackson and the Beatles. At age 17 Delila won a scholarship to study at Berklee College of Music in Boston, Massachusetts.

== Career ==
After graduating Delila spent a couple of years songwriting and gigging in New York City. Here she wrote, recorded and produced the album All Yours which was independently released in 2005. Later that year, Delila moved to London, where she still lives. Working on new material, performing and collaborating with artists, she became the subject of some press attention particularly for a guest performance with Lewis Taylor at the Jazz Cafe in 2006. In 2008 Delila was signed as a solo artist by Universal Music. As a songwriter Delila has worked with artists such as Jeff Beck, Jack Savoretti, Rumer, Pixie Lott, Duffy, Phoebe Killdeer (Nouvelle Vague), George Cosby, and Rebecca Ferguson, amongst others.

=== Hooked European Release (2008) ===
Delila's first album for Universal is entitled Hooked. Delila co-wrote and co-produced the majority of the album with Steve Booker who experienced extensive success co-writing/producing in 2008 with Duffy and the Sugababes and previously with Natalie Imbruglia. Other collaborators on the album are Blair MacKichan, Derrick McKenzie, Jon Kelly, Julien Jabre, Michael Tordjman, Robert Kirby and Simon Hale. Hooked was released in France in November 2008 and was promoted throughout 2009 in continental Europe. Her first single in the continental European territories was "Nature of the Crime" which was extensively aired in France, Greece, Spain, Belgium, and Switzerland. Although Hooked was not released in the UK at that time, British publications Music Week, the Daily Mirror and the Daily Star all picked up on the album.

=== Hooked UK Release (2010) ===
Delila's album was released on 1 June licensed from Universal through Wrasse Records. Delila played sold out dates at Ronnie Scott's and Soho House as well as appearing at music festivals including Rockness and the Carnaby Street Festival – at the latter she performed exclusively on the inaugural Liberty Music Stage, a new venture for Liberty. Lead single, "Can't Keep Loving You" was released concurrently with the album and was selected as iTunes Single of the Week for w/c 21 June. Four different mixes of the track are available, including the Max Desprez remix. The latter is a disco house remix that appeared in the Music Week Pop Commercial Chart for several weeks throughout May and June, peaking at position #17 with the track also receiving radio airplay.

=== Collaborations ===
Delila has written and featured for several artists. In particular in 2009 she featured on 2 tracks entitled "Say Hello, Wave Goodbye" and "Such a Shame" on Nouvelle Vague's album 3. The album was released in the UK on 29 June 2009 on Peacefrog Records. Delila also co-wrote a song featured on Westlife's last album Where We Are which was released in late 2009. The song is entitled "Another World" and was co-written with Steve Booker. In 2010 Delila performed several times with Plan B including appearances on Radio 1Xtra's Live Lounge and at the Shepherd's Bush Empire. She most recently collaborated with Jeff Beck, writing with him and the Sanctuary Music Vault team for his upcoming album. Jeff invited her to perform as a guest vocalist on several European dates of his 2014 World Tour.

=== Touring ===
Delila toured all over Europe in 2009 promoting Hooked. In the summer she performed at the Musilac Festival in France and the Kosmos Festival in Greece. She was also featured as one of the lead vocalists on Nouvelle Vague's European tour in late 2009 which included a sold out show at London's Roundhouse. In late 2010 she also appeared as a special guest during their show at the Royal Albert Hall. In April 2009 she supported Lionel Richie on the Parisian leg of his European tour at the Bercy Stadium; she revisited the venue in April 2011 to support Jamiroquai. Delila has played at venues including The Royal Albert Hall, Ronnie Scott's, The Round House, the Jazz Café, Soho Revue Bar, Hoxton Bar and Kitchen, The Bedford and The Regal Room in London, L'Elysée Montmartre, Palais Omnisports de Paris-Bercy, Le Bataclan in Paris, and the Blue Note, Joe's Pub, S.O.B's and B.B. King's in New York City.

== Musical style ==
Delila describes her music as melodramatic soul pop. Referring to one of the lead singles from Hooked in early 2009 Music Week wrote "Nature of the Crime is an effortless pop song which oozes Motown class."

== Discography ==
=== Albums ===
- All Yours (2005)
- Hooked (2008)
- My Life Could Use a Remix (2014)

=== EPs ===
- What Did I Do (2012)

=== Singles ===
- "Nature of the Crime" (2009)
- "Can't Keep Loving You" (2010)
- "What Did I Do" with Christophe Willem (2012)

== Songwriters Credits ==
Songwriter's Discography
Year	Artist	Album	Song	Co-written with
2009	Westlife	Where We Are	"Another World"	Steve Booker
2012	Phoebe Killdeer	Innerquake	"Innerquake"	Phoebe Killdeer
2012	Aleks Josh	Cruise EP	"Dusty Road"	Aleks Josh
2012	Aleks Josh	Cruise EP	"Mr Maker"	Aleks Josh
2014	Jeff Beck	Yosagai	"Why Give It Away"	Jeff Beck, Eric Appapoulay, Cassell the Beatmaker, David McEwan
2014	Rumer	Into Colour	"Dangerous"	Rumer, Rob Shirakbaki, Rick Nowels, Stephen Bishop
2015	Pixie Lott	N/A	"High Hopes"	Pixie Lott, Cassell the Beatmaker
