= Les Parisiennes (band) =

- Origin: France
- Genres: Pop, Yéyé
- Years active: 1964–1972, 1972–1973, 1974, 2018–2019
- Past members: Raymonde Bronstein; Anne Lefébure; Hélène Longuet; Anne-Marie Royer; Viviane Chiffre; Marie Lefleve; Hélène Amador; Yveline Arnaud; Nathalie Bréhal; Annie Lecreux; Antonia Barkoff; Juliet Naylor; Arielle Dombasle; Mareva Galanter; Inna Modja; Helena Noguerra

Les Parisiennes was a group of French dancers and singers.

Funded in 1964 by Claude Bolling, the titles of the Parisiennes were for the most part composed by him, and written by Franck Gerald. The band originally dissolved in 1971, and had multiple short-lived formations.

== Members ==
- Raymonde Bronstein (1964–1971)
- Anne Lefébure (1964-1971, 1972-1973)
- Hélène Longuet (1964-1971)
- Anne-Marie Royer (1964-1971)
- Viviane Chiffre (1971, 1972-1973)
- Marie Lefleve (1972-1973)
- Hélène Amador (1972-1973)
- Yveline Arnaud (1973, 1974)
- Nathalie Bréhal (1974)
- Annie Lecreux (1974)
- Antonia Berkov (1974)
- Juliet Naylor (1974)
- Arielle Dombasle (2018-2019)
- Mareva Galanter (2018-2019)
- Inna Modja (2018-2019)
- Helena Noguerra (2018-2019)

== Lineups ==
Les Parisiennes / Claude Bolling Et Les Parisiennes

1964-1971

- Raymonde Bronstein
- Anne Lefébure
- Hélène Longuet
- Anne-Marie Royer

Les Parisiennes

1971

- Anne Lefébure
- Viviane Chiffre
- Hélène Longuet
- Anne-Marie Royer

Les Parisiennes / Les Nouvelles Parisiennes

1972-1973

- Anne Lefébure
- Viviane Chiffre
- Hélène Amador
- Marie Lefleve

Les Parisiennes / Les Nouvelles Parisiennes

1973

- Anne Lefébure
- Viviane Chiffre
- Yveline Arnaud
- Marie Lefleve

Les Parisiennes

1974

- Yveline Arnaud
- Nathalie Bréhal
- Annie Lecreux
- Antonia Berkov

Les Parisiennes

1974

- Yveline Arnaud
- Nathalie Bréhal
- Annie Lecreux
- Juliet Naylor

Les Parisiennes

2018-2019

- Arielle Dombasle
- Mareva Galanter
- Inna Modja
- Helena Noguerra
