= Acoustic (Nouvelle Vague album) =

Live album by Nouvelle Vague
- Released: 2009
- Recorded: Auditório Municipal Augusto Cabrita, Barreiro, Portugal, 5 February 2009
- Genre: Jazz; Bossa nova Lounge
- Label: New Sound Dimension under license from Peacefrog
- Producer: Luis Carlos for New Sound Dimension

Nouvelle Vague chronology
Bande à Part (2006)	Acoustic (2009)	3 (2009)

Acoustic is a live album by the French covers band Nouvelle Vague, recorded at a concert at the Auditório Municipal Augusto Cabrita in Barreiro, Portugal. All songs are acoustic versions of songs from the band's studio albums Nouvelle Vague, Bande à Part and 3, except for "Sweet Dreams" and "Relax" which do not appear on any of those albums.

== Critical reception ==
Professional ratings
Review scores
Source	Rating
PopMatters	7/10 stars

PopMatters wrote that the album "succeeds where so many [live albums] have failed, by creating a loose and free-wheeling sound which should please listeners today, as much as it appears to have pleased the assembled crowd back in 2009."

== Track listing ==
No.	Title	Original Artist	Length
1.	"The Killing Moon" (from Bande à Part)	Echo & the Bunnymen	3:42
2.	"A Forest" (from Nouvelle Vague)	The Cure	2:35
3.	"Ever Fallen In Love" (from Bande à Part)	Buzzcocks	3:12
4.	"Don't Go" (from Bande à Part)	Yazoo	4:29
5.	"Blue Monday" (from Bande à Part)	New Order	2:10
6.	"Human Fly" (from Bande à Part)	The Cramps	4:07
7.	"Guns of Brixton" (from Nouvelle Vague)	The Clash	3:36
8.	"Too Drunk to Fuck" (from Nouvelle Vague)	Dead Kennedys	5:39
9.	"God Save the Queen" (from 3)	Sex Pistols	3:28
10.	"Heart of Glass" (from Bande à Part)	Blondie	5:27
11.	"Sweet Dreams"	Eurythmics	5:23
12.	"Dance with Me" (from Bande à Part)	The Lords of the New Church	3:38
13.	"In a Manner of Speaking" (from Nouvelle Vague)	Tuxedomoon	4:05
14.	"Love Will Tear Us Apart" (from Nouvelle Vague)	Joy Division	4:26
15.	"Blister in the Sun" (from 3)	Violent Femmes	4:16
16.	"This Is Not a Love Song" (from Nouvelle Vague)	Public Image Ltd.	3:14
17.	"Just Can't Get Enough" (from Nouvelle Vague)	Depeche Mode	3:30
18.	"Relax"	Frankie Goes to Hollywood	5:53
