= Bande à Part (album) =

Studio album by Nouvelle Vague
- Released: 14 June 2006
- Genre: Easy listening; lounge; bossa nova
- Label: Peacefrog
- Producer: Marc Collin; Olivier Libaux; Avril

Nouvelle Vague chronology
Nouvelle Vague (2004)	Bande à Part (2006)	Acoustic (2009)

Bande à Part is the second studio album by the French band Nouvelle Vague. It was released on 14 June 2006 in Europe on Peacefrog Records. Like the band's eponymous first album, Bande à Part is a collection of bossa nova cover versions of 1980s new wave tracks.

The European edition has 14 standard tracks, with an 18-track limited edition. The slightly different United States edition, on the Luaka Bop label, has 14 standard tracks, with a 17-track limited edition.

== Release ==
Bande à Part was a commercial success, charting in several European countries. The album peaked at number 23 on the French album charts, number 15 on the German charts, and number 8 on the Portuguese charts. It also reached number 79 in the UK Albums Chart. The album was awarded a gold certification from the Independent Music Companies Association, indicating sales of at least 100,000 copies throughout Europe.

The music video for "Dance with Me" references the famous dance sequence from Jean-Luc Godard's film Bande à part (1964).

== Critical reception ==
Professional ratings
Review scores
Source	Rating
AllMusic	2.5/5 stars
MusicOMH	3/5 stars
Now	3/5
Pitchfork	5.9/10
PopMatters	6/10
Spin	1/5 stars

The reviews for the band's self-titled first album, released in 2004, had been generally positive. In contrast, Bande à Part received more mixed reviews. AllMusic drew an explicit comparison between the two albums, writing, "It was something of a small miracle that the first Nouvelle Vague album managed to avoid the seemingly inherent kitsch of covering new wave classics as slinky bossa nova. Unfortunately, the group doesn't quite pull it off the second time around." Spin gave the record a 1 out of 5 rating, dismissing it as consisting mostly of "breathy trip-hop cabaret kitsch, often sung in an infantilized ingenue voice."

MusicOMH suggested that "ultimately Nouvelle Vague’s downfall is not ability or material, but concept. What exactly is the point of it all? Yes, it’s pleasant, but by the end we want to hear some original material from what is obviously a superbly talented collection of musicians. We don’t get it – and are instead left with a compilation of sophisticated karaoke numbers for lounge fanatics." The reviewer pointed out that one of the vocalists who had featured on the first album, Camille, had gone on to have successful solo career: "Camille, meanwhile, is showing the world that we shouldn’t discount solo careers for Nouvelle Vague’s individual parts."

Pitchfork suggested that the album's strongest material is its covers of lesser-known songs: "hopefully casual listeners will stick around for the closing triptych of lesser-known pleasures: a string-swept lullaby take on Heaven 17's "Let Me Go"; a funereal, accordion-abetted march through Visage's "Fade to Grey"; and the dreamily seductive closer "Waves", a recasting of a song by Brit new-wave curios Blancmange that sounds like the secrets Hope Sandoval keeps when she's talking in her sleep." PopMatters agrees: "What sets Nouvelle Vague apart from your average cover-band-with-a-twist is that only about half the songs on this record are well known." The reviewer gives a mixed appraisal of the covers of the more well-known songs: " "Ever Fallen In Love?" is the only well-known song on Bande a Part that transitions ... seamlessly to Bossa Nova. While "Dancing with Myself" is always fun, it clearly doesn't work too well, and "Heart of Glass" and "Pride (In the Name of Love)" fall flat."

== Track listing ==
=== European release ===
Standard edition
No.	Title	Writer(s)	Original artist	Length
1.	"The Killing Moon"	Ian McCulloch; Pete de Freitas; Les Pattinson; Will Sergeant	Echo & the Bunnymen	3:39
2.	"Ever Fallen in Love"	Pete Shelley	Buzzcocks	3:19
3.	"Dance with Me"	Stephen Bator, Jr.; Brian James	The Lords of the New Church	3:40
4.	"Don't Go"	Vince Clarke	Yazoo	3:43
5.	"Dancing with Myself"	Billy Idol; Tony James	Generation X	3:08
6.	"Heart of Glass"	Debbie Harry; Chris Stein	Blondie	3:34
7.	"O Pamela"	Carolyn Allen; Steven Allen; Robert Gillespie; Alex Macpherson; Gerald McInulty	The Wake	4:26
8.	"Blue Monday"	Bernard Sumner; Gillian Gilbert; Peter Hook; Stephen Morris	New Order	3:06
9.	"Human Fly"	Lux Interior; Ivy Rorschach	The Cramps	2:49
10.	"Bela Lugosi's Dead"	Daniel Ash; David Haskins; Kevin Haskins; Peter Murphy	Bauhaus	4:00
11.	"Escape Myself"	Adrian Borland	The Sound	3:43
12.	"Let Me Go"	Glenn Gregory; Ian Craig Marsh; Martyn Ware	Heaven 17	3:53
13.	"Fade to Grey"	Billy Currie; Chris Payne; Midge Ure	Visage	4:45
14.	"Waves"	Neil Arthur; Stephen Luscombe	Blancmange	3:16

Standard edition bonus track
No.	Title	Writer(s)	Original artist	Length
15.	"Eisbär" (omitted on UK standard editions)	Martin Eicher	Grauzone	3:43

Special edition bonus tracks
No.	Title	Writer(s)	Original artist	Length
15.	"Sweet and Tender Hooligan" (live)	Morrissey; Johnny Marr	The Smiths	3:02
16.	"Shack Up"	Joseph Carter; Moe Daniels	Banbarra	3:45
17.	"Israel"	Susan Ballion; Peter Clarke; John McGeoch; Steven Severin	Siouxsie and the Banshees	4:38
18.	"Eisbär"	Eicher	Grauzone	3:43

=== United States release ===
Standard edition
No.	Title	Writer(s)	Original artist	Length
1.	"The Killing Moon"	McCulloch; de Freitas; Pattinson; Sergeant	Echo & the Bunnymen	3:39
2.	"Ever Fallen in Love"	Shelley	Buzzcocks	3:19
3.	"Dance with Me"	Bator; B. James	The Lords of the New Church	3:40
4.	"Don't Go"	Clarke	Yazoo	3:43
5.	"Dancing with Myself"	Idol; T. James	Generation X	3:08
6.	"Pride (In the Name of Love)"	Bono; Adam Clayton; The Edge; Larry Mullen, Jr.	U2	3:08
7.	"O Pamela"	C. Allen; S. Allen; Gillespie; Macpherson; McInulty	The Wake	4:26
8.	"Heart of Glass"	Harry; Stein	Blondie	3:34
9.	"Confusion"	Sumner; Gilbert; Hook; Morris; Arthur Baker	New Order	3:22
10.	"Human Fly"	Interior; Rorschach	The Cramps	2:49
11.	"Bela Lugosi's Dead"	Ash; D. Haskins; K. Haskins; Murphy	Bauhaus	4:00
12.	"Shack Up"	Carter; Daniels	Banbarra	3:45
13.	"Let Me Go"	Gregory; Marsh; Ware	Heaven 17	3:53
14.	"Fade to Grey"	Currie; Payne; Ure	Visage	4:45

Special edition bonus tracks
No.	Title	Writer(s)	Original artist	Length
15.	"Sweet and Tender Hooligan" (live)	Morrissey; Marr	The Smiths	3:02
16.	"Moody"	Renee Scroggins; Deborah Scroggins; Marie Scroggins; Valerie Scroggins	ESG	3:00
17.	"Blue Monday"	Sumner; Gilbert; Hook; Morris	New Order	3:06

== Personnel ==
Nouvelle Vague

- Marc Collin – keyboards, programming, Rhodes piano, vibraphone, arrangement, mixing, production
- Olivier Libaux – bass, guitar, keyboards, ukulele, arrangement, mixing, production

Vocalists

- Mélanie Pain – vocals ("The Killing Moon", "Ever Fallen in Love", "Dance with Me", "Blue Monday", "Sweet and Tender Hooligan", "Confusion"), backing vocals ("Heart of Glass")
- Gerald Toto – vocals ("Don't Go", "Heart of Glass", "Israel", "Moody")
- Phoebe Killdeer – vocals ("Dancing with Myself", "Human Fly", "Bela Lugosi's Dead", "Escape Myself", "Shack Up")
- Marina – vocals ("O Pamela", "Fade to Grey", "Waves", "Eisbaer")
- Silja – vocals ("Let Me Go")
- Birdpaula aka Paula Moore – vocals ("Pride (In the Name of Love)")
- Eve – backing vocals ("Don't Go")

Additional personnel

- Avril – arrangement, mixing, production ("Don't Go")
- Thibaut Barbillon – bass, guitar
- Gordon Brislawn – mixing, production ("Sweet and Tender Hooligan")
- Fred Loiseau – guitar
- Christophe Mink – double bass
- Thomas Ostrowiecki – percussion
- Benoit Rault – flute
- David Venitucci – accordion
- Etienne Wersinger – clavinet

== Charts ==
Chart (2006)	Peak position
Belgian Albums (Ultratop Flanders)	13
Belgian Albums (Ultratop Wallonia)	45
Dutch Albums (Album Top 100)	83
French Albums (SNEP)	23
German Albums (Offizielle Top 100)	15
Italian Albums (FIMI)	64
Portuguese Albums (AFP)	8
Swedish Albums (Sverigetopplistan)	56
Swiss Albums (Schweizer Hitparade)	26
UK Albums (OCC)	79
US Heatseekers Albums (Billboard)	36
US Independent Albums (Billboard)	39
US Top Dance Albums (Billboard)	7
