= Nouvelle Vague (album) =

Studio album by Nouvelle Vague
- Released: 9 August 2004
- Genre: Easy listening; lounge; bossa nova
- Length: 46:30
- Label: Peacefrog; Luaka Bop (US)
- Producer: Nouvelle Vague

Nouvelle Vague chronology
| Nouvelle Vague (2004) | Bande à Part (2006) |

US release cover

Nouvelle Vague is the debut studio album by the French band Nouvelle Vague. It was first released on 9 August 2004 on Peacefrog Records.

The album consists entirely of easy listening and bossa nova versions of songs that were written and recorded during the post-punk/new wave era. The band's name is a play on words, new wave and bossa nova being the literal translations, in English and Portuguese respectively, of the French phrase Nouvelle Vague, which is itself a reference to the French cinema movement of the 1950s and 1960s. The songs were recorded with female vocalists who had not previously heard the songs they would be covering.

== Background and production ==
Marc Collin and Olivier Libaux began work on the project in 2003, after Collin had the idea of covering Joy Division's "Love Will Tear Us Apart" in a bossa nova style. Libaux later explained: "I met Marc Collin during the '90s, at a friend's place. Marc was the first musician I met in years who I could talk [to] about new wave music. For some reason, at the end of the '80s, punk and new wave music had turned into a sort of old-fashioned music, which nobody was talking about anymore. Meeting Marc, I could talk about The Stranglers, The Cure and The Sisters of Mercy again. We then have worked on a couple of albums he was producing ... Starting Nouvelle Vague was sounding obvious for us, as our ideas were matching, and the songs were happening well and quickly." The album was produced and recorded over a period of eight months.

== Artwork ==
The Guardian included the album's artwork in a list of the ten "most beautiful sleeves of 2004". The newspaper wrote, "The band's covers feature sultry 1960s figures, the work of fashion designer Giles Deacon, with a self-consciously lo-fi feel." The album's art director was quoted explaining, "We were very anti-computer ... Each letter of the band's name was cut out by hand, but done so in a deliberately rigid manner, as a kind of whimsical nod to modernism."

== Release ==
Nouvelle Vague peaked at number 69 on the French album charts, spending a total of 39 weeks in the top 200. The album also charted on Belgian album charts, peaking at number 100 in the Walloon chart and number 96 in the Flemish chart. In 2006, it was reported that the album had sold more than 200,000 copies worldwide.

== Critical reception ==
Professional ratings
Review scores
| Source | Rating |
|---|---|
| AllMusic | 3/5 stars |
| Collective | 4/5 |
| Entertainment Weekly | B+ |
| The Guardian | 4/5 stars |
| The Independent | 4/5 stars |
| Mojo | 4/5 stars |
| NME | 1/10 |
| Pitchfork | 7.0/10 |
| Q | 4/5 stars |
| Rolling Stone | 3/5 stars |

Nouvelle Vague received generally positive reviews. Pitchfork's reviewer wrote, "The supposed ignorance of the singers plays well for this record's lack of irony, a big part of what makes it succeed as a well-meaning, well-executed novelty." The Telegraph wrote, "Marc Collin and Oliver Libaux and their eight guest chanteuses transform these songs with such skill and sincerity to their Latin syncopation that each becomes altogether new and lovely." The Guardian's reviewer wrote, "Only a frisky samba romp through Depeche Mode's 'Just Can't Get Enough' flirts with kitsch. Elsewhere, familiar lyrics and arrangements are turned inside out to generate frosty menace (The Clash's 'Guns of Brixton'), giggly coquetry ('Too Drunk To Fuck' by the Dead Kennedys) or haunting languor (The Cure's 'A Forest', teeming with birdsong)."

The more negative reviews take issue with the concept of the album itself. AllMusic's review begins: "The best compliment that can be paid to Nouvelle Vague's self-titled debut album: it isn't as arch and smirking as a collection of bossa nova versions of new wave classics by fetching French and Brazilian chanteuses would suggest." The NME gave the album a 1 out of 10 rating, writing, "the very concept of Nouvelle Vague – alternative '80s hits done in a deeply kitsch, sub-Bebel Gilberto sunset-samba style – is one that's so tired, so looooong past any imagined sell-by date that we're honestly astounded it exists." Several reviewers drew comparisons, both favourable and unfavourable, with an album of Kraftwerk covers recorded by the German musician Uwe Schmidt (also known as Señor Coconut), El Baile Alemán (2000).

In 2015, The Telegraph named the album's cover of "Just Can't Get Enough" in a list of the "50 best covers".

== Track listing ==
| No. | Title | Writer(s) | Original artist | Length |
|---|---|---|---|---|
| 1. | "Love Will Tear Us Apart" | Ian Curtis; Peter Hook; Stephen Morris; Bernard Sumner | Joy Division | 3:18 |
| 2. | "Just Can't Get Enough" | Vince Clarke | Depeche Mode | 3:07 |
| 3. | "In a Manner of Speaking" | Winston Tong | Tuxedomoon | 3:58 |
| 4. | "Guns of Brixton" | Paul Simonon | The Clash | 4:06 |
| 5. | "This Is Not a Love Song" | John Lydon; Keith Levene; Martin Atkins | Public Image Ltd | 3:47 |
| 6. | "Too Drunk to Fuck" (omitted on US editions) | Jello Biafra | Dead Kennedys | 2:16 |
| 7. | "Marian" | Andrew Eldritch; Wayne Hussey | The Sisters of Mercy | 3:53 |
| 8. | "Making Plans for Nigel" | Colin Moulding | XTC | 3:32 |
| 9. | "A Forest" | Robert Smith; Simon Gallup; Matthieu Hartley; Lol Tolhurst | The Cure | 3:39 |
| 10. | "I Melt with You" | Robbie Grey; Gary McDowell; Stephen Walker; Richard Brown; Michael Conroy | Modern English | 4:00 |
| 11. | "Teenage Kicks" | John O'Neill | The Undertones | 2:13 |
| 12. | "Psyche" | Jaz Coleman; Martin Glover; Paul Raven; Geordie Walker | Killing Joke | 4:12 |
| 13. | "Friday Night Saturday Morning" | Terry Hall | The Specials | 4:22 |

Special edition bonus tracks
| No. | Title | Writer(s) | Original artist | Length |
|---|---|---|---|---|
| 14. | "Sorry for Laughing" | Paul Haig; Malcolm Ross | Josef K | 3:09 |
| 15. | "Wishing (If I Had a Photograph of You)" | Mike Score; Ali Score; Frank Maudsley; Paul Reynolds | A Flock of Seagulls | 2:42 |

== Personnel ==
Nouvelle Vague

- Marc Collin – keyboards, programming, arrangement, production, mixing
- Olivier Libaux – bass, guitar, keyboards, arrangement, production, mixing

Vocalists

- Eloisia – vocals ("Love Will Tear Us Apart" and "Just Can't Get Enough")
- Camille – vocals ("In a Manner of Speaking", "Guns of Brixton", "Too Drunk to Fuck" and "Making Plans for Nigel")
- Mélanie Pain – vocals ("This Is Not a Love Song" and "Teenage Kicks")
- Alex – vocals ("Marian")
- Marina Céleste – vocals ("A Forest" and "Sorry for Laughing")
- Silja – vocals ("I Melt with You" and "Wishing (If I Had a Photograph of You)")
- Sir Alice – vocals ("Psyche")
- Daniella D'Ambrosio – vocals ("Friday Night Saturday Morning")

Additional personnel

- Nicolas Deutsch – double bass (Tracks 1–4)
- Giles Deacon – illustration
- Dylan Kendle – art direction
- David Sheppard – liner notes

== Charts ==
| Chart (2004–05) | Peak position |
|---|---|
| Belgian Albums (Ultratop Flanders) | 96 |
| Belgian Albums (Ultratop Wallonia) | 100 |
| French Albums (SNEP) | 69 |
| UK Albums (OCC) | 114 |
| US Top Dance Albums (Billboard) | 9 |

== Certifications ==
| Region | Certification | Certified units/sales |
|---|---|---|
| United Kingdom (BPI) | Silver | 60,000^{^} |
^{^} Shipments figures based on certification alone.

== Release history ==
| Region | Date | Label | Catalogue no. | Type |
|---|---|---|---|---|
| United Kingdom | 9 August 2004 | Peacefrog Records | PFG051; PFG051CD | Standard edition |
| France | 2 November 2004 | Peacefrog Records | PFG051; PFG051CD | Standard edition |
| United Kingdom | November 2004 | Peacefrog Records | PFG062CD | Special edition |
| United States | 3 May 2005 | Luaka Bop | 68089-90061-2 | Standard edition |
