= Nadéah =

Australian singer-songwriter

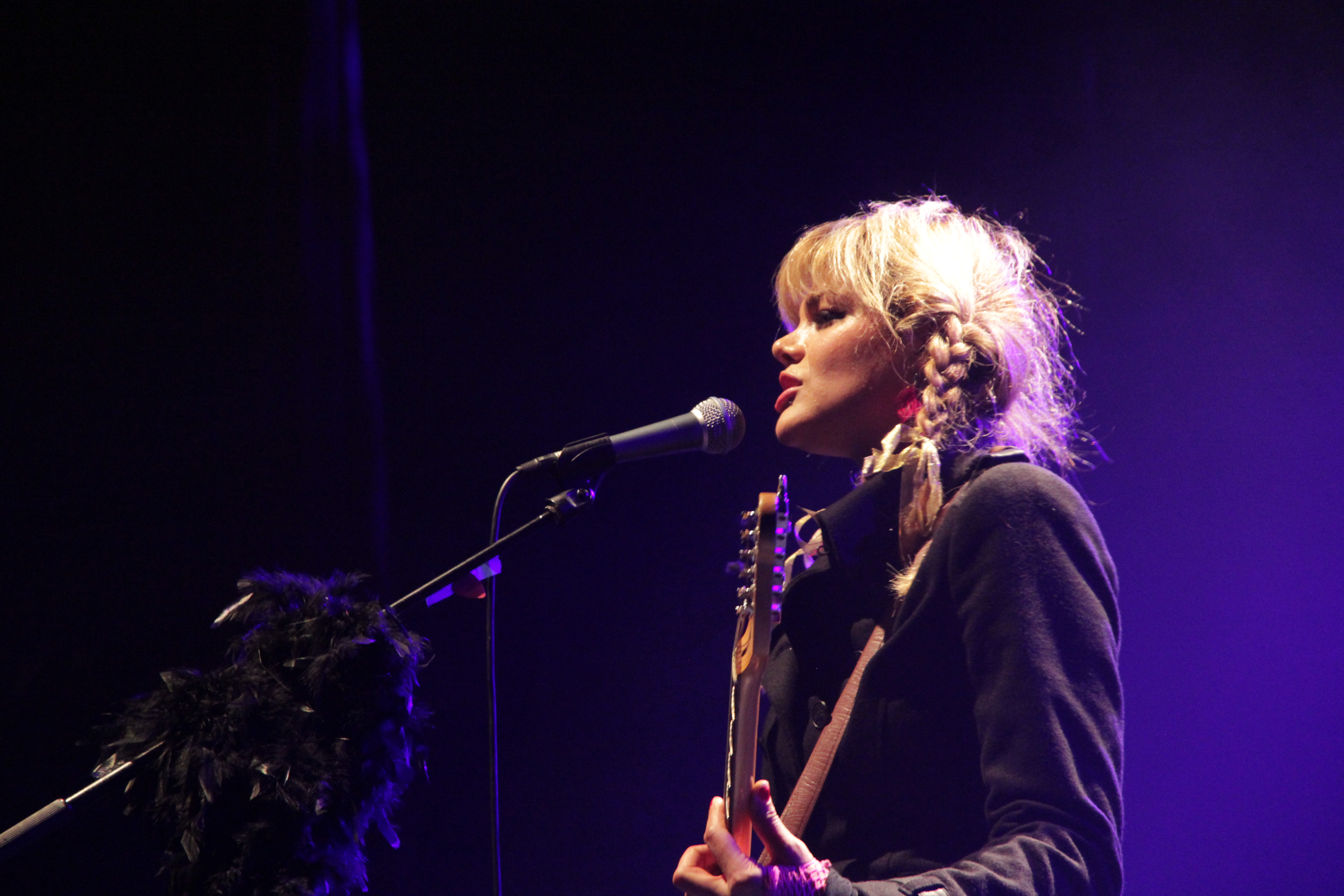
- Nadéah performing in 2011

Background information
- Born: 31 December 1980 (age 45); Melbourne, Australia
- Genres: Pop, rock, electronic
- Occupations: Musician, singer-songwriter
- Instruments: Vocals, guitar
- Website: http://www.nadeah.com/

Nadéah is an Australian singer-songwriter, model, and actress. She is the cofounder of the group The Lovegods and sang with the band Nouvelle Vague before she began a solo career under the name Nadéah. She has released three solo albums, Venus Gets Even (2011), While the Heart Beats (2016) and Milk Teeth (2019).

== Early life and education ==
Nadéah was born in Melbourne to a Serbian/Portuguese/Anglo-Indian mother and a Persian father. She gave her first solo performance at age 12, in a school song festival, and at about this time she began writing songs. She went on to perform in annual school productions at various TV and modelling work during her teens. After finishing secondary school, she was accepted into the Victorian College of Arts to study visual and performance art, but did not attend.

== Career ==
In the early 2000s, Nadéah was one half of a duo formed with the Parisian guitarist Art Menuteau, under the name The Lovegods. The duo signed with Island Records, although they never released an album through this label. They supported the band Fun Lovin' Criminals on their 2003 UK tour, as well as Nick Cave and Franz Ferdinand. After recording their EP Give Me A New God 'Cause This One Is Broken and the song "Sadie Mercedes", the LoveGods won 2004 BBC Radio 1's best unsigned band. They released two albums, Between Dogs & Wolves (2004) and Audience of One (2005).

In 2006 Nadéah released The Crossroads EP recorded in Waxhaw, North Carolina at a local bible college. She then returned to Paris, France and joined the Beatles covers project B for Bang, and recorded "Happiness Is a Warm Gun" on their first album and various songs including "Because" on their second album. Shortly after that, French producer Marc Collin asked her to sing four tracks on his Hollywood Mon Amour '80s soundtracks revisited project.

Nadéah later joined the French new wave covers band Nouvelle Vague, replacing Camille and Phoebe Killdeer and appearing on the band's album 3 (2009), on which she performs a version of the Magazine song, "Parade".

Nadéah began her solo career after she met the Italian classical conductor Nicola Tescari, who went on to produce Nadéah's debut solo album, Venus Gets Even, released in 2011. Its songs have been described as a blend of "old-school cabaret" and "contemporary jazz-pop". Following the release of the album, Nadéah cited several artists as influences: in terms of lyrics, she cited Lou Reed, Tori Amos, The Velvet Underground, Muse, and Leonard Cohen; in terms of musical style, Tori Amos again, Pink Floyd, Janis Joplin, and Jimi Hendrix.

In 2012 she modelled for French clothing label IKKS and has played various private shows for Hermès, Pirelli, Citroën, In 2014 she acted in Cristina Comencini's film Latin Lover.

Nadéah's second solo album, While the Heart Beats, released in 2016, was produced by Rob Ellis, who had previously worked with artists including PJ Harvey and Bat for Lashes, and by Marc Collin of Nouvelle Vague. The album sees Nadéah returning to the alternative rock style of her earlier work with the Lovegods, and incorporates electro and disco influences.

In 2020, Nadéah became the first artist to release her music on vinyl through the independent imprint Fetch Happened Records. All three of her solo albums and a collection of LoveGods tracks titled "Collage" were released on vinyl through the label between 2020 and 2023.

== Discography ==
with The Lovegods

- Between Dogs & Wolves (2004)
- Audience of One (2005)
- Collage (2021: Compilation album released on vinyl)

Solo

- Venus Gets Even (2011)
- While the Heart Beats (2016)
- MilkTeeth (2019)

with Nadeah&Beki

- “DreamBitches” EP (2020)
