= Putain =

Putain is a French word meaning "whore" or "fuck".

Putain may also refer to:

- La Putain respectueuse (English: The Respectful Prostitute), a 1952 French film
- Putain de camion, a 1988 studio album by Renaud
- "Putain putain", a song from TC Matic's 1983 album Choco
