= My Name =

My Name may refer to:

- My Name (band), from South Korea
- My Name (BoA album)
- My Name (Lena Philipsson album)
- My Name (Mélanie Pain album)
- "My Name" (McLean song)
- "My Name", a song from the musical Oliver!
- "My Name", a song by Xzibit from Man vs. Machine
- "My Name", a song by Anoop Desai from All Is Fair
- "My Name", a song by Changbin from SKZ-Replay 2026 Pt.1
- My Name (TV series), a 2021 South Korean TV series
- My Name (2026 film), a 2026 South Korean film
