= Aril Brikha =

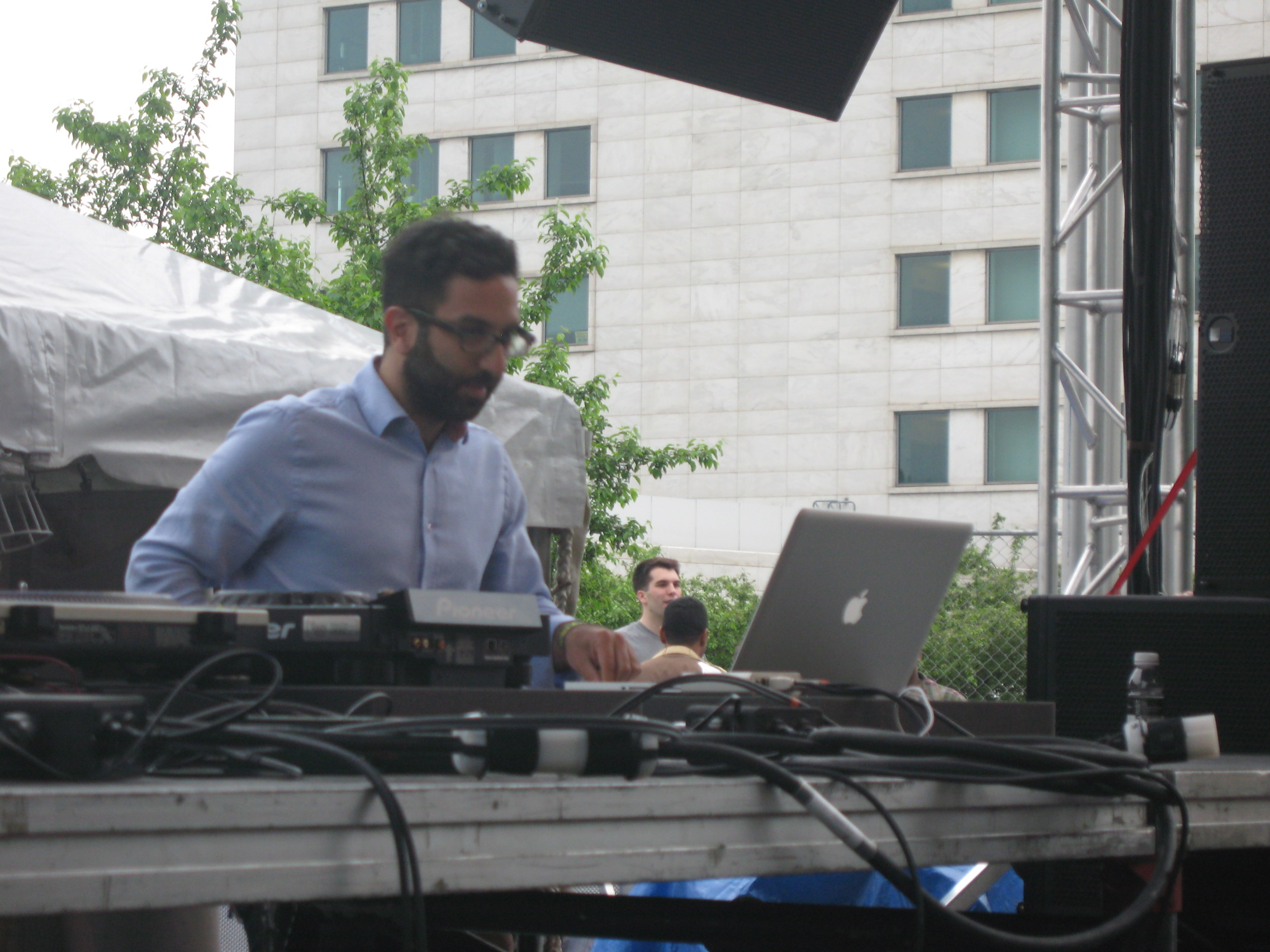
- Brikha at Detroit Detroit Electronic Music Festival in May 2011

Background information
- Also known as: Art Of Vengeance, Ataril, First Movement
- Born: 1976 (age 49–50); Tehran, Iran
- Origin: Assyrian
- Genres: Techno Music, Ambient Techno, Detroit Techno, Minimal Techno.
- Occupations: Musician, producer
- Years active: 1998-present
- Labels: Transmat, Peacefrog, Fragile, Kompakt
- Website: www.myspace.com/arilbrikha

Aril Brikha (born 1976) is an Assyrian techno musician, recognized globally for his contributions to the genre. After relocating to Sweden, he gained further recognition when he was nominated for Best Dance Album at the Swedish National Radio Gold Gala contest.

== Early life ==
Brikha was born in Iran, and grew up in Jönköping. He started playing the keyboard at the age of seven. In his early teens, he developed an interest in electronic music from artists such as Depeche Mode, Nitzer Ebb, Kraftwerk, Front 242, and Jean-Michel Jarre. By 17, Brikha started using a sequencer, and composing music. The term "Detroit Techno" was used by his friends to describe it, akin to records by Robert Hood and Berlin's Basic Channel.

== Music career ==
Brikha released his earliest material on Swedish imprints such as Dunkla, Plump, and Placktown. In 1998, he switched to the label Fragile, with the release of his Art Of Vengeance EP. Brikha tours with his live show in addition to performing at the annual Detroit Electronic Music Festival. In 2020 he released his album Dance Of A Trillion Stars on Mule Musiq. It consisted of eight songs which were slower and more trance-influenced than his other work. This was followed by the dance-floor-focused album Prisma later that year.

== Discography ==
=== Albums ===
- 2000: Departure in Time
- 2007: Ex Machina
- 2020: Dance of a Trillion Stars
- 2020: Prisma

=== 12" ===
- 1998: Art of Vengeance MP
- 1998: Art of Vengeance EP
- 2000: Deeparture in Time
- 2003: Simplicity
- 2005: Prey for Peace
- 2007: Winter EP
- 2007: Akire
- 2007: Room 337 / Kept Within
- 2007: For Mother / Lady 707
- 2010: Deeparture in Time - The Remixes
- 2011: Forever Frost
- 2011: Palma
- 2012: Definition of D EP
