= Parekh & Singh =

Indian dream pop duo

- Also known as: Nischay Parekh, Zap
- Origin: Kolkata, West Bengal, India
- Genres: Dream pop; Indie folk
- Years active: 2011–2025
- Label: Peacefrog
- Spinoffs: TV Dinner
- Spinoff of: The Monkey in Me
- Past members: Nischay Parekh; Jivraj Singh; Pedro Zappa; George Dylan
- Website: www.parekhandsingh.com

Parekh & Singh was an Indian dream pop duo from the city of Kolkata in West Bengal. The duo consisted of Nischay Parekh (vocals, guitar, synths) and Jivraj Singh (drums, electronics). The band released three studio albums: Ocean (2013), Science City (2018) and The Night is Clear (2022).

== History ==
=== Background ===
The two met as teenagers, although they had both attended La Martiniere for Boys. Parekh, who was introduced to pop music by his mother, attended classes at the Berklee College of Music in Boston, Massachusetts, United States, before returning to India and relocating to Kolkata to pursue a career in music and songwriting. Singh, meanwhile, was raised in a musical household; both parents were singers and musicians that would often tour and perform in cover bands. Prior to the two playing together, Parekh sang and played guitar in a self-described "experimental pop" band, The Monkey In Me. The band formed in 2009, while Parekh was still in high school.

=== Formation, early years and Ocean (2011–2015) ===
Initially, the duo performed under the banner of Nischay Parekh in 2011. Although it was ostensibly Parekh's solo project, Singh was a constant collaborator and appeared alongside Parekh for photos and performances. They released an album, Ocean, independently in 2013. The album featured contributions from Singh on drums and percussion, Pedro Zappa on bass and George Matthew Dylan Varner-Hartley (AKA George Dylan) on piano and keyboards. Ocean was well-received in India, with Rolling Stone India naming it as one of the best Indian albums of the year. Two singles were released from the album: "I Love You Baby, I Love You Doll" and "Panda." The duo were then briefly known as Zap in 2014, before changing their name to Parekh & Singh in 2015; inspired by acts such as Simon & Garfunkel and Hall & Oates. By this point, bassist Zappa had moved on to other projects and keyboardist Varner-Hartley had relocated to Canada, thus officially making the project a duo again.

=== Ocean re-release (2015–2017) ===
The band re-released Ocean under their new name in October 2016 on Peacefrog, a British indie label. Parekh & Singh then re-released the single "I Love You Baby, I Love You Doll." Its music video, which was shot on a US$5000 (INR₹322324) budget, featured an aesthetic influenced by the American film director Wes Anderson. It has since garnered over 2,000,000 views on YouTube, considered to be a significant feat for an Indian indie band. Two more singles were released from the album: "Philosophize" in November 2016, and "Ghost" in May 2017. A music video for the latter, directed by Mischa Ghose, also achieved over two million views on YouTube.

=== Science City (2018–2022) ===
Parekh & Singh finished touring in support of Ocean in February 2018. A month later, the band posted to Facebook to state that new music was imminent. In November 2018, after several teasers via social media, the band released a new single entitled "Summer Skin." The song was premiered on VICE India, and was later selected as one of Rolling Stone India's favourite songs of the year. A music video for the song was released in January 2019, which has since accumulated over 280,000 views.

On January 26, 2019, the band released the single "Hello." It was then revealed that both it and "Summer Skin" would be a part of the band's second studio album. The album was titled Science City, so named after an amusement park in Kolkata. The album was released on April 26 via Peacefrog Records. A third single, entitled "Crystalline," was released on March 15.

While the band were unable to tour over the COVID-19 pandemic, they performed several live-streamed home concerts. They also shared a new stand-alone single in 2020, which was a cover of Radiohead's "Karma Police". In January 2022, they also shared a new single entitled "Chhan Chhan Chhan", which was written for the soundtrack of the Indian dramedy Kaun Banegi Shikharwati. It featured Delhi singer-songwriter Kamakshi Khanna.

=== The Night is Clear, hiatus, and disbandment (2022–2025) ===
In January 2022, the band shared their first proper single in nearly three years, "Je Suis La Pomme Rouge". The band confirmed upon its release that it would serve as the lead single from their then-untitled third studio album. A second single, "Sleepyhead", followed in March. In August 2022, the band shared "The Nightingale" on the 18th and surprise released their third album The Night is Clear on the 29th. A national tour in support of the album followed in October and November 2022. Following a final show at Lollapalooza in Mumbai, the band undertook a hiatus in January 2024. Parekh has since launched a new solo project, under the moniker of TV Dinner.

In February 2025, the duo announced their disbandment on a now-deleted Instagram post. They split due to "a diversion of interests and ambitions", with the band's Instagram page now documenting Nischay's solo projects.

== Discography ==
Albums

- Ocean (2013; re-released 2016 as Parekh & Singh)
- Science City (2019)
- The Night is Clear (2022)

Singles

- "I Love You Baby, I Love You Doll" (2013; re-released 2016)
- "Panda" (2014)
- "Philosophize" (2016)
- "Ghost" (2017)
- "Summer Skin" (2018)
- "Hello" (2019)
- "Crystalline" (2019)
- "Drum Machine" (2019)
- "Chhan Chhan Chhan" with Kamakshi Khanna (2022)
- "Je Suis la Pomme Rouge" (2022)
- "Sleepyhead" (2022)
- "The Nightingale" (2022)
- "C C C" (2023)
