= Latin Lover (film) =

- Directed by: Cristina Comencini
- Written by: Cristina Comencini; Giulia Calenda
- Produced by: Lionello Cerri
- Starring: Virna Lisi; Marisa Paredes; Angela Finocchiaro; Valeria Bruni Tedeschi; Candela Peña; Pihla Viitala; Nadéah
- Cinematography: Italo Petriccione
- Edited by: Francesca Calvelli
- Music by: Andrea Farri
- Release dates: 7 February 2015 (Berlin); 19 March 2015 (Italy)
- Running time: 104 minutes
- Country: Italy
- Language: Italian

Latin Lover is a 2015 Italian comedy-drama film written and directed by Cristina Comencini. It marked the last cinema appearance of Virna Lisi. The film received four nominations at the 2015 David di Donatello Awards, for best actress (Lisi), best costumes (Alessandro Lai), best makeup (Ermanno Spera) and best hairstyling (Alberta Giuliani).

== Plot ==
Upon the tenth anniversary of the death of fictional film star Saverio Crispo, his four daughters get together in the family manor in Apulia, Southern Italy. As Saverio used to be at the top of his game as an internationally known film star, he had liaisons with different women across the world, thus having several love children. His children include his Italian daughter, Susanna, who is secretly engaged to Walter, the former editor of Saverio's latest movies, his French daughter, Stéphanie, a mother of three sons from different men, his Spanish daughter, Segunda, the only one being married, and his youngest daughter, Solveig, from Sweden, who had little to no contact with her late father. None of the four women got to really know their late father, but each of them has fabricated an idealized and very personal memory of him.

Saverio's two widows, the Italian-born Rita and the Spanish-born Ramona, are also present at the family reunion. The meeting happens as Saverio's hometown celebrates the late actor's life and achievements, but apparently many secrets are yet to be unveiled about his life and his family.

== Cast ==
- Virna Lisi as Rita
- Marisa Paredes as Ramona
- Valeria Bruni Tedeschi as Stéphanie
- Angela Finocchiaro as Susanna
- Candela Peña as Segunda
- Pihla Viitala as Solveig
- Nadeah Miranda as Shelley
- Francesco Scianna as Saverio Crispo
- Jordi Mollà as Alfonso
- Neri Marcorè as Walter
- Claudio Gioè as Marco Serra
- Lluís Homar as Pedro
- Toni Bertorelli as Picci

== Trivia ==
Final film of Virna Lisi. She was already very ill from cancer during production and died shortly after. The film is dedicated to her in the end credit.

== See also ==
- List of Italian films of 2015
