= My Name (Mélanie Pain album) =

Studio album by Mélanie Pain
- Released: April 19, 2009 (Australia, New Zealand); April 21, 2009 (Europe)
- Recorded: 2007–2009
- Genre: Indie pop, French pop
- Length: 38:41
- Label: 101 Distribution
- Producer: Mélanie Pain, Marc Collin, Villenueve

Professional ratings
Review scores
Source	Rating
ZME Music	(8/10)

My Name is the debut album by French singer-songwriter Mélanie Pain. After singing for new wave band Nouvelle Vague, Pain completed recording her first album, releasing it on April 21, 2009.

== Track listing ==
All tracks written by Mélanie Pain.

1. My Name – 4:36
2. Celle de mes vingt ans (One of My Twenty Years) – 3:20
3. Bruises – 3:48
4. Everything I Know – 3:01
5. Helsinki (feat. Julien Doré) – 5:09
6. La cigarette – 3:48
7. Little Cowboy – 1:29
8. If You Knew – 3:27
9. Ignore-moi (Ignore Me) – 3:08
10. Peut-être pas (Maybe Not) – 3:13
11. Adieu mon amour (Goodbye, My Love) – 3:36
