= Jenia Lubich =

Russian singer (born 1984)

Jenia Lubich Женя Любич
- Also known as: Jenia Lubich
- Born: 20 March 1984 (age 42); Leningrad, Russian SFSR, Soviet Union
- Genres: Pop, rock, acoustic, lounge
- Years active: 1998–present
- Labels: Naïve, Peacefrog, Perfect Kiss
- Website: http://www.jenialubich.com

Evgeniya Dmitrievna "Jenia" Lubich (Russian: Евгения Дмитриевна "Женя" Любич, born 20 March 1984) is a Russian singer-songwriter who performs and writes in English, Russian, French and Spanish. Her work encompasses recording, song-writing, session performance, live performance, and TV performance.

== Biography ==
Background

Born in Leningrad, USSR, now Saint Petersburg, Russia, Lubich attended school in Leningrad/Saint Petersburg and graduated from Smolny College Liberal Arts and Sciences with a major in music.

Primarily a solo artist, Jenia has worked with groups, as a session singer and musician. In 2009, she joined the French group Nouvelle Vague.

Early years

When Jenia was 12, she took vocal lessons and by 1998 was performing classical repertoire in Russia, Finland and Hungary. In 2000, she studied modern vocals, piano, music history, music & art criticism in Russia and the USA. By the time she had graduated, she had changed her musical style from classical to modern, and had begun to write and perform her own songs.

Commercial developments

From 2004, Jenia performed with her songs, giving concerts in various cities. In 2005, she was interviewed for Vesti Petersburg TV, and reviewed in Neva News (Saint Petersburg's first English Language newspaper) article Music of the Present.

In 2006, Jenia began working on new productions and her song Ville de France appeared among the tracks of De-Phazz, VFSix and Incognito on a Nu Lounge CD collection, released by Nu Note, Moscow. In July of the same year, Jenia took part in a 'Baltic Stars' music contest, hosted by I.B. Records, and won 1st prize – a trip to Hollywood in August 2007 – to compete as a vocalist in the World Championships of Performing Arts 'World Stars' . For performances of her own songs, she was awarded a WCOPA medal and two bronze medals.

Production work

In April 2008, one of Jenia's favorite music bands, French new wave/lounge group, Nouvelle Vague, formed by music producers Marc Collin and Olivier Libaux, performed in Saint Petersburg. After their concert, Jenia passed a CD of her songs to Collin, the producer, composer and recording artiste (Nouvelle Vague, Air, Tuxedomoon, Café del Mar). He liked her voice and invited Jenia to Paris to record. As a result, the third Nouvelle Vague album NV3 features 2 songs, Marooned and Aussi Belle Qu'une Balle.

In October 2008, Jenia recorded an aria of Violetta Addio Del Passato Bei Sogni Ridenti from Verdi's Traviata for the Private Domain project by Iko & Marc Collin, commissioned by Naïve Music. In April 2009, she sang the aria for Radio France Internationale in the programme broadcast Les Musiques Du Monde.

In July 2009, Jenia presented her songs, accompanied by piano and guitar in Paris, at the music club, Le Reservoir. Also in summer 2009, she performed with Nouvelle Vague in France, Belgium and Canada, for the special French project Les Francofolies – a festival held in French-speaking countries. and at the NuNote Festival in Moscow (August 2009). She continued working with Nouvelle Vague, taking part in their shows in Vannes (France), Cesme (Turkey), Saint Petersburg (Russia), Helsinki (Finland).

Later activities

In Autumn 2009, Lubich participated in Nouvelle Vague's "French Tour", which had started in the famous concert hall Olympia in Paris and continued in different French, Flemish and Swiss cities of France. While touring, Marc Collin and Lubich were invited to a Swiss TV programme "Le Talk", where Lubich sang "Aussi Belle Q'une Balle", accompanied by her guitar. During winter 2009, Lubich continued to focus on her solo recording project, an album of her own English, French and Russian songs, together with Marc Collin, as well as give live performances featuring her own songs.

In Spring 2010, she gave an interview for a Colombian radio station Radionica, where songs "Russian Girl" and "Way Out" were broadcast. In May 2010, Lubich took part in the Transmusicales Festival, hosted by Light Music, where she sang her songs with musicians from St. Petersburg and Marc Collin. In June 2010, she performed at the Zal Ojidania Club (St. Petersburg) as support to famous Canadian band Caribou. In August 2010, Lubich gave an interview to Seva Gakkel (ex-musician of well-known Russian band Aquarium) on his radio programme "Priznaki Vremeni" (Signs of the Time). Also in August, Lubich participated in Nouvelle Vague's show at the Kubana-Fest (Russia). She then appeared on a limited edition "Best Of", double CD album by Nouvelle Vague, released in France, during that summer, in the songs "Aussi Belle Q'une Balle" and "Marooned". She also appeared on an EP by Nicolas Comment, as guest backing vocalist. Her song Колыбельная тишины (Lullaby of Silence) was featured in the film Он – дракон (I Am Dragon), and later appeared on her 2016 studio album Снежно (Snowy).

== Recordings ==
=== Albums ===
- 2011 — C'est la vie (That's Life)
- 2015 — Азбука Морзе (Morse Code)
- 2016 — Снежно (Snowy)
- 2020 — Во весь голос (At the Top of My Voice)
- 2023 — Будь что будет (Come What May)

=== EPs ===
- 2010 — Russian Girl
- 2012 — Степной волк (Steppe Wolf)
- 2013 — Напролёт (All the Way)
- 2013 — Double Nature (feat. Neon Lights)

=== Singles ===
- 2012 — Джентльмены удачи / Метелица (Gentlemen of Fortune / Blizzard)

=== Collaborations ===
With Iko & Marc Collin

- Private Domain (Naïve Music, France, 2008): tracks Addio del Passato Bei Sogni Ridenti from Traviata by Giuseppe Verdi

With Nouvelle Vague

- NV3 (Perfect Kiss/PIAS, France, 2009): tracks Marooned and Aussi Belle Q'une Balle
- The Singers (New Sound Dimensions, 2010): track Galaxy
- Couleurs sur Paris (2010): track La Crise economique!

With Nicolas Comment

- Nous etions Dieu (back-vocal in 1–5)

With Malik Alary

- La Musique du Faubourg (2011): track Everlasting Roads

With Stephane Pompougnac

- Day & Night (2011): track Morning Flow by Malik Alary feat. Jenia Lubich

With Naiv

- Populism (2015): track Прощай (Goodbye)

=== Compilations ===
- Nu Lounge (Nu Note/WWW Records, Russia, 2006): track Ville de France (written & sung by Jenia Lubich)
- На высоте (On High, Philological & Eastern Department, Saint Petersburg State University, 2001): track По весне (In the spring, written & sung by Jenia Lubich)
- Мой навеки (My Forever, Philological & Eastern Department, Saint Petersburg State University, 2002): track Питер (Piter, written & sung by Jenia Lubich)
- Re:Аквариум (Re:Aquarium, tribute to Aquarium, 2012): track Winter

=== Broadcasts ===
- Les Musiques Du Monde (Radio France Internationale, April 2009)
