= Meeco =

German musician (born 1976)

Meeco is a music producer and composer who has worked and recorded with a range of well-known artists from various genres, including jazz, hip-hop, soul, pop, and Latin. He is known for moving between different styles of music, blending jazz improvisations with hip-hop and soul.

== Collaborations ==
Meeco has released six albums, with a seventh to be released in 2024. Amargo Mel (2009) and Perfume e Caricias (2010) came out on the German label Connector and on the US label Spectra Jazz. His third album, Beauty of the Night (released in April 2012), features performances by Brazilian singer Eloisia (Nouvelle Vague), Freddy Cole, Joe Bataan, Gregory Porter, Lionel Loueke, and Jane Birkin. In 2015, he released Souvenirs of Love on the established Jazz label "Double Moon Records".

== Discography ==
- Amargo Mel (2009) with Eva Ventura, Eloisia, Olvido Ruiz Castellanos, Rolando Faria, Reggie Moore, Guilherme Castro, Rolo Rodriguez and featuring Ron Carter, Hubert Laws, Eddie Henderson, David “Fathead” Newman, Charlie Mariano, David Friedman (percussionist), Bob Lenox, Mario "El Indio" Morejon
- Perfume e Caricias (2010) featuring Eloisia, Eddie Henderson, Kenny Barron, Buster Williams, James Moody, Vincent Herring
- Beauty of the Night (2012) featuring Eloisia, Freddy Cole, Gregory Porter, Joe Bataan, Zé Manoel, Jane Birkin, Hubert Laws, Eddie Henderson, Benny Golson, Bennie Maupin, Kenny Barron, Lionel Loueke, Romero Lubambo, Stefon Harris, Jaques Morelenbaum, Buster Williams, Victor Lewis
- Souvenirs of Love (2015) with Mary Stallings, Hubert Laws, Buster Williams, Eddie Henderson, Wallace Roney, Vincent Herring, Victor Lewis, Yahzarah, Jean Baylor (Zhané), Casey Benjamin, Aaron Marcellus, Jaques Morelenbaum, Kirk Whalum, Eric Reed, Stefon Harris, Lionel Loueke, John Scofield, Richard Bona
- We Out Here (2020) with Smif-N-Wessun, Masta Ace, Lil Fame, Termanology, Big Shug, Sadat X, El Da Sensei
- We Run Shit (2023) with Inspectah Deck, Havoc, Fredro Starr, Elzhi, Ras Kass, Lil Fame, Fashawn, Termanology, Grafh, JD Era, Rasco
