= Inna Modja =

Malian-French musical artist (born 1984)

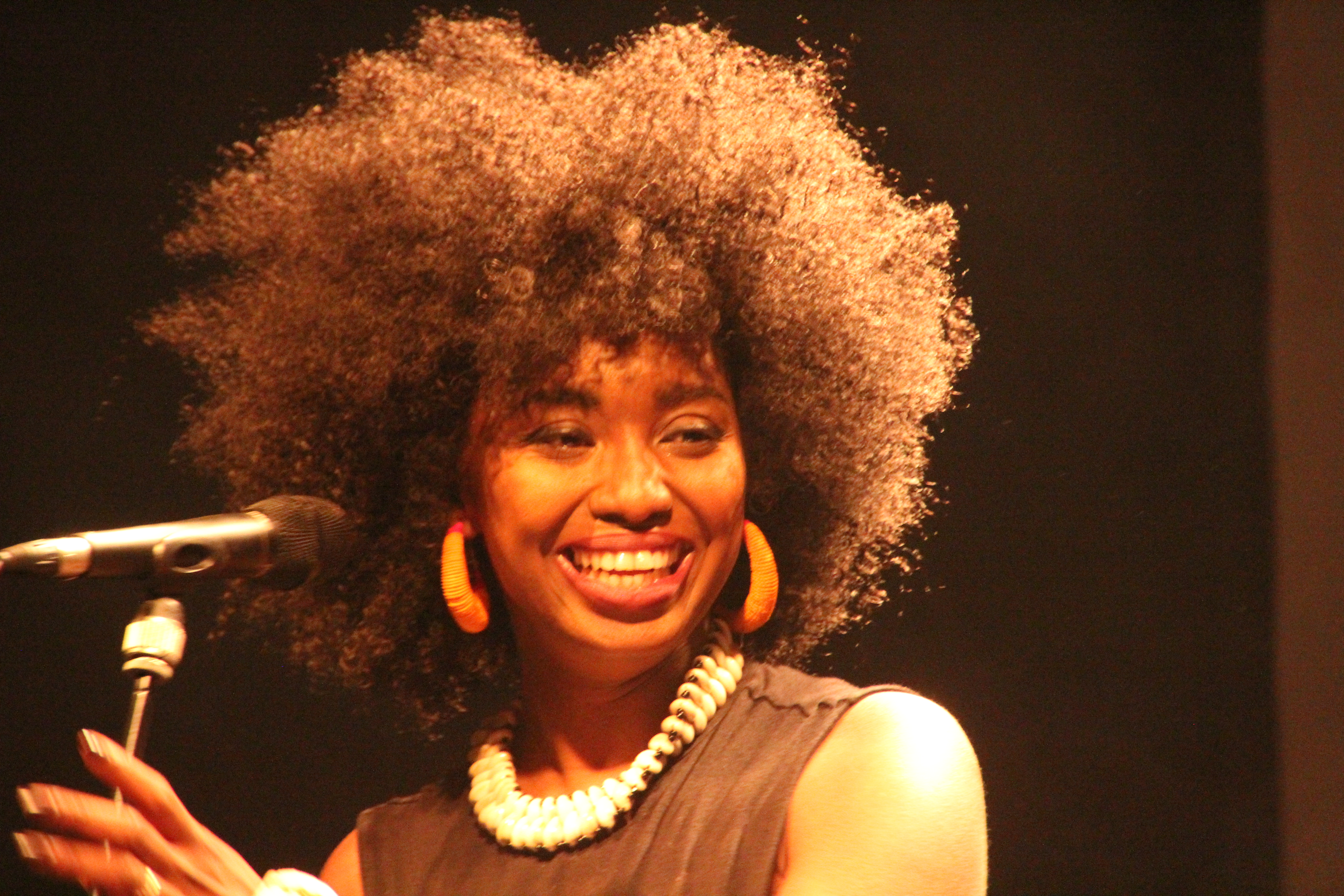

Background information
- Born: Inna Bocoum; May 19, 1984 (age 42)
- Origin: Bamako, Mali
- Genres: Pop, dance-pop
- Occupation: Singer
- Instrument: Vocals
- Years active: 2009–present
- Label: Warner Music Group
- Website: innamodja.net

Inna Bocoum, also known as Inna Modja (born May 19, 1984), is a Malian-French female singer and model. "Modja" means "bad, not good" in Fulfulde.

== Childhood and adolescence ==
Born on May 19, 1984, in Bamako, Mali, in a Fula family, the sixth of seven children, Inna Bocoum owes her artist name to her mother, who gave her the nickname of Inna Modja, which means "Inna is bad" or "Inna is not good" in Fulfulde. Her mother tongue is Bambara. When she was six, her parents enrolled her in a choir. At home, her father encouraged her to progress by playing her some records he liked (artists such as Ray Charles, Ella Fitzgerald, Otis Redding, Sarah Vaughan). She was also influenced by her older siblings, who transitioned into Thrash Punk, '80/'90s Rap, Heavy Metal periods, in addition to Blues, Soul and Disco. As a teenager, she still alternated between Hard rock and love songs. She regularly visited her neighbour, Salif Keita, who invites her to be part of the Rail Band of Bamako, a group of swinging old men (Bossa Nova and Jazz), amongst whom he himself debuted.

She speaks against female genital mutilation, as she herself and her four sisters were circumcised without their parents' approval, an event she sang about in one of her songs. She since had reconstructive surgery by Ghada Hatem-Gantzer. She's also outspoken against violence against women, which she portrayed in the music video of her song "La Valse de Marylore."

== 2009: Early career and Everyday is a New World ==
She was very impressed by Janet Jackson as a role model. She settled on a Pop and Soul sound. After appearing on a Fête de la Musique special TV show produced by France 2 singing a duet with Jason Mraz on his song "Lucky", Inna Modja opened for Sliimy on several of his shows. She released her first single, "Mister H", which is included on her first album "Everyday is a New World", itself released in October 2009. She supported it with appearances on several TV shows, including "Vivement Dimanche" and "Taratata".

== 2011–present: Love Revolution ==
She made a comeback in June 2011 with her new single "French Cancan (Monsieur Sainte Nitouche)". It quickly became one of the biggest Summer hits of 2011 in France and went No. 4 on the SNEP French Singles Chart. She followed this success with "La Fille du Lido", the second single off her second album "Love Revolution" which was released on November 7. She participated to the annual Téléthon, which benefits the French Association Against Myopathies. The music video for the third single, "I Am Smiling" (February 2012), was entirely made from videos from her fans.

She contributed a cover of "Souris Puisque C'est Grave" on Alain Chamfort's cover album Elles & Lui (2012), and lent her voice to the charity single "Je Reprends Ma Route", to benefit the association "Les Voix de l'enfant".

In 2018 she was part of the re-imagining, at Laurent Ruquier's inspiration, of Claude Bolling's Les Parisiennes.

Modja is a Goodwill Amabassador for the United Nations Convention to Combat Desertification (UNCCD). In 2024 she and Ricky Kej, who is a fellow musician and ambassador, released the song "Her Land". The somg was to raise the profile of the UNCCD's campaign to increase the ownership of land by women. She is also a co-founder of Code Green, an NGO that supports social and climate justice.

== Discography ==
=== Albums ===
Years	Title	Positions		Certification
Years	Title	FRA	BEL	Certification
2009	Everyday Is a New World	56	—	
2011	Love Revolution	28	98	FRA: Gold
2015	Motel Bamako	55	—	
2018	Les Parisiennes (with Arielle Dombasle, Mareva Galanter & Helena Noguerra)			

=== Singles ===
Year	Single	Peak chart positions				Album
Year	Single	BEL (WA)	CAN	FRA	SWI	Album
2009	"Mister H"	—	—	—	—	Everyday Is a New World
2010	"Life"	—	—	—	—	Love Revolution
2011	"French Cancan (Monsieur Sainte Nitouche)"	6	55	4	60	Love Revolution
2011	"La fille du Lido"	—	86	82	—	Love Revolution
2012	"I Am Smiling"	—	83	—	—	Love Revolution
2014	"Forgive Yourself"	—	—	129	—	Motel Bamako
2014	"I Want Your Sex" (Inna Modja & the Woodboyz)	—	—	—	—	
2015	"Tombouctou"	—	—	147	—	

== Awards ==
In 2023, she was nominated for the Pritzker Emerging Environmental Genius Award by Hindou Oumarou Ibrahim.

In December 2024, Inna Modja was included on the BBC's 100 Women list.
