= Putain putain =

"Putain Putain"
- 1983 Belgian vinyl single cover

Single by TC Matic

from the album Choco
- B-side: "Living On My Instinct"
- Released: 1983
- Genre: Pop, Rock, Dance
- Length: EMI
- Songwriters: Arno Hintjens, Jean-Marie Aerts

"Putain Putain" (literally "Whore whore" in French, though also a common curse word) is a 1983 song by Belgian rock group TC Matic. It was written by Arno Hintjens (known by the mononym Arno) and Jean-Marie Aerts. Released on the band's album Choco (1983), it was released as a single, with "Living On My Instinct" as the B-side. At the time, "Putain Putain" was a minor club hit in Belgium and France. It remains one of the band's biggest hits.

== Lyrics ==
"Putain Putain" is a trilingual song, mostly sung in French, but with phrases in the dialect of Ostend (a type of West Flemish, his mother tongue) and English. The lyrics are mostly a series of non-connected, silly observations. The singer claims he is not a communist, cyclist, Catholic or a "footballiste" (association football player). He mentions he likes women and boys and "like I already said: I like dicks.". Singing in the Ostend dialect he makes observations about the length and girth of penises, concluding:

"E korte dikn

Stuukt olles in stikn

E lange dinn

Doet deugd vanbinn

'k Hén e klintsje, mo 't sjhiet vérre"

(A short thick one - shoot everything to pieces - a long thin one - feels good inside - I have a small one, but it shoots far.") Returning to the French language, the singer then claims that some people talk a lot, but do little, while there are people starving from hunger. In the final verses he invites a jolly girl to take his hand, because "Saturday Night the entire world will take a bath", concluding with lines in English: The rich may be rich, the poor may be poor. They all beat the shit out of each other.".

The refrain of "Putain Putain" goes "Putain, putain, c'est vachement bien. Nous sommes quand-même tous des Européens.", loosely translating to: "Damn, damn, it's darn O.K., we're all Europeans after all.". As a joke, a female singer (Julia Lo'ko) hums Marc-Antoine Charpentier's composition "Te Deum", best known as the theme song of the Eurovision Song Contest. Interviewed by Ray Cokes in 1986, Arno explained that he feels European, because in daily life he speaks several languages. He talks French with his girlfriend and Flemish, French, English and a little German with his friends.

In 2021, Arno recorded a new version of "Putain Putain" on his solo album Vivre.

== Covers ==
"Putain Putain" has been covered by:

- Stephan Eicher
- Band Nouvelle Vague covered it in their 2010 album Couleurs sur Paris.
- Stromae interpreted the song alongside Arno during De Eregalerij 2021 in Belgium and also during Les Victoires de la musique 2021 in France. A recorded version was included in Arno's compilation album Le Coffret Essentiel released on 19 May 2014, credited as Arno featuring Stromae.
