= Eloisia =

Brazilian singer and songwriter

- Origin: Rio de Janeiro, Brazil
- Genres: Bossanova, Jazz
- Occupations: Singer and songwriter
- Years active: 2004–present

Eloisia is a Brazilian singer and songwriter, born in Rio de Janeiro, Brazil.

== Music career ==
In 2004, Eloisia began working with Marc Collin and his band Nouvelle Vague, which incorporates new wave and bossa nova music. She contributed vocals to the songs "Just Can't Get Enough" and "Love Will Tear Us Apart" on their first album, which became a worldwide indie bestseller.

In 2015, The Telegraph named the album's cover of "Just Can't Get Enough" in a list of the "50 best covers".

Eloisia also sang on three albums by German songwriter Meeco, including a duet with Gregory Porter in "Gotas de adeus" ("Tears of Farewell").

== Discography ==
=== Guest appearances ===
Year	Song	Album
2004	"Just Can't Get Enough" "Love Will Tear Us Apart"	Nouvelle Vague
2009	-	Meeco - Amargo Mel
2010	-	Meeco - Perfume e Caricias
2012	-	Meeco - Beauty of the Night
