= Nouvelle Vague (band) =

French bossa nova band

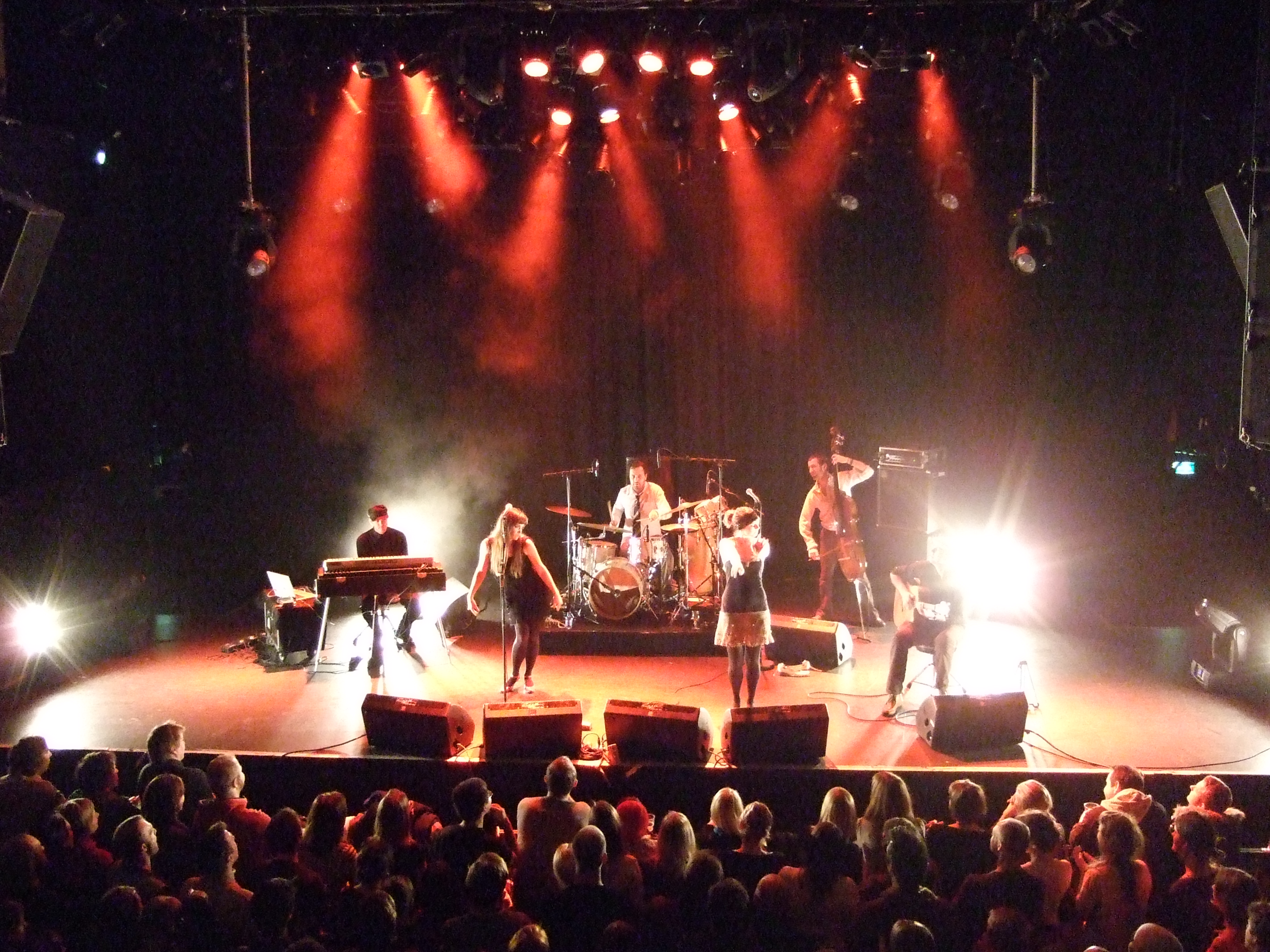
- Nouvelle Vague playing Rockefeller Music Hall, Norway in February 2007

Background information
- Origin: Paris, France
- Genres: Lounge, new wave, bossa nova
- Years active: 2003–present
- Label: PIAS Recordings
- Members: Olivier Libaux; Marc Collin; Various singers
- Past members: Various singers have included: Camille; Mélanie Pain; Nadéah Miranda; Eloisia; Phoebe Killdeer; Gerald Toto; Liset Alea; Élodie Frégé; Helena Noguerra; Mareva Galanter; Jenia Lubich

Nouvelle Vague is a French cover band led by musicians Olivier Libaux and Marc Collin. Their name means "new wave" in French, and refers simultaneously to the French New Wave cinema movement of the 1960s, to the new wave music movement of the 1970s and 1980s, which provides many of the songs that the band covers, and to bossa nova (Portuguese for "new way"), a musical style that the band frequently uses in its arrangements.

The group's recordings and live performances have featured a large rotating cast of mostly female vocalists. Several of the artists who have performed with the band have also had successful solo careers, including Camille, Phoebe Killdeer, Mélanie Pain, and Nadéah Miranda. Libaux died in 2021 but the band continues to tour.

== History ==
=== 2004: Nouvelle Vague ===
The group's first album, the self-titled Nouvelle Vague, was released in 2004. Explaining how the project came about, Libaux later said: "Marc Collin and I were both musicians and producers in the French music industry when, in 2003, Marc called me with this very strange idea of covering Love Will Tear Us Apart in a bossa nova version. I thought this idea was absolutely crazy but very exciting. So we decided to get into the studio and try it out as soon as possible. Then we did Just Can't Get Enough and Guns Of Brixton. We put the album together in just eight months. And after that we called ourselves Nouvelle Vague ... and that's the story!"

The songs on the first album were recorded with female vocalists who reportedly had not previously heard the songs they would be singing. Eight singers feature on the album in total, including Eloisia, Camille, who performs four songs, and Mélanie Pain, who sings on two tracks. The album features remakes of songs by XTC, Modern English, Killing Joke, The Clash, Joy Division, Tuxedomoon, The Cure, and The Undertones. The album was a commercial success, peaking at number 69 in the French album charts and spending a total of 39 weeks in the top 200. In 2006 it was reported that the album had sold more than 200,000 copies worldwide.

=== 2006: Bande à Part ===
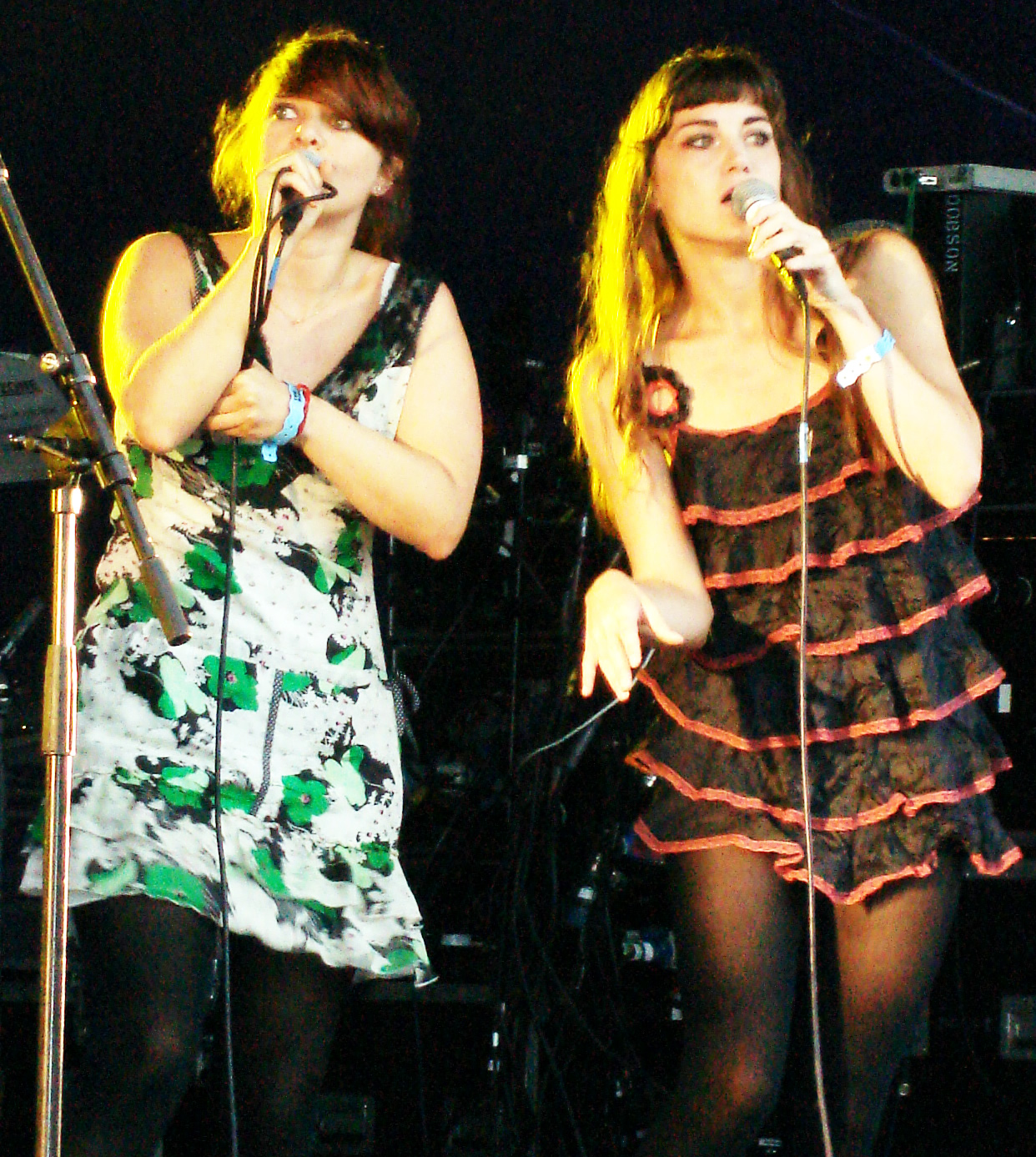
Mélanie Pain (left) and Phoebe Killdeer performing at the Big Chill Festival, 2006

The group's second album, Bande à Part, released in 2006, was again a commercial success. It charted in several European countries, peaking at number 23 in the French album charts, number 15 in the German charts, number 8 in Portugal, and reaching number 79 in the UK Albums Chart. The album includes versions of the Buzzcocks song, "Ever Fallen in Love (With Someone You Shouldn't've)", of New Order's "Blue Monday", "The Killing Moon" by Echo & the Bunnymen, "Don't Go" by Yazoo, "Eisbär" by Grauzone, and "Heart of Glass" by Blondie.

In 2008, Collin released an album titled Hollywood, mon amour, consisting of recordings made following the Nouvelle Vague formula, of songs from 1980s film soundtracks. The album includes new versions of "Eye of the Tiger" from Rocky III, and of the song "Footloose" from the 1984 film of the same name. Morcheeba's Skye Edwards performs versions of Duran Duran's James Bond theme song "A View to a Kill", and of Blondie's "Call Me" (which features in the 1980 film American Gigolo). The actress and singer Juliette Lewis performs a new arrangement of "This Is Not America" (from the 1985 film The Falcon and the Snowman). The album also features performances by the Israeli-French singer Yael Naim, by the Brazilian musician Cibelle, and by the Australian singer Nadéah Miranda, who toured with Nouvelle Vague for a time. A reviewer wrote of the album, "The results can be more than surprising – who would have thought that Arthur's Theme (Best That You Can Do) could be transformed from nauseating manufactured rubbish into something sultry, smooth and genuinely romantic?"

=== 2009: 3 ===
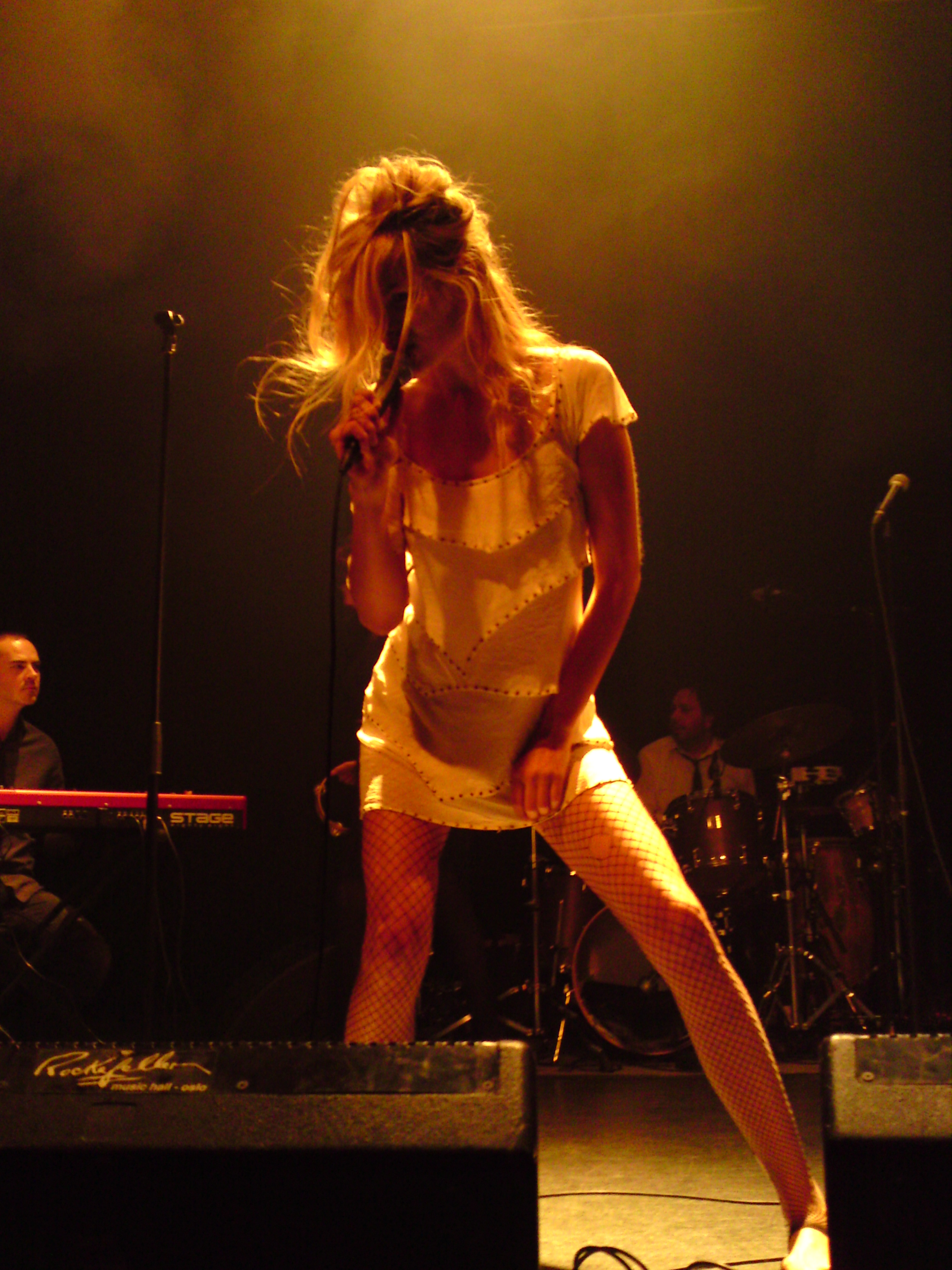
Nadeah Miranda performing with Nouvelle Vague at Rockefeller, Oslo, 10 October 2009

On 3 Depeche Mode's Martin Gore sings "Master and Servant" with Nouvelle Vague singer Mélanie Pain; Ian McCulloch of Echo & the Bunnymen duets with Pain on "All My Colours"; Marina Celeste performs "Our Lips Are Sealed" with Terry Hall of The Specials and Fun Boy Three; and Magazine's "Parade" is sung by Barry Adamson and Nouvelle Vague's Nadeah Miranda. For additional tracks that did not make the final album, Chris Bailey from Australian rockers The Saints performs a duet, likewise Samy Birnbach of Belgian new-wavers Minimal Compact.

=== 2010: Best of and Couleurs sur Paris ===
In 2010 the group released an album of French-language remakes, Couleurs sur Paris. The album features guest appearances from some well-known musicians, including Vanessa Paradis, Olivia Ruiz, and Cœur de pirate. It also features an appearance by Camille, who returns to perform a version of the song Putain putain by the Belgian band TC Matic.

In the same year, the group also released a fifteen-track Best of compilation. A special edition version of the compilation features an additional disc of rare and unreleased material.

The band's critical and commercial success peaked with the release of their second album, Bande à Part. With the release of 3 and Couleurs sur Paris, critics gave the band less attention. The band subsequently went into hiatus, releasing no new material and performing few live shows. Collin later explained this hiatus, saying, "I was bored of myself doing covers," and citing diminishing critical acclaim: "With the first and second albums, all the media said: 'This is a great idea, a great rendition' – and after the third album it was suddenly, 'OK, it's always the same thing, the same concept, we don't want to talk about it'."

=== 2016: I Could Be Happy ===
A new album I Could Be Happy was released on 4 November. The title track, a cover of the song by Altered Images, was made available for download and digital streaming on 29 September.

=== Misc ===
In 2016 it was announced that the band would be releasing an "anniversary album" and a documentary, to be titled Nouvelle Vague by Nouvelle Vague and Some Friends. The album is expected to feature "four new remixes of existing material, four previously released covers re-recorded on location with traditional musicians in China, India, Mexico and Hungary, four new covers (provisional picks are tracks by The Ramones, Cocteau Twins, The Associates and Richard Hell) and four original songs."

A new EP entitled Athol Brose was released on 2 September 2016.

== Singers ==
Several of the vocalists who have performed with Nouvelle Vague have subsequently found success as solo singers. Libaux has attributed this fact to Collin's talent for discovering female singers: "I think he is the best talent scout in the world for female singers. All the female singers we have worked with are just beginning their career. For these girls to be part of Nouvelle Vague for three years – meaning you play 200, 250 gigs – I think it's a very good way to learn about this job." The band's singers have included Camille, Phoebe Killdeer, Mélanie Pain, Nadéah Miranda, Gerald Toto, Helena Noguerra, Liset Alea, Mareva Galanter, Jenia Lubich and Élodie Frégé. In 2010 the band released a compilation featuring solo work by several of their vocalists, under the title Nouvelle Vague: The Singers. This includes Phoebe Killdeer & the Short Straws's "Fade Out Lines", which later became a major international hit when it was remixed by French producer The Avener, topping the charts in Germany, Spain, and Austria, and reaching number 3 in France and number 6 in Italy.

== Discography ==
=== Studio albums ===
- Nouvelle Vague (2004, Peacefrog)
- Bande à part (2006, Peacefrog)
- 3 (2009 Peacefrog)
- Couleurs sur Paris (2010, Kwaidan)
- Athol-Brose EP (2016, Kwaidan, digital only)
- I Could Be Happy (2016, Kwaidan)
- Algo Familiar EP (2017, Kwaidan, digital only)
- Should I Stay or Should I Go? (2024, Kwaidan)
- A Date with Depeche Mode (2026, Kwaidan)

=== Live albums ===
- Aula Magna 07.12.07 (2008, New Sound Dimensions)
- Acoustic (2009, New Sound Dimensions)

=== Compilation albums ===
- The Best of Nouvelle Vague (2009, Peacefrog)
- Best Of (2010, Peacefrog/Kwaidan)
- The Singers (2010, New Sound Dimensions), previously unreleased original songs compiled by Marc Collin
- Rarities (2019, Kwaidan, digital only)
- Curiosities (2019, Kwaidan/!K7)

=== DJ mixes by Marc Collin ===
- Late Night Tales: Nouvelle Vague (2007, Azuli)
- Coming Home (2007, Stereo Deluxe), compilation of soundtracks
- Nouvelle Vague Presents: New Wave (2007, District 6), original and cover versions of new wave songs
