= Helena Noguerra =

Belgian actress, singer and writer (born 1969)

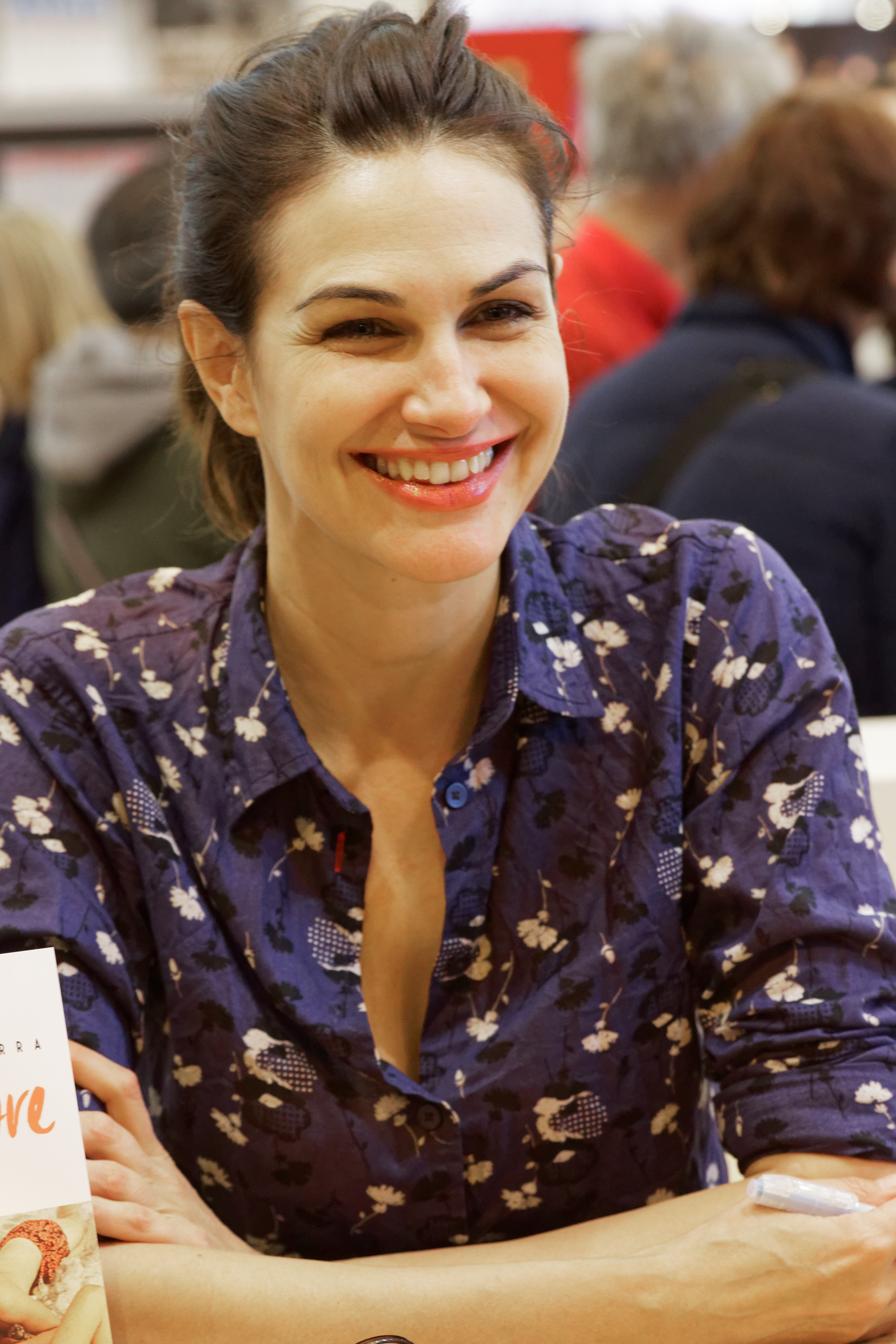
- Noguerra in 2017
- Born: Hélène Barbara Ribeiro Furtado Velho Nogueira; 18 May 1969 (age 57); Brussels, Belgium
- Occupations: Actress; singer; writer
- Years active: 1987–present
- Spouse: Philippe Katerine (m. 1999; div. 2008)
- Children: 1
- Relatives: Lio (half-sister)

Hélène Barbara Ribeiro Furtado Velho Nogueira (born 18 May 1969), known professionally as Helena Noguerra, is a Belgian actress, singer and writer.

== Career ==
Noguerra was born in Brussels, Belgium. Her songs have been used in commercials and television programmes such as Lunettes noires pour nuits blanches by Thierry Ardisson (1988–1990). She sang on the 2009 video game Bayonetta, including both the game's main theme Mysterious Destiny and a cover of Fly Me to the Moon.

In 2010 she toured with French band Nouvelle Vague.

== Personal life ==
She is the sister of singer Lio.

She has a son, Tanel Derard, born in 1991, a musician and model.

== Filmography ==
Year	Title	Role	Director	Notes
1989	La salle de bain	Woman at the Supermarket	John Lvoff	
1989	Le langage des fleurs		Manuel Boursinhac	Short
1991	Les hordes	Féline	Jean-Claude Missiaen	TV mini-series
2001	Le divin enfant	TV Host	Stéphane Clavier	TV movie
2002	If I Were a Rich Man	Priscille	Gérard Bitton & Michel Munz	
2002	Les filles, personne s'en méfie	The actress	Charlotte Silvera	
2002	Restauratec	Lady on duty	Nicolas & Bruno	TV Short
2003	Sem Ela	Inès Vieira	Anna da Palma	
2003	Je tourne avec Almodovar	Lisa	Jean-Philippe Amar	Short
2004	L'empreinte de l'ange		Christophe Reynaud	Short
2004	Alex au pays des merveilles	God's wife	Luis Inacio	Short
2005	Telma demain	Claudia	Anna da Palma	
2005	The Black Box	Soraya	Richard Berry	
2005	2013, la fin du pétrole	Laurence	Stéphane Meunier	TV movie
2006	Dans Paris	The scooter girl	Christophe Honoré	
2008	The Other One	Lars's guest	Patrick-Mario Bernard & Pierre Trividic	
2009	Salazar: A Vida Privada	Christiane Garnier	Jorge Queiroga	TV movie
2010	Mumu	Madame Rotaillot	Joël Séria	
2010	Heartbreaker	Sophie	Pascal Chaumeil	
2010	Au bas de l'échelle	Mariette	Arnauld Mercadier	TV movie
2010	Profilage	Valentine Meursault	Pascal Lahmani	TV series (1 episode)
2010	Mafiosa	Laetitia Tavera	Hugues Pagan & Éric Rochant	TV series (2 episodes)
2010	Fais pas ci, fais pas ça	Child psychiatrist	Alexandre Pidoux & Laurent Dussaux	TV series (3 episodes)
2011	L'Élève Ducobu	Adeline Gratin	Philippe de Chauveron	
2011	On ne choisit pas sa famille	Alex	Christian Clavier	
2011	Valparaiso	Emma Caglione	Jean-Christophe Delpias	TV movie
2011	À dix minutes de nulle part	Madame Stievenart	Arnauld Mercadier	TV movie
2012	La clinique de l'amour!	Priscilla	Artus de Penguern & Gábor Rassov	
2012	Les vacances de Ducobu	Adeline Gratin	Philippe de Chauveron	
2013	Turf	Christine	Fabien Onteniente	
2013	Hôtel Normandy	Alice Lecorre	Charles Nemes	
2013	La vie domestique	Inès	Isabelle Czajka	
2013	Je suis supporter du Standard	The singer	Riton Liebman	
2013	The Mark of the Angels – Miserere	Angela Colson	Sylvain White	
2013	Liga	Julia	Cristina Pinheiro	Short
2013	Zlatan	The maid	Julien Lacombe & Pascal Sid	Short
2013	What Ze Teuf	Herself	Benjamin Euvrard	TV series (1 episode)
2013	Scènes de ménages	Laura	Francis Duquet	TV series (1 episode)
2014	Fiston	Monica	Pascal Bourdiaux	
2014	Alleluia	Solange	Fabrice Du Welz	Nominated - Magritte Award for Best Supporting Actress
2014	The Kitchen in Paris		Dmitry Dyachenko	
2015	Up to Me	Eva	Dorine Hollier	Short
2015	Murders in Collioure	Alice Castel	Bruno Garcia	TV movie
2015	Cassandre	Georgia	Marwen Abdallah	TV series (1 episode)
2016	3 Mariages et un coup de foudre	Juliette	Gilles de Maistre	TV movie
2017	Bienvenue à Nimbao	Babeth	Philippe Lefebvre	TV movie
2017	J'ai retrouvé mon mojo	Helena	Nicolas Capus	Music video
2017	Le tour du Bagel	The mother	Théodore Bonnet	TV series (1 episode)
2017	Louis(e)	Agnès	Arnauld Mercadier	TV series (2 episodes)
2018	Place publique	Vanessa	Agnès Jaoui	
2018	Ce que vivent les roses	Cathy Maquart	Frédéric Berthe	TV movie
2018	Crimes Parfaits	Adèle Lacombes	Christophe Douchand	TV series (1 episode)
2019	Coup de Foudre à Saint-Petersbourg	Marie Chabrier	Christophe Douchand	TV movie
2019	Au-delà des Apparences	Alexandra Verdet	Eric Woreth	TV mini-series
2020	10 jours sans maman	Audrey	Ludovic Bernard	
2020	La Flamme	Marie-Ange	Jonathan Cohen & Jeremie Galan	TV series (1 episode)
2021	La petite femelle	Félix's mother	Philippe Faucon	TV movie
2021	Le Remplaçant	Isabelle	Nicolas Guicheteau	TV series (2 episodes)
2021	Le Chemin du bonheur	Beatriz Rojas	Nicolas Steil	
2022	Zaï zaï zaï zaï	Member of the support committee	François Desagnat	
2023	BDE	Romane	Michaël Youn	
2023	10 Days with Dad	Audrey	Ludovic Bernard	

== Theater ==
Year	Title	Author	Director
2006	Et après	Helena Noguerra & Barbara d'Alessandri	Dominique Farrugia & Barbara d'Alessandri
2007-2009	Faces	John Cassavetes	Daniel Benoin
2009	Le Roman d'un trader	Jean-Louis Bauer	Daniel Benoin
2014	Une femme	Philippe Minyana	Marcial Di Fonzo Bo
2016-2018	Vera	Petr Zelenka	Marcial Di Fonzo Bo & Élise Vigier
2018	Colette et Willy	Jean Luc Revol	Jean Luc Revol
2019	Frida	Catherine Shaub	Catherine Shaub
2020	La Reine de la piste	Pierre Notte	Pierre Notte
2020	Un dernier verre pour la route	Helena Noguerra	Catherine Shaub
2024	Frida Kahlo	Françoise Hamel	Catherine Schaub

== Discography ==
=== Albums ===
- 1998 : Projet : bikini
- 2001 : Azul
- 2004 : Née dans la nature
- 2007 : Fraise Vanille
- 2013 : Année zéro
- 2019 : Nue

=== Singles ===
- 1989 : Lunettes noires
- 1992 : Rivière des anges

=== Collaborations ===
- 1987 : La Bamba ft. Los Portos & Lio
- 1996 : Ollano ft. Nouvelle Vague
- 2003 : L'Héroïne au bain ft. Olivier Libaux
- 2004 : Jeux d'amour / La Fête ft. Rodrigo Leão, Beth Gibbons & Sakamoto
- 2005 : Le Téléfon on the album On Dirait Nino
- 2006 : Dillinger Girl et Baby Face Nelson ft. Federico Pellegrini
- 2007 : Imbécile ft. Olivier Libaux
- 2007 : Helena et Rezvani en concert ft. Serge Rezvani
- 2009 : Masquez les plumes ft. Gregory Cerkinsky, Philippe Eveno & Florence Denou
- 2010 : Theme of Bayonetta: Mysterious Destiny, Fly Me to the Moon
- 2010 : So in love ft. André Manoukian
- 2010 : C'est pas ft. François Morel
- 2014 : Rio-Paris ft. Natalie Dessay, Agnès Jaoui & Liat Cohen
- 2014 : Dans la mer aussi il y a des étoiles ft. Alain Rivet
- 2018 : Les Parisiennes ft. Arielle Dombasle, Mareva Galanter & Inna Modja

== Author ==
Year	Book	Publisher
2002	L'ennemi est à l'intérieur	Éditions Denoëll
2004	Et je me suis mise à table	Éditions Denoëll
2015	L'Incroyable Voyage de Piotr au pays des couleurs	Actes Sud Junior
2017	Ciao Amore	Groupe Flammarion
