= Mélanie Pain =

French indie pop singer from Caen

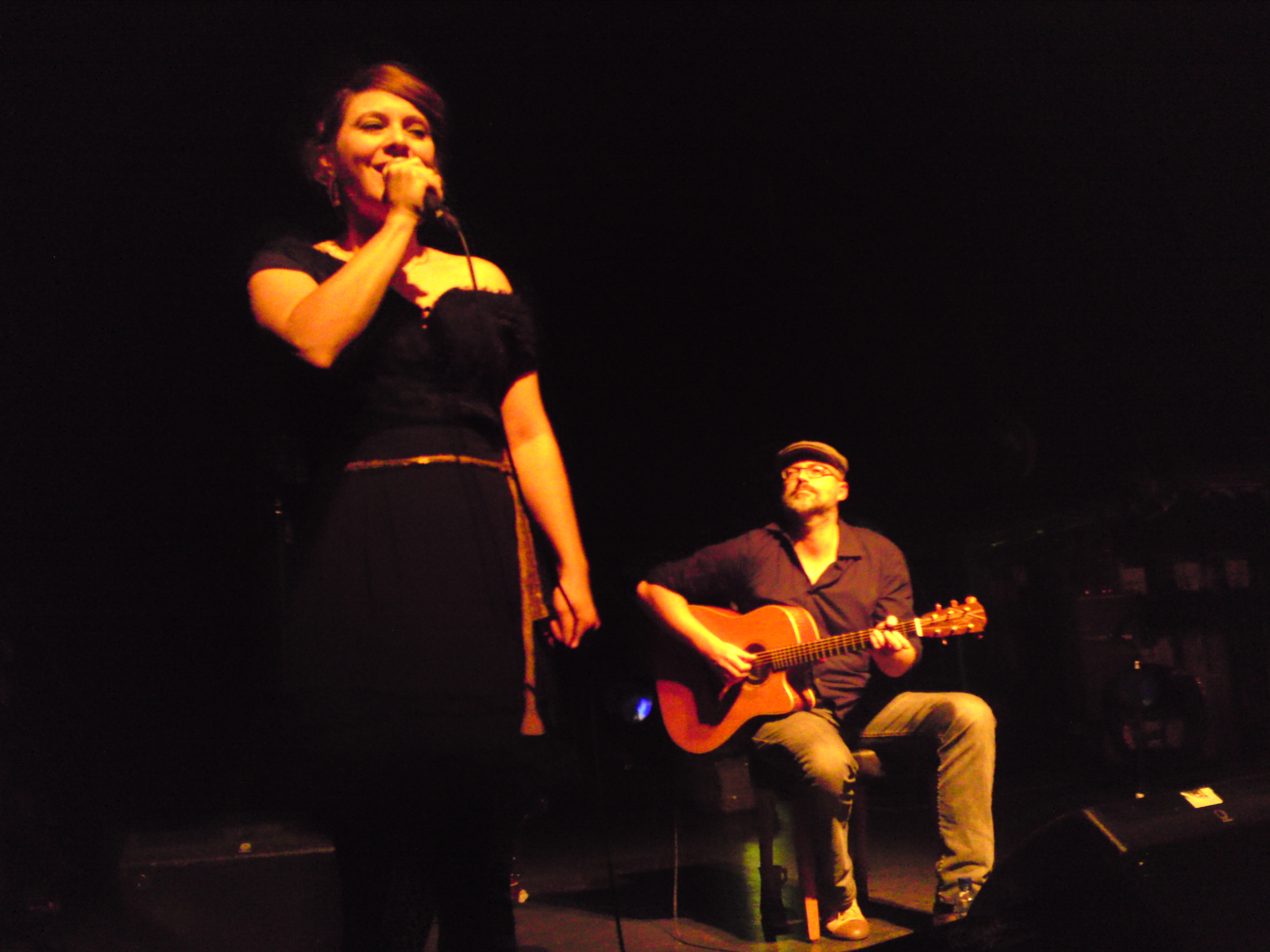
- Pain in Oslo, Norway in 2009

Background information
- Born: Mélanie Pain
- Origin: Caen, France
- Genres: New wave
- Occupations: Singer, songwriter
- Instrument: Vocals
- Years active: 2004-present
- Labels: 101 Distribution; Love
- Formerly of: Nouvelle Vague
- Website: www.melaniepain.com

Mélanie Pain is a French indie pop singer from Caen. She performs with the band Nouvelle Vague as well as being a solo artist.

== Biography ==
Hailing from Aix-en-Provence, Pain studied political sciences before moving to Paris to work in a web agency, and then a design agency. Not originally intending to be a singer, a demo she had recorded vocals on for a friend accidentally found its way into the hands of Nouvelle Vague. Subsequently, she has toured for five years with the band.

She sings in both French and English, after years of covering English songs for Nouvelle Vague. Her influences include The Pixies, Sonic Youth, PJ Harvey and Nick Drake.

In April 2009, Pain released her first solo album entitled My Name featuring artists such as Julien Doré, Phoebe Killdeer and Thomas Dybdahl.

== Discography ==
- My Name (2009)
- Bye Bye Manchester (2012)
- Parachute (2016)
- How And Why (2025)

=== With Nouvelle Vague ===
==== Singles ====
- This is Not a Love Song
- Teenage Kicks

==== Albums ====
- Bande à Part
