= Mareva Galanter =

French beauty pageant titleholder (born 1979)

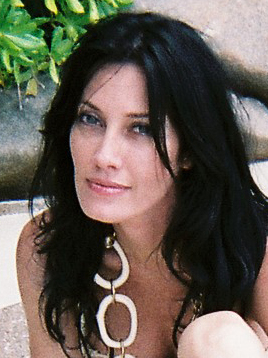
- Galanter in 2009
- Born: 4 February 1979 (age 47); Papeete, Tahiti, French Polynesia, France
- Height: 1.78 m (5 ft 10 in)
- Title: Miss France 1999; Miss World of Islands 1999; Miss Tahiti 1998

Mareva Galanter (born 4 February 1979) is a French singer, actress and beauty pageant titleholder.

Galanter won the 1998 "Miss World Islands" and the 1998 "Miss Tahiti" beauty contests. This allowed her to compete for the Miss France 1999 crown, which she won. She also competed in Miss Universe 1999, in which she did not place.

== Career ==
Galanter was born in Papeete, Tahiti, French Polynesia. By age 16, she was modeling, having done photoshoots in French Polynesia (with Dominique Petras in Bora Bora, for instance). She continued her modeling career in Europe, where she competed in and won the 1999 "Miss France" Contest. She also modeled for her partner Jean Charles de Castelbajac, designer of his own brand, living in Paris.

Galanter expanded her work into music and singing, releasing Ukuyéyé, under Warner Music, in 2006.

She has released videos for seven of her songs. She hosted Do you Do you scopitone a French TV programme on the Paris Première channel, dedicated to scopitones from the 1960s and 70s. The scopitone is the precursor to the contemporary music video.

To date, she has performed in several films, including 3 Zéros, Les Gaous, The Pink Panther and Tu Devrais Faire du Cinéma.

Galanter recorded her second album, Happy Fiu, with English band Little Barrie in 2008. She worked with singer-songwriter Rufus Wainwright, with Martin Duffy of Primal Scream and with the band Little Barrie. Jean-Charles de Castelbajac supported her with many of her texts. She toured for several months around France and within Europe.

In 2010 Galanter joined the roster of singers touring and recording with Marc Collin and Olivier Libaux's Nouvelle Vague project. According to Galanter's Twitter feed, she has recorded some material for the next Nouvelle Vague album. In 2011 she traveled to Detroit to work with producer Jim Diamond at his studio, Ghetto Recorders, and recorded 7 new songs, including Western Love, which has an accompanying video available on Vimeo.

On 5 May 2023, Galanter released the bilingual single "Une Tahitienne á Paris", which features English singer Robbie Williams.

== Personal life ==
Galanter's father is Jewish, with roots in Romania and Russia. She and her partner, French television presenter Arthur have a daughter.

== Discography ==
=== Albums ===
- 2006: Ukuyéyé
- 2008: Happy Fiu
- 2013 : Detroit Mix
- 2018: Les Parisiennes (with Arielle Dombasle, Inna Modja & Helena Noguerra)
- 2023 : Paris-Tahiti

=== Singles ===
- "Miss U"

== Filmography ==
- Vaiana - Sina (2016)
