= Phoebe Killdeer =

Australian musician

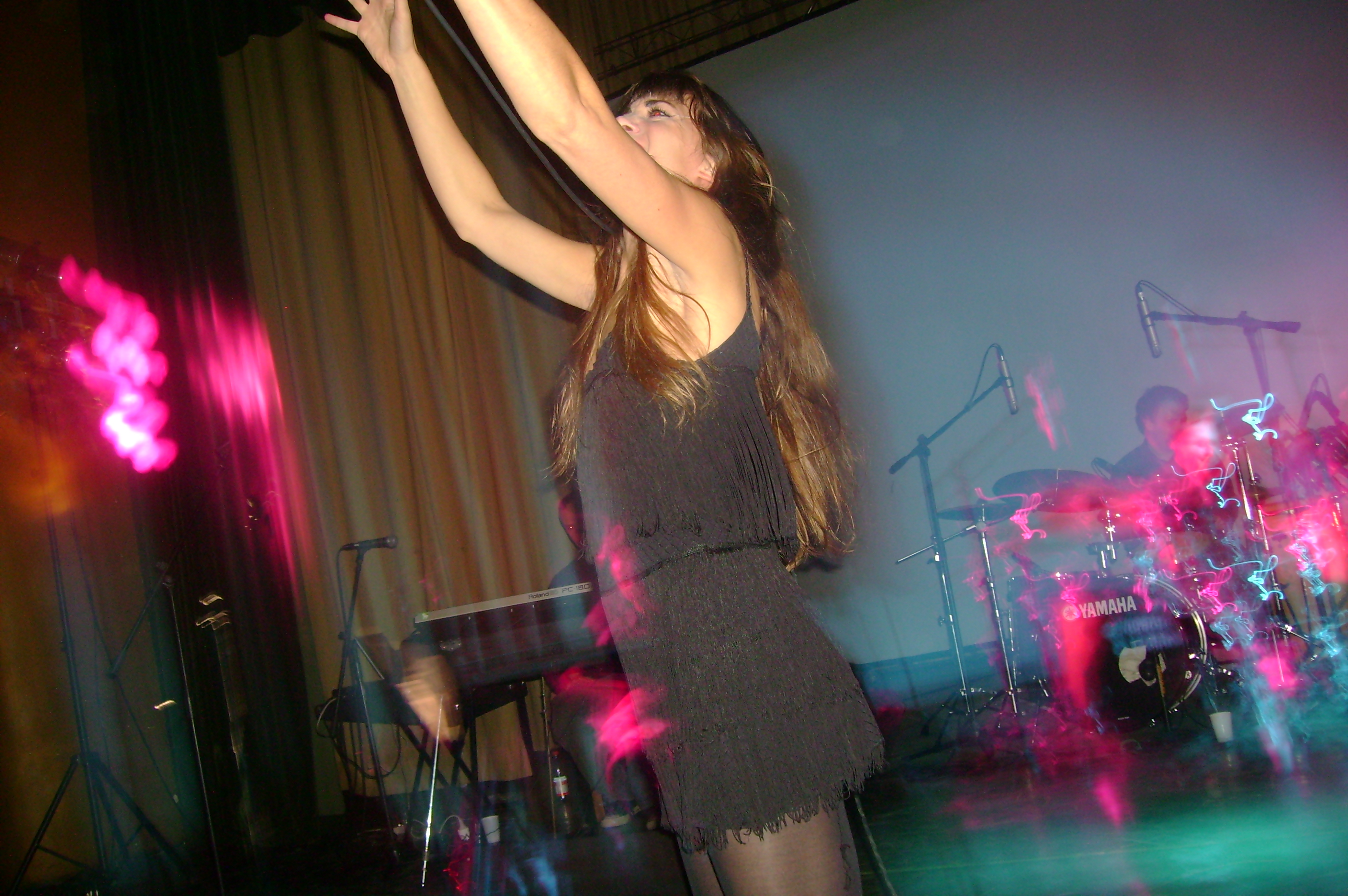
- Killdeer performing with Nouvelle Vague, 2007

Background information
- Born: 1977 (age 48–49); Antibes, France
- Occupations: Musician, singer

Phoebe Killdeer (born 1977) is a French-Australian producer, songwriter and the lead singer of the groups Phoebe Killdeer & the Short Straws and Phoebe Killdeer & the Shift. She is best known for her song "The Fade Out Line", which became a major international hit in 2014 when a reworked version of it was released by the deep house producer The Avener retitled as "Fade Out Lines".

== Life and career ==
Killdeer was born in Antibes, South of France in 1977 to Australian parents. She became known performing with the French new wave covers band Nouvelle Vague. She appears on their second album, Bande à Part (2006), and she also toured with the group. She also features on the Basement Jaxx song "Tonight", on their album Kish Kash (2003), and on the Zero dB track "Sunshine Lazy", on the album Bongos, Bleeps and Basslines (2006).

Following her work with Nouvelle Vague, Killdeer went on to pursue a solo career, forming the band The Short Straws, and releasing her first album, Weather's Coming, in 2008. Killdeer's second album with the group, Innerquake, was released in 2011. Killdeer's musical style is influenced by Tom Waits and by 1960s rock and blues; her voice has been compared to that of Peggy Lee and of PJ Harvey.

A song from the second album, "The Fade Out Line", was subsequently reworked by the French deep house producer The Avener (Tristan Casara). It was released in September 2014 under the slightly altered title, "Fade Out Lines". The song charted in several countries, reaching number one in Germany, Spain, and Austria, and reaching number 3 in France, and number 6 in Italy.

Killdeer later moved to Berlin where she began a new project, Phoebe Killdeer & the Shift, featuring Thomas Mahmoud-Zahl and Ole Wulfers. Their first album, The Piano's Playing the Devil's Tune (2016), is an experimental collaboration with the Portuguese actress and singer Maria de Medeiros (best known for playing the girlfriend of Bruce Willis's character in the 1994 film Pulp Fiction). The album was released on the Leipzig-based label Altin Village & Mine.

== Discography ==
Phoebe Killdeer & the Short Straws

- Weather's Coming (2008)
- Innerquake (2011)

Phoebe Killdeer & the Shift

- The Piano's Playing the Devil's Tune (2016) – with Maria de Medeiros
- All is Going Well (2025)

Them There

- Love is an elevator (2019)

Kill The Pain

- Kill The Pain (2023)

Nouvelle Vague

- Bande A Part (2006)
- Rareties (2019)
- Curiosities (2019)
- Should I Stay Or Should I Go? (2024)

Basement Jaxx

- Track: Tonight (2003)

Zero dB

- Track: Conga Madness (2006)
- Track: Sunshine Lazy (2006)

Agoria

- Track: Embrace (2019)
