= Marc Collin =

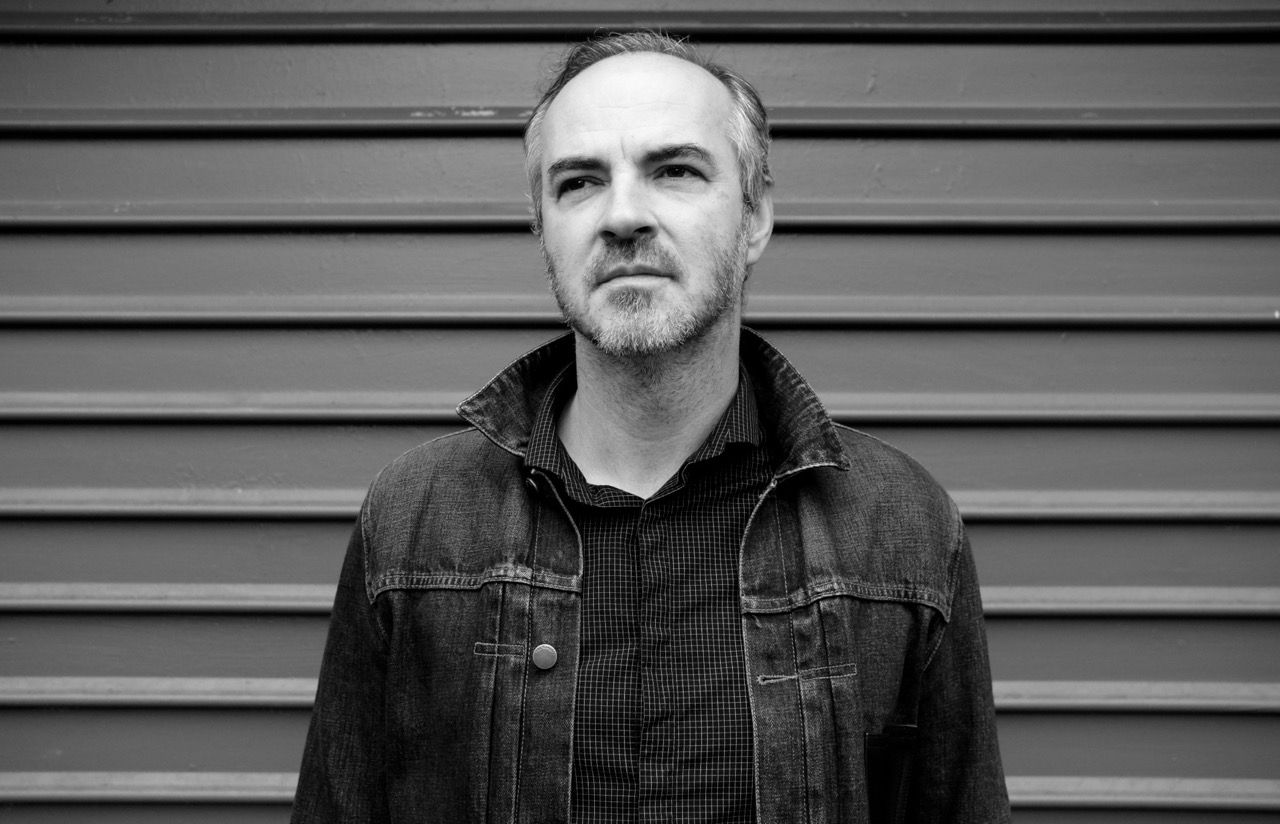

Background information
- Genres: Pop, rock, electronic
- Occupations: Musician, composer, producer
- Instrument: Keyboards
- Member of: Nouvelle Vague

Marc Collin is a French musician, film music composer and record producer born April 8, 1968 in Paris, France. He is best known as the founder, with Olivier Libaux, of the project Nouvelle Vague, a cover band that covers new wave songs in a bossa nova style. Collin also released a side-project album in 2008 under his own name, titled Hollywood, mon amour, consisting of covers, on the Nouvelle Vague formula, of songs from 1980s film soundtracks. Collin stated that he did not embark on the project out of nostalgia for the films, but because he was drawn to the challenge of transforming extremely well-known hits into intimate tracks.

Collin has worked on several film soundtracks, notably that of 1998's Les Kidnappeurs, directed by Graham Guit. The main theme of Collin's score was included in collections such as Café del Mar Volume 6.

He collaborated with the Lebanese singer Yasmine Hamdan as a co-writer and producer on her album Ya Nass (2012).

Collin cited as influences, "The post-punk bands like The Cure, New Order, and also the labels like Factory, Crammed, Les Disques du Crépuscule. All these people that have created an attitude that makes other people discover artwork other than music." He cited Radiohead's Kid A (2000) as a favourite album.

== Original movie soundtracks ==
- 1998: Les Kidnappeurs, dir. Graham Guit
- 2002: Les pétroleuses, project for an imaginary film
- 2003: Man with a Movie Camera for the 1929 silent film by Dziga Vertov
- 2005: Riviera, dir. Anne Villacèque
- 2006: J'aurais voulu etre un danseur dir. Alain Berliner
- 2010: White Wall dir. James Boss
- 2011: Kyss mig, Swedish film directed by Alexandra Therese Keining
