= Peacefrog Records =

British independent record label

- Founded: 1991
- Founder: Peter Hutchison; Paul Ballard
- Genre: Various
- Country of origin: England
- Location: London
- Official website: www.peacefrog.com

Peacefrog Records is a British independent record label based in London, England. The label produces releases in many different styles of electronic music, as well as branching out into folk and indie artists such as José González, Nouvelle Vague and Little Dragon. The label was started by Pete Hutchison and Paul Ballard in 1991. After the Lodger 303 EP, Ballard withdrew from Peacefrog Records. The record label subsequently released a number of techno records, by artists including Luke Slater, Moodymann and Suburban Knight.

The label has built up a following over the years, increased by the mainstream success of José González and has become synonymous for synching many of its recently signed artists music to film and television. Notable examples of this include the 2006 Sony Bravia "Balls" (José González) and in 2011, Twinings "Sea" (Charlene Soraia). Both artists enjoyed top 10 single success as a consequence. José González's album, Veneer, was certified platinum in 2006 and Charlene Soraia's "Wherever You Will Go", was certified gold in 2012 with sales in excess of 500,000. Other artists signed to the label who have enjoyed commercial success include Nouvelle Vague, who achieved sales of over one million worldwide over the three albums recorded for the label. Peacefrog is also an active and successful music publishing company.

== Past and present musicians ==
- Alton Miller
- Anthony Nicholson
- Aril Brikha
- Charlene Soraia
- Charles Webster
- Chris Brann (Wamdue Project)
- Daniel Bell
- Dan Curtin
- Jello
- David Alvarado
- Ellis Island Sound
- Findlay Brown
- Gemini
- Glenn Underground
- Ian O'Brien
- Jessica 6
- Joe Lewis
- John Beltran
- José González
- Kenny Larkin
- Klima
- Little Dragon
- Luke Slater
- Pulseprogramming
- Marco Passarani
- Marissa Nadler
- Mark Tinley
- Max Brennan
- Mined
- Moodymann
- Neil Landstrumm
- Norma Jean Bell
- Nouvelle Vague
- Parekh & Singh
- Paul Johnson
- Readymade FC
- Recloose
- Robert Hood
- Ron Trent
- Roy Davis Jr.
- Stasis
- Suburban Knight
- The Beauty Room
- The Detroit Escalator Co.
- The Memory Band
- Theo Parrish
- Underground Evolution

== See also ==
- List of record labels
