= Music of Switzerland =

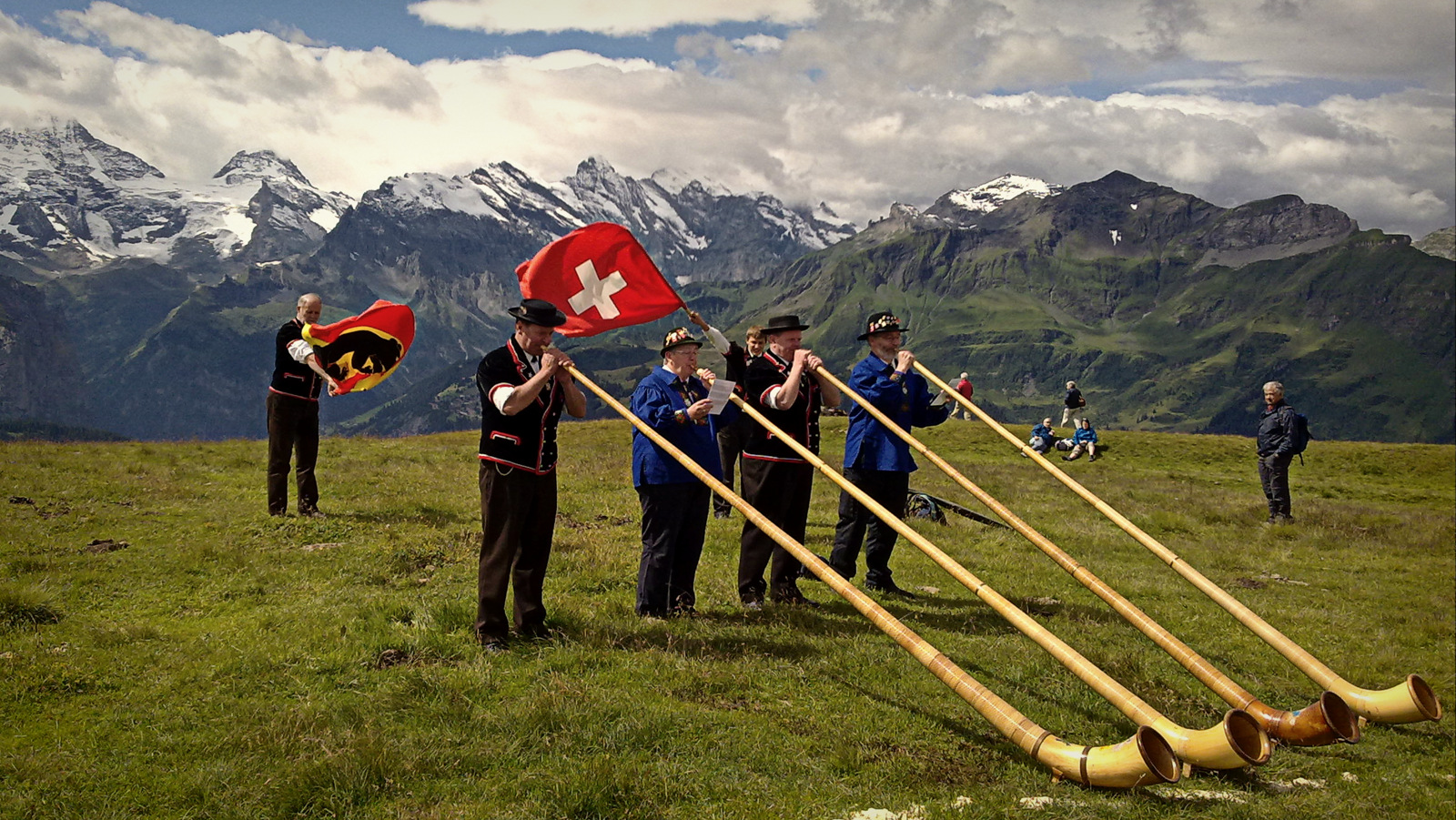
Men playing Alphorns, a traditional Swiss instrument, at Grindelwald Alphorn Festival, Switzerland

Switzerland has long had a distinct cultural identity, despite its diversity of German, French, Italian, Romansh and other ethnicities. Religious and folk music dominated the country until the 17th century, with growth in production of other kinds of music occurring slowly.

== Classical music ==
Switzerland has produced many esteemed classical composers over the centuries, such as Rennaissance composer Ludwig Senfl, Joachim Raff, Arthur Honegger (who has featured on the Swiss franc note), and Ernest Bloch.

== Folk music ==
Due to a lack of detailed records, little is known about Swiss folk music prior to the 19th century. Some 16th-century lute tablatures have been reconstructed into authentic instrumental arrangements; however, the first major source of information comes from 19th-century collections of folk songs, and work done by musicologist Hanny Christen. One of the oldest varieties of folk music was the Swiss song Kühreihen, an agricultural Alpine song in the Lydian mode. Traditional instruments included alphorn, hammered dulcimer, fife, hurdy-gurdy, castanets, rebec, bagpipe, cittern and shawm.

At the beginning of the 19th century, Swiss folk music was largely performed by ensembles made of itinerant musicians and solo acts using an instrument, with only a few duos. In the 1830s, however, the Swiss military was reorganized, leading to the formation of brass bands that used modern instruments. These instruments, mostly brass or wind, were built much better than those played by itinerants, and musicians brought them back to their villages. Local players joined these ensembles, which played dance music for festivals and other celebrations. Dance styles included schottisch, mazurka, waltz and polka.

In 1829, the accordion was invented in Vienna, and it had spread to Switzerland by 1836. The accordion was popular because it was relatively easy to play and cheap to acquire, and took only one musician to play the melody and accompaniment. By the 1850s, the accordion was an integral part of Swiss folk music, and semi-professional ensembles were appearing to play at large social dances. Alongside the brass bands came string instruments like the violin and double bass; string bands soon began to displace the older brass bands. The accordion, however, did not make an appearance in these dance bands until about 1903, and it eventually replaced the two violins which had become standard.

Following World War I, Switzerland became more heavily urbanized, and music moved to cities like Zürich. Rural folk music became the most popular style for middle-class audiences, and musicians like Joseph Stocker ("Stocker Sepp") became renowned across the country. Stocker knew his audience liked the exotic appeal of rural music, and so he bought traditional costumes from Unterwalden for his band. This was the beginning of laendlermusic, which peaked in popularity in the 1930s and 1940s.

In the urban areas of Switzerland, folk music began to mix with new styles, like jazz and the foxtrot, while the saxophone replaced the clarinet. Beginning in the 1930s, the Swiss government began to encourage a national identity distinct from Germany and other neighbors. Laendlermusic became associated with this identity and grew even more popular.

Following World War II, however, laendlermusic quickly grew less popular with the influx of imported styles. The field also grew less diverse, with more standardized band formats and only four or five dance types in the repertoire. By the 1960s, trios consisting of two accordions and a double bass were the most common format, and many Swiss people felt it was a civic duty to preserve this tradition and guard it against change. They have largely succeeded in preventing change, but the field has grown stagnant and much less popular. There are still popular performers, such as Res Schmid, Willi Valotti, Markus Flueckiger, Dani Haeusler, and Carlo Brunner, but the total fanbase has shrunk enormously.

During the late 1990s, and especially in the 2000s from around 2008 to the present, the family band Oesch's die Dritten, a yodeling family from the Bernese Oberland, have been enjoying success. Their format is a Schwyzerörgeli (small accordion) played by Hans Oesch, a guitar, an electric bass, and a large accordion. They are fronted by Melanie Oesch.

=== Folk music from Appenzell ===
The rural Appenzell region is a major center of folk music. While other parts of Switzerland adopted the accordion (Langnauerli and Schwyzerörgeli) in the 19th century, Appenzell kept the violin and hammered dulcimer. String music from Appenzell is popular throughout Switzerland. In its original arrangement (two violins, dulcimer, cello, contrabass) is of great importance, while the accordion and piano are also included in some formations.

== Pop and rock ==
=== Late 20th century ===
Later in the 20th century, in the 1960s, rock and roll, or beat music, was popular, peaking in 1968 with the release of Les Sauterelles' "Heavenly Club". Swiss rock popularity began in 1957, when the Hula Hawaiians incorporated rockabilly, setting the stage for the early 1960s boom. The Francophone section of Switzerland soon found itself dominated by French stars like Johnny Hallyday, and soon Swiss artists like Les Aiglons, Larry Greco and Les Faux-Frères became major artists.

1964 saw Beatles-inspired pop take hold on the continent, displacing the earlier instrumental rock and inspired musical battles in Basel, the capital of Swiss rock. Swiss bands in the same mold included The 16 Strings and Pichi, and German-speaking acts soon dominated the field. Zürich then became a center of innovation, drawing on Chris Lange's blues-roots explorations, Heiner Hepp's Bob Dylan-inspired folk and Toni Vescoli's pop fame. Other Swiss artists of the period included R&B act The Nightbirds from Locarno, light rock stars The Wild Gentlemen, The Blue Sounds and pop band Marco Zappa & the Teenagers. In 1967, artists like Mani Matter, Franz Hohler, Sergius Golowin, and Kurt Marti began establishing Swiss-German dialect rock, glorifying their distinct national identities. While others like Roland Zoss and Tinu Heiniger sang on in German.

By 1968, Swiss rock was dying, and artists were exploring sonic innovations. Basel's Barry Window, for example, used soul and Indian music to make rock, while The Sauterelles explored psychedelia.

Progressive music formed by the 1970s, when jazz, blues and other genres were combined with socially aware lyrics, outlandish solos and macho posturing. The first band of the progressive rock boom was supergroup Flame Dream, Krokodil, and The Shiver and Brainticket soon followed. Sinus Studio in Bern, and engineers Eric Merz and Peter McTaggart, became the center of innovation by the mid-1970s, however.

1973 saw the first commercial release of dialect rock with Rumpelstilz's "Warehuus Blues"; the band broke into the mainstream in 1976 with the release of the reggae-influenced chart-topper Füüf Narre im Charre.

Later in the decade, hard rock became popular and Toad soon established a Swiss scene with the debut single, "Stay!", setting the stage for the 1980 explosion of Krokus, the most popular rock band in Swiss music history. Also, bands like The Swiss Horns, Red Devil Band and Circus from Basel continued the music in a more experimental form and expanded the musical boundaries of Swiss punk rock. In 1976, a small group of Swiss punks began to adapt the American and British punk rock scene. Bands like Kleenex, Dieter Meier, The Nasal Boys, Troppo, Mother's Ruin, TNT, Dogbodys, and Sick, all from Zürich, as well as Glueams (Bern), Sozz (Büren), Crazy (Lucerne), and Bastards and Jack & the Rippers (Geneva) represented the Swiss punk & wave scene of the late 1970s.

Kleenex – beside the British bands The Slits and The Raincoats – was one of the first three female bands of the Punk era, published in November 1978 their first single/EP with four songs. With the mixture of art-school, glamour and punk noise they attempted the attention of John Peel and became the first Swiss Wave export hit. They reached the UK-Charts and got a contract with Rough Trade Records.

During the 1980s, Switzerland produced a number of metal bands. A Swiss band, Celtic Frost, mostly known for their progression of style and avant-garde take on extreme music started in the early 1980s as Hellhammer and soon became a leading heavy metal band in Switzerland. They together with a few other bands laid the foundation of modern metal in Switzerland. Related to Celtic Frost is the technical thrash metal trio Coroner who were roadies for Celtic Frost. The late 1980s saw black metal band Samael being formed which converted into an industrial metal band.

At the beginning of the 1980s Swiss new wave bands developed their own individual music style and some of them became internationally famous, especially Kleenex/LiliPUT and Yello in UK and the US, or Grauzone and mittageisen in Germany. Grauzone reached the Austrian and German charts with their NDW-hit "Eisbär". Mittageisen released in January 1985 the 12" automaten" with a new electro sound. The single found the way onto the legendary John Peel show on BBC Radio 1 and became an indie-disco hit. Other notable Swiss post-punk/new wave bands are Blue China, The Vyllies and The Young Gods. Formed in 1985 by vocalist Franz Treichler, the group used digital sampling to create an intense amalgamation of classical and rock music and became pioneers of industrial music. The English music-press react enthusiastically and Melody Maker made the band's first self-titled album their "The Album of the Year".

1983 saw the Ex-Trem Normal release "Warum" and "Welcome to Switzerland", which revolutionized Bernese rock by adding distinctive dialect trends. They were followed by Züri West and other bands.

In 1986, the duo Double became the first Swiss act to hit the US Top 40 charts with their song, "The Captain of Her Heart".

In 1981, the guitar instrumental group "The four Windows" with lead guitarist Wolfgang Oehry (Long tall Wolfie) won best of Swiss TV's Sprungbrett, followed by a 5 year record contract with EMI. The group recorded the LP "IDENTITY", from which EMI singled out Wolfgang's composition "Lonely Seagull". It became the summer hit of 1982 and received extensive airtime on many radio stations. The German music publication "Fachblatt" dedicated two pages to the Windows' album, praising it as the best guitar based album in years. The band played in many concert halls and open airs, once even in the Ice hockey stadion in Zürich. They also appeared in a number of TV shows.

Since the 1980s Swiss jazz has continued to form. Notable exponents of the Swiss jazz scene are saxophonist Fritz Renold or trumpeter Franco Ambrosetti. Stephan Eicher is a popular folk rock musician, rising to prominence in the mid-1980s and gaining a popular following across Europe in the 1990s.

In the 1990s, many rappers and DJs started to influence Switzerland's musical scene. Such as Black Tiger from Basel was the first one to rap in a Swiss German dialect. Sens Unik from Renens (a suburb of Lausanne) are one of the most important rap groups, merging hip hop with influences from many other styles. Even their first EP included a track in Spanish, due to MC Carlos's Spanish and Galego heritage. Electronica is also part of the Swiss musical experience, Yello's first album came out in 1979, in the 1980s, Touch El Arab scored a hit in several European countries with the song "Muhammar". Producer Pat Jabbar from Basel established his own record company Barraka el Farnatshi in the late eighties, dedicated to music from the Arabic world (especially Morocco) mixed with dance music from the west. While most musicians' works were based on contemporary Anglo-Saxon music, singer-songwriter Christine Lauterburg took up the traditional Swiss folk music and merged old domestic song with pop and electronic music elements. With her version of the classic Swiss song "S'Vreneli vom Guggisberg", she triggered intense indignation as well as praise.

One of the most popular Swiss singer and performance artists is DJ Bobo (born René Baumann).

Emerging in the early 1990s, the band Gotthard evolved to become the leading Swiss rock group and one of the most acclaimed bands in Europe. With a total of 8 studio albums, 2 compilation albums and 2 live albums (one of which unplugged), they changed their style from hard rock to adult contemporary rock. They are presently very popular in Switzerland, but also in Germany, Austria, Italy and Brazil. Singer Steve Lee was killed in a motorcycle accident on October 5, 2010. Nic Maeder joined the band and in 2012, they toured around the world with their new album Firebirth.

=== 21st century ===
Some Swiss musicians actually enjoy a worldwide reputation, with commercial success. Helvetic electronic music plays a great role (house and dance music particularly), because of some artists like DJ Antoine, Remady, Yves Larock, or Mike Candys. Some popular Swiss acts today are the Neue Deutsche Härte band Metallspürhunde, The Dandies, Paysage d'Hiver, rock band 7 Dollar Taxi with Ralph Zöllig who plays the keyboard, Man-L and the Celtic metal band Eluveitie. Thomas Gabriel Fischer recently split up Celtic Frost and formed a new group, Triptykon, playing a black/doom style similar to recent Celtic Frost material.

In 2010, Swiss mathcore band Knut released their 4th full-length album, Wonder, on Hydra Head Records.

== Bibliography ==
- M. P. Baumann, Die Älplerfeste zu Unspunnen und die Anfänge der Volksmusikforschung in der Schweiz, in: Schweizer Töne, ed. A. Gerhard, A. Landau, 2000, pp. 155–186.
- M. P. Baumann: "Volkslied" in German, French and Italian in the online Historical Dictionary of Switzerland.
- http://culture.all-about-switzerland.info/swiss-music.html
- Sorce Keller, Marcello. "La musique de l’émigration suisse et italienne aux États-Unis", in L. Aubert (ed.), Musiques migrantes, In Folio, Genève, 2005, pp. 197–210.
- Sorce Keller, Marcello. "Transplanting multiculturalism: Swiss musical traditions reconfigured in multicultural Victoria", in Joel Crotti and Kay Dreyfus (Guest Editors), Victorian Historical Journal, LXXVIII(2007), no. 2, pp. 187–205; later appeared in Bulletin - Schweizerische Gesellschaft für Musikethnologie und Gesellschaft für die Volksmusik in der Schweiz, October 2008, pp. 53–63.
- Sorce Keller, Marcello. "La Swiss-Italian Festa a Daylesford-Hepburn Springs in Australia. Osservazioni etnografiche e un po' di cronaca", Cenobio, LV(2006), pp. 329–341.
- Sorce Keller, Marcello."The Swiss-Germans in Melbourne. Some Considerations on Musical Traditions and Identity", Schweizer Jahrbuch für Musikwissenschaft, Neue Folge, XXV(2005), pp. 131–154.
- Sorce Keller, Marcello."Canton Ticino: una identità musicale?", Cenobio, LII(2003), April–June, pp. 171–184; later appeared in Bulletin - Schweizerische Gesellschaft für Musikethnologie und Gesellschaft für die Volksmusik in der Schweiz, October 2005, pp. 30–37.
- Swiss Composers' League. 40 Contemporary Swiss Composers = 40 compositores suizos contemporáneos. Amriswil: Bodensee-Verlag, 1956.
- Wagner, Christopher. "The Alpunk Phenomenon". 2000. In Broughton, Simon and Ellingham, Mark with McConnachie, James and Duane, Orla (Ed.), World Music, Vol. 1: Africa, Europe and the Middle East, pp. 7–12. Rough Guides Ltd, Penguin Books. ISBN 1-85828-636-0
