= Mital-U =

mital-U
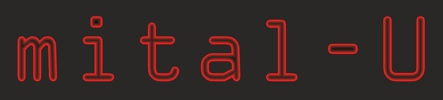
- Founded: 1996; 30 years ago
- Founder: Bruno Waser
- Distributors: CD Baby (digital), CeDe.com (physical)
- Genre: Post-punk, Dark wave, Electronic
- Country of origin: Switzerland
- Location: Lucerne
- Official website: mital-u.ch/indie-label/

mital-U (stylized in lowercase) is an independent record label based in Lucerne, Switzerland. Founded by musician and producer Bruno Waser in 1996, the label is renowned for releasing new material alongside reissues of influential works from the Swiss post-punk and dark wave scenes. The label has released works by significant artists including Grauzone, mittageisen, The Vyllies, and Crazy. mital-U is recognized within the alternative music scene for its focus on post-punk, darkwave, and industrial music. The label's importance within these genres is documented by independent sources such as the Gothic & Industrial Music Archive.

== History ==
Bruno Waser started producing records for underground Swiss bands in the early 1980s, including Crazy and mittageisen. In 1996, he formally established mital-U, among the first European indie labels to adopt web-based music distribution. The label became best known for digitally restoring and remastering key releases from the 1980s, including complete anthologies by Grauzone, mittageisen, and The Vyllies. As part of the reissue of these compilations, the original music videos for 'automaten' by mittageisen and 'Whispers in the Shadow' by The Vyllies have been restored and remastered. mital-U also produced the first official video for 'Eisbär' by Grauzone. Besides creating music videos, mital-U (Bruno W) has taken on the role of executive producer for music documentaries such as Poly Styrene: I Am a Cliché and WIRE – People in a Film.

== Collaborations ==
mital-U has formed collaborations with several independent labels and organisations:

- CSR Records – for co-producing the *Swiss Kult-Hits* compilations.
- Off Course Records – for licensing and digitising the Grauzone back catalogue.
- Creep Records – collaborated on the reissue of The Vyllies’ early recordings as part of the complete back catalogue.
- EarthPercent – since March 2023, mital-U has supported EarthPercent's activities as a brand partner and participated in the EarthPercent 2023 and 2025 campaigns.

== Notable Artists and Releases ==
- Grauzone: NDW pioneers best known for the song Eisbär (1980). mital-U have restored and reissued their complete recordings, including the first-time release of 'Polar Bear' with English lyrics.
- mittageisen: The band released one of the first German-language dark wave album in March 1983, followed by the 12* single automaten in January 1985. Both vinyls were selected as ‘Record of the week’ on the Swiss radio show ‘Sounds!’ and the song ‘automaten’ was played by John Peel.
- The Vyllies: This all-female gothic band from Switzerland was active from 1983 to 1988. Their back catalogue was remastered and released by mital-U.
- Crazy: One of the first Swiss punk band. Their first independent SwissPunk LP *No Chance* was produced and released in 1980 by mital-U (Bruno W).

== Cultural Impact ==
mital-U's productions have featured in museum exhibitions, including Oh Yeah! Pop Music in Switzerland at the Museum of Communication Bern (2014–2015). *Eisbär* and *automaten* were two of the Top 20 songs listed in the 'CH Hall of Fame 80s'. The label's reissues have received positive reviews in scene media such as Artnoir, OX-Fanzine, BLACK Magazine, and Dangerous Minds. mittageisen’s work clearly inspired designer Julia Seemann’s capsule collection, which she presented at London Fashion Week in 2016.

== See also ==
- Grauzone
- Mittageisen (band)
- Post-punk
- Dark wave
- Independent record labels
