= Masked Marvel =

Masked Marvel may refer to:

- Masked Marvel (Centaur Publications), a superhero originally published by Centaur Publications
- Masked Marvel (Marvel Comics), an alternate name of Speedball, a superhero from Marvel Comics
- Masked Marvel (horse), a thoroughbred racehorse who won the 2011 St. Leger Stakes
- The Masked Marvel, a 1940s Republic Pictures serial
- Charley Patton, an American Delta Blues musician who recorded and performed under that name in the 1920s
- John Bonica, a Sicilian American anesthesiologist and professional wrestler
- Cyclone Mackey, the first wrestler to work masked in Mexico
- Luc Poirier, a professional wrestler who performed under that name in the early 1980s
