= Automaten =

"automaten"

Single by mittageisen
- A-side: "automaten"
- B-side: "neues china"
- Released: January 14, 1985 / April 16, 2016
- Recorded: 1984, Cologne
- Length: 12-inch: 6:25, 7-Inch: 4:23
- Label: LUNA-MB-MUSIK (mital-U)
- Producer: Bruno W

automaten (German for robots) is a 1985 "cult" song composed by the Swiss band mittageisen.

== Background and writing ==
The 12-inch single (LUNA-MB 8501) was released on 14 January 1985 with a for that time new electro sound. The songs were recorded in a studio in Switzerland in the autumn of 1984. but, as Bruno W said in an interview, the band wasn't satisfied with the first studio-version of "automaten" and he travelled to Cologne to mix the final-version in collaboration with Detlev Kühne (Die Hornissen) and Tom Dokoupil (The Wirtschaftswunder) at their on line studios.

Just after the publication was "automaten" selected for Record of the Week by the radio show "Sounds!" of the Swiss Radio DRS3.

The 12-inch single found also the way into the legendary John Peel show on BBC Radio 1 and became an 'indie disco' hit. Because of the success of the 12-inch version a 2 minutes shorter 7-inch version was released four months later, so the song could be played not only on specialised alternative radio-shows.

The two, in relation to the length, different versions are still available on the 2008 released double CD mittageisen 1983–1986 remastered.

For Record Store Day on 16 April 2016 the label mital-U re-released the maxi-single "automaten" as limited and numbered 12" vinyl record (U-7C0-V1).

2014 "automaten" was one of the Top 20 songs of the 'CH Hall of Fame 80s' presented at the exhibition 'OH YEAH! - Pop music in Switzerland' at the Museum of Communication in Bern.

On 20th April 2023, a new version edited by Bruno W (mev2) was released exclusively for download on Bandcamp under the title "mev2 feat mittageisen - automaten (-6y edit)". Proceeds from the download will be donated to EarthPercent an environmental charity co-founded by Brian Eno. This as part of the 'EarthPercent x Earth Day 2023' campaign in which over 60 artists have provided previously unreleased, unheard or exclusive songs.

== Content ==
The for mittageisen typical ambiguous text is explained by the chorus line "work – only for robots". What are meant, according to author Bruno W, with "robots" are not primarily machines, but also robot-like functioning people.

== Music video ==
The music video for "automaten" was produced in 1995 in relation to the release of a compilation CD with songs of mittageisen. The 4-minute long video shows color distorted scenes from the everyday life of working people such as way to work, car rides, telecasts, up to exploding TVs. With the re-release of the 12" in 2016, a remastered and new edited version of the video was published.

== Track listing ==
12-inch (LUNA-MB 8501)

1. "automaten" – 6:25
2. "neues china" – 5:50

7-inch (LUNA-MB 8505)

1. "automaten" – 4:23
2. "neues china" – 5:50

12-inch (U-7C0-V1)

1. "automaten" – 6:23
2. "neues china" – 5:48
3. "automaten (radio edit)" – 3:19

== Personnel ==
- Bruno W – Vocals, Synthesizer, Drum machine, Sound engineer
- Daniel S – Guitar
- Manuela H – Synthesizer

=== Additional personnel ===
- Tom Dokoupil (The Wirtschaftswunder) – Sound engineer
- Detlev Kühne (Die Hornissen) – Sound engineer
