= Corin Curschellas =

Swiss musician and actress

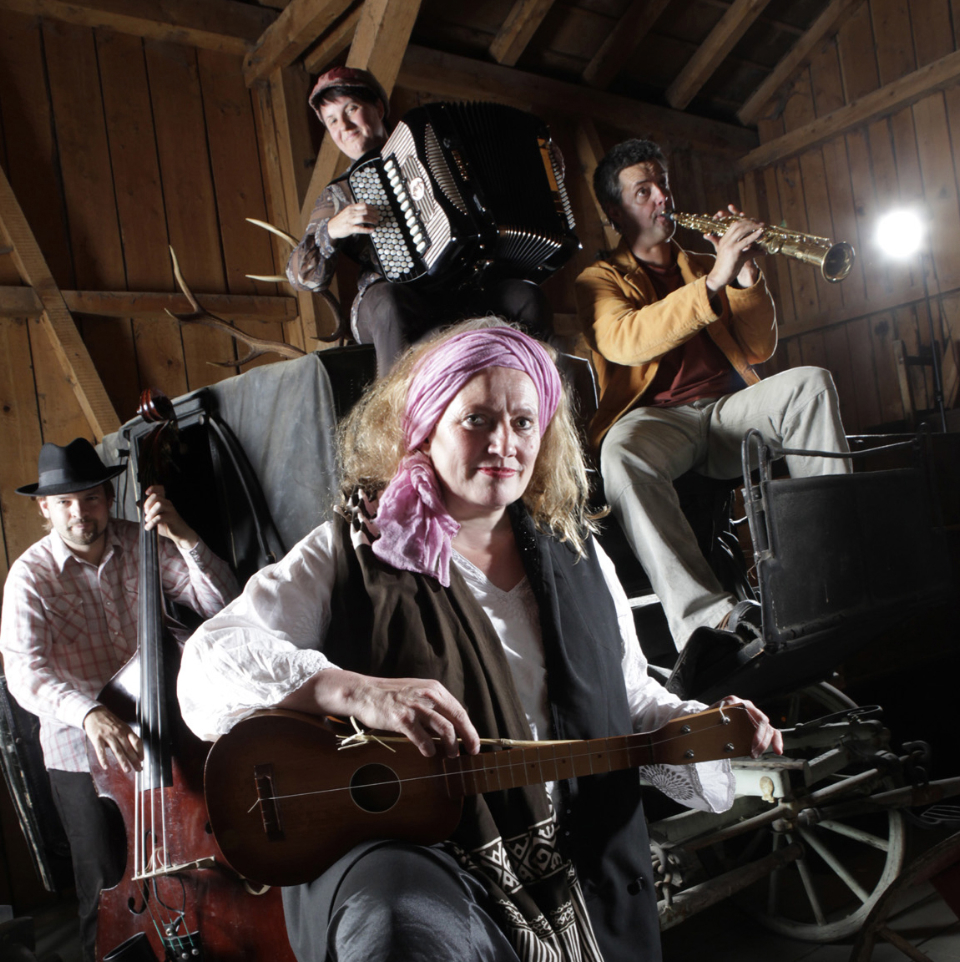
Corin Curschellas together with Albin Brun, Patricia Draeger and Claudio Strebel Spring 2012 («La Grischa»).

Corin Curschellas (Romansh pronunciation: [ˈkɔrin kurˈʃeːlɐs]; born 2 July 1956) is a Swiss singer-songwriter, vocalist (jazz, folk music, world music, chanson), free improvisation, actress (theatre, film, musical), voice actress in (radio drama and audio books) as well as voice instructress.

== Biography ==
Curschellas was born in 1956 in Chur (Graubünden, Switzerland where she grew up. She attended the local state school in Chur, Kantonsschule Chur, and completed her studies in 1977 with a Primary Teacher's Certificate.

From 1977 to 1983 she studied theatre and theatre pedagogy at the Zurich University of the Arts as well as three semesters of Music Sciences at the University of Zurich.

From 1983 until 1989 Curschellas lived in Berlin, followed by two years in Basel. A grant she received enabled her to move to Paris in 1991, where she ended up living until 2000, with a two-year break she spent in New York City from 1995 to 1997. Between 2000 and 2005 she alternated between Paris and Zürich.

I have always lived in worlds foreign to me, but the poems and songs enabled me to connect with my home […] I certainly was homesick. In Berlin I read copious volumes on the Romansh culture. Before that it had hardly interested me, but there I really wanted to get to know it. I met so many people who spoke of their origins that I wanted to find or establish my identity

— Corin Curschellas in a broadcast for Radiotelevisiun Svizra Rumantscha, 19 May 2013.

The song "Senza patria", "Homeless" in English, stems from this rather eventful period in her life.

Since 2005 the artist has lived in Zürich and in the Surselvan Rueun about 30 kilometers outside of Chur. In Rueun she lives together with her life partner, the sculptor Linard Nicolay, in the house that belonged to her grandparents and where she used to spend her childhood holidays.

Corin Curschellas' actual mother tongue is the Swiss German dialect. Although from her father she learnt to speak near-perfect Surselvan, she does not herself write any Graubünden Romansh songs. However, she does sing the lyrics and songs of Romansh writers in full Romansh Idiom, including Graubünden Rumansh.

Speaking of her increased connection to her Romansh roots and her return to Rueun, Corin Curschellas says:

Jeu sundel en ina fasa dalla veta nua ch’igl ei sco sche mellis dutgs vegnessen ensemen per sbuccar ella mar. Ei vegn tut pli ruasseivel, ferm e curaschus, pli clar e concentrau.

— Translation: I am at a phase in my life where a thousand streams flow together to pour out into the sea. Everything is more peaceful, more secure and courageous; clearer and more concentrated.
Corin Curschellas on 3 Mai 2012 in an interview with La Quotidiana

== Work ==
=== Song ===
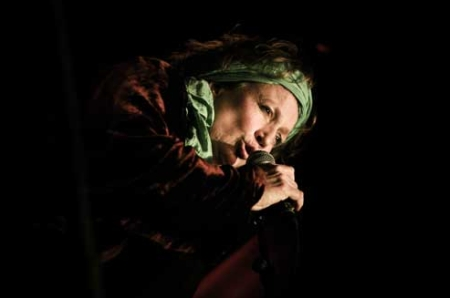
Corin Curschellas in concert with the group «eCHo».

Corin Curschellas music covers different Music genres: Jazz, Folk, Chanson, World Music, Folk Song, Musical improvisation. She refers to herself ironically as a "sound medium"(Tonträgerin).

Corin Curschellas mostly sings in the Romansh Language, Swiss German and English, though also in Standard German, French or Italian, and even in Gibberish.

From 1977 to 1983 Corin Curschellas worked together with Walter Lietha, where they produced albums like "Die Fahrenda" (The Travellers) or "Liebi Schwiizer guet Nacht" (Goodnight, dear Swiss).

From 1993 to 1997, Corin Curschellas was lead singer for the "Vienna Art Orchestra". She toured with this Orchestra once again in 2009.

Thereafter Corin Curschellas worked on productions with Peter Scherer, a noted musician, producer and composer for film and dance, Noël Akchoté, David Byrne, Andreas Vollenweider, Max Lässer (Überlandorchester), Fritz Hauser, Heiri Känzig, Christian Marclay, Hélène Labarrière and Yves Robert. With Steve Argüelles, Christophe Minck and Benoît Delbecq she was for certain periods a full member of their Jazz and Improvisation band The Recyclers.

She brought out eight albums containing her own songs and realized numerous personal musical projects. A selection of these follows in chronological order.

- With the Musiciens du Nil, Christy Doran und Fritz Hauser she toured Egypt and Tunisia in 1999.
- With guitarist Nguyên Lê, bass player Richard Bona and Drummer Steve Argüelles she worked between 1991 and 1995 on a Jimi Hendrix Project entitled «Are You Experienced?» at numerous festivals throughout Europe, North Africa und La Réunion.
- 1992 while in Paris, Corin Curschellas wrote the song La pura (English "The Farming Woman"), based on the poem of that name by the Swiss priest/poet Gion Cadieli. She combines the language of the traditional theme and alpine text with foreign, Moroccan tones. At the time, the song figured in the program "Hot Rotation" of the Swiss national television station DRS 3.
- Her first large World music project Sud des Alpes originated in 2000: in this collaboration with the Senegalese Douane Saliou Sène and Abdou Samb Corin Curschellas combines Swiss folk music tradition with the sounds and rhythms of Senegal and even with the Senegalese language Wolof. The song La pura finds new expression within this project.
- Also in 2000 the World Music project Global Vocal Meeting with Corin Curschellas, Abdoulaye Diabate (Mali), Rinde Eckert (United States), Mónika «Mitsou» Juhász Miczura (Hungary), Sudha Ragunathan (India) and Senge (Madagascar), came about during the "Stimmen-Festival", the Voice Festival of Lörrach. It premiered in Lörrach and was followed by a tour through Europe and the United States.
- From 2001 onwards, together with Christine Lauterburg and Walter Lietha, she sings Swiss German folk song arrangements in the bands, Echo und Doppelbock.
- In 2004 she performed together with the Jazz pianist Vera Kappeler at the Schauspielhaus Zürich (Zürich state theater) in the "Pfauen-Matinée" of Werner Wollenberger, and with Wolfgang Mitterer and Peter Herbert she toured Austria under the name "Wir 4 " (English: "The Four of Us") in 2005.
- With the Turkish-German singer Özay Fecht she founded a global New Year's song project in 2005.
- In her Album Grischunit of 2008 she sings in Romansh and is accompanied by Marc Ribot, Peter Scherer, Shahzad Ismaily and Matt Johnson. Intriguingly, the recording took place in New York City, far from rural Romansh-speaking areas of Switzerland. Die lyrics are by Linard Bardill, Benedetto Vigne, Ann Dee, Thomas Cathomen, Arno Camenisch and Corin Curschellas herself. The Album's name refers to a rare mineral, Grishunite belonging to the Wicksites, which occurs only in the Swiss canton of Graubünden.
- In the Album La Grischa, 2012 Corin Curschellas, together with Albin Brun, Patricia Draeger and Claudio Strebel presents a collection of old Romansh folk songs, with an outlandish assortment of instruments: Schwyzerörgeli/Accordion, Duduk, Soprano saxophone, Toy piano, Waterphone and Double bass.
- The Album Origins (trad.) of 2014 also brings old Romansh traditional songs back to public awareness. It is a co-production between the violinist Andi Gabriel and the folk musicians of the group "Pflanzplätz". Ursina Giger and Astrid Alexandre appear as guest artists.
- On 14 August 2015, a performance together with the Ladin Dolomitan Trio Ganes, as well as Patricia Draeger and Barbara Gisler premiered at the Alpentöne-Festival in Altdorf.

=== Instrumental Music ===
Corin Curschellas is a Multi-instrumentalist: She plays Piano, Keyboards, Indian Harmonium, Dulcimers and Zithers, Percussion and Ukulele besides the Accordion.

=== Musical Ethnography ===
A good part of Corin Curschellas’ musical work has an ethnographic aspect. She collects excerpts of Romansh cultural heritage – in the case of "Origins (trad)" she used the archive "Alfons Maissen" from the 1930s. She makes these texts known through her albums and concerts and the songbook "La Grischa" that she is working on. The book "La Grischa" contains, besides the lyrics and harmonies to the songs in the albums "La Grischa" and Origins (trad.)", much ethnographical musical information by Iso Albin. This ethnographical engagement has caused her to become known as the "Grande Dame of contemporary and traditional Romansh Song" . At the same time Corin Curschellas distances herself from Pop-style Alpine Folklore.

The concert project “Suisse Miniature” forms part of the same theme. The project was born out of one of the “Convivenza-Events” of Lia Rumantscha in the year 2010. By 2013, a collection of songs in the three original languages of Graubünden, Walser German, Italian and Romansh had come about. The name of the project refers to the Open Air Theatre "Suisse Miniature" in Melide, Ticino on the one hand and on the other the fact that the Canton Graubünden represents both culturally and linguistically a kind of Switzerland in miniature.

With La Pura in 1992 her first concern with ethnographic issues lies quite far back in the past. However, Corin Curschellas sees in it a biographical connection.

Je älter ich werde, desto grösser wird die Affinität zu alten Liedern.

— Corin Curschellas in der Aargauer Zeitung vom 1. Mai 2012.

(English: the older I become, the greater the affinity for the traditional songs.)

=== Solo Programs ===
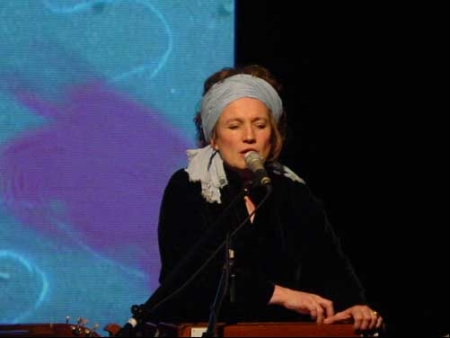
Corin Curschellas in her solo program «Mono» 2005: song, music, film plane.

Corin Curschellas started to do solo performances in 2005:

- 2005: endlICH («Sola!») (English (approx.): I at last)
- 2005: Mono («Sechs Instrumente, sechs Sprachen und eine Filmebene») (English: Six Instruments, six languages and a film plane")
- 2010: Pomp auf Pump («Ein dramatisch-musikalischer Abgesang»)(English: "Pump the Pomp" a musical-dramatic aftersong)
- 2011: Wittern und twittern («Gesänge aus einem humanoiden Bestiarium»)(English: "Sniffing and Chirping" ("Songs from a humanoid menagerie") )

From the program Mono comes Corin Curschellas’ musical rendition of the Canzun de Sontga Margriata (English: Song of Saint Margaret), one of the oldest Romansh texts in existence. The song tells how St. Margaret, who has dressed up as an alpine dairyman, works on the Alp, but by accident her disguise is unexpectedly revealed. Corin Curschellas interprets the song in the context of nature conservation and sustainability.

The Goddess of Fertility, Margriata, for me represents the Symbol for Nature itself […] and the respectful, conscious manner we have to deal with her gifts. If we betray this original knowledge, the slopes erode and begin to slide, the sources dry up, our bees die, the eternal ice in the Alps melts, as do the polar icecaps. Fish end up in polluted rivers, our oceans look like oil spills, the high seas are soon devoid of fish, and instead, carpets of plastic waste float about for miles around.

— Corin Curschellas in her speech on the Swiss National Day on 1 August 2013 in Baden, Switzerland.

=== Composition ===
Corin Curschellas produced her first substantial composition in 1979/1980 while she was still studying. It was a theatrical composition for the play Woman by Edward Bond at the National Theatre in Zürich – Schauspielhaus Zürich, directed by George Gruntz.

In 2003 Corin Curschellas composed the music for the TV drama, Marilyn by Stina Werenfels together with Christian Rösli

In 2014 she worked on the cultural-political project "Uccelin – eine Singvogel Suite" (Uccelin – a Songbird Suite). Die Suite pays Hommage to and supports the art project «Uccellin» (English Little Bird) of the Chur artist Hans Danuser. The content deals with children's Counting-out games and the political theme is the influence of politics on art.

Besides this, Corin Curschellas composes songs for Michael von der Heide (for example the award-winning Jeudi amour, 1998), and previously for Vera Kaa und Dodo Hug.

=== Theatre ===
Corin Curschellas has acted, amongst others, in the following productions:

- 1983 Nur Stammtische werden überleben (English (approximate) "Only meetings at the local pub will survive." (Director Christoph Marthaler)
- 1986 Das Damenorchester (The Women's Orchestra) by Jean Anouilh (Berliner Festspiele)
- 1987 – 1989 The Forest (Direction: Robert Wilson, Volksbühne Berlin and BAM Brooklyn Academy of Music in New York)
- 1989 Soldaten, Serviertöchter und ihre Lieder (Soldiers, Waitresses and their Songs) (Theater Basel, Director Christoph Marthaler)
- 1990 Allerlei Rausch (All Manner of Intoxication) at the Theater Marie in Aarau, Freie Theatergruppe M.A.R.I.A, Director: Wolfram Berger)
- 1992 Stägeli uuf, Stägeli ab (Upstairs and Downstairs) (Theater Basel, Director Christoph Marthaler)
- 1998/1999 Do Chinese Postmen ring twice too? (Director: Hans Peter Litscher, Music: Christian Marclay, Wiener Festspiele und Knitting Factory NYC)
- 2000 Hotel Angst (Hotel of Fear) (Schauspielhaus Zürich, Director Christoph Marthaler)
- 2003 Der Messias (Schauspielhaus Zürich, Director: Nicola Weisse)
- 2003 Die schöne Müllerin (The Beautiful Miller's Daughter) (Wiener Festpiele/Schauspielhaus Zürich, Director Christoph Marthaler)
- 2003 Das goldene Zeitalter (The Golden Age) (Schauspielhaus Zürich, Direction: Christoph Marthaler, Stefan Pucher, Meg Stuart)
- 2004 Tschechows drei entfernte Cousinen (Chekhov's Three Distant Cousins) at the Theater am Neumarkt in Zürich.

In 2006 und 2007 Corin Curschellas played the part of Frau Rossi in the Musical Die schwarzen Brüder (The Black Brothers) 2008 she acted in the Musical Elternabend (Parent's Evening) at the Theater am Hechtplatz.

=== Radio Plays ===
In 2008 Corin Curschellas played in the series Jimmy Flitz by Roland Zoss, where she spoke the part of Tigerfliege (Tigerfly) and sang. In 2009 she performed as speaker and singer in Fritz Hauser's radio play Am Rande des Horizonts (On the Edge of the Horizon). In 2012 she played in the radio play Ustrinkata of Arno Camenisch SRF 1 in a role as speaker.

=== Film ===
In 2007 Corin Curschellas acted in the Film Marmorera.

=== Education ===
During her days in Berlin, Corin Curschellas taught at the Musikschule Kreuzberg. She has, from time to time, worked as guest lecturer at the Zurich University of the Arts and at the Lucerne University of Applied Sciences and Arts.

== Awards and honors ==
- 1991: «Atelier Paris» der GSMBA (today visarte), Bursary of the Canton Graubünden
- 1993: Prize of the Canton Graubünden
- 1998: Contest for professional cultural work Canton Graubünden
- 1999: Composition commission of the Pro Helvetia Trust
- 2003: Contest for professional cultural work of the Canton Graubünden
- 2003: «Prix Eliette» of Eliette von Karajan
- 2005: Musical Award of the «Fondation Suisa», a foundation of the SUISA
- 2005: Award from the city of Chur
- 2010: Award of the organization for cultural promotion of the Canton Graubünden
- 2014: Nominated for the Swiss Music Award 2014 of the Bundesamt für Kultur (Federal Department for Culture)
- 2018: Canton Grisons Culture Prize 2018 awarded by the Government of the Canton Graubünden, Switzerland

== Discography ==
Corin Curschellas has produced eight personal albums since:

- 1992 Music Loves Me, with Steve Argüelles (Producer), Max Lässer, Django Bates, Pat Bettison, Mike Mondesir, Steve Watts, Christy Doran, Tony Coe, Roland van Straaten, Alban Früh, Uli Scherer, Fritz Hauser, Hans Kennel
- 1995 Rappa Nomada, with Django Bates, Peter Scherer, Steve Argüelles (Producer), Cyro Baptista, Lionel D, Ashley Slater, Lucky Ranku, Mike Mondesir, Max Lässer, Benoit Delbecq, Noël Akchoté, Alex Balanescu Quartet and others. Lyrics: Corin Curschellas, Hugo von Hoffmansthal, Gian Fontana, James Fenton, Linard Bardill, Carli Fry.
- 1997 Valdun – Voices of Rumantsch, with Noël Akchoté, Steve Argüelles, Damon Banks, Cyro Baptista, Greg Cohen, Benoît Delbecq, Peter Herbert, Yuri Lemeshev, Graham Haynes, J.T. Lewis, Christian Marclay, Ikue Mori, Marc Ribot, Fernando Saunders, Robert Quine, Peter Scherer (Producer).
- 1999 Goodbye Gary Cooper, with Steve Argüelles (Producer), Noël Akchoté, Richard Bona, Margot Châtelain, Benoît Delbecq, Ann Dee, Christophe Minck, Min Xiao Fen, Olivier Glissant, Franz Hackl, Michael von der Heide, Peter Herbert, U Shu Hua, Olivier Ker Ourio and others.
- 2002 Sud des Alpes, with Christian Rösli, Dominik Rüegg, Douane Saliou Sène, Abdou Samb, Andy Pupato, Steve Argüelles (Procducer)
- 2008 Grischunit, with Marc Ribot, Peter Scherer (Producer), Shahzad Ismaily, Matt Johnson
- 2012 La Grischa, with Albin Brun, Patricia Draeger and Claudio Strebel (Communal production)
- 2013 Origins, with Thomas Aeschbacher, Jürg Nietlispach and Simon Dettwiler of Pflanzplätz and Andy Gabriel of the Helvetic Fiddlers (communal production)
- 2015 La Triada, with Astrid Alexandre and Ursina Giger
- 2016 La Nova, with Markus Flückiger, Vera Kappeler, Anna Trauffer and Pez Zumthor

=== Collaboration ===
Corin Curschellas worked on productions together with the following artists:

- Walter Lietha: 1977 – 2007
- Max Lässer: 1977 – 2009
- Andreas Vollenweider: 1983 – 1992
- John Wolf Brennan: 1985
- Hardy Hepp: 1988 – 1994
- David Byrne: 1991
- Roland Van Straaten: 1991
- Creative Works Orchestra: 1991 – 1993
- Linard Bardill: 1993 – 2005
- Vienna Art Orchestra: 1993 – 2009
- Machination: 1994
- Yves Robert: 1994
- Heiri Känzig: 1994
- Andi Scherer (Band «Yal»): 1998
- Christian Marclay: 1996 – 1999
- Alex Kirschner: 2000
- Pareglish: 2000
- Fritz Hauser: 1981 – 2009
- «eCHo»: 2001 – 2007
- Nguyên Lê: 2002
- Gardi Hutter: 2003
- Curdin Janett (Project Standards of Rumantsch): 2005
