= Filicudi =

Island in Italy

Native name: Phynicùsa (Greek)
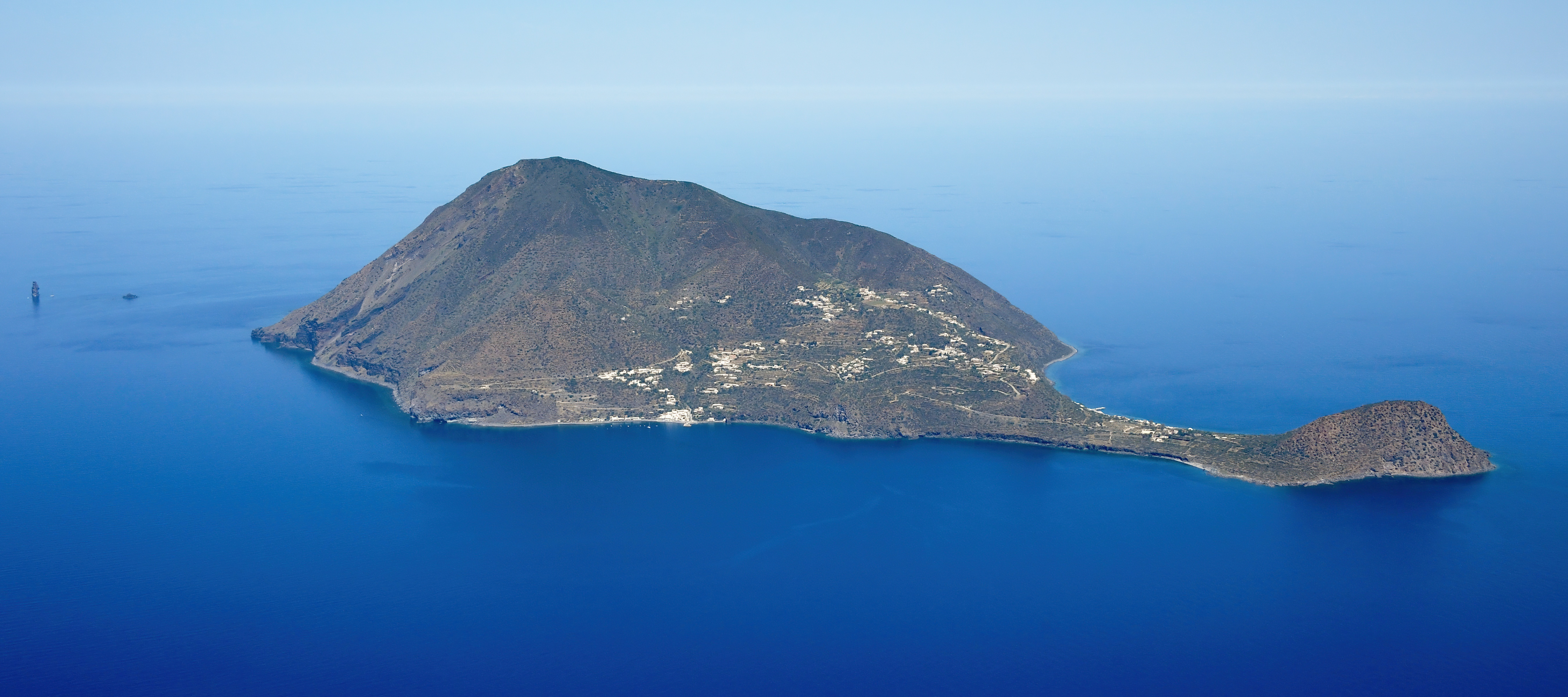
- Aerial view of Filicudi from the south

- Location within Sicily

Geography
- Location: Tyrrhenian Sea
- Coordinates: 38°34′17″N 14°33′45″E
- Archipelago: Aeolian Islands
- Area: 9.49 km^{2} (3.66 sq mi)
- Highest elevation: 774 m (2539 ft)
- Highest point: Fossa Felci

Administration
- Italy
- Region: Sicily
- Province: Messina
- Comune: Lipari

Demographics
- Demonym: Filicudari
- Population: 235 (2001)
- Pop. density: 25/km^{2} (65/sq mi)

Additional information
- Official website: comunelipari.gov.it

Filicudi (Italian pronunciation: [filiˈkuːdi]) is one of seven islands that make up the Aeolian archipelago, situated 46 km (29 mi) northeast of the island of Sicily, Southern Italy. It is a frazione of the comune of Lipari.

== Geography ==
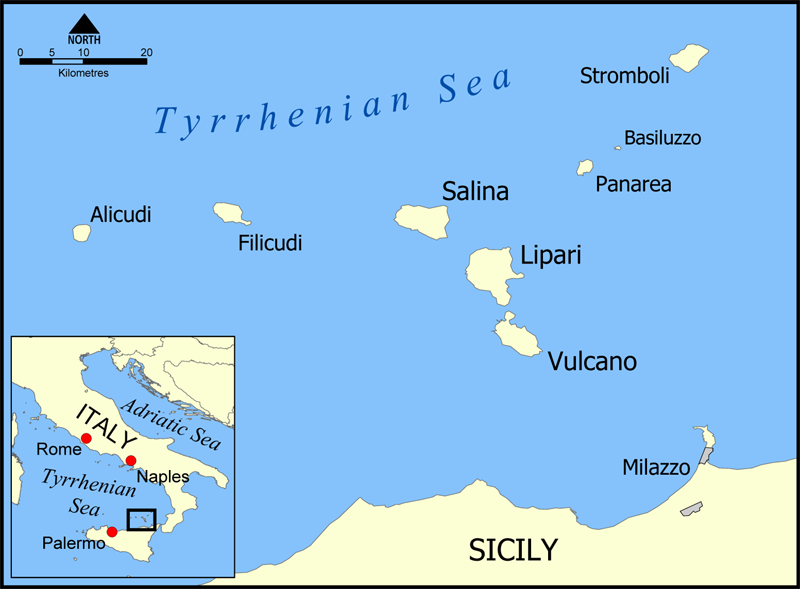
The Aeolian Islands.

Its total area is 9.5 km^{2} (3.7 sq mi). There are several small villages on the island, which include Pecorini Mare and Valdichiesa. Filicudi's lands are capable of producing wine, olive oil, grain, and vegetables. In 1997, three-quarters, approximately 7 km^{2} (2.7 sq mi) of Filicudi was turned into a Natural Reserve.

The highest point is Monte Fossa Felci at 774 m (2,539 ft). Other points include Monte Montagnola at 349 m (1,145 ft) and Monte Terrione at 278 m (912 ft). At Capo Graziano are the remains of a Bronze Age village dating back to the second millennium BCE. Off the coast, the volcanic finger-like rock of La Canna rises about 74 metres (243 ft) above the sea.

== History ==
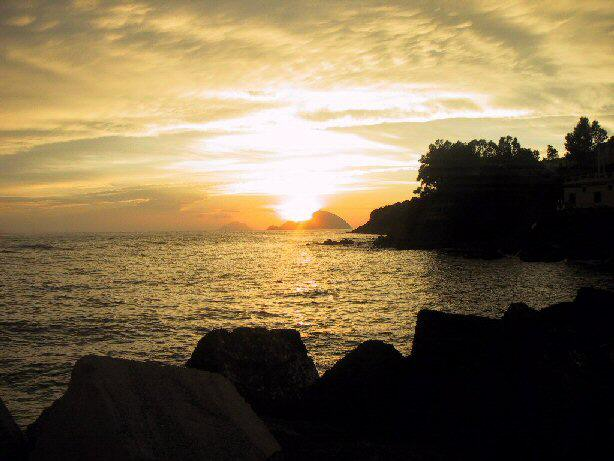
View of Alicudi and Filicudi

The modern name of "Filicudi" is a corruption of the ancient Greek name for the island, Phoenicusa (Phoenician island). The island, like the other Aeolian Islands, was settled since the Neolithic Age, around 3000 BCE. As evidenced by archaeological findings, the island was occupied by a new people during the Bronze Age. The island was uninhabited for many centuries until occupied by the Greeks. Roman and Byzantine remains can also be found on the island.

By 1971, the island had 270 residents. Roughly one-third of them left, however, after 26 May of that year, when Italian police used Filicudi as a place of exile for 18 reputed leaders of the Italian Mafia who were awaiting trial for on charges of organized crime. By 31 May, the remaining residents left in protest, with the exception of the exiles and the police guarding them.

Since the 1970s Filicudi was rediscovered and populated by photographers and artists such as Sergio Libiszewsky, Ettore Sottsass, novelist Roland Zoss, and editor Giulio Einaudi. Their perceptions brought the island into the focus of modern tourism.

== People ==
- John Bonica (born 1917), anesthesiologist and professional wrestler
- Roland Zoss (born 1951), novelist and composer

== See also ==
- List of volcanoes in Italy
- List of islands of Italy
