= Engelberg (album) =

Stephan Eicher

Studio album by Stephan Eicher
- Released: June 1991
- Recorded: Kursaal/Casino Engelberg, Switzerland
- Genre: Pop rock, chanson
- Label: Mercury
- Producer: Stephan Eicher, Dominique Blanc-Francard

Stephan Eicher chronology
My Place (1989)	Stephan Eicher (1991)	Carcassonne (1993)

Singles from Engelberg
- 1. "Déjeuner en paix" Released: 1991; 2. "Pas d'ami (comme toi)" Released: 1991; 3. "Hemmige" Released: 1992; 4. "Tu ne me dois rien" Released: 1992

Engelberg is the ninth album recorded by Swiss singer Stephan Eicher, released in 1991. It contains songs in French, English and German languages. In France, it provided four successful singles : "Déjeuner en paix" (#2), "Pas d'ami (comme toi)" (#7), "Hemmige" (#27) and "Tu ne me dois rien" (#25). It remains to date the singer's largest commercial success.

== Chart performances ==
In Switzerland, the album started at number four on 23 June 1991, and climbed at number one for five consecutive weeks in August 1991. It totaled 46 weeks on the chart (top 40), 23 of them in the top ten, and earned a double platinum disc.

In France, the album debuted at #37 on 19 July 1991 on the SNEP Albums Chart and had a peak at number two for six weeks, almost three months after its release. It totaled 21 weeks in the top ten and 74 weeks in the top 50. The album eventually achieved 2 x Platinum status.

== Track listing ==
1. "Wake Up" (Eicher) – 5:52
2. "Pas d'ami (comme toi)" (Philippe Djian, Eicher) – 3:37
3. "Move Closer" (Eicher) – 3:14
4. "Déjeuner en paix" (Djian, Eicher) – 3:55
5. "Easy" (Eicher) – 3:45
6. "Hemmige" (Mani Matter) – 3:24
7. "Wicked Ways" (Klaudia Schifferle, Eicher) – 5:16
8. "I'm So Lonesome I Could Cry" (Hank Williams) – 2:52
9. "Es Ist Alles" (Eicher, Schifferle) – 5:17
10. "Tu ne me dois rien" (Djian, Eicher) – 3:54
11. "Come on Home" (Eicher) – 3:46
12. "Djian's Waltz" (Djian, Eicher) – 2:52

== Personnel ==
- Stephan Eicher – vocals, guitar, piano, slide guitar
- Dominique Blanc-Franchard – 12-string guitar
- Steve Bolton – guitar
- Simon Clark – piano, Hammond organ, synthesizer
- Manu Katche – drums
- Pino Palladino – bass
- Max Lässer – guitar, mandolin
- Arnaud Méthivier – accordion
- Daniel Affolter – background vocals
- Beckie Bell – background vocals
- Philippe Djiian – background vocals
- Yvone Jones – background vocals
- Véronique Rivière – background vocals
- Thierry Lecompte – background vocals
- Biat Marthaler – viola
- Regina Jauslin – cello
- Florence Charlin – violin
- Julian Fels – violin
- Johanna Kern – violin
- Mathieu Monneret – cello
- Stéphane Rapetti – viola
- Isabelle Reynaud – violin
- Rudolf Sutter – violin
- Thomas Walpen – viola
- Christa Zahner – violin
- Roland Schildknecht - dulcimer

== Production notes ==
- Dominique Blanc-Franchard – producer, engineer, mixing
- Martin Hess – executive producer
- Sophie Masson – engineer, mixing
- Thierry Lecompte – assistant engineer
- Jim Rakete – cover photo
- Claudine Doury – cover photo
- Eric Clermontet – production coordination
- Joseph Baldasarre – vocal producer (English lyrics)

== Charts and sales ==
Chart (1991–1992)	Peak position
French SNEP Albums Chart	2
Swiss Albums Chart	1

Year-end chart (1991)	Position
Swiss Albums Chart	6
Year-end chart (1992)	Position
Swiss Albums Chart	20

Country	Certification	Date	Sales certified
France	2 x Platinum	1992	600,000
Switzerland	2 x Platinum	1992	100,000
