= Déjeuner en paix =

1991 single by Stephan Eicher

Single by Stephan Eicher

from the album Engelberg
- B-side: "Baudelaire Waltz"
- Released: 1991
- Recorded: 1991
- Studio: Kursaal Casino Engelberg, Switzerland
- Genre: Pop rock, chanson
- Length: 3:37
- Label: Barclay
- Songwriters: Philippe Djian, Stephan Eicher
- Producers: Stephan Eicher, Dominique Blanc-Francard

Stephan Eicher singles chronology
"Rien à voir" (1990)	"Déjeuner en paix" (1991)	"Pas d'ami (comme toi)" (1991)

"Déjeuner en paix" is a 1991 pop rock song recorded by Swiss singer Stephan Eicher. Written by Philippe Djian and composed by Eicher, it was released in the middle of 1991 as the lead single from his sixth studio album Engelberg, on which it appears as the fourth track. It became a hit in France and Belgium (Wallonia) and became Eicher's most successful single on the charts.

== Background and writing ==
"Déjeuner en paix" was written by Philippe Djian who submitted the lyrics to Eicher, and the latter decided to put them in a melody from an erratic sample on the synthesizer. Unaccustomed to the success, Eicher admitted that he lost the sense of reality for a time. Released during the Gulf War (1990–1991), the song deals with a couple who wants to have breakfast without listening the bad news from the radio. According to Elia Habib, an expert of the French charts, the text "follows the random and sometimes incoherent thread of a spontaneous story where times collide; the style oscillates between direct and reported dialogues, narration and thoughts".

== Chart performance ==
In France, "Déjeuner en paix" debuted at number 32 on the chart edition of 24 August 1991, climbed quickly and entered the top ten four weeks later, and reached its highest position, number two, for non-consecutive five weeks, being however unable to dethrone Lagaf's "La Zoubida", then Bryan Adams's "(Everything I Do) I Do It for You"; it remained for 12 weeks in the top ten and 22 weeks in the top 50. In Belgium (Wallonia), it peaked at number 8 for non-consecutive three weeks and totaled seven weeks in the top ten. On the European Hot 100 Singles, "Déjeuner en paix" debuted at number 85 on 21 September 1991, reached a peak of number 13 in the tenth week, and fell off the top 100 after 16 weeks of presence. Much played on radio before its physical release, it appeared from 9 July 1991 and for 11 weeks on the European Airplay Top 50 (before the chart definitely ended), with a peak at number 15 the last week.

== Track listings ==
- CD maxi – France, Germany
1. "Déjeuner en paix" (single) – 3:37
2. "Baudelaire's Waltz" (unreleased) – 2:05
3. "Déjeuner en paix" (unreleased version) – 4:55
- 7" single – France, Germany
1. "Déjeuner en paix" – 3:37
2. "Baudelaire's Waltz" (instrumental) – 2:05
- Cassette – France
1. "Déjeuner en paix" – 3:37
2. "Baudelaire's Waltz" (instrumental) – 2:05
- 12" maxi – Promo – France
1. "Déjeuner en paix" (single) – 3:55
- CD single – Promo – Canada
1. "Déjeuner en paix" (single) – 3:55

== Charts ==
Chart (1991–1992)	Peak position
Belgium (Ultratop 50 Wallonia)	8
Europe (European Airplay Top 50)	15
Europe (European Hot 100)	13
France (Airplay Chart [AM Stations])	1
France (SNEP)	2
Québec (Francophone chart)	12

== Release history ==
Country	Date	Format	Label
France	1991	CD maxi	Barclay
France	1991	7" single	Barclay
France	1991	Cassette	Barclay
France	1991	Promotional 12" maxi	Barclay
Germany	1991	CD maxi	Barclay
Germany	1991	7" single	Barclay
Canada	1991	Promotional CD single	Barclay
