= Pas d'ami (comme toi) =

1991 single by Stephan Eicher

Single by Stephan Eicher

from the album Engelberg
- B-side: "Demo October 1990"
- Released: December 1991
- Recorded: 1991
- Studio: Kursaal Casino Engelberg, Switzerland
- Genre: Pop rock, chanson
- Length: 3:29
- Label: Barclay
- Composer: Stephan Eicher
- Lyricist: Philippe Djian
- Producers: Stephan Eicher, Dominique Blanc-Francard

Stephan Eicher singles chronology
| "Déjeuner en paix" (1991) | "Pas d'ami (comme toi)" (1991) | "Hemmige" (1992) |

"Pas d'ami (comme toi)" is a 1991 pop rock song recorded by Swiss singer Stephan Eicher. Written by Philippe Djian and composed by Eicher, it was released in December 1991 as the second single from his sixth studio album Engelberg, on which it appears as the second track. It became a top ten hit in France.

== Lyrics ==
Written by Philippe Djian, "Pas d'ami (comme toi)" tells the story of a man who wonders about his powerful feelings for a friend. Indeed, the song's lyrics suggest that the narrator looks at this friend with love because he is attracted by his legs and his hair, and disturbed by his perfume and his hands when he touches him; however, his friend seems not to notice this situation. In fact, the narrator is referring to a man, which cannot be discerned orally, since the word "friend" (in French, "ami" without an "e") is spelled in its masculine grammatical form; therefore, although the song is often seen as a hymn to bromance between two men, it also seems to be about homosexuality. This interpretation is possible, as Djian had previously said that he had a gay brother and that he loved him; in addition, according to Eicher, this ambiguous text led to rumours about his sexuality.

In 2021, on the Ascension day, French priest Laurent referred to "Pas d'ami (comme toi)" as he considered that the song's lyrics are appropriate to express his ties with Jesus Christ.

"Pas d'ami (comme toi)" was later re-recorded in a new version with a choir composed of inhabitants of the town in the Camargue where Eicher has a house.

== Chart performance ==
In France, "Pas d'ami (comme toi)" debuted at number 37 on the chart edition of 28 December 1991, climbed quickly and entered the top ten four weeks later, and reached its highest position, number seven, in its eighth week; then it did not stop to drop and remained for 14 weeks in the top 50. On the European Hot 100 Singles, it debuted at number 90 on 25 January 1991, reached a peak of number 37 in the sixth week, and fell off the top 100 after nine weeks of presence.

== Track listings ==
- CD maxi
1. "Pas d'ami (comme toi)" – 3:29
2. "Pas d'ami (comme toi)" (demo October 1990) – 3:10
3. "Pas d'ami (comme toi)" (instrumental) – 3:49
- 7" single
1. "Pas d'ami (comme toi)" – 3:29
2. "Pas d'ami (comme toi)" (demo October 1990) – 3:10
- Cassette
1. "Pas d'ami (comme toi)" – 3:29
2. "Pas d'ami (comme toi)" (demo October 1990) – 3:10
- 12" single – Promo – France
1. "Pas d'ami (comme toi)" – 3:29
- CD single – Promo – Canada
1. "Pas d'ami (comme toi)" – 3:37

== Personnel ==
- Bass – Pino Palladino
- Drums – Manu Katché
- Executive-Producer – Martin Hess
- Guitar – Max Lässer
- Lyrics – Philippe Djian
- Music, vocals, 12-string acoustic guitar, electric guitar – Stephan Eicher
- Piano, organ [Hammond B3] – Simon Clark
- Producers – Dominique Blanc-Francard, Stephan Eicher

== Charts ==
| Chart (1991–1992) | Peak position |
|---|---|
| Europe (European Hot 100) | 37 |
| France (Airplay Chart [AM & FM Stations]) | 1 |
| France (SNEP) | 7 |
| Québec (Francophone chart) | 10 |

== Release history ==
| Country | Date | Format | Label |
|---|---|---|---|
| France | 1991 | CD maxi | Barclay |
| France | 1991 | 7" single | Barclay |
| France | 1991 | Cassette | Barclay |
| France | 1991 | Promotional 12" single | Barclay |
| Germany | 1991 | 7" single | Barclay |
| Canada | 1992 | Promotional CD single | Barclay |
