= Mittageisen (band) =

Swiss dark wave band

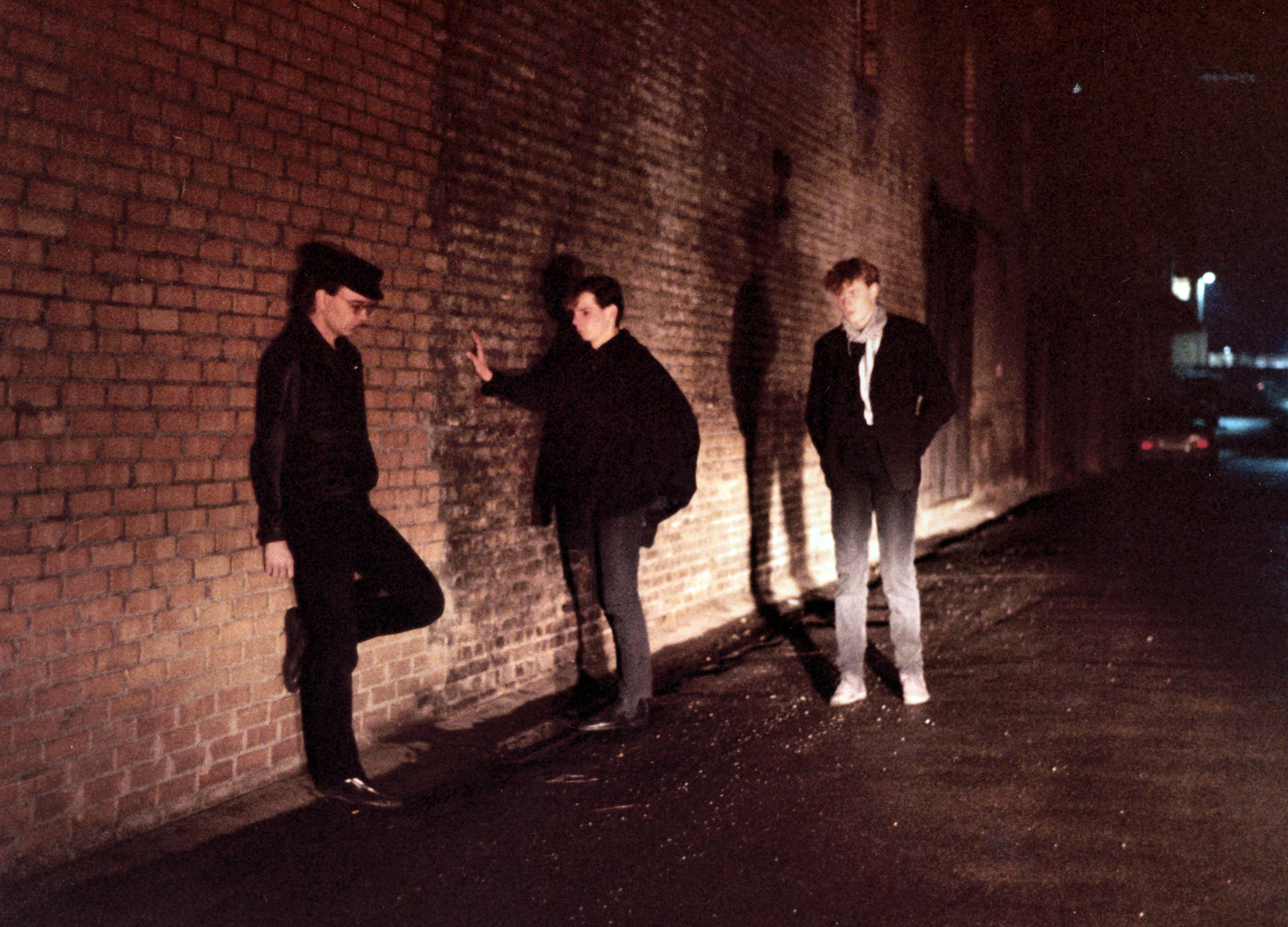
- Mittageisen 1982, left to right: Bruno W, Daniel S, Markus S

Background information
- Origin: Lucerne, Switzerland
- Genres: Post-punk, dark wave, new wave
- Years active: 1981–1986
- Label: mital-U
- Past members: Bruno W (1981-1986); Daniel S (1981-1986); Markus Sch (1981-1983); Manuela H (1983-1986); Markus St (1983, 1985-1986); Ursula S (1982)
- Website: www.mital-u.ch/mittageisen

mittageisen is a Swiss dark wave band of the early 1980s.

The name refers to "Mittageisen", a single by Siouxsie and the Banshees that makes use of a John Heartfield photomontage on the cover. This picture was originally published on the frontpage of the "Arbeiter-Illustrierte-Zeitung / Workers Illustrated Journal", published on 19 December 1935. Heartfield (1891–1968) was an early member of the Club Dada, which started 1916 as Cabaret Voltaire in Zürich. The picture with the title 'Hurrah, die Butter ist Alle! / Hurray, the butter is finished!' shows a family who eats various pieces of metal. The trigger for it was the following sentence of a Göring-speech: "Iron made a nation always strong, butter and lard made only the people fat."

== History ==
The group was initiated in 1981 by Bruno W (synthesizer, rhythm, voice/lyrics), after several punk activities (a.o. production of the first Swiss-Punk LP). The other initial members Daniel S (guitar) and Markus Sch (guitar, voice) played up to this time in local punk bands. A view months later Ursula S completed mittageisen as bass-player and the band recorded a demo-tape with six songs, which were partly published on the first album in 1983. Ursula S left the group shortly before the recording-sessions for their first album in the autumn 1982.

As a typical post-punk band mittageisen developed their own individual music style and became thereby

"one of the earliest Darkwave/electro Goth bands. These tracks were mostly recorded from '82 to '85 (seven of them in '82 when Depeche Mode still couldn't get enough), mixing the emerging Gothic sounds of the Banshees, Bauhaus and The Cure with the sparse electro of Kraftwerk. In general, it's slow, dark and morose with droning guitars and vocals, under-pinned by a sharp electro beat. In other ones, they are one of the archetypal darkwave bands who were releasing albums when the Sisters (of Mercy) were only working on their early EPs. There is, however, a very simple and obvious reason why this band do not occupy the same privileged position as the classic Goth bands - they didn't sing in English. Most of the tracks are in German, with one, 'persistance de la mémoire', in French. It's the kind of music you hear as the soundtrack for oppressive, dark German sci-fi films. The sound does not stay the same all the way through, 'automaten', which is here in two versions, is a fairly upbeat, electro piece. Others are more sound-scapey; droning pieces that evoke factory work. This CD is more than an historical oddity, it is a must for fans of early Sisters stuff, or the Cure's dark period which culminated in the oppressive 'Pornography'".

Beside the music the sociocritical, expressive lyrics written by Bruno W, supplemented the music arrestingly and attract the attention of the critics.

Among various concerts - also with other bands such as Liliput, The Vyllies and Propaganda - mittageisen became one of the most shaped Swiss new wave band, especially with the release of the first album in March 1983. They earned extraordinarily positive reviews and their album became ‘record of the week’ on Swiss Radio and the songs were played often on various radio stations especially in Germany, Austria and the Netherlands.

After the departure of Markus Sch (guitar) and the completion with Manuela H (synthesizer) mittageisen published in January 1985 the 12" single "automaten", with a for that time new electro sound. As Bruno W said in an interview the band wasn't satisfied with the first studio-version of "automaten" and he travelled to Cologne to mix the final-version in collaboration with Detlev Kühne (Die Hornissen) and Tom Dokoupil (The Wirtschaftswunder) at their studio. The 12" single found the way to the legendary John Peel and became 'record of the week' on various radio shows.

After last recording sessions in 1986 the band split up. Mastermind Bruno W published some years later under the name "mittageisen v2" the single "geld – arbeit / money – work", which was published in two editions with different versions. On the second edition he worked together with Marco Repetto, a member of the famous NDW-band Grauzone, Techno and Ambient DJ, musician and producer. For a few years now, Bruno W's music and video projects have been running under the name "mev2".

== Influence ==
2016 created the fashion designer Julia Seemann (who worked a.o. for Vivienne Westwood and Meadham Kirchhoff in London) the Capsule Collection 2016 as a TRIBUTE TO MITTAGEISEN. The collection was presented at the London Fashion Week 2016.

The skate enthusiasts from THE STRAIGHT AND NARROW publish, in relation with the re-release of the 12" „automaten“ 2016, a skate video with excerpts from various MITTAGEISEN-songs.

2014 „automaten“ is one of the Top 20 songs of the 'CH Hall of Fame 80s' presented at the exhibition 'OH YEAH! - Pop music in Switzerland' at the Museum of Communication in Bern .

== Discography ==
=== Singles ===
- 1985 – Automaten / Neues China (7" + 12")
- 2016 – Automaten / Neues China / Automaten (radio edit) (12")

=== Music-Cassettes ===
- 1981 – Im Niemandsland am Ende des 20. Jahrhunderts

=== Albums ===
- 1983 – Mittageisen (vinyl)
- 1994 – Alles ist anders … nichts hat sich geändert (CD)
- 2008 – 1981-1986 remastered (2CD)
- 2022 – demo-tape 1981 remastered (MP3)
- 2024 – 1983 remastered (MP3)

=== Videos ===
- 1995 - automaten
- 2016 - automaten (radio edit 2015)
- 2023 - automaten (-6y edit)
