= Kleenex/LiLiPUT =

Compilation album by LiLiPUT
- Released: 1993
- Recorded: 1978–1983
- Studio: Sunrise (Kirchberg); Kingsway (London); Gaskessel (Biel); Platinum (Oberehrendingen)
- Genre: Post-punk; punk rock
- Length: 136:50
- Label: Off Course

LiLiPUT chronology
Some Songs (1983)	Kleenex/LiLiPUT (1993)	Live Recordings, TV-Clips & Roadmovie (2010)

Professional ratings
Review scores
Source	Rating
AllMusic	4.5/5 stars
The Austin Chronicle	4.5/5 stars
Christgau's Consumer Guide	A
NME	9/10
Pitchfork	9.0/10
Spin	9/10
Spin Alternative Record Guide	9/10

Kleenex/LiLiPUT (also referred to as LiLiPUT) is a compilation album by Swiss punk rock band LiLiPUT. Released by Off Course Records in 1993, the album compiles the band's entire recorded output, from their first recordings under the name Kleenex to their later material after changing their name to LiLiPUT.

The album was reissued by Kill Rock Stars on 20 February 2001.

== Track listing ==
Disc one
No.	Title	Original release	Length
1.	"Nighttoad"	Previously unreleased (recorded 1978, as Kleenex)	3:04
2.	"Madness"	Previously unreleased (recorded 1978, as Kleenex)	3:02
3.	"Krimi"	Previously unreleased (recorded 1978, as Kleenex)	1:37
4.	"1978"	Previously unreleased (recorded 1978, as Kleenex)	1:01
5.	"Beri-Beri"	Kleenex (1978, as Kleenex)	2:04
6.	"Ain't You"	Kleenex	3:02
7.	"Hedi's Head"	Kleenex	2:10
8.	"Nice"	Kleenex	2:26
9.	"You"	"You" single (1979, as Kleenex)	3:16
10.	"Ü"	"You" single	2:30
11.	"Split"	"Split" single (1980, as LiLiPUT)	2:00
12.	"Die Matrosen"	"Split" single	3:55
13.	"Hitch-Hike"	Swiss Wave: The Album (1980, as LiLiPUT)	2:40
14.	"DC-10"	Swiss Wave: The Album	3:28
15.	"Thumblerdoll"	Previously unreleased (recorded 1980, as LiLiPUT)	2:51
16.	"Igel"	Previously unreleased (recorded 1980, as LiLiPUT)	1:44
17.	"Türk"	Previously unreleased (recorded 1980, as LiLiPUT)	2:50
18.	"Tisko"	Previously unreleased (recorded 1980, as LiLiPUT)	1:50
19.	"Wig-Wam"	Previously unreleased (recorded 1980, as LiLiPUT)	3:00
20.	"Eisiger Wind"	"Eisiger Wind" single (1980, as LiLiPUT)	3:25
21.	"When the Cat's Away"	"Eisiger Wind" single	2:17
22.	"I Had a Dream"	Previously unreleased (recorded c. 1981–82, as LiLiPUT)	3:10
23.	"Turn the Table"	Previously unreleased (recorded c. 1981–82, as LiLiPUT)	4:32
24.	"Dolly Dollar"	Previously unreleased (recorded c. 1981–82, as LiLiPUT)	3:09
Total length:			65:03

Disc two
No.	Title	Original release	Length
1.	"Do You Mind My Dream"	Liliput (1982, as LiLiPUT)	3:57
2.	"In a Mess"	Liliput	3:49
3.	"Birdy"	Liliput	2:57
4.	"Feel Like Snakes, Twisting Through the Fog"	Liliput	2:41
5.	"Tschik-Mo"	Liliput	3:36
6.	"Outburst"	Liliput	4:00
7.	"Umamm"	Liliput	2:23
8.	"Might Is Right"	Liliput	2:29
9.	"Like or Lump It"	Liliput	2:30
10.	"Ichor"	Liliput	2:39
11.	"Tong Tong"	Liliput	2:58
12.	"The Jatz"	"You Did It" single (1983, as LiLiPUT)	3:15
13.	"You Did It"	"You Did It" single	3:36
14.	"Ring-a-Ding-Dong"	Some Songs (1983, as LiLiPUT)	4:18
15.	"A Silver Key Can Open an Iron Lock Somewhere"	Some Songs	3:37
16.	"Your's Is Mine"	Some Songs	3:09
17.	"Blue Is All in Rush"	Some Songs	3:47
18.	"Terrified"	Some Songs	3:38
19.	"Étoile"	Some Songs	3:18
20.	"On Streets Without Names"	Some Songs	3:09
21.	"Boatsong"	Some Songs	3:58
22.	"His Head All Red"	Some Songs	2:03
Total length:			71:47

== Personnel ==
Credits are adapted from the album's liner notes.

LiLiPUT

- Lislot Ha (Lieselotte Hafner) – drums (disc one: tracks 1–19)
- Klaudia Schiff (Klaudia Schifferle) – bass, vocals, drums (disc two: tracks 1–11), guitar (disc two)
- Regula Sing – vocals (disc one: tracks 1–10)
- Marlene Marder (Marlene Marti) – guitar, bass (disc two), noises (disc two: tracks 1–11), percussion (disc two: tracks 1–11), vocals (disc one: tracks 20, 21)
- Chrigle Freund – vocals (disc one: tracks 11–21), drums (disc one: tracks 20, 21)
- Angie Barrack – saxophone (disc one: tracks 11–19), vocals (disc one: tracks 11–19)
- Christoph Herzog – saxophone (disc one: tracks 22–24)
- Beat Schlatter – drums (disc one: tracks 22–24; disc two: tracks 20–22)
- Astrid Spirit (Astrid Spirig) – vocals (disc one: tracks 22–24; disc two), bass (disc two: tracks 1–11), percussion (disc one: tracks 22–24; disc two), violin (disc two)

Additional musicians

- Major (Klaus Heuser) – bongos (disc two: tracks 15, 20, 22)
- Juliana Müller – piano (disc two: tracks 14, 17)
- Susanne Müller – saxophone (disc two: track 20)

Production

- Bob Broglia – recording (disc one: tracks 9, 10)
- Etienne Conod – recording (disc one: tracks 1–8, 11–14)
- Dr. Rolf Schmidt – remastering
- Schweizer Radio DRS – recording (disc one: tracks 11–19)
- Röbel Vogel – recording (disc one: tracks 20, 21)
- Harry Zindel – recording (disc two)

Design

- Katja Becker – photography
- Byland & Zuber Graficdesign – graphic design
- LiLiPUT – photography
- Livio Piatti – photography
- Klaudia Schiff – cover artwork
