= Stephan Eicher =

Swiss singer

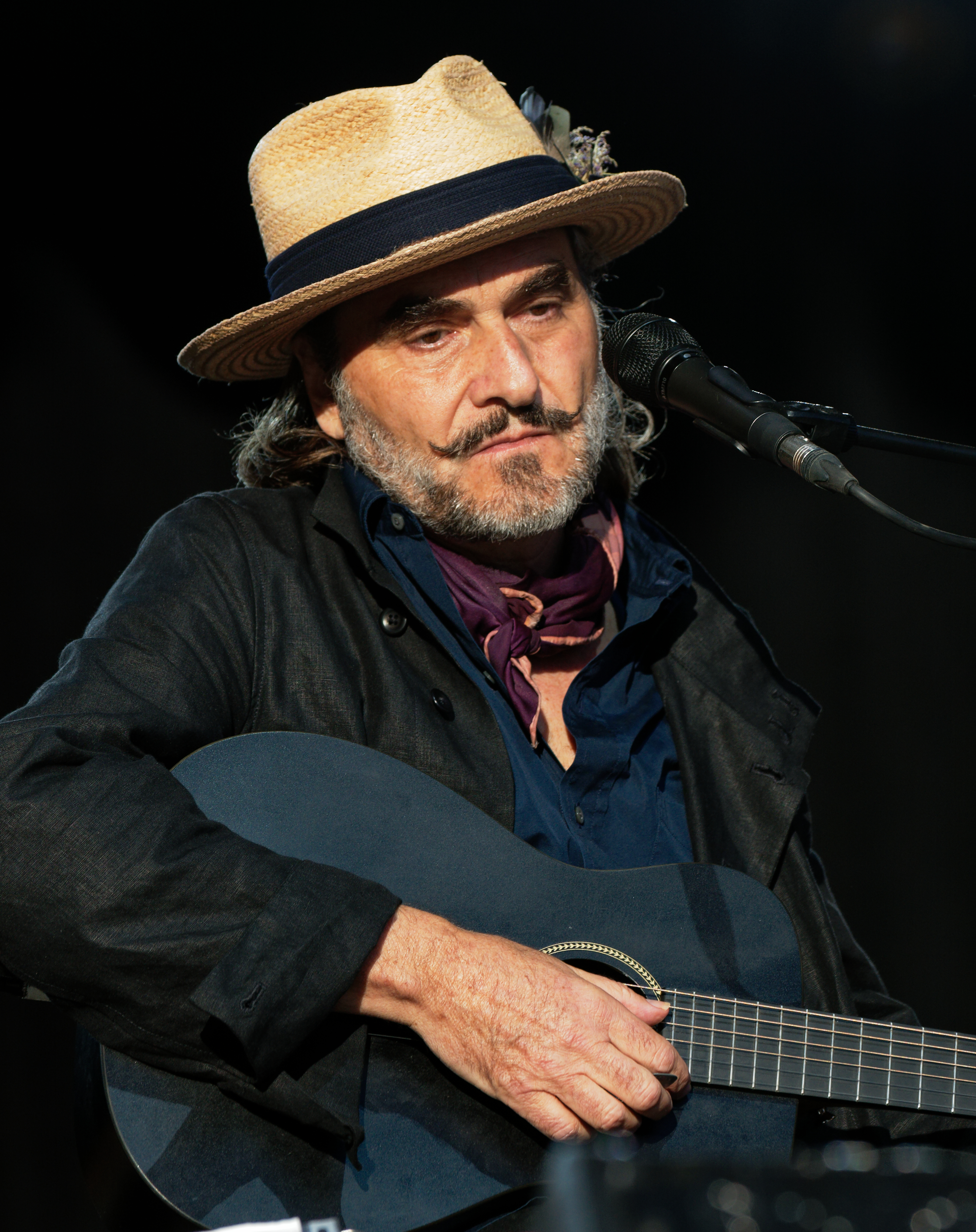
- Eicher in 2021

Background information
- Born: 17 August 1960 (age 66); Münchenbuchsee, Switzerland
- Genres: Post-punk, pop
- Occupations: Singer, songwriter
- Instruments: Vocals, guitar
- Years active: 1978–present
- Website: www.stephan-eicher.com

Stephan Eicher (born 17 August 1960) is a Swiss singer. He sings in a variety of languages, including French, German, English, Italian, Swiss German and Romansh, sometimes using different languages in the same song.

Eicher's success started in German-speaking countries in the 1980s when, as part of the band Grauzone, he had a hit single, Eisbär. With hit songs such as Combien de Temps and Oh Ironie, his popularity spread across Europe with albums, tours and chart success in France and Switzerland.

== Life ==
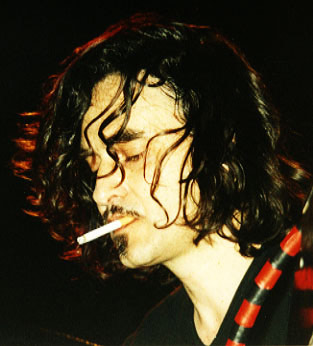
Eicher performing in 2002

Stephan Eicher was born in the rural municipality of Münchenbuchsee not far from Bern. His mother is Alsatian and his father is Yeniche. His father is also a musician.

Eicher was educated at the Ecole d'Humanité, an international boarding school in Switzerland, and musically trained at the academy of art in Zürich, where he learned how to use the computer for composing music.

He released his first single Eisbär, together with his brother Martin, on the album Grauzone in 1980. He became interested in French songs by Jacques Dutronc, Georges Brassens and Serge Gainsbourg, and these influences led to the album Les Chansons bleues. This album is also inspired by the American singers he listened to during his youth, such as Patti Smith, Johnny Cash and Bob Dylan.

His two subsequent albums began to establish his reputation. The album, I Tell This Night, and the single Two People in a Room were released in 1985. It peaked on the Swiss charts at number ten and stayed twelve weeks. Two years later, the album Silence reached number three and was in the Swiss Top 10 for fourteen weeks. Both albums were created by Stephan Eicher almost single-handedly.

1989's My Place went in a different direction. The French lyrics were written by his friend, author Philippe Djian. His largest commercial success came in 1991 with the album Engelberg, which spent five weeks at number one in Switzerland and 46 weeks on the charts in total. The song Déjeuner en paix was also number two in France. It is the beginning of a collaboration with Manu Katché and Pino Palladino which lasted until the release of 1000 vies in 1996. His subsequent albums regularly reached the top five on the Swiss album charts.

Following a world tour, which included concerts in Africa, he produced his first live album in 1994 (Non ci badar, guarda e passa).

Since 1989, his song lyrics have been written by Djian.

In 2001, Eicher released his first greatest hits compilation album entitled Hotel*s. For many years, the hotel Hess on the Swiss Engelberg was his second home. Martin Hess, the hotelier couple's son, became his close friend and producer. At the hotel, the albums Engelberg and Louanges developed. Eicher selected the title Hotel*s as homage to this grand hotel, which was torn down in the same year. For the title selection for the album, he let the fans co-ordinate with the official homepage.

== Cover versions of his songs ==
- Singer Sian Charia recorded a cover version of Eicher's Pas d'ami (translated into Khmer) in Phnom Penh in 1995.
- German metal band Vanden Plas covered Des Hauts, des Bas on their AcCult EP in 1996.
- His song Combien de Temps has been remixed by Flood.
- Experimental electronic music group Cabaret Voltaire recorded a cover version of Eicher's No Escape. Originally written by The Seeds
- Metal band Stahlhammer released a cover version of Eisbär on their album Eisenherz.
- On the newer edition of the album Wahrheit oder Pflicht by Oomph! a cover version of Eisbär is included as a bonus track.
- German rock band Eisbrecher included a cover version of Eisbär in their 2017 album Sturmfahrt.
- Australian Brigitte Handley & The Dark Shadows recorded Eisbär for their 2014 album Autumn Still.

== Other participations ==
- Eicher has recorded a cover version of the jazz standard My Funny Valentine.
- In the past 25 years, Stephan Eicher has collaborated with numerous musicians. He also participates in many large European Festivals. I Muvrini (Corsica), Ismael Lo (Senegal), Axelle Red (Belgium), and Texas (UK) have all been guests on his tours.
- Eicher also produces Swiss musician Tinu Heiniger.

== Discography ==
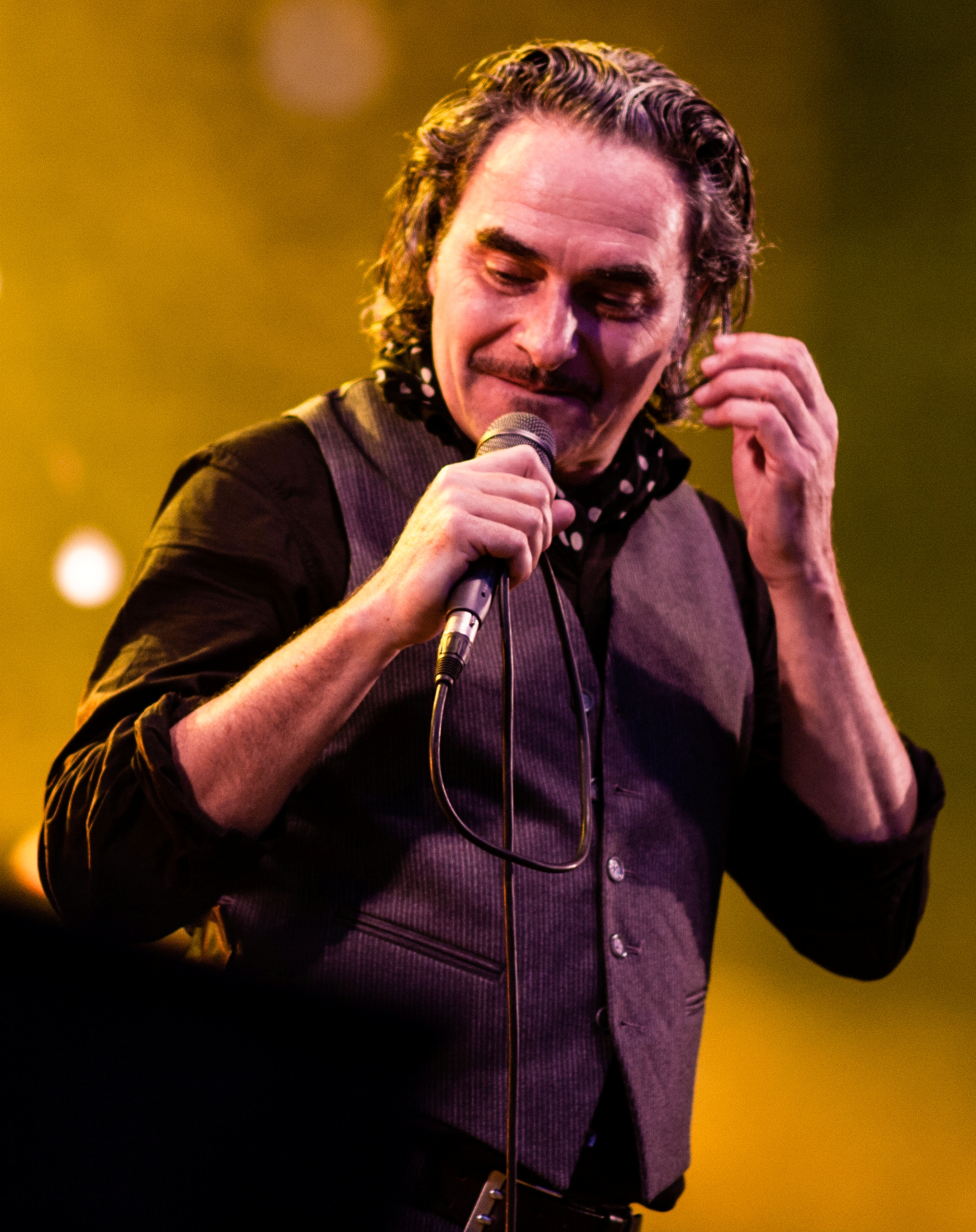
Eicher in 2012

Singles

Stephan Eicher at the Baloise Session 2026 in Basel.

- Déjeuner en paix (1991)
- Pas d'ami (comme toi) (1991)
- Hemmige (1992)
- Tu ne me dois rien (1992)

With Grauzone

- Eisbär (1981)
- Grauzone (1980)

Solo

- Noise Boys (1980)
- Souvenir (1982)
- Les Chansons bleues (1983)
- I Tell This Night (1985)
- Silence (1987)
- My Place (1989)
- Engelberg (1991)
- Carcassonne (1993)
- Non Ci Badar, Guarda e Passa (1994)
- 1000 Vies (1996)
- Louanges (1999)
- Hotel*s (2001)
- Taxi Europa (2003)
- Tour Taxi Europa (2004)
- Eldorado (2007)
- L'Envolée (2012)
- Song Book (2017)
- Hüh with Traktorkestar (2019)
- Homeless Songs (2019)
- Ode (2022)
- Poussière D’Or (2025)
