= Christine Lauterburg =

Swiss singer

Christine Lauterburg (born 12 March 1956 in Bern) is a Swiss singer and yodeler. Lauterburg often remakes Swiss folk songs but also composes her own music. In contrast to most contemporary Swiss musicians, who use the Anglo-Saxon folk songs as a foundation, Lauterburg develops her music from local roots. Lauterburg performs solo and in various groups. The style of her music is often referred to as Swiss folk music, folk, pop, techno, or world music.

== Early life ==
Lauterburg was born in an artistic oriented family and spent her childhood in Bern and Bolligen. Her father Hans Rudolf Lauterburg as well as her mother Lotti Lauterburg-Wunsch were freelance graphic artists. As a child, Lauterburg learned to play the violin and finished her studies as an elementary school educator. She later graduated from the drama school in Bern as an actress.

== Career ==
=== Early work ===
After graduation from drama school in the early 1980s, Lauterburg acted in many Swiss movies and theaters of that time. Her debut was in a film named "Eine vo dene" (1981) from Bruno Nick to be followed by "E Nacht lang Füürland" (1981) from Clemens Klopfenstein/Remo Legnazzi, "Akropolis Now" (1983), from Hans Liechti, "Der Ruf der Sibylla" (1984), from Clemens Klopfenstein, "Alpenglühen" (1987), from Norbert Wiedmer/Silvia Horisberger, "Macao oder die Rückseite des Meeres" (1988), from Clemens Klopfenstein, "Mikes Brother", "Restlessness" (1991) from Thomas Imbach. These were films about the atmosphere of departure in the 1980s when there was a strong attempt to fight for spaces where the young could turn their utopian ideas into reality.

At the same time Lauterburg would perform as a musician with different bands. She gradually ventures into the domestic musical roots and explores the traditional Swiss folk music. Lauterburg learns how to yodel as an autodidact. She develops her own unique ways to yodel which gives her music a great share of grace and intensity. Later she learns how to play the Langnauer accordion (Langnauerörgeli) along with her singing. Lauterburg's first music recordings was the music to the film "Macao oder die Rückseite des Meeres" from Clemens Klopfenstein.

=== 1990s ===
At the end of the 80s Lauterburg would completely turn to music. Finally, after thirty years of my life I have found out what I can sing: Songs in my own language and the ancient Juchz (shout of joy). 1991 Lauterburg releases her first album named Schynige Platte recorded with Res Margot who plays old Swiss instruments. 1994 the album is followed by Echo der Zeit in coproduction with the Swiss folk music expert Cyrill Schläpfer and the dancefloor producer Pascal de Sapio. The idea was to blend traditional Swiss folk music with contemporary dance- and pop music. Some of the voice recordings were made outside the studio for example on the trail alongside of the river Aare or above the timberline of the Swiss alps. At the time, the fusion of traditional and modern music has triggered intense indignation among some of the traditional Swiss musicians. The Swiss National Yodel Association stated: "What Lauterburg sings has no culture". There were comments like: "An ugly intrusion into our culture of yodeling". On the other side there was also praise even from the traditional music circles and Echo der Zeit populated the Swiss charts for 19 weeks.

At the beginning of the 90s Lauterburg was touring as a singer under her own name and in other formations like Trio 9, Flädermüüs mit Housi Wittlin through Switzerland, Austria, Germany, Italy, France, Spain, Canada, USA, Ecuador, China and Africa. The CD "Trio 9 – Live im EI International" appeared in 1994. Besides songs in the Swiss German dialect from the locally well known Housi Wittlin the CD also featured songs from Lauterburg. The CD Paradiesvogel was released in 1996 by taking up the music from Echo der Zeit but there were also linguistic elements and music styles from other countries. Lauterburg's interpretation of the ancient Swiss folk song "S'Vreneli vom Guggisberg" was a big success and it populated the Swiss charts for nine weeks.

=== 2000s ===
Lauterburg is engaged as a singer in several ethnic music projects along with Corin Curschellas and Walther Lietha in the formations eCHo and Doppelbock. The engagement is to interpret selected old traditional Swiss folk songs in new ways. The result is a Swiss folk music that differentiates from the musical mainstream. The result of that period was a series of CDs like: «S hät deheim en Vogel xunge» (2000), «Pro Helvetia» (2001), «Rund um de Buuchnabel» (2003), «Obio!» (2006), «Schnitter – i hole di o» (2007), «Voodoo-Jodel» (2009).

In the summer 2002 Lauterburg appeared at two distinguished appearances: At the festival "Live At Sunset" that took place at the Swiss National Museum in Zürich along with the American singer artist Bobby McFerrin and at the Expo02 together with the legendary Austrian folk singer Hubert von Goisern. Lauterburg sings and performs with Max Lässer and his Überlandorchester in the years 2002 and 2003. The concert in the Kammgarn in Schaffhausen was recorded and released on DVD in 2004. Lauterburg sings in a duet with the popular chansonnier Michael von der Heide the song "Madeleine" von Abbé Joseph Bovet (1879–1951) on Heide's album Helvetia. Lauterburg acts and sings in the very successful open-air theater play "Dällebach Kari" that was staged on the Gurten mountain at Bern during the summers of 2006 and 2007.

Ten years after Paradiesvogel Lauterburg released her fourth solo album Alles bleibt anders. In this production Lauterburg further developed her musical diversity. Here she mixes booming basses with solid beats to create a light ambient floor over which she puts her distinctive voice with her characteristic Juchz (Swiss crow). "Alles bleibt anders" (engl.: Everything Remains Different) is the title of the first track the last track which is finally heard after 32 minutes of sound of a rippling mountain creek is entitled "Nichts bleibt gleich" (engl.: Nothing Remains The Same).

The dance company "d'Schwyz Tanzt" is a group of folk dancers which strongly represents Switzerland a vital, open and contemporary country which is also aware of the roots its own cultural heritage. Lauterburg was invited as an actress and musician as part of the plays "putzt und gstrählt" 2006 and "Salz-Sel-Salina" (2008/2009).

Jürg Steinmeier is a storyteller and connoisseur of ancient Swiss tales. He creates and brings his figures to life with enthusiastic commitment using his body and spoken words. Lauterburg and Dide Marfurt play music to legends and fairy tales from the old times. "Chilte und Wybe" (2007) and "Pureschlau" (2008) are pieces which were mostly staged on the grounds of various old farm houses throughout Switzerland.

In 2008 the band Aërope was formed around Lauterburg. The four band members are all well known Swiss musicians: Andi Hug, drums, Hank Shizzoe, guitar, Michel Poffet, bass and Markus Flückiger, accordion. The four musician represent different stiles of music which reinforces the playfully synthesis of the renewed old folk songs with contemporary sounds. The refined diverse music from Aërope marks another culmination of Lauterburg's work.

=== 2010s ===
Lauterburg plays her Album Allein in spring 2010. The music was created on a hike Lauterburg undertook alone out of an urban landscape up to the lake Seebergsee. She carried the recorder in her backpack and recorded nine songs at different inspiring places along the trail. Some were her own songs and some are traditional Swiss folk songs from Max Huggler. Parts of the material was later supplemented by guitarist Hank Shizzoe in the studio. Hank coproduced the album.

=== 2018 ===
Robert Boesiger published a book in German about Christine Lauterburg in the form of encounters with nationally acclaimed individuals and persons who had a significant impact on Christine's work.

== Albums ==
Solo:

- Schynige Platte, 1991
- Echo der Zeit, 1994
- Paradiesvogel, 1996
- Alles bleibt anders, 2006
- Aërope, 2008
- ALL EIN, 2010

With eCHo:

- s’het deheim e vogel xunge, 2000
- Pro Helvetia, 2001
- Schnitter – i hole di o, 2007

With Doppelbock:

- Rund um de Buuchnabel, 2003
- Obio, 2006
- Voodoo-Jodel, 2009

Others:

- Macao (Musik zum gleichnamigen Film), 1987
- Trio 9 (mit Housi Wittlin), 1994
- Michael von der Heide – Helvetia, 2003
- Begegnungen (live, mit Theodosii Spassov), 2003
- Jimmy-Flitz, e Reis dür d Schwyz (Musikhörspiel mit Roland Zoss), 2007
- Max Lässer und das Überlandorchester – Überländler, 2008

== Awards ==
- "Bäredräckpris of the City of Bern" (first female awardee), 1994
- "Postage stamp about Swiss traditions" (for the 100th anniversary of the Swiss Federal Yodeling Association), 2010
- "Ravensburger Kupferle" (for the music with Aërope), 2013
- "Schweizer Musikpreis" (Swiss National Music Award), 2021
- "Berner Musikpreis" (Music Award of the Canton Bern, Switzerland, 2023

== Literature ==
- Andreas Kotte, ed. (2005). "Christine Lauterburg". Theaterlexikon der Schweiz / Dictionnaire du théâtre en Suisse / Dizionario Teatrale Svizzero / Lexicon da teater svizzer [Theater Dictionary of Switzerland]. Vol. 2. Zürich: Chronos. pp. 1087–1088. ISBN 978-3-0340-0715-3. LCCN 2007423414. OCLC 62309181.
