= 7 Dollar Taxi =

Swiss band

7 Dollar Taxi is a four-member Indie / Pop / Rock band from Lucerne, Switzerland. It consists of:

- Tizian von Arx - Guitar/Vocals
- César von Arx - Bass/Vocals
- Christoph Zurflueh - Guitar/Vocals
- Simon Wigger - Drums
- Ralph Zöllig - Keys

== Biography ==
The band was formed in 2004 by Tizian von Arx, his younger brother César von Arx, Simon Wigger, and Christoph Zurflueh. In the following years, 7 Dollar Taxi played in venues across Europe, supporting bands such as Babyshambles, The Blood Arm, The Blue Van, Maxïmo Park, Madsen, The Automatic, Franz Ferdinand, Grouplove, Metronomy, Moby and many others. They were offered a contract with the London-based Label Upper11 but, after many delays, ultimately, didn't sign.

"Do The Robot," the band's first single, was released on Kurofune records in Japan, and became iTunes Single of the Month.

Their first album, Come And Figure It Out, had its European release in 2006 in Switzerland, followed by Japan and the United Kingdom in 2008. The fourth album «Bomb Shelter Romance» was released on 13 September 2019.

== Discography ==
Come And Figure It Out

1. Do The Robot
2. I Go Yeah
3. Come And Figure It Out
4. Jurassic Heads
5. Loser
6. Mr. Jukebox
7. Kings Of The Universe
8. Adam
9. [It Ain`t time to say] goodbye
10. Radio Monotone
11. Do You Like Me

Labels: (UK) - 2008, Bandorama (CH) 2006

Come And Figure It Out

1. Do The Robot
2. I Go Yeah
3. Come And Figure It Out
4. Jurassic Heads
5. Loser
6. Mr. Jukebox
7. Kings Of The Universe
8. Adam
9. [It Ain`t time to say] goodbye
10. Radio Monotone
11. Do You Like Me
12. Red Lips (BONUS TRACK)

Labels: Kurofune (JP) 2008 Producer: Marco Jencarelli and 7 Dollar Taxi
Recorded: Marco Jencarelli at Soundfarm Studios – Kriens, Switzerland
Engineered: Marco Jencarelli at Soundfarm Studios – Kriens, Switzerland
Mixed: Marco Jencarelli at Soundfarm Studios – Kriens, Switzerland
Mastered by : Marco Jencarelli at Soundfarm Studios – Kriens, Switzerland

Well, It's about Time
1. Sputnik & Laika
2. Downtown
3. Wicked Witch
4. Killjoy
5. Hobbin Rude
6. Looking Like You Need Some Sleep
7. Survival Of The Fittest
8. Camden Bargain
9. Kitchen Floor
10. Lynchtime
11. That Night In December
12. The World Is Ending
13. Check Your Time
14. Red Lips
Label: Global Satellite (2012)

Anything Anything
1. Anything Anything
2. Postcard From St. Barbara
3. Local Frog
4. Beg For Mercy
5. Daily Routine
6. Future U
7. Night Like This Feat. Pablito
8. End (Of A Long Night)
9. Nowhere Without You
10. Midgets On Mars
11. Winning Horse
12. One More Last Chance
13. 10:10
Label: CLAXMUSIC records (2014)

Bomb Shelter Romance

1. Tentacles
2. Surrender
3. Nothing To Lose
4. Rocket Man
5. Common Sense
6. Treat Me Somehow
7. Are You Ready
8. Vegan Viking
9. Snowman Melting
10. Conquer The World
11. Andalucia
12. On And On

Label: CLAXMUSIC records (2019)
