= John Bonica =

American anesthesiologist, professional wrestler

- Born: John Joseph Bonica; February 16, 1917; Filicudi, Sicily, Italy
- Died: August 15, 1994 (aged 77); Rochester, Minnesota, United States
- Citizenship: Italian / American
- Scientific career
- Fields: Anesthesiology / Pain Medicine

John Joseph Bonica (February 16, 1917 – August 15, 1994) was a Sicilian American anesthesiologist and professional wrestler known as the founding father of the discipline of pain medicine.

When his wife had a life-threatening experience with open drop anesthesia for the birth of their first child, John developed a new mission – the introduction of regional anesthetic techniques for obstetrical anesthesia. Emma was one of the first women to have epidural anesthesia for the birth of their second child.

== Early life ==
Born in Filicudi, off the coast of Sicily, in 1917, he emigrated with his family to the United States in 1927, becoming naturalized citizens in 1928. John's father, Antonino Bonica, a deputy Mayor and director of the postal service in Filicudi, eventually became a supervisor at the American Telephone and Telegraph Company. His mother, Angela Zagame, was a midwife and practical nurse.

After his father died in 1932, the 15-year-old Bonica assumed responsibility of the household, by shining shoes and selling newspapers and produce. He became the youngest Eagle Scout in the history of Brooklyn.

== Wrestling career ==
John Bonica
Personal information
- Born: John Joseph Bonica; February 16, 1917 Filicudi, Sicily
- Died: August 15, 1994 (aged 77) Rochester, Minnesota
- Spouse: Emma Louise Baldetti (m. 1942)

Professional wrestling career
- Ring name(s): Johnny "Bull" Walker; Masked Marvel

Bonica entered amateur wrestling in high school to pay his way through school and fulfill his dream to go to college. He went on to win championships in the city and state levels. After such a successful high school stint, at age 19, Bonica began to wrestle professionally at carnivals, and continued to do it throughout his years of college at Long Island University and medical school at Marquette University School of Medicine in Milwaukee. He once defeated the entire 36 member wrestling team of an upstate New York college in one day. His monikers included the Masked Marvel and Johnny "Bull" Walker. Bonica wrestled many of the contemporary greats including Jim Londos, Ed "Strangler" Lewis, and had a one-hour draw with Lou Thesz. He won the light heavyweight championship of Canada in 1939. In 1941, Bonica added the NWA World Light Heavyweight Championship to his resume. The years of gladiatorial competition left Dr. Bonica a chronic pain sufferer himself, and thus empathizer with his patients. He would be awarded the Professional Wrestling Hall of Fame New York State Award in 2004.

== Championships and accomplishments ==
- National Wrestling Alliance
  - NWA World Light Heavyweight Championship (1 time)
- Professional Wrestling Hall of Fame and Museum, Class of 2004
- Other
  - Canadian Light Heavyweight Championship

== Academic career ==
Bonica graduated from Marquette University School of Medicine in Wisconsin in 1942. The same year he married Emma Louise Baldetti.

Bonica completed residency in anesthesiology at Saint Vincent's Catholic Medical Center in Manhattan. He then joined the United States Army in 1944, where at age 27 he was appointed Chief of Anesthesiology at Madigan Army Medical Center in Fort Lewis, Washington for the next three years. He became a captain. His treatment of so many WW2 veterans inspired him to dedicate himself to understand and alleviate pain.

In 1947, John left the Army and became Chief of Anesthesia at Tacoma General Hospital. He devoted his career to the study of pain, establishing it as a multidisciplinary field. He believed a team approach to the field of pain management, incorporating various specialties to treat acute and chronic pain. His concept for these pain clinics developed in the 1950s and by 1977, 175 pain centers were operative in the United States. He created residency programs, chaired departments, wrote standard texts in the field, and had his work published in numerous languages. In 1966 he became president of the American Society of Anesthesiology.

In 1960 Bonica founded the Department of Anesthesiology at the University of Washington School of Medicine in Seattle where he established his Multidisciplinary Pain Center.

Bonica died of a cerebral hemorrhage at age 77 at St. Mary's Hospital in Rochester, Minnesota. His wife died in the same summer.

== Publications ==
Bonica wrote and edited 41 books, while contributing to 60 others. 241 articles bear his authorship. Considered a standard in the field, his The Management of Pain was published in 1953. His masterpiece was considered The Management of Pain, Second Edition (1990). After his wife nearly died on anaesthesia related complications during the birth of their first child, Bonica began to focus on the study of pain control. His subsequent Principles and Practice of Obstetric and Analgesic Anesthesia (1967, 1994) became an enduring legacy used worldwide. In 1990, Pope John Paul II requested to have a copy of The Management of Pain for his own personal library.

== Affiliated organizations ==
- Founder of the International Association of the Study of Pain in 1973
- Founder and former director of the Multidisciplinary Pain Center at the University of Washington Medical Center in Seattle
- Eight lectureships and fellowships around the world bear his name, including the John J. and Emma Bonica Endowed Chair for Anesthesiology and Pain Research at the University of Washington School of Medicine, and the John J. Bonica Trainee Fellowship of the International Association for the Study of Pain.
- President American Society of Anesthesiologists
- President of the World Federation of Societies of Anaesthesiologists

== Awards and honors ==
During his long career, Bonica received international acclaim and awards:

- Golden Medal from the University of Palermo in 1954
- Commendatore and Grand Officer of the Knights of the Order of Merit of the Republic of Italy in 1967
- Honorary Fellow of the Faculty of Anaesthetists, Royal College of Surgeons of England
- Silver Medal by Swedish Medical Society in 1969
- Gold Medal for Neurosciences from the German Neurophysiologic Society in 1972
- Honorary Doctorate of Science Degrees from the Medical Colleges of Wisconsin and Northwestern University
- Honorary Doctorate from Siena University, Italy
- Chevalier of the Noble Order of Cingolo Militare (founded 1085)
- Distinguished Service Award of the American Society of Anesthesiologists
