= Klaudia Schifferle =

Swiss artist

Klaudia Schifferle (born September 22, 1955, in Zürich) is a Swiss painter and musician. Schifferle is a previous member of the all women punk group Kleenex, where she performed vocals and bass.

As of 2021 she is in the band ONETWOTHREE with Madlaina Peer and Sara Schär. All three play bass, and their record was released by Kill Rock Stars in October 2021.
