= Eisbär =

Single by Grauzone
- Released: 1981
- Recorded: 1980
- Genre: Neue Deutsche Welle; post-punk
- Length: 4:46
- Songwriter: Martin Eicher
- Producers: Urs Steiger, Grauzone

Grauzone singles chronology
"Moskau" (1980)	"Eisbär" (1981)	"Träume mit mir" (1982)

"Eisbär" (German for "polar bear"; pronounced [ˈaɪsbɛːɐ̯]) is a 1980 song by the Swiss Neue Deutsche Welle band Grauzone. A cult hit, it first appeared on the 1980 compilation album Swiss Wave – The Album. The shorter single version was later collected on the Grauzone album Die Sunrise Tapes (1998).

The song features a man singing he wants to be "a polar bear in the cold polar", because by being one he "wouldn't have to cry any longer and everything would be fine." The instrumental arrangement also evokes an Arctic atmosphere.

Grauzone recorded in 1982 an English-language version (Polar Bear) of the song, which was first released in 2010 on the double CD Grauzone 1980–1982 Remastered.

The song is post-punk performed with guitar, drums and synthesizers.

== Track listing ==
7" single (1981)
A "Eisbär" (4:17)
B "Ich lieb sie" (I Love Her) (3:18)

12" single (1981)
A "Eisbär" (4:17)
B1 "Ich lieb sie" (3:18)
B2 "Film 2" (3:35)

== Chart performance ==
Chart (1980)	Peak position
Austrian Singles Chart	6
German Singles Chart	12

== Covers and cultural references ==
- In 1990, Polar Pop (feat. Mc Grzimek) released a house version of the song.
- In 1993, Prisonshake released a cover version on the B-side of their "Two Sisters" single.
- In 1996, Scholle (ohne Schwester C.) produced a dance version on the compilation NDD – New German Dancefloor Stufe 3.
- In 1997, The Belgian hard house disc jockey Frédéric de Backer released a cover of the song under the pseudonym GrooveZone. It was released in 24 countries and sold over 300,000 copies.
- In 2001, The Austrian Neue Deutsche Härte band Stahlhammer covered this song, it appears on the album Eisenherz (2006).
- In 2003, Knorkator feat. Holger Klein interpreted the song.
- In 2004, The German band Razzia covered Eisbär on their album Relativ Sicher Am Strand (2004)
- In 2004, The German Neue Deutsche Härte band Oomph! released their version of the song as a B-side on the single "Augen Auf!", and on a new edition version of Wahrheit oder Pflicht.
- In 2006, The French band Nouvelle Vague recorded a version of the song for their album Bande à Part
- The Dresden Dolls has covered the song in live concerts.
- Rodolphe Burger has covered the song in live concerts with Stéphane Eicher as guest.
- In 2016, the song featured in the Swiss-French animated film My Life as a Courgette.
- In 2016, Mexican stoner rock band SUPERHIGH recorded a Spanish version titled "Oso Polar", and released it as a digital single.
- In 2016, Deathline International covered this song on their Eisbär EP.
- In 2017, The German Neue Deutsche Härte band Eisbrecher covered this song on their Sturmfahrt album.
- In 2018 the band Mind Spiders covered the song and translated the lyrics to English on their album Furies.
- In 2020 Eisbär was added to the Grand Theft Auto radio station, Kult F.M.
- In 2021, Sam Vance-Law released a cover of the song on his NDW EP.
- In 2021 the band Melenas from Navarra (Spain) released their version of the song called "Osa Polar" in Spanish.
- In 2022, German group Brutalismus 3000 released a cover of the song as a single.
- In 2023, Swiss group YC-CY performed the song on their tour.
