= Grauzone =

Swiss rock band

- Origin: Switzerland
- Genres: Neue Deutsche Welle, post-punk
- Years active: 1980–1982
- Members: Martin Eicher (1980–1982); Marco Repetto (1980–1981); GT (1980–1981); Claudine Chirac (1980); Stephan Eicher (1981–1982); Ingrid Bernay (1982)

Grauzone (German for "grey area", [ˈɡraʊ̯.tsoːnə]) was a band from Bern, Switzerland, that was active and disbanded in the early 1980s. The band is most famous for their 1981 hit "Eisbär" ("Polar Bear"). The single charted at number 12 in Germany and number 6 in Austria. In addition to "Eisbär", they had some success with the singles "Film 2" and "Wütendes Glas".

== History ==
=== Foundation ===
At the end of 1979, Marco Repetto (drums) and GT (bass) left the punk band Glueams to form a new band called Grauzone with Martin Eicher (guitar, vocals, synthesizer). Martin had already supported Glueams on their single '"Mental".

Grauzone's first concert was in March 1980 at club Spex in Bern. Martin's brother Stephan Eicher (guitar, synthesizer), Max Kleiner and Claudine Chirac (saxophone) supplemented the group temporarily in live appearances and recordings.

The band found some commercial success to their resentment, their first single Eisbär charting well in Germany and Austria.

After ten concerts, four singles and an album the group split up at the end of 1982.

=== After Grauzone ===
GT and Marco Repetto formed a new band Missing Link, later Eigernordwand, with the former Glueams guitarist Martin Pavlinec and the drummer Dominique Uldry. GT supplemented the futurism oriented performance group "Red Catholic Orthodox Jewish Chorus" around performance artist Edy Marconi, in which occasionally Marco Repetto also played. Later the group changed their name to I Suonatori.

Stephan Eicher started a successful solo career.

In 1988, Martin Eicher published his solo-EP Spellbound Lovers. In 1989, Marco Repetto started a new career as a Techno and Ambient DJ, musician and producer (a.o. mittageisen v2).

== Discography ==
=== Studio albums ===
- 1981 – Grauzone (D No. 37)

=== Compilation albums ===
- 1998 – Die Sunrise Tapes
- 2010 – Grauzone 1980–1982 (double album – remastered)

=== Singles ===
- 1981 – "Eisbär/Ich lieb sie" (D No. 12, A No. 6)
- 1981 – "Moskau/Ein Tanz mit dem Tod/Ich lieb sie"
- 1982 – "Träume mit mir/Wütendes Glas"
- 1983 – "Moskau/Film 2"
