= The Wirtschaftswunder =

German band

The Wirtschaftswunder (sometimes simply called Wirtschaftswunder) was a German band consisting of musicians Angelo Galizia (vocals, Italy), Tom Dokoupil (guitar, Czechoslovakia), Mark Pfurtschneller (keyboards, Canada) and Jürgen Beuth (drums, Germany). They were part of the so-called Neue Deutsche Welle that emerged as part of the English new wave/post-punk movement in the early 1980s and included bands such as D.A.F, Malaria!, or ZK (predecessor of Die Toten Hosen).

They entered the national arena with their single Der Kommissar (based on the theme music of the German criminal TV series Der Kommissar from the 1960s) and released their first album (Salmobray) in 1981. Their most characteristic feature was Angelo Galizia's singing with a heavy Italian accent. After signing with label Deutsche Grammophon, they released their 2nd album (The Wirtschaftswunder), which was not as experimental as the first. After their 4th album Pop Adenauer in the same year and their final single in 1984 they dissolved.

== Band name ==
The term Wirtschaftswunder (German for "economic miracle") describes the rapid reconstruction and development of the economies of West Germany and Austria after World War II.

== Discography ==
Singles

- "Allein" (1980)
- "Television" (1980)
- "Der Große Mafioso" (1982)
- "E´succeso in Kabul" (1982)
- "Pizza" (1984)

Albums

- Salmobray (1981)
- The Wirtschaftswunder (1982)
- Tscherwonez (1982)
- Pop Adenauer (1984)
- Die Gute Wahl (Das Beste) (1991)
