= LiLiPUT =

Swiss punk rock band

- Also known as: Kleenex
- Origin: Zürich, Switzerland
- Genres: Punk rock; post-punk
- Years active: 1978–1983
- Labels: Sunrise; Rough Trade; Off Course
- Past members: Lislot Ha; Klaudia Schiff; Regula Sing; Rudolph Dietrich; Candy "Gogi" Düggelbach; Marlene Marder; Chrigle Freund; Angie Barrack; Christoph Herzog; Beat Schlatter; Astrid Spirit

LiLiPUT, initially known as Kleenex, were a Swiss punk rock band formed in Zürich in 1978. The band experienced numerous line-up changes throughout their existence, with bassist Klaudia Schiff being the only constant member of the band over their entire history. Guitarist Marlene Marder joined the group shortly after their formation, and remained a member until their 1983 split. LiLiPUT's final line-up consisted of Schiff, Marder, and lead vocalist Astrid Spirit, and it was in this incarnation that the band recorded their only full-length studio albums, Liliput (1982) and Some Songs (1983).

According to AllMusic, LiLiPUT "made some of the best, most adventurous, most exhilarating, and most critically derided music" of the punk rock era.

== History ==
=== Kleenex (1978–1979) ===
Under the name Kleenex, the band formed in Zürich in 1978, with an initial line-up that included Lislot Ha (Lieselotte Hafner) on drums, Klaudia Schiff (Klaudia Schifferle) on bass and vocals, and Regula Sing on lead vocals. Marlene Marder (Marlene Marti), an acquaintance of the band, filled in on guitar during the encore portion of their first live performance, and thereafter remained in the band as their full-time guitarist.

Kleenex financed the recording of their eponymous debut EP, which was released in 1978 in Switzerland by Sunrise, a local label operated by friends of the band. The EP attracted the attention of English disc jockey John Peel, who championed the band on his radio shows, as well as Rough Trade Records, who subsequently signed the band. Kleenex released their debut single "Ain't You" in November 1978, and embarked on a tour of Europe throughout the following year. After the tour, Sing left the band and was replaced by Chrigle Freund. A second single, "You", was issued in 1979, and was the band's last release under the Kleenex name.

=== LiLiPUT (1979–1983) ===
The threat of legal action by Kimberly-Clark, who owned the Kleenex trademark, prompted Kleenex to change their name to LiLiPUT. Angie Barrack joined the band on saxophone soon after. As LiLiPUT, the band released two further singles, "Eisiger Wind" (1980) and "Split" (1981), both of which became hits on the UK Independent Singles Chart, the former after being reissued by Rough Trade in 1981. Ha and Barrack left the band around this time, followed by Freund. Astrid Spirit (Astrid Spirig) took over Freund's role as LiLiPUT's lead vocalist, while saxophonist Christoph Herzog and drummer Beat Schlatter also joined the band. After a successful German tour, Herzog and Schlatter departed LiLiPUT, though the latter continued to contribute drumming to studio recordings by the band.

Now consisting of Schiff, Marder, and Spirit, LiLiPUT released their self-titled debut album in 1982. They toured in support of the album and released a new single, "You Did It", in 1983. While Spirit was enthusiastic about a recording a second album, Schiff and Marder, exhausted from touring, expressed their desire to end the band. Spirit offered to take on managerial duties in LiLiPUT in order to ease her tired bandmates' workload. The trio ultimately recorded a second album, Some Songs, which was released in December 1983. By the time of its release, however, LiLiPUT had agreed to split up, as Spirit's pregnancy and desire to focus on motherhood meant that the band could not tour to promote the album.

=== Post-split activities ===
Marder wrote the book The Diary of the Guitarist Marlene Marder, Kleenex/LiLiPUT, published in 1985, in which she recounted her experiences as a member of the band. She helped operate a record store for several years, before playing in the band Danger Mice from 1989 to 1992. Marder later started her own artist management agency, helped oversee administration and promotion at a jazz club, and worked for the World Wide Fund for Nature. Schiff has devoted her time to painting.

In 1993, Swiss label Off Course Records released Kleenex/LiLiPUT, a double-disc CD compilation of the band's recordings from 1978 to 1983. Marder was closely involved in coordinating the compilation, which includes tracks sourced from tapes in her possession, while Schiff designed its cover art. The compilation was reissued in the United States by the Kill Rock Stars label in 2001, and subsequently by Mississippi Records as a four-LP box set in 2011.

In 2010, Kill Rock Stars released Live Recordings, TV-Clips & Roadmovie, a CD/DVD compilation of the band's live and televised performances and music videos, as well as other miscellaneous footage shot during the band's tours.

On 15 May 2016, Marlene Marder died at age 61.

Kill Rock Stars and Mississippi Records released First Songs, a compilation of the band's early material, in 2016.

== Musical style ==
LiLiPUT's exuberant sound combined spirited thrashy punk with unconventional vocals and lyrics, both in English and German. Their music featured husky or squealing vocals, ramshackle drums, scratchy and twanging guitar, thick funky bass, saxophone and occasionally flute, violin, or other instruments. The cut-up surreality of their lyrics and energetic sound put them in a league with bands like The Raincoats (frequent tour partners), Delta 5, The Slits, Essential Logic and Bush Tetras. The band's sound developed throughout their career, due in part to line-up changes; the earlier recordings are more noisy and energetic, while the later songs are more complex and haunting.

== Legacy ==
Kurt Cobain of Nirvana reserved one spot for "anything by Kleenex" on his list of his 50 favourite albums.

== Band member chronology ==
- 1978: Klaudia Schiff, Lislot Ha, Regula Sing, Rudolph Dietrich, Gogi
- 1978–1979: Klaudia Schiff, Marlene Marder, Lislot Ha, Regula Sing
- 1979–1980: Klaudia Schiff, Marlene Marder, Lislot Ha, Chrigle Freund, Angie Barrack
- 1981: Klaudia Schiff, Marlene Marder, Chrigle Freund
- 1981–1982: Klaudia Schiff, Marlene Marder, Astrid Spirit, Beat Schlatter, Christoph Herzog
- 1982–1983: Klaudia Schiff, Marlene Marder, Astrid Spirit

== Discography ==
=== Studio albums ===
- Liliput (1982, Rough Trade)
- Some Songs (1983, Rough Trade)

=== Compilation albums ===
- Kleenex/LiLiPUT (1993, Off Course)
- Live Recordings, TV-Clips & Roadmovie (2010, Kill Rock Stars)
- First Songs (2016, Kill Rock Stars/Mississippi)

=== Extended plays ===
- Kleenex (1978, Sunrise)

=== Singles ===
As Kleenex

- "Ain't You" / "Hedi's Head" (1978, Rough Trade)
- "You" / "Ü" (1979, Rough Trade)

As LiLiPUT

- "Eisiger Wind" / "When the Cat's Away Then the Mice Will Play" (1980, Off Course; reissued 1981, Rough Trade) – UK Indie No. 17
- "Split" / "Die Matrosen" (1980, Rough Trade) – UK Indie No. 31
- "You Did It" / "The Jatz" (1983, Rough Trade)
