= Roland Zoss =

Songwriter, musician, and novelist

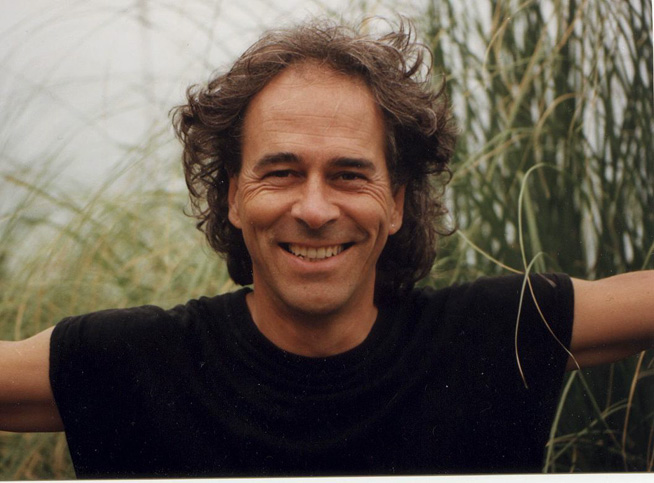

Roland Zoss (born 2 August 1951) is a songwriter, musician and novelist. He studied anthropology and literature in Bern and Avignon. He lives in the Aeolian Islands.

== Songwriter and novelist ==
Roland Zoss started his songwriter career in the late 1970s in Switzerland and Germany. After travelling the world, performing in hotspots as the Troubadour in L.A., he made success in Europe in 2004 with the album Härzland (Heartland) with Swiss German translations of the Leonard Cohen songs "First We Take Manhattan" ("Zersch näh me mer Manhattan"), "Halleluja" and the Elvis Presley song "In the Ghetto". He works with musicians and artists like Gottfried Helnwein, Michael Mish, Clare de Lune, Mauro Guiretti and Shirley Grimes. With Idan Raichel, Anna Murphy, Marta Gomez he is producing a children's world music lullabies album, Slumberland. The latest work is two song albums Baumlieder about the mythology and character of 28 trees. He was the first singer to compose an only tree songs album and put them into music. A children's book about the secret of the trees with Swiss mouse Jimmy Flitz, das Geheimnis der Baeume comes with it. Plus various novels, including the awarded: The Island Beyond the Moon.

== Swiss Mouse Jimmy Flitz ==
Between 1999 and 2020, he released three dozen song albums and books for children, some in English, some Spanish, some French, becoming one of the most known Swiss German singers for children. His brand became the mouse Jimmy Flitz known in the multi-awarded radio play series about Swiss mythologies Jimmy Flitz ("a journey through Switzerland") in 2007, starring his famous mouse on airlines. In 2010, the book Jimmy Flitz, die Schweizermaus (The Swiss Mouse) was released. Zoss represents Switzerland in his native Swiss dialect on the world music children's CD European Playground with the songs "Baerengeburi-Bubuland" and "Krokodil". Some songs are covered in English, French and Spanish.

== Swiss ABC Dino Xenegugeli ==
After three highly acclaimed recordings, Muku-Tiki-Mu, Schlummerland and JimmyFlitz- Swiss Christmas, in 2014 the app "ABC Dino Xenegugeli" became a worldwide success. The international educational app for children shows handcrafted art pictures, animated and combined with animal songs to each letter of the alphabet in five languages, plus e-books. The ABC Dino was nominated at the Frankfurt Book Fair 2015 as best children app, age 4-6. The German Youth Institute Munich does "highly recommend" the App.Youth Institute Munich/Germany

== Discography ==
- 1981 LP Roland Zoss, cover art work by Gottfried Helnwein
- 1983 LP Sternstunde
- 1985 LP Die Ewigkeit klopft an
- 1989 CD Fly my soul, ©RZ 004/RZ 005 & videoclip
- 1993 Radio feature and e-book Die Insel hinterm Mond (The Island beyond the moon)
- 1998 CD Saitenstrassen, songs and novel about the 1970s
- 1999 CD ABC Xenegugeli, 28 animal songs, incl. Krokodil 2012 on a Putumayo world music album
- 2001 CD 1 & 2 Muku-Tiki-Mu, world children's music, UNESCO patronage
- 2002 Güschi 1-6, a Swiss dialect radio play series
- 2003-06 Liedermärli, 8 CDs fairy tales, musicals in Swiss dialect
- 2004 Härzland, CD, rock-pop-poetry in Swiss with local stars Linard Bardill, Yvonne Moore, Carin Lavey, Djamila Tahar-Chaouch, Christoph Kohli SPAN,
- 2004 Schlumberland, lullabies with Shirley Grimes and Asita Hamidi with sound engineer and harp of Andreas Vollenweider, incl. Bärengeburi Bubuland on Putmayo world music European playground
- 2007 Jimmy Flitz, the Swiss mouse a radio play series with Swiss stars.
- 2009 Jimmy Flitz-Hits, CD
- 2011 SingDing, songs about the secret live of things.
- 2012 Xenegugeli GOLD-ABC, 26 new animal songs. Release of "Krokodil" on Putumayo Sing-Along Sampler.
- 2012 ÄngelsMusic meditation music about 9 angels.
- 2013 Jimmy Flitz ChinderWiehnacht, a Swiss Christmas musical with local stars and choirs: Steff la Cheffe, Tinu Heiniger, Christine Lauterburg (Jodel). Best children's album award 2015!
- 2015 Jimmy Flitz - a trip to Helvetia and A mouse goes into the parliament radio plays part 5 and 6 with Pedro Lenz, Eluveitie, Steff la Cheffe, Knackeboul, Shem Thomas, Christine Lauterburg and more. Award "Golden Crown" best children's album 2015!
- 2009 Jimmy Flitz-Hits 2, CD
- 2018/19 Baumlieder - Tree Songs 1 and 2, 28 songs about trees on two albums

== Awards ==
In 1993, Zoss received a literary award for the Aeolian tale and e-book The Island beyond the Moon and a dozen Golden Crown awards for his unique music for children. Several awards for the ABC Xenegugeli a multilingual ABC app, book and songs in English, Spanish, French, German and Swiss German. In 2010, the Swiss postal service honoured the work of Zoss with a Jimmy Flitz stamp. 2015 Golden Crown award for the best children album. ABC Dino was nominated in 2015 at the Frankfurt Book Fair as best children app, age 4-6
